= 2010 NASCAR Sprint Cup Series =

American motorsport season

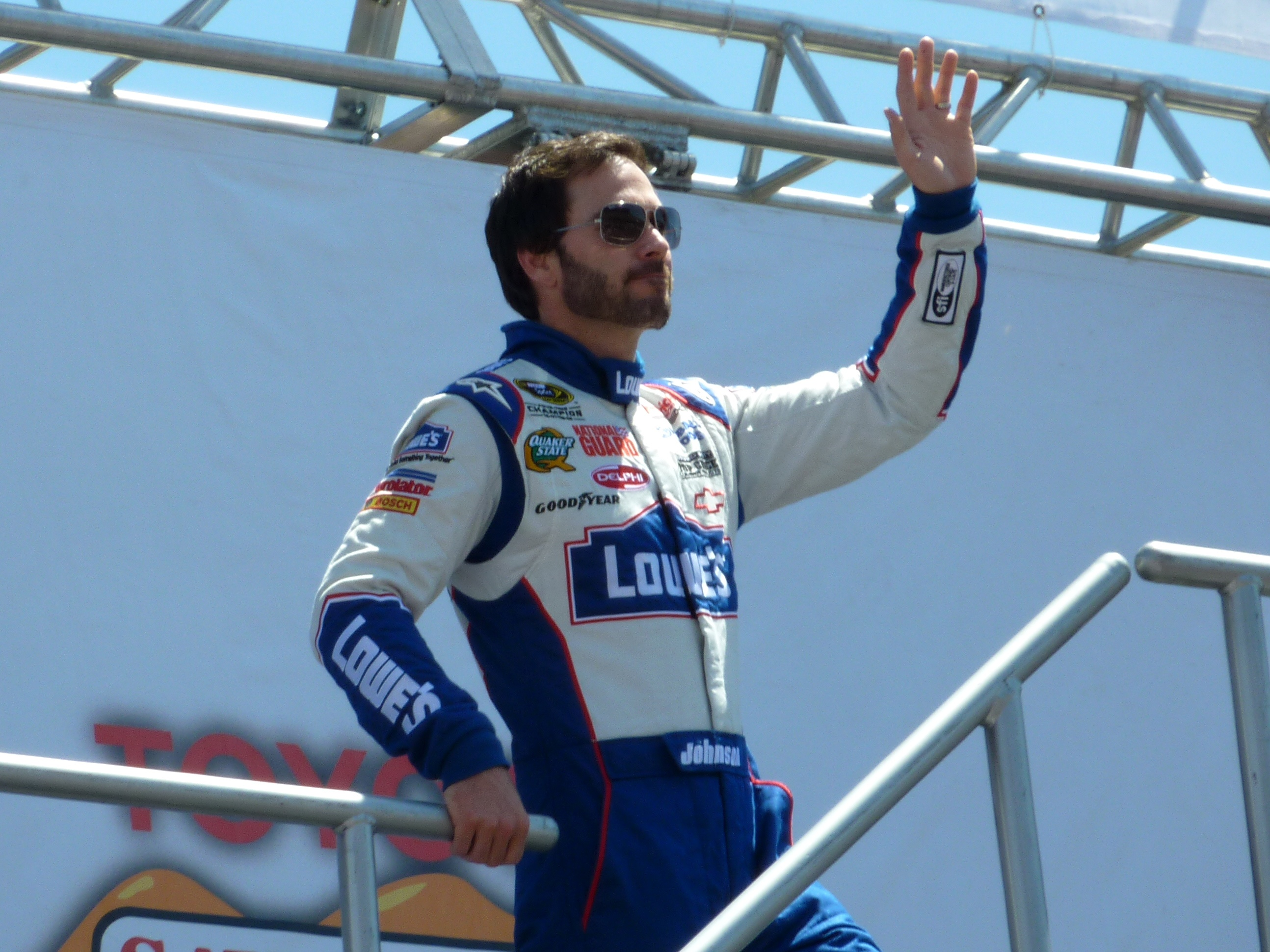
Jimmie Johnson, the 2010 Sprint Cup Series champion successfully defended his title. This was the fifth of his five consecutive titles of seven overall.

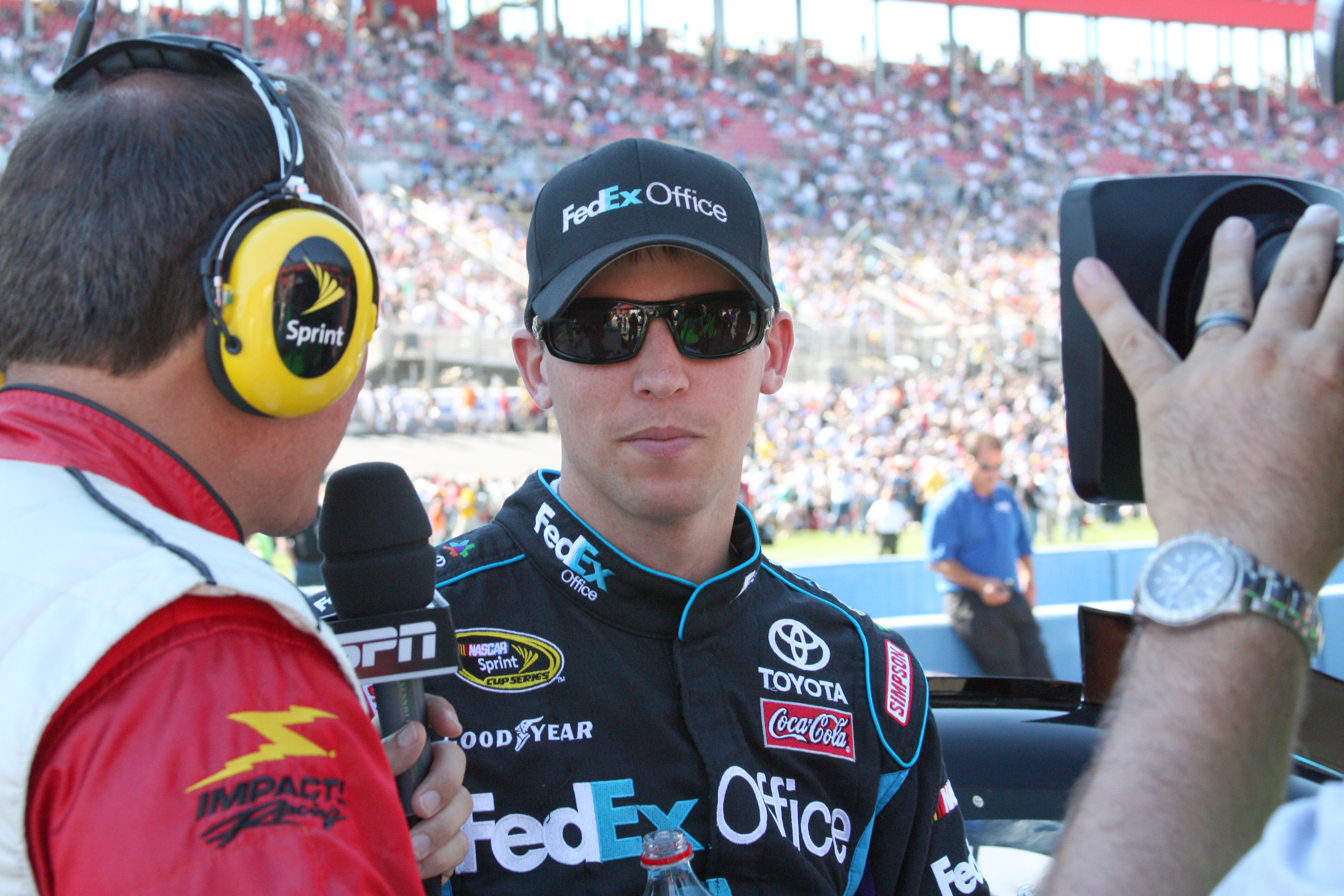
Denny Hamlin came in second behind Johnson by 39 points.

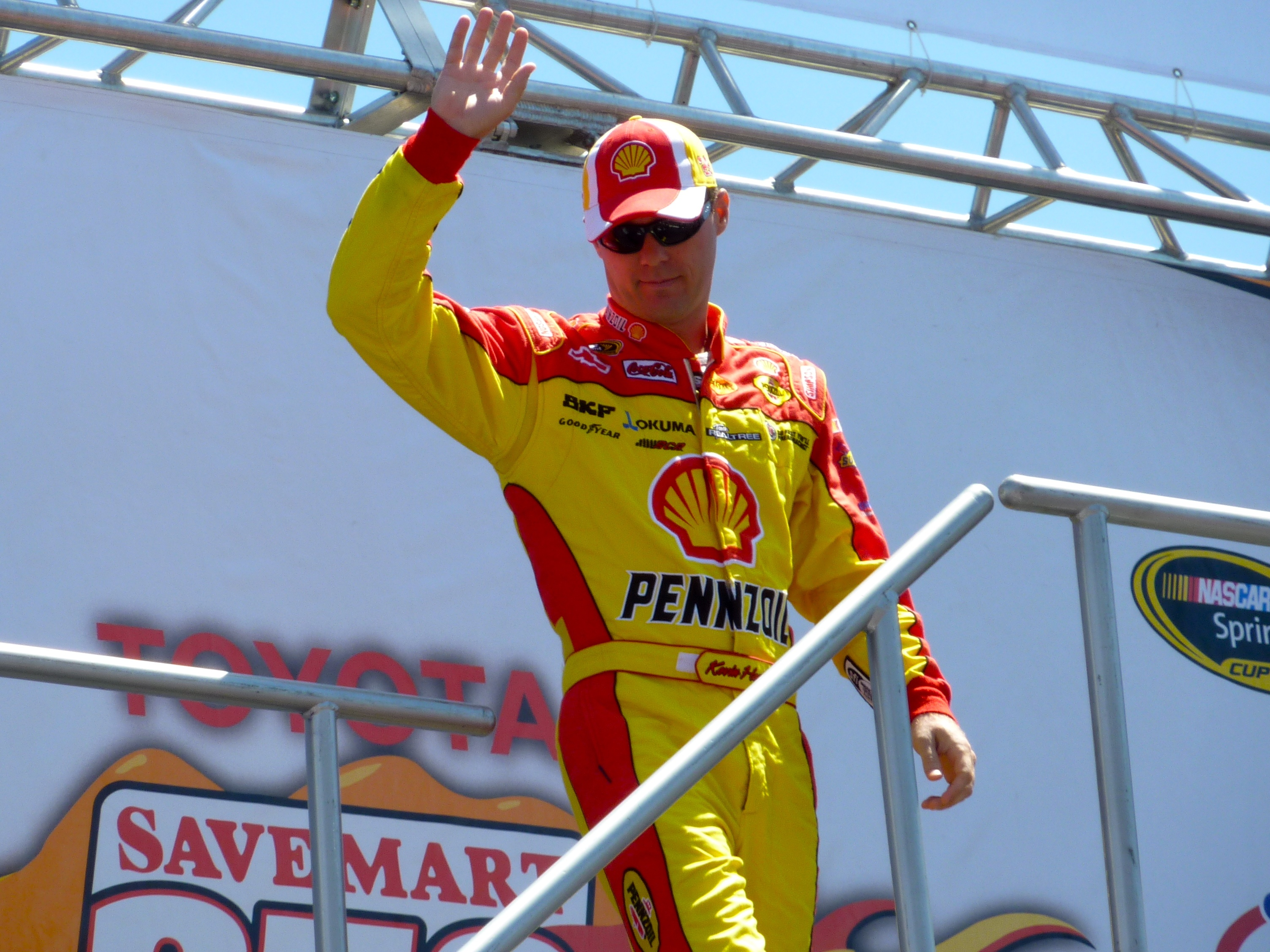
Kevin Harvick came in third behind Johnson by 41 points.

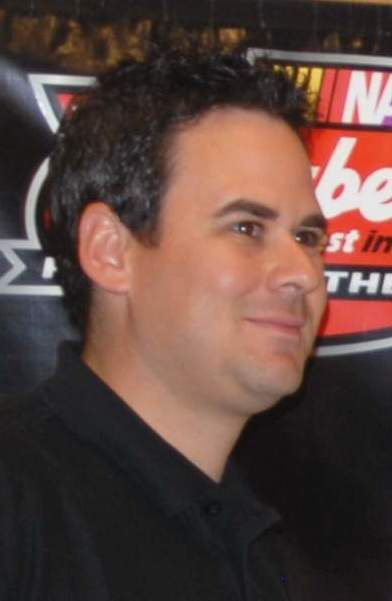
Kevin Conway, Rookie of the Year.

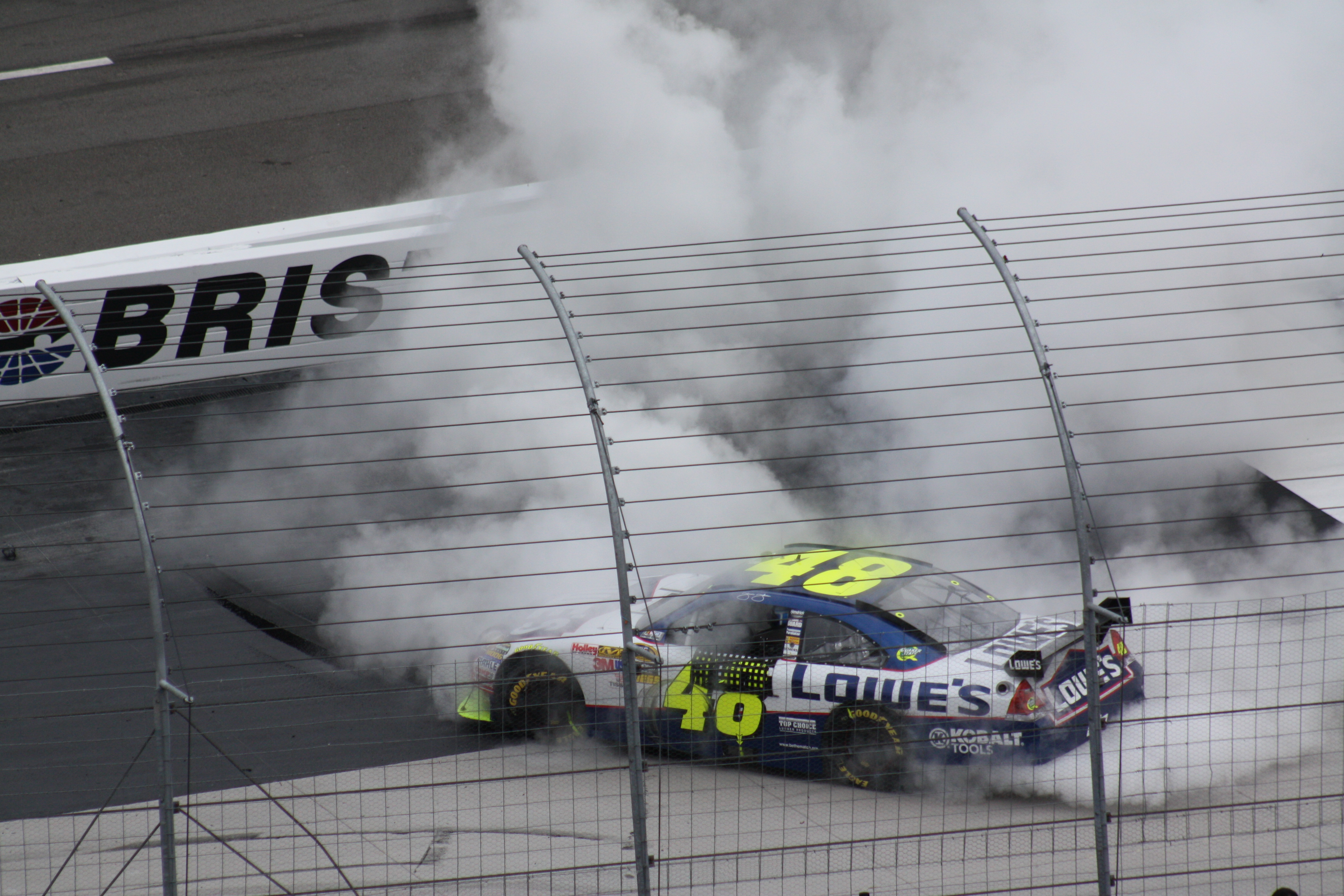
Chevrolet won the Manufacturer's championship with 18 wins & 261 points.

The 2010 NASCAR Sprint Cup Series was the 62nd season of professional stock car racing in the United States, the 39th modern-era cup series, and the first Cup season of the 2010s, the 21st century's second decade. Beginning at Daytona International Speedway, the season included 36 races and two exhibition races. The season concluded with the 2010 Ford 400 at Homestead-Miami Speedway. During the 2009 offseason, NASCAR announced a few calendar changes, including the standardized start time. Rick Hendrick won the Owners' Championship, while Jimmie Johnson won the Drivers' Championship with a second-place finish at the final race of the season. Chevrolet won the Manufacturers' Championship with 261 points. Johnson extended his record of consecutive championships with the 5th title in a row. He was also the last driver to win consecutive championships until Kyle Larson, also for Hendrick Motorsports, won two consecutive titles in 2025 and 2026.

== Teams and drivers ==
=== Complete schedule ===
There were 43 full-time teams in 2010.

Manufacturer	Team	No.	Driver	Crew chief
Chevrolet	Earnhardt Ganassi Racing	1	Jamie McMurray	Kevin Manion
Chevrolet	Earnhardt Ganassi Racing	42	Juan Pablo Montoya	Brian Pattie
Chevrolet	Furniture Row Racing	78	Regan Smith	Ryan Coniam 12; Pete Rondeau 24
Chevrolet	Hendrick Motorsports	5	Mark Martin	Alan Gustafson
Chevrolet	Hendrick Motorsports	24	Jeff Gordon	Steve Letarte
Chevrolet	Hendrick Motorsports	48	Jimmie Johnson	Chad Knaus
Chevrolet	Hendrick Motorsports	88	Dale Earnhardt Jr.	Lance McGrew
Chevrolet	Phoenix Racing	09	Aric Almirola 7	Marc Reno 25; Nick Harrison 11
Chevrolet	Phoenix Racing	09	Mike Bliss 7	Marc Reno 25; Nick Harrison 11
Chevrolet	Phoenix Racing	09	Terry Cook (R) 1	Marc Reno 25; Nick Harrison 11
Chevrolet	Phoenix Racing	09	Landon Cassill 6	Marc Reno 25; Nick Harrison 11
Chevrolet	Phoenix Racing	09	Jan Magnussen 1	Marc Reno 25; Nick Harrison 11
Chevrolet	Phoenix Racing	09	Bobby Labonte 14	Marc Reno 25; Nick Harrison 11
Chevrolet	Richard Childress Racing	29	Kevin Harvick	Gil Martin
Chevrolet	Richard Childress Racing	31	Jeff Burton	Todd Berrier
Chevrolet	Richard Childress Racing	33	Clint Bowyer	Shane Wilson
Chevrolet	Stewart–Haas Racing	14	Tony Stewart	Darian Grubb
Chevrolet	Stewart–Haas Racing	39	Ryan Newman	Tony Gibson
Chevrolet	Tommy Baldwin Racing	36	Mike Bliss 7	
Chevrolet	Tommy Baldwin Racing	36	Johnny Sauter 5	
Chevrolet	Tommy Baldwin Racing	36	Casey Mears 7	
Chevrolet	Tommy Baldwin Racing	36	Geoff Bodine 1	
Chevrolet	Tommy Baldwin Racing	36	Brian Simo 1	
Chevrolet	Tommy Baldwin Racing	36	Steve Park 1	
Chevrolet	Tommy Baldwin Racing	36	Ron Fellows 1	
Chevrolet	Tommy Baldwin Racing	36	Dave Blaney 7	
Chevrolet	Tommy Baldwin Racing	36	J. J. Yeley 6	
Chevrolet	TRG Motorsports	71	Bobby Labonte 19	Doug Randolph 14; Paul Clapprood 5 Dan Stillman 17
Chevrolet	TRG Motorsports	71	Andy Lally 7	Doug Randolph 14; Paul Clapprood 5 Dan Stillman 17
Chevrolet	TRG Motorsports	71	Mike Bliss 1	Doug Randolph 14; Paul Clapprood 5 Dan Stillman 17
Chevrolet	TRG Motorsports	71	Landon Cassill 5	Doug Randolph 14; Paul Clapprood 5 Dan Stillman 17
Chevrolet	TRG Motorsports	71	Tony Raines 1	Doug Randolph 14; Paul Clapprood 5 Dan Stillman 17
Chevrolet	TRG Motorsports	71	Hermie Sadler 1	Doug Randolph 14; Paul Clapprood 5 Dan Stillman 17
Chevrolet	TRG Motorsports	71	Chad McCumbee 1	Doug Randolph 14; Paul Clapprood 5 Dan Stillman 17
Chevrolet	TRG Motorsports	71	Brendan Gaughan 1	Doug Randolph 14; Paul Clapprood 5 Dan Stillman 17
Chevrolet	Whitney Motorsports	46	Michael McDowell 12	Jeremy Lafaver
Dodge	Whitney Motorsports	46	Terry Cook (R) 10	Jeremy Lafaver
Dodge	Whitney Motorsports	46	J. J. Yeley 14	Jeremy Lafaver
Dodge	Penske Championship Racing	2	Kurt Busch	Steve Addington
Dodge	Penske Championship Racing	12	Brad Keselowski	Jay Guy
Dodge	Penske Championship Racing	77	Sam Hornish Jr.	Travis Geisler
Ford	Front Row Motorsports with Yates Racing	34	John Andretti 1	
Ford	Front Row Motorsports with Yates Racing	34	Travis Kvapil 19	
Ford	Front Row Motorsports with Yates Racing	34	Kevin Conway (R) 10	
Ford	Front Row Motorsports with Yates Racing	34	Tony Raines 5	
Ford	Front Row Motorsports with Yates Racing	34	Robert Richardson Jr. 1	
Ford	Front Row Motorsports with Yates Racing	37	Travis Kvapil 4	
Ford	Front Row Motorsports with Yates Racing	37	Kevin Conway (R) 6	
Ford	Front Row Motorsports with Yates Racing	37	David Gilliland 19	
Ford	Front Row Motorsports with Yates Racing	37	Robert Richardson Jr. 2	
Ford	Front Row Motorsports with Yates Racing	37	Tony Raines 2	
Ford	Front Row Motorsports with Yates Racing	37	Dave Blaney 3	
Ford	Front Row Motorsports with Yates Racing	38	Robert Richardson Jr. 1	
Ford	Front Row Motorsports with Yates Racing	38	David Gilliland 14	
Ford	Front Row Motorsports with Yates Racing	38	Kevin Conway (R) 5	
Ford	Front Row Motorsports with Yates Racing	38	Travis Kvapil 13	
Ford	Front Row Motorsports with Yates Racing	38	Dave Blaney 3	
Ford	Latitude 43 Motorsports	26	Boris Said 5	Frank Stoddard
Ford	Latitude 43 Motorsports	26	David Stremme 16	Frank Stoddard
Ford	Latitude 43 Motorsports	26	Patrick Carpentier 8	Frank Stoddard
Ford	Latitude 43 Motorsports	26	Jeff Green 4	Frank Stoddard
Ford	Latitude 43 Motorsports	26	Ken Schrader 1	Frank Stoddard
Ford	Latitude 43 Motorsports	26	Bill Elliott 1	Frank Stoddard
Ford	Latitude 43 Motorsports	26	J. J. Yeley 1	Frank Stoddard
Ford	Richard Petty Motorsports	9	Kasey Kahne 31	Kenny Francis
Ford	Richard Petty Motorsports	9	Aric Almirola 5	Kenny Francis
Ford	Richard Petty Motorsports	19	Elliott Sadler	Wally Rogers 18; Todd Parrott 18
Ford	Richard Petty Motorsports	43	A. J. Allmendinger	Mike Shiplett
Ford	Richard Petty Motorsports	98	Paul Menard	Slugger Labbe
Ford	Roush Fenway Racing	6	David Ragan	Donnie Wingo 29; Drew Blickensderfer 7
Ford	Roush Fenway Racing	16	Greg Biffle	Greg Erwin
Ford	Roush Fenway Racing	17	Matt Kenseth	Todd Parrott 16; Jimmy Fennig 20
Ford	Roush Fenway Racing	99	Carl Edwards	Bob Osborne
Toyota	Germain Racing	13	Max Papis 23	Bootie Barker
Toyota	Germain Racing	13	Casey Mears 13	Bootie Barker
Toyota	Joe Gibbs Racing	11	Denny Hamlin	Mike Ford
Toyota	Joe Gibbs Racing	18	Kyle Busch	Dave Rogers
Toyota	Joe Gibbs Racing	20	Joey Logano	Greg Zipadelli
Toyota	JTG Daugherty Racing; Michael Waltrip Racing	47	Marcos Ambrose	Frank Kerr
Toyota	Michael Waltrip Racing	00	David Reutimann	Rodney Childers
Toyota	Michael Waltrip Racing	56	Martin Truex Jr.	Pat Tryson
Toyota	Prism Motorsports	66	Dave Blaney 20	
Toyota	Prism Motorsports	66	Michael McDowell 2	
Toyota	Prism Motorsports	66	Scott Riggs 4	
Toyota	Prism Motorsports	66	Johnny Sauter 3	
Toyota	Prism Motorsports	66	Ted Musgrave 1	
Toyota	Prism Motorsports	66	Jason Leffler 4	
Toyota	Prism Motorsports	66	Mike Bliss 2	
Toyota	NEMCO Motorsports	87	Joe Nemechek	Phillipe Lopez
Toyota	Red Bull Racing Team	82	Scott Speed	Jimmy Elledge 13; Ryan Pemberton 23
Toyota	Red Bull Racing Team	83	Brian Vickers 11	Ryan Pemberton 13; Jimmy Elledge 23
Toyota	Red Bull Racing Team	83	Casey Mears 4	Ryan Pemberton 13; Jimmy Elledge 23
Toyota	Red Bull Racing Team	83	Mattias Ekström 2	Ryan Pemberton 13; Jimmy Elledge 23
Toyota	Red Bull Racing Team	83	Reed Sorenson 13	Ryan Pemberton 13; Jimmy Elledge 23
Toyota	Red Bull Racing Team	83	Boris Said 1	Ryan Pemberton 13; Jimmy Elledge 23
Toyota	Red Bull Racing Team	83	Kasey Kahne 5	Ryan Pemberton 13; Jimmy Elledge 23
Toyota	Robby Gordon Motorsports	7	Robby Gordon 25	Ian Watt 6 Samuel Stanley 18; Gene Nead 8 Steve Lane 2
Toyota	Robby Gordon Motorsports	7	Ted Musgrave 1	Ian Watt 6 Samuel Stanley 18; Gene Nead 8 Steve Lane 2
Toyota	Robby Gordon Motorsports	7	Bobby Labonte 1	Ian Watt 6 Samuel Stanley 18; Gene Nead 8 Steve Lane 2
Toyota	Robby Gordon Motorsports	7	P. J. Jones 2	Ian Watt 6 Samuel Stanley 18; Gene Nead 8 Steve Lane 2
Toyota	Robby Gordon Motorsports	7	Kevin Conway (R) 7	Ian Watt 6 Samuel Stanley 18; Gene Nead 8 Steve Lane 2

=== Limited schedule ===
Manufacturer	Team	No.	Driver	Rounds
Chevrolet	Keyed-Up Motorsports	90	Casey Mears	6
Chevrolet	Keyed-Up Motorsports	90	Scott Riggs	1
Chevrolet	Morgan-McClure Motorsports	4	Kevin Lepage	1
Chevrolet	Norm Benning Racing	57	Norm Benning	1
Chevrolet	Stavola Labonte Racing	10	Terry Labonte	1
Chevrolet	Stavola Labonte Racing	10	Bobby Labonte	2
Chevrolet	Tommy Baldwin Racing	35	Johnny Sauter	3
Chevrolet	Tommy Baldwin Racing	35	Aric Almirola	1
Chevrolet	Tri-Star Motorsports	35	Tony Ave	1
Dodge	Ash Racing	02	Brandon Ash	2
Dodge	K-Automotive Motorsports	92	Mike Wallace	1
Dodge	K-Automotive Motorsports	92	Brian Keselowski	3
Dodge	Stratus Racing Group	75	Derrike Cope	1
Dodge	Whitney Motorsports	81	J. J. Yeley	2
Dodge	Whitney Motorsports	81	Scott Riggs	1
Dodge	Whitney Motorsports	81	Terry Labonte	1
Ford	Wood Brothers Racing	21	Bill Elliott	12
Ford	Wood Brothers Racing	21	Trevor Bayne	1
Toyota	BAM Racing	49	David Gilliland	1
Toyota	Braun Racing	32	Reed Sorenson	5
Toyota	Braun Racing	32	Mike Bliss	3
Toyota	Braun Racing	32	Jacques Villeneuve	1
Toyota	Braun Racing	32	Jason Leffler	2
Toyota	Gunselman Motorsports	64	Tony Raines	1
Toyota	Gunselman Motorsports	64	Todd Bodine	12
Toyota	Gunselman Motorsports	64	Chad McCumbee	1
Toyota	Gunselman Motorsports	64	Landon Cassill	7
Toyota	Gunselman Motorsports	64	Josh Wise	1
Toyota	Gunselman Motorsports	64	Jeff Green	2
Toyota	Kirk Shelmerdine Racing	27	Todd Bodine	1
Toyota	Michael Waltrip Racing	51	Michael Waltrip	1
Toyota	Michael Waltrip Racing	55	Michael Waltrip	1
Toyota	Prism Motorsports	55	Michael Waltrip	4
Toyota	Prism Motorsports	55	Michael McDowell	18
Toyota	Prism Motorsports	55	Dave Blaney	2
Toyota	Prism Motorsports	55	Mike Bliss	7
Toyota	Prism Motorsports	55	Terry Labonte	1
Toyota	Prism Motorsports	55	Terry Cook (R)	1
Toyota	NEMCO Motorsports	97	Jeff Fuller	2
Toyota	R3 Motorsports	23	Johnny Sauter	1
Toyota	R3 Motorsports	23	Josh Wise	1
Toyota	Robby Gordon Motorsports	07	P. J. Jones	2
Toyota	Robby Gordon Motorsports	07	Robby Gordon	3
Toyota	Robby Gordon Motorsports	07	Kevin Conway (R)	1

=== Team changes ===
- Roush Fenway Racing removed one of their cars because of the five to four car maximum rule.
- Richard Petty Motorsports and Yates Racing merged to form one team. Richard Petty Motorsports switched from Dodges after the merger to Yates Racing with Fords.
- Richard Childress Racing removed one of their cars to form a three car team.

=== Driver changes ===
- Martin Truex Jr. left Earnhardt Ganassi Racing's No. 1 car to drive for Michael Waltrip Racing's No. 56 in 2010, replacing Michael Waltrip, who ran a partial schedule with the team's No. 51 and Prism Motorsports No. 55. Truex Jr. signed a multi-year agreement, with options for further years.
- Jamie McMurray moved from Roush Fenway Racing to replace Truex Jr. in the No. 1 for Earnhardt Ganassi Racing.

== Rule changes ==
It was announced in January as part of the annual preseason media tour in Charlotte that, after years of restrictions, drivers would be let loose as it were, popularly referred to as "Boys, Have At It". Rules were altered to allow for "bump drafting", especially at Daytona and Talladega. On February 10, the green-white-checker finish rule was altered in all three major series (including the Nationwide and Camping World Truck Series) to allow for up to three attempts for said finish. Starting with the Shelby American, NASCAR extended its post-race inspections to include the first car out of the race that was not involved in a wreck; in other words, the first start and park.

At Martinsville, spoilers returned to the Car of Tomorrow after the finish of the 2009 Aaron's 499 that saw Carl Edwards' car becoming airborne and flying into the catch fencing after colliding with eventual winner Brad Keselowski on the last turn.

All teams were capped at four full-time teams starting in 2010, the only casualty of this was Roush Fenway Racing's No. 26 Ford, Which was closed following 2009. However, teams were able to have a part time fifth car for lower division rookie drivers. In 2016, NASCAR banned any form of a fifth car.

== Hall of Fame opens ==
On May 11, the NASCAR Hall of Fame was officially opened in Charlotte, North Carolina. The three-story building houses historic artifacts, interactive displays and the shrine for inductees. The Charter Class of 2010 — made up of seven-time champions Richard Petty and Dale Earnhardt, NASCAR founder Bill France Sr., his son and owner/driver Junior Johnson — were inducted on May 23.

== Schedule ==
The total scheduled distance of the season was 14,461.9 miles (23,274.2 km), but race distances could be shorter or longer depending on weather and green-white-checker finishes. The final schedule was released on September 15, 2009.

The logo for the 2010 Chase for the Sprint Cup

No.	Race title	Track	Date
	Budweiser Shootout	Daytona International Speedway, Daytona Beach	February 6
	Gatorade Duels	Daytona International Speedway, Daytona Beach	February 11
1	Daytona 500	Daytona International Speedway, Daytona Beach	February 14
2	Auto Club 500	Auto Club Speedway, Fontana	February 21
3	Shelby American	Las Vegas Motor Speedway, Las Vegas	February 28
4	Kobalt Tools 500 (Atlanta)	Atlanta Motor Speedway, Hampton	March 7
5	Food City 500	Bristol Motor Speedway, Bristol	March 21
6	Goody's Fast Pain Relief 500	Martinsville Speedway, Martinsville	March 29
7	Subway Fresh Fit 600	Phoenix International Raceway, Avondale	April 10
8	Samsung Mobile 500	Texas Motor Speedway, Fort Worth	April 19
9	Aaron's 499	Talladega Superspeedway, Talladega	April 25
10	Crown Royal presents the Heath Calhoun 400	Richmond International Raceway, Richmond	May 1
11	Showtime Southern 500	Darlington Raceway, Darlington	May 8
12	Autism Speaks 400	Dover International Speedway, Dover	May 16
	Sprint Showdown	Charlotte Motor Speedway, Concord	May 22
	Sprint All-Star Race	Charlotte Motor Speedway, Concord	May 22
13	Coca-Cola 600	Charlotte Motor Speedway, Concord	May 30
14	Gillette Fusion ProGlide 500	Pocono Raceway, Long Pond	June 6
15	Heluva Good! Sour Cream Dips 400	Michigan International Speedway, Brooklyn	June 13
16	Toyota/Save Mart 350	Infineon Raceway, Sonoma	June 20
17	Lenox Industrial Tools 301	New Hampshire Motor Speedway, Loudon	June 27
18	Coke Zero 400	Daytona International Speedway, Daytona Beach	July 3
19	LifeLock.com 400	Chicagoland Speedway, Joliet	July 10
20	Brickyard 400	Indianapolis Motor Speedway, Speedway	July 25
21	Sunoco Red Cross Pennsylvania 500	Pocono Raceway, Long Pond	August 1
22	Heluva Good! Sour Cream Dips at The Glen	Watkins Glen International, Watkins Glen	August 8
23	Carfax 400	Michigan International Speedway, Brooklyn	August 15
24	Irwin Tools Night Race	Bristol Motor Speedway, Bristol	August 21
25	Emory Healthcare 500	Atlanta Motor Speedway, Hampton	September 5
26	Air Guard 400	Richmond International Raceway, Richmond	September 11
Chase for the Sprint Cup
27	Sylvania 300	New Hampshire Motor Speedway, Loudon	September 19
28	AAA 400	Dover International Speedway, Dover	September 26
29	Price Chopper 400	Kansas Speedway, Kansas City	October 3
30	Pepsi Max 400	Auto Club Speedway, Fontana	October 10
31	Bank of America 500	Charlotte Motor Speedway, Concord	October 16
32	TUMS Fast Relief 500	Martinsville Speedway, Martinsville	October 24
33	AMP Energy Juice 500	Talladega Superspeedway, Talladega	October 31
34	AAA Texas 500	Texas Motor Speedway, Fort Worth	November 7
35	Kobalt Tools 500	Phoenix International Raceway, Avondale	November 14
36	Ford 400	Homestead-Miami Speedway, Homestead	November 21
Note:All times are when the race begins, not when the pre-race shows begin. Delays of the races are not shown on this list.

=== Calendar changes ===
- For the 2010 season, all races adopted standardized start times; east coast day races began at 1:00 pm. ET, west coast day races began at 12:00 pm. PT (3:00 pm. ET), and most night races began at 7:30 pm. ET. These changes were intended to alleviate fan confusion over the inconsistent scheduling practices of previous seasons, allow teams a "shorter" race day due to the earlier start times, and to provide more "flexibility" in the event of rain delays. The Coca-Cola 600 maintained its traditional early-evening start time, while the Coke Zero 400 was delayed due to weather.
- The Autism Speaks 400 was moved before the NASCAR Sprint All-Star Race and the Coca-Cola 600.
- The Subway Fresh Fit 600 and Samsung Mobile 500 switched their dates.

== Broadcasting ==
=== United States ===
Fox Sports, their corporate sibling Speed, TNT, and ESPN/ABC are in the fourth year of an eight-year television contract scheduled to expire after the 2014 season. Showtime is going to show a highlights show for the first time.

Fox

Fox Sports broadcast the first 13 races, including the Budweiser Shootout, the 52nd Daytona 500, and the Coca-Cola 600. With Dover moving to mid-May, Fox ended their coverage with the 51st Coca-Cola 600. The Sprint All-Star Race XXVI along with the Gatorade Duels, practice sessions, and all qualifying and practice sessions (except for Daytona qualifying, which aired on Fox) were all broadcast on Speed. The network's Gopher Cam mascot, Digger, returned for on-screen displays.

TNT

Time Warner's Turner Sports division (through TNT) broadcast the next six races, including the Coke Zero 400 at Daytona in its limited commercial interruption wide open coverage format. That race will also be telecast in 3-D on both NASCAR.com and DirecTV. TNT's coverage will begin with the June Pocono race and end with Chicagoland. Qualifying and practice sessions will remain on Speed. Adam Alexander will be the new lead announcer, with Lindsay Czarniak hosting pre-and-post-race shows, replacing Bill Weber and Marc Fein respectively.

ESPN/ABC

ESPN carried the remaining races, beginning with the Brickyard 400. ABC, which formerly carried the last 11 races of the season, will carry the Saturday night races in Bristol, Richmond, and Charlotte. Although previously races could not be moved from ABC to ESPN, early start times and ABC's plans to expand its Sunday morning political shows meant that NASCAR had to allow most Chase races to move to ESPN. This was met from criticism from most of ABC's southern-based affiliates, who had originally counted on NASCAR on those Sundays for ratings gains against the NFL.

Most qualifying sessions will air on ESPN2, practice sessions and some qualifying will be shared by SPEED and ESPN2. Qualifying for the Pep Boys Auto 500 and AMP Energy 500 air on Speed because they are Saturday afternoon sessions during the college football season. Additionally, Jerry Punch was replaced in the play-by-play position by Marty Reid; Punch will return to the pits where he worked at ESPN until 2000.

Showtime

CBS-owned pay cable premium service Showtime carried a weekly one-hour highlight show titled Inside NASCAR every Wednesday at 10 pm ET/PT, with the series premiere on February 10. Chris Myers, who also hosts FOX's NASCAR coverage, will serve as host, joined by SPEED's Randy Pemberton & Michael Waltrip, and ESPN's Brad Daugherty, with the shows taping at the NASCAR Hall of Fame Studio 43. 38 episodes are planned, covering the season.

Radio

On radio, Sirius XM Radio carried all races in the series. Terrestrial radio rights are being handled as follows:

- Motor Racing Network carried races at tracks owned by their corporate sibling, International Speedway Corporation as well as the races at Dover and Pocono and the All-Star Race at Charlotte;
- Speedway Motorsports, Inc.-owned Performance Racing Network carried events from those SMI tracks, and jointly produced the Allstate 400 at the Brickyard with the Indianapolis Motor Speedway Radio Network.

=== Other North American channels ===
In Canada, TSN and TSN 2 will have full coverage for the 2010 season.

=== International ===
In Australia, Fox Sports showed all Sprint Cup races live across their networks. Network Ten also showed races on its digital sports multichannel, ONE.

In Portugal, all races from the 2010 season were telecast on SportTv 3, while in Sweden, Viasat Motor televised the races.

In nearby Finland, Nelonen Sport Pro telecasted the season's events.

In Spain, Teledeporte telecasted six races of the season.

In Latin America, Speed Channel broadcast all Sprint Cup races and Nationwide races live.

In France, ABMoteurs broadcast all Sprint Cup races live.

In the United Kingdom, it was originally thought that Sky Sports had not secured the rights to the series for 2010. However, this changed in early February as Sky announced that they will show live coverage of the Daytona 500, with an hour-long highlights package for the rest of the races, on the Monday following each race. The remainder of the season, starting with the Shelby American, were shown on Open Access 3.

== Top 35 owner's points ==
Beginning at Martinsville, NASCAR used the 2010 owner's points standings. Teams in the top 35 positions were guaranteed entry into the race; those below had to qualify on time.

- Changes after Phoenix race: No. 7 team moves into the Top 35, replacing the No. 34 team.
- Texas: The No. 34 entry moves up to 34th, No. 37 falls to 35th, No. 7 is 36th, one point out of safety (Fifteen points separate 33rd (No. 38 team) and 36th).
- Talladega: No. 34 team moves up to 33rd, No. 7 is 34th, No. 38 team is 35th, No. 37 team is two points out of safety.
- Richmond: Front Row Motorsports cars are 34th (No. 34), 35th (No. 37), and 36th (No. 38).
- Darlington: No change in and out initially. No. 7 entry penalized 25 points for violating NASCAR rules and slips to 35th.
- Dover: No. 7 and No. 38 tied, No. 37 is two points out of safety
- Charlotte: Front Row Motorsports cars (No. 34, No. 37, No. 38 in order) are in Top 35, No. 7 is 15 points out
- Pocono: After a 150-point penalty, the No. 38 team falls out of the Top 35, while the No. 7 moves in.

Pos	Number	Owner	Points	Difference from 35th
32	7	Robby Gordon	2587	+36
33	37	Doug Yates	2579	+30
34	34	Bob Jenkins	2564	+15
35	71	Kevin Buckler	2549	
36	38	Doug Yates	2454	−95

== Results and standings ==
=== Races ===
No.	Race	Pole position	Most laps led	Winning driver	Winning manufacturer	Report
	Budweiser Shootout	Carl Edwards	Greg Biffle	Kevin Harvick	Chevrolet	Report
	Gatorade Duel No. 1	Mark Martin	Jimmie Johnson	Jimmie Johnson	Chevrolet	Report
	Gatorade Duel No. 2	Dale Earnhardt Jr.	Tony Stewart	Kasey Kahne	Ford	Report
1	Daytona 500	Mark Martin	Kevin Harvick	Jamie McMurray	Chevrolet	Report
2	Auto Club 500	Jamie McMurray	Jimmie Johnson	Jimmie Johnson	Chevrolet	Report
3	Shelby American	Kurt Busch	Jeff Gordon	Jimmie Johnson	Chevrolet	Report
4	Kobalt Tools 500 (Atlanta)	Dale Earnhardt Jr.	Kasey Kahne	Kurt Busch	Dodge	Report
5	Food City 500	Joey Logano	Jimmie Johnson	Jimmie Johnson	Chevrolet	Report
6	Goody's Fast Pain Relief 500	Kevin Harvick	Denny Hamlin	Denny Hamlin	Toyota	Report
7	Subway Fresh Fit 600	A. J. Allmendinger	Jimmie Johnson; Kyle Busch	Ryan Newman	Chevrolet	Report
8	Samsung Mobile 500	Tony Stewart	Jeff Gordon	Denny Hamlin	Toyota	Report
9	Aaron's 499	Jimmie Johnson	Jeff Burton	Kevin Harvick	Chevrolet	Report
10	Crown Royal 400	Kyle Busch	Kyle Busch	Kyle Busch	Toyota	Report
11	Showtime Southern 500	Jamie McMurray	Jeff Gordon	Denny Hamlin	Toyota	Report
12	Autism Speaks 400	Martin Truex Jr.	Jimmie Johnson	Kyle Busch	Toyota	Report
	NASCAR Sprint All-Star Race	Kurt Busch	Jimmie Johnson	Kurt Busch	Dodge	Report
13	Coca-Cola 600	Ryan Newman	Kurt Busch	Kurt Busch	Dodge	Report
14	Gillette Fusion ProGlide 500	Kyle Busch	Denny Hamlin	Denny Hamlin	Toyota	Report
15	Heluva Good! Sour Cream Dips 400	Kurt Busch	Denny Hamlin	Denny Hamlin	Toyota	Report
16	Toyota/Save Mart 350	Kasey Kahne	Jimmie Johnson	Jimmie Johnson	Chevrolet	Report
17	Lenox Industrial Tools 301	Juan Pablo Montoya	Kasey Kahne	Jimmie Johnson	Chevrolet	Report
18	Coke Zero 400	Kevin Harvick	Kevin Harvick	Kevin Harvick	Chevrolet	Report
19	LifeLock.com 400	Jamie McMurray	Jimmie Johnson	David Reutimann	Toyota	Report
20	Brickyard 400	Juan Pablo Montoya	Juan Pablo Montoya	Jamie McMurray	Chevrolet	Report
21	Pennsylvania 500	Tony Stewart	Jimmie Johnson	Greg Biffle	Ford	Report
22	Heluva Good! Sour Cream Dips at The Glen	Carl Edwards	Juan Pablo Montoya	Juan Pablo Montoya	Chevrolet	Report
23	Carfax 400	Kasey Kahne	Greg Biffle	Kevin Harvick	Chevrolet	Report
24	Irwin Tools Night Race	Jimmie Johnson	Kyle Busch	Kyle Busch	Toyota	Report
25	Emory Healthcare 500	Denny Hamlin	Tony Stewart	Tony Stewart	Chevrolet	Report
26	Air Guard 400	Carl Edwards	Denny Hamlin	Denny Hamlin	Toyota	Report
Chase for the Sprint Cup
27	Sylvania 300	Brad Keselowski	Clint Bowyer	Clint Bowyer	Chevrolet	Report
28	AAA 400	Jimmie Johnson	Jimmie Johnson	Jimmie Johnson	Chevrolet	Report
29	Price Chopper 400	Kasey Kahne	Tony Stewart	Greg Biffle	Ford	Report
30	Pepsi Max 400	Jamie McMurray	Mark Martin	Tony Stewart	Chevrolet	Report
31	Bank of America 500	Jeff Gordon	Kyle Busch	Jamie McMurray	Chevrolet	Report
32	TUMS Fast Relief 500	Denny Hamlin	Jeff Burton	Denny Hamlin	Toyota	Report
33	AMP Energy Juice 500	Juan Pablo Montoya	Dale Earnhardt Jr.	Clint Bowyer	Chevrolet	Report
34	AAA Texas 500	Elliott Sadler	Greg Biffle	Denny Hamlin	Toyota	Report
35	Kobalt Tools 500	Carl Edwards	Denny Hamlin	Carl Edwards	Ford	Report
36	Ford 400	Kasey Kahne	Carl Edwards	Carl Edwards	Ford	Report

=== Drivers ===
(key) Bold – Pole position awarded by time. Italics – Pole position set by final practice results. * – Most laps led. Bold italics – Drivers currently in "wild card" qualifying positions for the Chase. (R) – Competing for Rookie of the Year

Pos.	Driver	DAY	CAL	LVS	ATL	BRI	MAR	PHO	TEX	TAL	RCH	DAR	DOV	CLT	POC	MCH	SON	NHA	DAY	CHI	IND	POC	GLN	MCH	BRI	ATL	RCH	NHA	DOV	KAN	CAL	CLT	MAR	TAL	TEX	PHO	HOM	Points
1	Jimmie Johnson	35	1*	1	12	1	9	3*	2	31	10	36	16*	37	5	6	1*	1	31	25*	22	10*	28	12	**35**	3	3	25	**1***	2	3	3	5	7	9	5	2	6622
2	Denny Hamlin	17	29	19	21	19	1*	30	1	4	11	1	4	18	1*	1*	34	14	24	8	15	5	37	2	34	**43**	1*	2	9	12	8	4	**1**	9	1	12*	14	6583
3	Kevin Harvick	7*	2	2	9	11	35	13	7	1	3	6	7	11	4	19	3	5	**1***	34	2	4	11	1	14	33	9	5	15	3	7	8	3	2	6	6	3	6581
4	Carl Edwards	9	13	12	39	6	8	7	33	11	5	15	8	16	12	12	29	25	6	2	7	3	**5**	3	12	2	**10**	11	5	6	34	12	8	17	19	**1**	1*	6393
5	Matt Kenseth	8	7	5	2	5	18	6	20	28	13	13	3	10	17	14	30	17	15	13	12	18	13	5	10	11	14	23	18	7	30	6	15	16	2	7	9	6294
6	Greg Biffle	3	10	10	8	4	10	22	10	17	22	22	6	32	28	9	7	16	20	35	3	1	24	4*	8	36	32	17	19	1	41	5	33	19	5*	4	10	6247
7	Tony Stewart	22	9	7	13	2	26	23	**32**	16	23	23	9	15	3	5	9	2	25	9	5	**2**	7	6	27	1*	16	24	21	4*	1	21	24	31	11	17	8	6221
8	Kyle Busch	14	14	15	25	9	22	8	3	9	**1***	7	1	3	**2**	20	39	11	40	17	8	23	8	18	1*	5	2	9	6	21	35	2*	4	25	32	13	32	6182
9	Jeff Gordon	26	20	3*	18	14	3	2	31*	22	2	4*	11	6	32	4	5	4	3	3	23	6	10	27	11	13	12	6	11	5	9	**23**	20	8	37	11	37	6176
10	Clint Bowyer	4	8	8	23	40	7	9	36	7	12	32	17	7	9	22	31	7	17	4	4	15	32	13	4	7	6	1*	25	15	2	17	38	1	7	21	12	6155
11	Kurt Busch	23	6	**35**	1	3*	23	35	4	8	18	3	19	1*	6	**3**	32	3	7	26	10	33	2	40	9	6	18	13	4	13	21	30	16	30	24	9	18	6142
12	Jeff Burton	11	3	11	20	10	20	25	12	32*	4	8	2	25	7	8	27	12	5	7	6	8	9	24	16	4	13	15	2	18	23	20	9*	41	36	19	31	6033
Chase for the Sprint Cup cut-off
Pos.	Driver	DAY	CAL	LVS	ATL	BRI	MAR	PHO	TEX	TAL	RCH	DAR	DOV	CLT	POC	MCH	SON	NHA	DAY	CHI	IND	POC	GLN	MCH	BRI	ATL	RCH	NHA	DOV	KAN	CAL	CLT	MAR	TAL	TEX	PHO	HOM	Points
13	Mark Martin	**12**	4	4	33	35	21	4	6	5	25	16	15	4	29	16	14	21	28	15	11	7	19	28	23	21	20	29	12	14	6*	14	2	11	3	8	16	4364
14	Jamie McMurray	1	**17**	34	29	8	30	24	30	2	19	**2**	32	2	36	24	15	18	39	**5**	1	22	6	20	3	15	17	3	13	11	**17**	1	11	36	16	10	21	4325
15	Ryan Newman	34	36	18	17	16	4	1	11	35	8	9	13	**9**	14	32	16	6	26	22	17	12	12	23	6	8	11	8	8	9	5	36	30	23	20	2	7	4302
16	Joey Logano	20	5	6	35	**27**	2	10	28	36	16	27	10	13	13	10	33	9	29	19	9	25	33	10	18	27	4	35	3	17	11	7	6	5	4	3	39	4185
17	Juan Pablo Montoya	10	37	37	3	26	36	5	34	3	6	5	35	38	8	13	10	**34**	27	16	**32***	16	1*	7	7	9	7	16	14	29	14	11	19	**3**	28	16	35	4118
18	David Reutimann	5	15	13	40	38	28	20	37	14	15	11	5	5	15	18	20	15	11	1	28	17	23	16	2	16	19	7	35	35	10	9	27	4	15	26	38	4024
19	A. J. Allmendinger	32	25	25	6	17	38	**15**	13	19	17	37	14	14	10	11	13	10	36	14	16	24	4	17	31	18	8	12	10	10	19	25	12	32	14	18	5	3998
20	Kasey Kahne	30	34	9	4*	34	17	39	5	21	21	20	20	12	27	2	**4**	36*	2	6	13	19	17	**14**	5	32	29	14	28	**37**	4	38^{†}	14	26	13	30	**6**	3961
21	Dale Earnhardt Jr.	2	32	16	**15**	7	15	12	8	13	32	18	30	22	19	7	11	8	4	23	27	27	26	19	13	22	34	4	23	22	16	29	7	39*	25	14	27	3953
22	Martin Truex Jr.	6	39	20	27	12	5	17	9	12	7	19	**12**	23	25	17	42	22	35	11	26	9	15	8	17	12	22	20	34	20	18	15	29	6	38	15	11	3916
23	Paul Menard	13	18	17	5	18	14	29	35	25	27	30	21	8	16	25	22	28	18	10	14	13	16	35	21	35	26	28	7	8	22	24	13	13	10	29	19	3776
24	David Ragan	16	23	23	37	29	16	19	15	6	24	14	26	24	26	34	25	20	38	12	20	14	25	11	32	19	23	22	24	16	32	10	17	21	8	25	20	3599
25	Brad Keselowski	36	21	26	36	13	12	16	14	34	14	12	18	20	21	27	35	26	30	18	19	20	20	34	19	25	15	**18**	22	23	26	27	10	10	33	42	13	3485
26	Marcos Ambrose	41	35	14	11	33	11	11	17	37	9	25	36	36	30	15	6	13	32	28	21	39	3	15	20	10	5	30	20	34	33	16	34	34	12	22	26	3422
27	Elliott Sadler	24	24	27	19	20	24	31	18	33	38	21	28	21	31	21	17	19	22	21	38	34	29	9	29	41	27	21	17	28	13	26	28	14	**23**	28	28	3234
28	Regan Smith	39	19	21	14	36	32	26	21	38	30	17	24	19	18	23	38	33	33	20	33	21	34	21	30	17	25	19	26	26	12	13	31	12	22	23	17	3229
29	Sam Hornish Jr.	37	16	28	28	32	13	18	19	24	36	31	34	17	11	26	36	23	21	24	30	11	14	32	25	30	28	10	36	36	15	40	25	15	18	32	24	3214
30	Scott Speed	19	11	22	10	31	33	21	16	15	35	28	23	30	20	28	18	27	10	30	25	26	43	25	33	34	24	36	32	19	24	19	23	29	27	35	23	3178
31	Bobby Labonte	21	27	38	22	21	29	27	23	23	33	34	39	31	38	41	23	30	16	29	31	28	35	33	38	31	39	39	27	41	38	22	43	38	30	20	22	2583
32	David Gilliland	DNQ	26	30	26	23	19	32	29		31	35	25	26	33	35	19	35		32	DNQ	30	27	36	26	20	37	33	30	32	20	28	37	33	29	38	25	2445
33	Travis Kvapil	29	30	24	30	25	27	36	24	18	34	26	29	28	22	31	24	DNQ	34	31	24	29	30	30	22	29	35	32	33	33	28	31	35	DNQ	41	34	34	2426
34	Robby Gordon	28	33	32	43	22	34	14	26	20	28	38	31	33		33	2		12	38	36		36	39	40			26				33	22	18	35	33		2028
35	Kevin Conway (**R**)		31	36	31	28	31	33	27	30	37	33	33	35	35	40	28	32	14	33	34	31	31		36	37	41		37	38	31	DNQ	QL				30	1830
36	Casey Mears	DNQ	DNQ	DNQ	DNQ	30	DNQ				26	DNQ	22	29	23	36		29		40	DNQ	36		DNQ	39	26	21	38	29	24	25	DNQ	40	24	26	24	33	1573
37	Dave Blaney	DNQ	41	29	41	42	42	42	43	43	DNQ	42	41	43	40	DNQ	37	42	43	DNQ	41	42	DNQ		DNQ	24	30	31	43	31	29	32	36	42	42	37	36	1416
38	Joe Nemechek	43	40	41	38	43	39	38	40	42	43	DNQ	38	39	43	37	40	39	41	43	40	40	39	43	DNQ	38	42	40	41	DNQ	37	DNQ	41	27	43	DNQ	41	1361
39	Reed Sorenson	DNQ							39		41	43		DNQ				24	8	27	35	32		26	15	14		27	16	30	27	18						1355
40	Brian Vickers	15	12	31	7	15	6	37	38	29	20	10																										1158
41	Bill Elliott	27			16				25					27		29				37	18			22		23				25		35		40			15	1107
42	Mike Bliss	42	22	39	24	DNQ	25	DNQ	42	10	40	DNQ	40	DNQ				DNQ	9	41				DNQ	DNQ	42	QL	41	40	DNQ	DNQ	DNQ			39	39	43	1050
43	Max Papis	40	28	33	34	DNQ	40	40	22	40	DNQ	29	DNQ	DNQ	34	43	43	43	42	42	43	DNQ	22	41														907
44	J. J. Yeley											41	37	34	37	39	26	38	19	DNQ	DNQ	38	DNQ	DNQ	DNQ	40			42	42	42	43	39		DNQ	31	42	891
45	Michael McDowell	33	42	42	42		43	43	41		DNQ	40	42	42	39			41	DNQ	DNQ	42	43	42	42	43	39	DNQ	43	39	40	39	39	DNQ	35	DNQ	DNQ	DNQ	879
46	David Stremme					24	37	DNQ	DNQ	27	29	24	27	DNQ	24	30		31	37	36	DNQ	DNQ																825
47	Landon Cassill															38				39	39	41		38	37	DNQ	33	42	38	43	40	42	42	DNQ	40	40	40	717
48	Aric Almirola	DNQ	43	43	DNQ	39	41	DNQ		DNQ																							21	20	21	27	4	704
49	Tony Raines										42													31	28		38	34	31	39			32			36		534
50	Patrick Carpentier																						21	29		28				27	DNQ	37			31		DNQ	474
51	Andy Lally																	37					18					37			36	34			34		29	471
52	Boris Said	25	38	40	32												8						38															448
53	Todd Bodine	DNQ										39	DNQ	40		42		40	DNQ	DNQ	37	37			41	DNQ	DNQ											313
54	Robert Richardson Jr.	31								26									23															37				301
55	Michael Waltrip	18				41				39						DNQ	DNQ																	28				284
56	P. J. Jones																41					35	41	37														190
57	Jeff Green																								24		36	DNQ	DNQ			41			DNQ			186
58	Mattias Ekström																21										31											175
59	Terry Cook (**R**)	DNQ	DNQ	DNQ	DNQ	37	DNQ	34	DNQ	DNQ	39				DNQ																		DNQ					164
60	Johnny Sauter		DNQ				DNQ	41	DNQ	41			43	41		DNQ												DNQ				DNQ	DNQ	DNQ				154
61	Chad McCumbee														42																			22				134
62	Steve Park																		13																			129
63	Jan Magnussen																12																					127
64	Scott Riggs							28																DNQ	42	DNQ	DNQ								DNQ			116
65	Ken Schrader																																18					114
66	Trevor Bayne																																		17			112
67	Hermie Sadler																																26					85
68	Terry Labonte																										40									41		83
69	Jacques Villeneuve																				29																	76
70	Jason Leffler																									DNQ	43			DNQ	43	DNQ				DNQ		68
71	John Andretti	38																																				49
72	Ron Fellows																						40															43
73	Geoff Bodine														41																							40
74	Jeff Fuller	DNQ																																43				34
75	Brendan Gaughan																																			43		34
76	Brandon Ash							DNQ									DNQ																					0
77	Brian Simo																DNQ																					0
78	Josh Wise																												DNQ						DNQ			0
79	Ted Musgrave														DNQ														DNQ									0
80	Kevin Lepage																								DNQ													0
81	Tony Ave																						DNQ															0
82	Brian Keselowski																								DNQ		DNQ								DNQ			0
83	Derrike Cope	DNQ																																				0
84	Mike Wallace	DNQ																																				0
85	Norm Benning	DNQ																																				0
Pos.	Driver	DAY	CAL	LVS	ATL	BRI	MAR	PHO	TEX	TAL	RCH	DAR	DOV	CLT	POC	MCH	SON	NHA	DAY	CHI	IND	POC	GLN	MCH	BRI	ATL	RCH	NHA	DOV	KAN	CAL	CLT	MAR	TAL	TEX	PHO	HOM	Points
^{†} – Due to feeling sick, Kasey Kahne did not complete the race and during a caution, he was replaced by J. J. Yeley after he started and parked his normal No. 36 car. Since Kahne started the race, he is officially credited with the 38th-place finish.

Note:This list does not include exhibition races.

=== Manufacturer ===
Pos	Manufacturer	Wins	Points
1	Chevrolet	18	**261**
2	Toyota	12	**217**
3	Ford	4	**176**
4	Dodge	2	**138**

== Rookie entries ==
The Rookie of the Year Award winner was Kevin Conway. Conway ran 28 races with a best finish of 14th. The only other competitor, Terry Cook, managed to run only three races.

== See also ==
- 2010 NASCAR Nationwide Series
- 2010 NASCAR Camping World Truck Series
- 2010 ARCA Racing Series
- 2010 NASCAR Whelen Modified Tour
- 2010 NASCAR Whelen Southern Modified Tour
- 2010 NASCAR Canadian Tire Series
- 2010 NASCAR Corona Series
- 2010 NASCAR Mini Stock Series
