= 2010 Budweiser Shootout =

Race details
- Race 1 of 2 Exhibition Races in the 2010 NASCAR Sprint Cup Series
- Date: February 6, 2010
- Location: Daytona International Speedway, Daytona Beach, Florida
- Course: Permanent racing facility
- Course length: 2.5 miles (4 km)
- Distance: 76 laps, 190 mi (305.7 km)
- Weather: Temperatures up to 70 °F (21 °C); wind speeds up to 10 miles per hour (16 km/h)
- Average speed: 153.584 miles per hour (247.169 km/h)

Pole position
Driver	Carl Edwards	Roush Fenway Racing

Most laps led
Driver	Carl Edwards	Roush Fenway Racing
- Laps: 42

Winner
No. 29	Kevin Harvick	Richard Childress Racing

Television in the United States
- Network: Fox Broadcasting Network
- Announcers: Mike Joy, Darrell Waltrip, Larry McReynolds
- Nielsen ratings: 4.4/8 (Final); 4.2/7 (Overnight); (8.187 million)

The 2010 Budweiser Shootout was the first exhibition stock car race of the 2010 NASCAR Sprint Cup Series. It was held on February 6, 2010 at the Daytona International Speedway in Daytona Beach, Florida, before a crowd of 85,000. The 76-lap race was won by Kevin Harvick of the Richard Childress Racing team. It was Harvick's first victory of the season; Kasey Kahne finished second and Jamie McMurray came in third.

== Report ==
=== Background ===
Daytona International Speedway, where the race was held

Daytona International Speedway is one of six superspeedways to hold NASCAR races; the others are Michigan International Speedway, Auto Club Speedway, Indianapolis Motor Speedway, Pocono Raceway and Talladega Superspeedway. Its standard track is a four-turn, 2.5-mile (4.0 km) superspeedway. Daytona's turns are banked at 31 degrees, and the front stretch (the location of the finish line) is banked at 18 degrees.

The Budweiser Shootout was created by Busch Beer brand manager Monty Roberts as the Busch Clash in 1979. The race, designed to promote Busch Beer, invites the fastest NASCAR drivers from the previous season to compete. The race is considered a "warm-up" for the Daytona 500. It was renamed the Bud Shootout in 1998. The name changed to the Budweiser Shootout in 2001, and it was rebranded the Sprint Unlimited in 2013.

Twenty-eight drivers were eligible to compete in the race, including the twelve drivers that qualified for the 2009 Chase for the Sprint Cup and previous winners at Daytona (including the Daytona 500 and the Coke Zero 400). Past Sprint Cup Series champions and the reigning Rookie of the Year were also allowed to take part. Kevin Harvick was the defending champion. The race was scheduled to be 75 laps long, with two segments of 25 and 50 laps separated by a ten-minute pit stop. During the pit stop, teams could change tires, add fuel, and make normal chassis adjustments but could not change springs, shock absorbers or rear ends. Work could be done in the garage or on the pit road. Caution and green-flag laps were counted in the race.

=== Practice and qualification ===
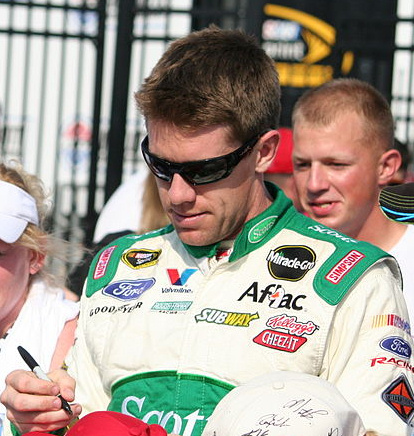
Carl Edwards (pictured in 2011) picked the pole position for Roush Fenway Racing.

Two practice sessions were held on Thursday evening. The first session lasted 45 minutes, while the second ran for 60 minutes. Kevin Harvick remained at his home in North Carolina to recover from symptoms of flu, and Jeff Burton and Clint Bowyer drove his car for the practice sessions. Burton had the fastest time (46.557 seconds, fifteen thousands of a second faster than Jamie McMurray) in the first practice session. Kyle Busch (with a time of 46.581 seconds) was third, ahead of Michael Waltrip and Mark Martin. Jimmie Johnson, Ryan Newman, Kasey Kahne, Joey Logano and Bowyer rounded out the top ten fastest drivers in the session and were six-tenths of a second within Burton's time. Denny Hamlin got into the rear of Martin in the first turn towards the end of the session, beginning a chain-reaction accident involving cars driven by Bowyer, Logano, Greg Biffle and Brian Vickers. McMurray, Martin, Bowyer, Biffle and Hamlin were required to use their backup cars. Kahne was fastest in the second practice session, with a time of 46.955 seconds. Ken Schrader was second, ahead of Matt Kenseth and Johnson. Tony Stewart was fifth fastest, with a time of 47.054 seconds. Vickers, Burton, Juan Pablo Montoya, Carl Edwards and Logano rounded out the session's top ten fastest drivers. John Andretti slowed which caused Kurt Busch to slow in avoidance; Montoya hit the rear of Kurt Busch which sent him into the wall. Kurt Busch was required to go into a backup car. Stewart drove to his garage in the middle of the session and had his radiator changed because debris went through it, and Johnson stopped his car after a completing one lap after the earlier accident.

The twenty-four drivers determined their starting positions by lot, a feature that is unique to the event. Edwards drew the pole position, with Harvick in second (which was chosen by his crew chief Gil Martin). Vickers, Newman and Biffle rounded out the top five positions. Martin drew sixth place and Burton drew seventh, ahead of Kenseth and McMurray in eighth and ninth. Andretti, Dale Earnhardt Jr., Bobby Labonte, Stewart and Schrader drew the next five positions. Waltrip, who drew fifteenth, was followed by Johnson, Kyle Busch, Derrike Cope, Kahne and Montoya for the first twenty spots. Logano (which was selected by his crew chief Greg Zipadelli because Logano was below the legal drinking age), Kurt Busch, Jeff Gordon and Hamlin drew the last positions in the race. Once the lot was completed, Edwards said, "It's the first race of the season, and it will be nice to be up front. It's been a while since I've been on a pole. I know I didn't earn this one, it's all luck, but it still feels good."

=== Race ===
The 2010 Budweiser Shootout was the first exhibition race of the season, and was televised live in the United States by Fox, which began at 8:10 EST. Weather conditions at the start of the race were clear with the air temperature at 56 °F (13 °C). Reverend L. Ronald Durham of the Greater Friendship Missionary Baptist Church, Daytona began pre-race ceremonies with an invocation. Country music band Zac Brown Band performed the national anthem and their lead singer Zac Brown commanded the drivers to start their engines. During the pace laps, Martin, Hamlin and Kurt Busch moved to the rear of the field because they had switched to their backup cars which were not used in the practice sessions; Montoya did the same because his team made adjustments outside of the car impound.

Edwards maintained his pole position advantage going into the first turn followed by Harvick and Vickers. Vickers moved into second place after exiting turn two, while Biffle moved ahead of Harvick for third.

== Results ==
=== Race results ===
Pos	Grid	Car	Driver	Team	Manufacturer	Laps Run
1	2	29	Kevin Harvick	Richard Childress Racing	Chevrolet	76
2	19	9	Kasey Kahne	Richard Petty Motorsports	Ford	76
3	9	1	Jamie McMurray	Earnhardt Ganassi Racing	Chevrolet	76
4	17	18	Kyle Busch	Joe Gibbs Racing	Toyota	76
5	24	11	Denny Hamlin	Joe Gibbs Racing	Toyota	76
6	23	24	Jeff Gordon	Hendrick Motorsports	Chevrolet	76
7	21	20	Joey Logano	Joe Gibbs Racing	Toyota	76
8	3	83	Brian Vickers	Red Bull Racing Team	Toyota	76
9	13	14	Tony Stewart	Stewart–Haas Racing	Chevrolet	76
10	20	42	Juan Pablo Montoya	Earnhardt Ganassi Racing	Chevrolet	76
11	11	88	Dale Earnhardt Jr.	Hendrick Motorsports	Chevrolet	76
12	7	31	Jeff Burton	Richard Childress Racing	Chevrolet	76
13	16	48	Jimmie Johnson	Hendrick Motorsports	Chevrolet	76
14	14	82	Ken Schrader	Red Bull Racing Team	Toyota	76
15	5	16	Greg Biffle	Roush Fenway Racing	Ford	74
16	8	17	Matt Kenseth	Roush Fenway Racing	Ford	74
17	1	99	Carl Edwards	Roush Fenway Racing	Ford	74
18	12	71	Bobby Labonte	TRG Motorsports	Chevrolet	74
19	4	39	Ryan Newman	Stewart–Haas Racing	Chevrolet	74
20	6	5	Mark Martin	Hendrick Motorsports	Chevrolet	74
21	15	51	Michael Waltrip	Michael Waltrip Racing	Toyota	69
22	10	34	John Andretti	Front Row Motorsports	Ford	69
23	22	2	Kurt Busch	Penske Racing	Dodge	32
24	18	75	Derrike Cope	Stratus Racing Group	Dodge	15
