= 2010 Lenox Industrial Tools 301 =

Race details
- Race 17 of 36 in the 2010 NASCAR Sprint Cup Series
- Date: June 27, 2010
- Official name: Lenox Industrial Tools 301
- Location: New Hampshire Motor Speedway in Loudon, New Hampshire.
- Course: Permanent racing facility
- Course length: 1.058 miles (1.703 km)
- Distance: 301 laps, 318.5 mi (512.6 km)
- Weather: Isolated thunderstorms with high around 79; wind out of the NNW at 6 mph. Chance of precipitation was 30%.
- Average speed: 113.308 miles per hour (182.352 km/h)

Pole position
Driver	Juan Pablo Montoya	Earnhardt Ganassi Racing
- Time: 28.78

Most laps led
Driver	Kasey Kahne	Richard Petty Motorsports
- Laps: 110

Winner
No. 48	Jimmie Johnson	Hendrick Motorsports

Television in the United States
- Network: Turner Network Television
- Announcers: Adam Alexander, Wally Dallenbach Jr. and Kyle Petty

The 2010 Lenox Industrial Tools 301 was a NASCAR Sprint Cup Series race held on June 27, 2010, at the New Hampshire Motor Speedway; contested over 301 laps, it was the seventeenth race of the 2010 Sprint Cup Series season. The event began at 1 p.m. EDT on TNT. It was also broadcast on the radio station Performance Racing Network at 12 p.m. EDT. The race was won by the Jimmie Johnson, driving for Hendrick Motorsports. Chevrolet driver Tony Stewart finished second, and Kurt Busch, was third driving a Dodge.

The race was Johnson's fifth win of the season, his third at New Hampshire, and the result meant that he would be second in the Drivers' Championship, 105 points behind of Kevin Harvick and six ahead of Kyle Busch. Chevrolet maintained their lead in the Manufacturers' Championship, 14 points ahead of Toyota and 47 ahead of Dodge, with 19 races of the season remaining.

== Report ==
=== Background ===
Prior to the race, Richard Childress Racing driver Kevin Harvick led the Drivers' Championship with 2,334 points, and Hendrick Motorsports driver Jimmie Johnson was second with 2,194 points. Behind them in the Drivers' Championship, Kyle Busch was third with 2,193 points in a Toyota, and Kyle Busch's teammate Denny Hamlin was fourth with 2,183 points. Jeff Gordon was fifth with 2,142 points. In the Manufacturers' Championship, Chevrolet were leading with 112 points, nine points ahead of their rival Toyota. In the battle for third place, Ford had 69 points, one point ahead of Dodge.

=== Practice and qualifying ===
Three practice sessions will be held before the Sunday race—one on Friday, and two on Saturday. The first session will last 90 minutes. The Saturday morning session will last 50 minutes, and the afternoon session will last 60 minutes. During the first session of practice, Juan Montoya was quickest, ahead of Jimmie Johnson and Kurt Busch in second and third. Tony Stewart followed in fourth as his teammate, Ryan Newman was scored fifth. In the morning session, Johnson was quickest. Kyle Busch, and Newman followed in third, and fourth while Kevin Harvick was fifth. In the third and final practice, Johnson was again quickest with a time of 29.166, over three tenths of a second faster than Jeff Burton in the second position. Kyle Busch was scored fourth, and Johnson's teammate Jeff Gordon was fifth.

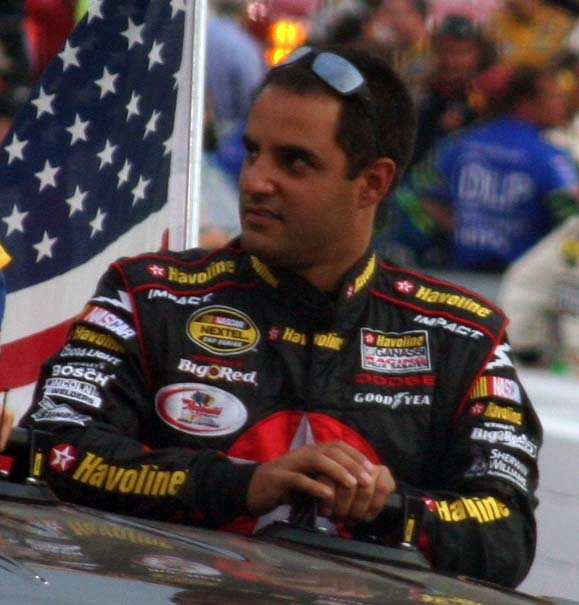
Juan Pablo Montoya sat on the pole with a qualifying time of 28.78.

During qualifying, forty-five cars were entered, but only forty-three was able to race because of NASCAR's qualifying procedure. Montoya clinched his third career pole position, with a time of 28.78. He was joined on the front row of the grid by Kasey Kahne. Kurt Busch qualified third; Rick Hendrick's driver Mark Martin qualified fourth. Newman started fifth, after keeping his speed from first practice. David Reutimann, Joe Nemechek, Sam Hornish Jr., Clint Bowyer and Johnson rounded off the top ten. The two drivers that did not qualify were Travis Kvapil and Mike Bliss.

=== Race summary ===
For the race, it was mostly cloudy with highs in the seventies. Steve Keller from Motor Racing Outreach began the pre-race ceremonies by giving the invocation. Afterward, Foghat Records recording artists Foghat performed the United States National Anthem then he & Dingeman family, representing Lenox Extra Mile Hero Pete Dingeman, gave the command to start engines. On the pace laps, Bobby Labonte had to go to the rear of the grid because of changing to a back-up car from an accident in first practice.

Juan Pablo Montoya led the field to the start, and he held the lead going through the first corner, as Kurt Busch passed Kasey Kahne for the second position. By lap six, Jeff Gordon had fallen to eighteenth after starting sixteenth. On the ninth lap, Jimmie Johnson moved into fifth after passing teammate Mark Martin. The field of drivers started to separate after lap 13, as Montoya led Kahne by 1.2 seconds. On lap 14, Max Papis went to the garage because of a brake failure. Over the following laps, Start and park drivers, including Todd Bodine, Michael McDowell and Dave Blaney, went to the garage. Jeff Burton moved into the tenth position after passing Sam Hornish Jr., as Johnson and Clint Bowyer moved to fourth and fifth because of passing Ryan Newman.

Afterward, Montoya's lead over the rest changed to barely nothing when the first caution came out because of debris on lap 34. Most driver came to pit road for pit stops, as Elliott Sadler and David Gilliland stayed out to gain five bonus points for leading a lap. Kahne became the leader on the restart, as Sadler and Gilliland came to pit road. Kyle Busch moved into second, after restarting fourth, but on the next lap he fell back to the fourth position because Montoya and Kurt Busch passed him. Johnson moved into third after passing Mark Martin, Joey Logano, and Kyle Busch, as Gilliland made an unexpected pit stop. A few laps later, Gilliland drove to the garage. By lap 72, Kahne had a 1.8 second lead over Montoya, as Tony Stewart moved into eighth after passing Mark Martin.

Then, Johnson passed Montoya for second, as Kahne lapped Bobby Labonte. On lap 85, Jeff Gordon passed Kyle Busch for the sixth position. On the next lap green flag pit stops began, as Stewart came in early because of not filling the car with fuel completely. Jeff Burton moved into fourth, after passing Kurt Busch. On lap 106, Kahne came to pit road, as Johnson passes him for the lead. As Johnson, made a pit stop, Kurt Busch, Ryan Newman, became the leaders. Johnson had a slow pit stop, and moved him back into the ninth position as Kahne became the leader with Kyle Busch in second after he passed Stewart. On lap 120, Jeff Gordon and Kurt Busch moved into fifth and sixth, after passing Stewart. After a multi-lap battle with Montoya, Burton moved into third, as Montoya loses another position to Jeff Gordon. On lap 153, Kyle Busch passed Kahne for the lead, with some help from cars that are a lap down.

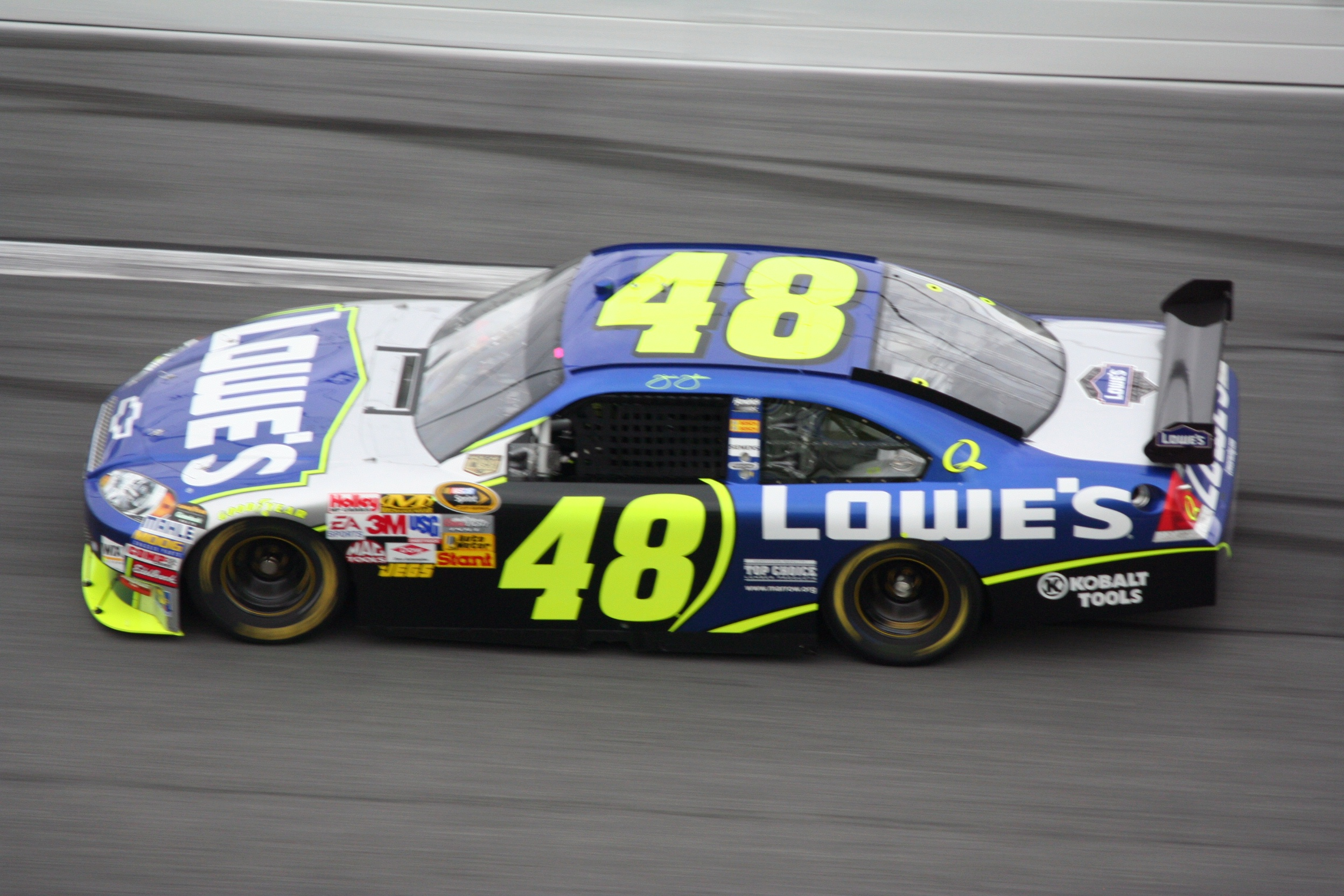
Jimmie Johnson claimed his 52nd career victory after this race.

A few laps later, Stewart made a pit stop because of being off schedule with the rest of the teams. On lap 164, Regan Smith had a punctured tire and went to pit road safely. Afterward, Smith had a drive-through penalty for exceeding the pit road speed limit. On lap 171, the second green flag pit stops began, as Kahne was catching Kyle Busch. Six laps later, Kyle Busch went to pit road, and allowed Kahne to become the leader, but he would inherit the lead two laps later. After the pit stops, Kyle Busch was in the first position, ahead of Kahne and Burton in second and third. Stewart, who made a pit stop before everyone else, was again losing positions as Montoya passed him for the fifth position. Jeff Burton passed Kahne seven laps later, as Kyle Busch led with a 1.9 second lead.

Around lapped traffic, Jeff Burton caught and passed Kyle Busch on lap 201. Kahne became slow and reported to is team that he was having engine troubles on lap 205. By lap 219, Burton had a 2.2 second lead over second place Kyle Busch. On lap 228, A. J. Allmendinger moved into the seventh position, as Johnson moved to fifth after passing Jeff Gordon. On lap 233, green flag pit stops began as Regan Smith came to pit road. Five laps later, the second caution came out because Kahne's engine blew. This run consisted of 201 lap, a new record at New Hampshire Motor Speedway. Jeff Burton had a great start, retaining his position, as Kyle Busch maintained second.

Three laps later, Montoya and Jeff Gordon were colliding with each other, as Gordon passed Montoya. On lap 251, Johnson passed Kyle Busch for the second position, as Montoya had fallen to the eighth position. By lap 259, Johnson had begun closing on Burton. Kevin Harvick moved into the seventh position on lap 261. Johnson had caught Burton by lap 272, but the third caution was given because Montoya collided with the wall. On the next lap, Burton stayed off pit road as the rest came in. Johnson passed Burton for the lead on the restart because of Burton's older tires. Later on the same lap, the fourth caution came out because Kyle Busch spun sideways. Johnson led the drivers to the first turn, but Kurt Busch collided in the back of Johnson's car and made the pass. On the last lap, Johnson collided with Kurt Busch, making Busch move up the track, as Johnson passed him. Johnson crossed the line first to win his fifth race of the season and his fifty-second overall victory. Stewart finished second, ahead of Kurt Busch and Jeff Gordon in third and fourth. In the Drivers' Championship Harvick maintained the points lead, 105 ahead of Johnson in second and 161 points ahead of Kyle Busch.

== Results ==
Pos	Grid	Car	Driver	Team	Make
1	10	48	Jimmie Johnson	Hendrick Motorsports	Chevrolet
2	25	14	Tony Stewart	Stewart–Haas Racing	Chevrolet
3	3	2	Kurt Busch	Penske Racing	Dodge
4	16	24	Jeff Gordon	Hendrick Motorsports	Chevrolet
5	24	29	Kevin Harvick	Richard Childress Racing	Chevrolet
6	5	39	Ryan Newman	Stewart–Haas Racing	Chevrolet
7	9	33	Clint Bowyer	Richard Childress Racing	Chevrolet
8	31	88	Dale Earnhardt Jr.	Hendrick Motorsports	Chevrolet
9	11	20	Joey Logano	Joe Gibbs Racing	Toyota
10	28	43	A. J. Allmendinger	Richard Petty Motorsports	Ford
11	22	18	Kyle Busch	Joe Gibbs Racing	Toyota
12	17	31	Jeff Burton	Richard Childress Racing	Chevrolet
13	12	47	Marcos Ambrose	JTG Daugherty Racing	Toyota
14	20	11	Denny Hamlin	Joe Gibbs Racing	Toyota
15	6	00	David Reutimann	Michael Waltrip Racing	Toyota
16	34	16	Greg Biffle	Roush Fenway Racing	Ford
17	33	17	Matt Kenseth	Roush Fenway Racing	Ford
18	27	1	Jamie McMurray	Earnhardt Ganassi Racing	Chevrolet
19	30	19	Elliott Sadler	Richard Petty Motorsports	Ford
20	19	6	David Ragan	Roush Fenway Racing	Ford
21	4	5	Mark Martin	Hendrick Motorsports	Chevrolet
22	26	56	Martin Truex Jr.	Michael Waltrip Racing	Toyota
23	8	77	Sam Hornish Jr.	Penske Racing	Dodge
24	29	83	Reed Sorenson	Team Red Bull	Toyota
25	21	99	Carl Edwards	Roush Fenway Racing	Ford
26	14	12	Brad Keselowski	Penske Racing	Dodge
27	15	82	Scott Speed	Team Red Bull	Toyota
28	13	98	Paul Menard	Richard Petty Motorsports	Ford
29	23	36	Casey Mears	Tommy Baldwin Racing	Chevrolet
30	42	7	Bobby Labonte	TRG Motorsports	Toyota
31	38	26	David Stremme	Latitude 43 Motorsports	Ford
32	41	34	Kevin Conway	Front Row Motorsports	Ford
33	18	78	Regan Smith	Furniture Row Racing	Chevrolet
34	1	42	Juan Pablo Montoya	Earnhardt Ganassi Racing	Chevrolet
35	39	37	David Gilliland	Front Row Motorsports	Ford
36	2	9	Kasey Kahne	Richard Petty Motorsports	Ford
37	40	71	Andy Lally	TRG Motorsports	Chevrolet
38	35	46	J. J. Yeley	Whitney Motorsports	Dodge
39	7	87	Joe Nemechek	NEMCO Motorsports	Toyota
40	43	64	Todd Bodine	Gunselman Motorsports	Toyota
41	37	55	Michael McDowell	Prism Motorsports	Toyota
42	36	66	Dave Blaney	Prism Motorsports	Toyota
43	32	13	Max Papis	Germain Racing	Toyota
44	45	38	Travis Kvapil	Front Row Motorsports	Ford
45	44	09	Mike Bliss	Phoenix Racing	Chevrolet

Previous race: 2010 Toyota/Save Mart 350	Sprint Cup Series; 2010 season	Next race: 2010 Coke Zero 400
