= Kenny Francis =

American NASCAR crew chief

- Born: December 1, 1969 (age 56) Jacksonville, Florida, U.S.

Monster Energy NASCAR Cup Series
- Years active: 2003–2018
- Teams: Evernham Motorsports, Hendrick Motorsports
- Starts: 405
- Wins: 17
- Poles: 21
- Best finish: 4th (Kasey Kahne) in 2012

Previous series
- 1996–1998, 2008: NASCAR Nationwide Series

Championship titles
- 1999: NASCAR Winston Cup Series

Kenneth Francis (born December 1, 1969) is an American NASCAR crew chief. He began his racing career at the age of eight, racing go-karts. He continued to drive the race car until 1996 when he began working on engines for Butch Mock Motorsports. Six years later, Francis became a crew chief for the first time while he was employed at Robert Yates Racing. He is currently employed at Hendrick Motorsports as the Vehicle Technical Director organization-wide.

== Early life ==
Born on December 1, 1969, in Jacksonville, Florida, Francis began racing go-karts at the age of eight. While racing the go-karts, he managed to win a state championship. Afterward, Francis moved to regional and national circuits. During the late 1980s, he began racing late model stock cars, while being educated about mechanical engineering at the University of Florida. At the time, he was also working at a local power company, as well as traveling to tracks further away in Myrtle Beach, South Carolina, and South Boston, Virginia.

== NASCAR career ==
In 1996, Francis stopped driving the car, and began working on the engines for a local team racing in the NASCAR Busch Series While working with the team, he learned about fabrication, and the set ups of the cars. Two years later, Francis moved to North Carolina. Also in 1998, he began working with Rick Mast at Butch Mock Motorsports. After one year working with the team, Francis was hired at Robert Yates Racing to work on Dale Jarret's team. During the season, his team won four races, as well as the 1999 Winston Cup Series championship. He remained with the team until the end of the 2000 season, when he was offered to become the team engineer at Evernham Motorsports for Bill Elliott. For the 2003 season, he was promoted and became the crew chief and team director for Jeremy Mayfield. By the 2004 season, Francis helped the team to make the Chase for the Nextel Cup in its first year and win a race. In 2005, his team made the Chase, as well as winning one more race.

During the following season, he became the crew chief for Kasey Kahne, which led to two consecutive fourth-place finishes, and a win at Atlanta Motor Speedway in the spring. At the end of the season, his team was able to record six wins, 12 top fives, 19 top tens, six pole positions, led 744 laps, and finished eighth in the standings. In 2007, Francis and Kahne failed to win a race, as George Gillett became part owner. During 2008, Francis continued to work with Kahne, and won two races: the Sprint All-Star Race and Coca-Cola 600. Afterward, Richard Petty became partial owner of the team, renaming it to Richard Petty Motorsports. During the season, they recorded two wins, seven top fives and finished tenth in points. He also recorded 27 lead lap finishes, the most throughout the season. In the 2010, they won the second Gatorade Duel race. Also during the season, Kahne decided to leave Richard Petty Motorsports to race for Red Bull Racing Team. Francis decided to follow Kahne, after recording ten wins, 30 top fives and 12 pole positions in six seasons. For the 2012 season, Kahne moved to Hendrick Motorsports. Still with Francis, Kahne won two races, four pole positions, 12 top-five finishes and 19 top-ten finishes, and recorded a career best fourth-place finish in the final points. Francis continued as crew chief for the No. 5 Hendrick Motorsports team for the 2014 season. In 2015, Francis was part-time crew chief for the No. 25 driven by Chase Elliott. In 2018, Francis was Elliott's interim crew chief on the No. 9 team while Alan Gustafson was serving a two-race suspension.
