= 2010 Coca-Cola 600 =

Race details
- Race 13 of 36 in the 2010 NASCAR Sprint Cup Series
- The 2010 Coca-Cola 600 program cover, with artwork by Sam Bass. The painting is called "Let Freedom Race!"
- Date: May 30, 2010
- Official name: Coca-Cola 600
- Location: Charlotte Motor Speedway; Concord, North Carolina
- Course: Permanent racing facility
- Course length: 1.5 miles (2.4 km)
- Distance: 400 laps, 600 mi (970 km)
- Weather: Partly cloudy with a high around 84°; wind out of the ESE at 3 mph; 10% chance of precipitation.
- Average speed: 144.966 miles per hour (233.300 km/h)

Pole position
Driver	Ryan Newman	Stewart Haas Racing
- Time: 28.793

Most laps led
Driver	Kurt Busch	Penske Racing
- Laps: 252

Winner
No. 2	Kurt Busch	Penske Racing

Television in the United States
- Network: Fox
- Announcers: Mike Joy, Darrell Waltrip, and Larry McReynolds

The 2010 Coca-Cola 600, the 51st running of the event, was a NASCAR Sprint Cup Series race held on May 30, 2010 at Charlotte Motor Speedway in Concord, North Carolina as the 13th race of the 2010 Sprint Cup season It also was the longest race of the 2010 season: over 400 laps and 600 miles (970 km).

The race logo for the 2010 Coca-Cola 600.

Kurt Busch, driving the No. 2 car for Penske Racing, won the race while Jamie McMurray for Earnhardt Ganassi Racing (whose team won the Indianapolis 500) finished second. The race had 17 different leaders, 34 lead changes, and eight cautions.

== Race report ==
=== Background ===
Charlotte Motor Speedway, where the race was held.

Charlotte Motor Speedway is one of ten intermediate tracks to hold NASCAR races; the others are Atlanta Motor Speedway, Kansas Speedway, Chicagoland Speedway, Darlington Raceway, Homestead-Miami Speedway, New Hampshire Motor Speedway, Kentucky Speedway, Las Vegas Motor Speedway, and Texas Motor Speedway. The standard track at Lowe's Motor Speedway is a four-turn, 1.5-mile (2.4 km)-long, quad-oval track. The track's turns are banked at twenty-four degrees; both the front stretch (the location of the finish line) and the back stretch (opposite the front) have a five-degree banking.

The Coca-Cola 600 was conceived by race car driver Curtis Turner who built the Charlotte Motor Speedway. It was first held in 1960 in an attempt by NASCAR to stage a Memorial Day weekend race to compete with the open-wheel Indianapolis 500; the two races were held together on the same day starting from 1974. The race is the longest in terms of distance on the NASCAR calendar and is considered by several drivers to be one of the sport's most important races alongside the Daytona 500, the Brickyard 400 and the Southern 500. The long distance makes it the most physically demanding event in NASCAR, and teams adapt to changing track conditions because the race occurs between late afternoon and evening. It was known as the World 600 until 1984 when The Coca-Cola Company purchased the naming rights to the race and renamed it the Coca-Cola World 600 in 1985. It has been called the Coca-Cola 600 every year since 1986 except for 2002 when the name changed to Coca-Cola Racing Family 600.

=== Practice and qualifying ===
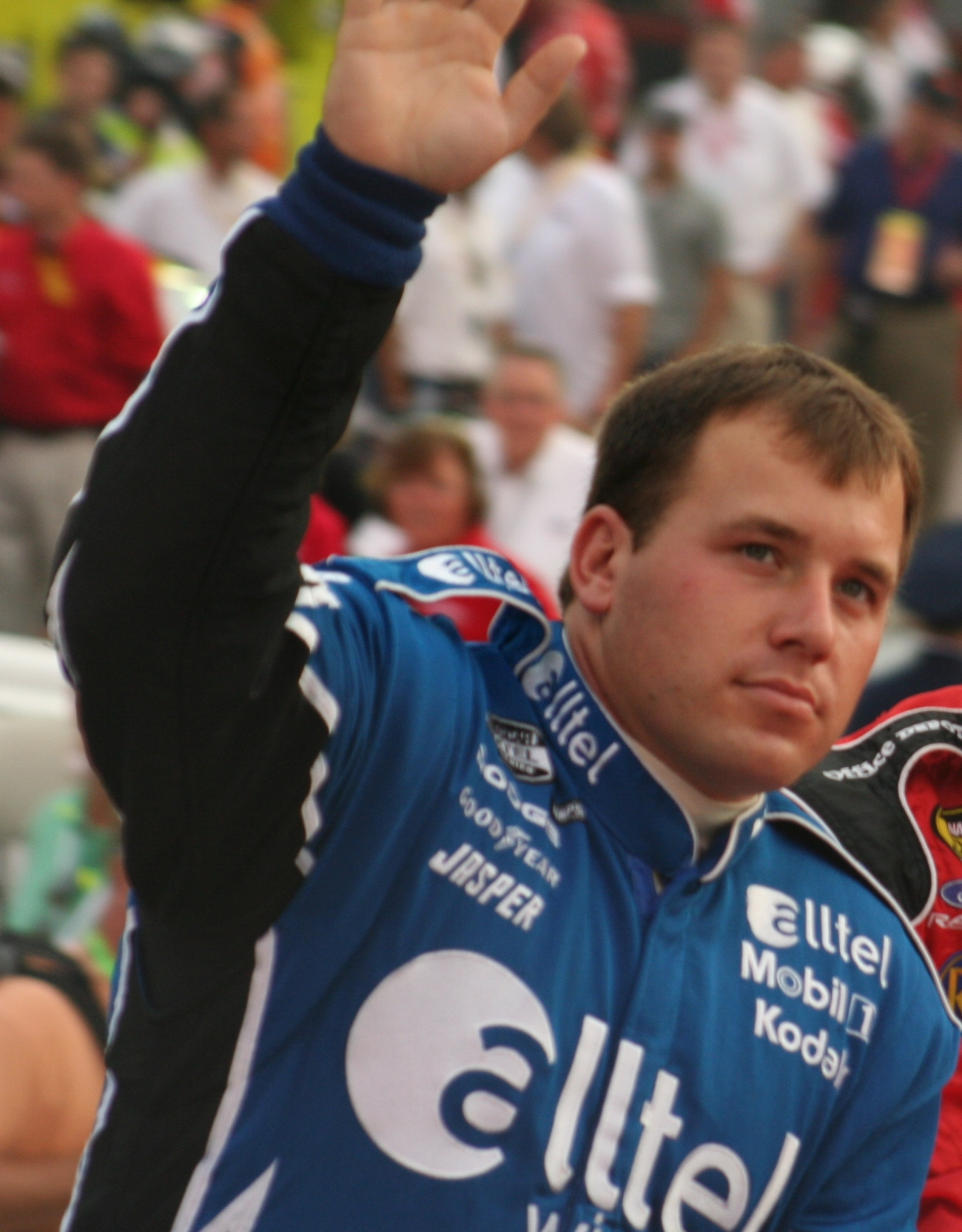
Pole Position winner Ryan Newman in 2007

Three practice sessions and qualifying were held before the Sunday evening race; one practice and qualifying on Thursday and two on Saturday. In the first practice, Juan Pablo Montoya was quickest, ahead of Ryan Newman in second, Jimmie Johnson in third, Elliott Sadler in fourth, and Kasey Kahne in fifth. In the second practice, Kasey Kahne was fastest while Kurt Busch, David Reutimann, Jimmie Johnson, and Jeff Burton followed. During final practice, the quickest five were Martin Truex Jr., Denny Hamlin, Kasey Kahne, Greg Biffle, and Jimmie Johnson.

In qualifying, Ryan Newman won the pole position, while Kurt Busch, Martin Truex Jr., Kasey Kahne, and Jimmie Johnson completed the top-five positions. During qualifying, Brad Keselowski and David Ragan both spun, but Keselowski collided with the wall. Four drivers did not make the race; they were Reed Sorenson, Max Papis, David Stremme, and Mike Bliss.

=== Race summary ===
At 5:00 p.m. EDT, Fox started broadcasting; the race would be the last they would broadcast until the 2011 Daytona 500. At the start of the race, the weather was predicted to be mostly cloudy. At 5:55 p.m. EDT, pre-race ceremonies began; first, Dr. James Dobson, founder of Focus on the Family, delivered the invocation. Afterward, the track hosted a moment of silence. Then, the national anthem, was performed by the U.S. National Guard choir. To start engines, John Faulkenbury, President of the USO, N.C. joined by the Dickens (USMC), Foley (U.S. Army) and Barnes (U.S. Air Force) gave the command "Gentlemen, Start Your Engines!"

At 6:20 p.m., the green flag waved as Ryan Newman led the field down to the start/finish line. On lap 3, Jimmie Johnson said that he believed there was oil on the track. Outside polesitter Kurt Busch passed Newman a short time later and pulled away from Newman with a 2.30-second advantage by lap 24. On lap 29, Busch started putting cars a lap down. Green flag pit stops began on lap 50 when Kasey Kahne made a pit stop. On lap 52, Busch gave the lead to Joey Logano when he made his pit stop. Two laps later, Busch reclaimed the lead. The first caution of the race came out on lap 61 Juan Pablo Montoya spun and hit the inside wall. Denny Hamlin stayed off pit road, while most drivers made pit stops.

The race started on lap 66, with Hamlin in the lead. A lap later, Kurt Busch retook the lead from Hamlin. The second caution came out on lap 91 Marcos Ambrose collided with the wall. Most leaders would pitt under this caution. The race started on lap 95 with Jimmie Johnson in the lead. A lap later, Kurt Busch passed him for the lead, but couldn't keep it. So Johnson retook the lead and remained there until lap 130, when Kyle Busch took it. Three laps later, the race passed its 200-mile mark. On lap 144, another round of green flag pit stops began. The different leaders during pit stops were Ku. Busch and Jamie McMurray, but Ky. Busch reclaimed the lead on lap 150. The third caution came out on lap 166 when Johnson got loose, collided with the outside wall, came down the track, and shoved Hamlin in the grass. Most lead lap cars made pit stops but during the yellow-flag pit stops, Ky. Busch collided with Brad Keselowski while exiting pit road.

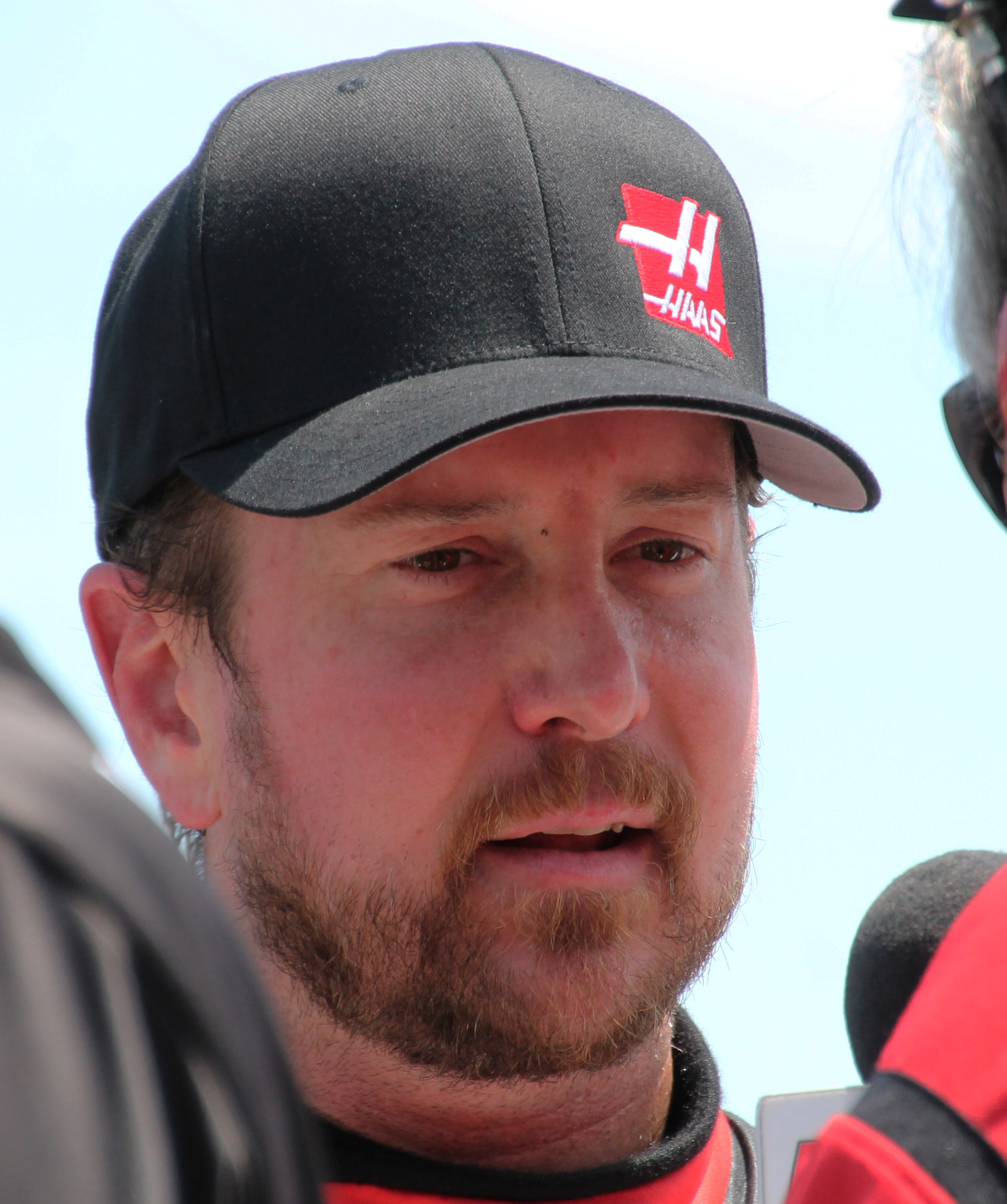
Race winner Kurt Busch (pictured in 2015)

On the restart, Kurt Bush led them to the green flag. Afterwards, he led until lap 213, when the fourth caution came out for debris. The restart happened on lap 217, with Clint Bowyer the new leader. One lap later, Kurt Busch reclaimed the lead. Kurt Busch led until green flag pit stops which began on lap 264. On lap 267, David Reutimann passed Kurt Busch for the lead. Two laps later, Reutimann made a pit stop, giving the lead to Matt Kenseth. On lap 272, the fifth caution came out. The cause of the caution was that Jimmie Johnson got loose, spun around, collided with the outside wall, then he went down the track and hit the inside wall; his car sustained heavy damage. On lap 277, Matt Kenseth brought the field to the restart. One lap later, Kurt Busch, from a fast start, passed Kenseth.

Kurt Busch led the race until lap 299 when Jamie McMurray passed him. One lap later, Robby Gordon collided with the wall, and brought out a caution. During pit stops, Brad Keselowski stayed out to lead a lap, then he gave the lead to Kurt Busch when he made a pit stop. Two laps after the 306 restart, the seventh caution came out because Greg Biffle collided with the wall. On lap 313, Kurt Busch brought the field for the restart. After chasing down Kurt Busch, Jamie McMurray finally reclaimed the lead. On lap 350, green flag pit stops began; one lap later Jamie McMurray and Kurt Busch made pit stops, giving the lead back to David Reutimann. On lap 353, Reutimann made a pit stop and gave the lead to Tony Stewart, then he made a pit stop to give the lead to David Ragan and Dale Earnhardt Jr. Earnhardt Jr. stayed out until lap 366, when he made a pit stop. Jamie McMurray was the leader afterwards. On lap 376, the eighth caution came out because Marcos Ambrose lost control and collided with the wall. During pit stops, Jeff Gordon and Mark Martin stayed out, to start first and second on the restart on lap 381. One lap later, Kurt Busch surged by the field to become the leader. Kurt Busch remained the leader to win his second race in the 2010 season.

== Results ==
=== Race results ===
Race results
Pos	Grid	Car	Driver	Team	Manufacturer	Laps	Points
1	2	2	Kurt Busch	Penske Racing	Dodge	400	195
2	27	1	Jamie McMurray	Earnhardt Ganassi Racing	Chevrolet	400	175
3	9	18	Kyle Busch	Joe Gibbs Racing	Toyota	400	170
4	11	5	Mark Martin	Hendrick Motorsports	Chevrolet	400	160
5	6	00	David Reutimann	Michael Waltrip Racing	Toyota	400	160
6	15	24	Jeff Gordon	Hendrick Motorsports	Chevrolet	400	155
7	10	33	Clint Bowyer	Richard Childress Racing	Chevrolet	400	151
8	33	98	Paul Menard	Richard Petty Motorsports	Ford	400	142
9	1	39	Ryan Newman	Stewart Haas Racing	Chevrolet	400	143
10	16	17	Matt Kenseth	Roush Fenway Racing	Ford	400	139
11	23	29	Kevin Harvick	Richard Childress Racing	Chevrolet	400	130
12	4	9	Kasey Kahne	Richard Petty Motorsports	Ford	400	127
13	8	20	Joey Logano	Joe Gibbs Racing	Toyota	400	129
14	18	43	A. J. Allmendinger	Richard Petty Motorsports	Ford	400	121
15	26	14	Tony Stewart	Stewart Haas Racing	Chevrolet	400	123
16	31	99	Carl Edwards	Roush Fenway Racing	Ford	400	115
17	14	77	Sam Hornish Jr.	Penske Racing	Dodge	400	112
18	7	11	Denny Hamlin	Joe Gibbs Racing	Toyota	400	114
19	32	78	Regan Smith	Furniture Row Racing	Chevrolet	400	106
20	37	12	Brad Keselowski	Penske Racing	Dodge	400	108
21	39	19	Elliott Sadler	Richard Petty Motorsports	Ford	400	100
22	24	88	Dale Earnhardt Jr.	Hendrick Motorsports	Chevrolet	400	102
23	3	56	Martin Truex Jr.	Michael Waltrip Racing	Toyota	400	99
24	36	6	David Ragan	Roush Fenway Racing	Ford	400	96
25	12	31	Jeff Burton	Richard Childress Racing	Chevrolet	399	88
26	28	37	David Gilliland	Front Row Motorsports	Ford	398	90
27	25	21	Bill Elliott	Wood Brothers Racing	Ford	397	82
28	41	38	Travis Kvapil	Front Row Motorsports	Ford	397	79
29	13	83	Casey Mears	Team Red Bull	Toyota	396	76
30	21	82	Scott Speed	Team Red Bull	Toyota	395	73
31	38	71	Bobby Labonte	TRG Motorsports	Chevrolet	395	70
32	40	16	Greg Biffle	Roush Fenway Racing	Ford	394	67
33	36	7	Robby Gordon	Robby Gordon Motorsports	Toyota	394	64
34	43	46	J. J. Yeley	Whitney Motorsports	Dodge	393	61
35	42	34	Kevin Conway	Front Row Mototsports	Ford	393	58
36	34	47	Marcos Ambrose	JTG Daugherty Racing	Toyota	375	55
37	5	48	Jimmie Johnson	Hendrick Motorsports	Chevrolet	364	57
38	20	42	Juan Pablo Montoya	Earnhardt Ganassi Racing	Chevrolet	306	49
39	19	87	Joe Nemechek	NEMCO Motorsports	Toyota	46	46
40	29	64	Todd Bodine	Kirk Shelmerdine Racing	Toyota	41	43
41	22	36	Johnny Sauter	Tommy Baldwin Racing	Chevrolet	37	40
42	30	55	Michael McDowell	Prism Motorsports	Toyota	34	37
43	17	66	Dave Blaney	Prism Motorsports	Toyota	25	34

Previous race: 2010 Autism Speaks 400	Sprint Cup Series; 2010 season	Next race: 2010 Gillette Fusion ProGlide 500
