= 2010 Autism Speaks 400 =

2010 Autism Speaks 400 presented by Hershey's Milk & Milkshakes
Race details
- Race 12 of 36 in the 2010 NASCAR Sprint Cup Series
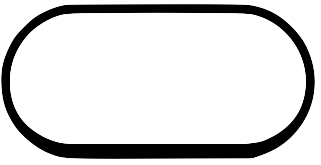
- Layout of Dover International Speedway
- Date: May 16, 2010
- Official name: Autism Speaks 400
- Location: Dover International Speedway Dover, Delaware
- Course: Permanent racing facility
- Course length: 1.0 miles (1.61 km)
- Distance: 400 laps, 400 mi (643.74 km)
- Weather: Partly cloudy with a high of 75; wind out of the NE at 8 mph.
- Average speed: 126 miles per hour (203 km/h)

Pole position
Driver	Martin Truex Jr.	Michael Waltrip Racing
- Time: 22.884

Most laps led
Driver	Jimmie Johnson	Hendrick Motorsports
- Laps: 225

Winner
No. 18	Kyle Busch	Joe Gibbs Racing

Television in the United States
- Network: Fox Broadcasting Company
- Announcers: Mike Joy, Darrell Waltrip and Larry McReynolds

The 2010 Autism Speaks 400 presented by Hershey's Milk & Milkshakes was the twelfth race of the 2010 NASCAR Sprint Cup Series season held at Dover International Speedway in Dover, Delaware. The race started at 1 p.m. EST on May 16, 2010, and was broadcast on Fox and MRN radio starting at 12 p.m. Martin Truex Jr. started in the pole position. The race had eight different leaders, twenty lead changes, and five cautions. The winner of the race was Kyle Busch, while Jeff Burton and Matt Kenseth finished second and third respectively.

== Race report ==
=== Practices and qualifying ===
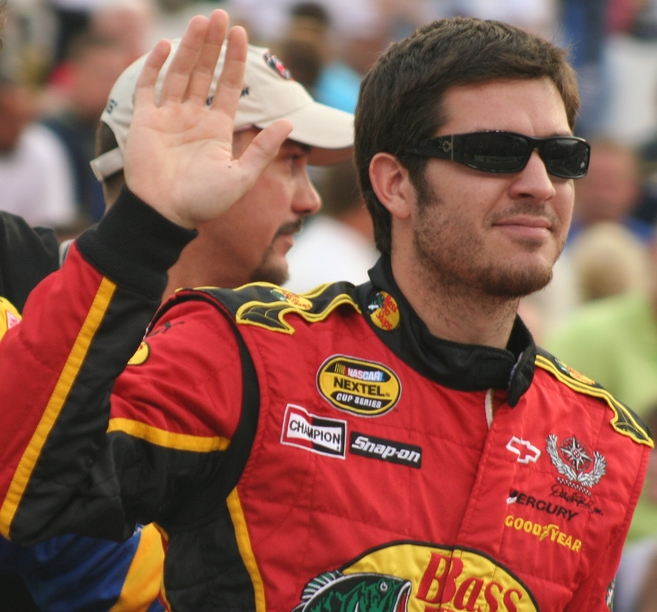
Polesitter Martin Truex Jr. in 2007.

In first practice, the quickest drivers were Jimmie Johnson, Clint Bowyer, Kasey Kahne, Martin Truex Jr., and Kyle Busch. During qualifying, Martin Truex Jr. won the pole position, while Kasey Kahne, Mark Martin, Kyle Busch, and Jimmie Johnson started in the two rows behind him. Also, two drivers failed to qualify for the race; they were Todd Bodine and Max Papis. In second practice, the quickest drivers were Jimmie Johnson, David Ragan, Kyle Busch, Clint Bowyer, and Kasey Kahne. In the final practice the quickest drivers were Kyle Busch, Denny Hamlin, Carl Edwards, A. J. Allmendinger, and Clint Bowyer.

=== Race summary ===
The pre-race ceremonies began with Reverend Jonathan Falwell of Thomas Road Baptist Church in Lynchburg, Virginia ., delivered the invocation. Then, country music artist, Joe Nichols performed the national anthem. To start the engines, Richard Petty, part of the inaugural class at the NASCAR Hall of Fame, gave the command, "Gentlemen, start your engines!"

At 1:17 p.m. EDT, the green flag waved with Martin Truex Jr. the leader. On the same lap, though, Kasey Kahne, who started second, passed Truex Jr. to lead the first lap. On lap 26, Jimmie Johnson, who started in the fifth position, passed Kahne for the lead. As Johnson led, Johnny Sauter, on lap 40, went to the garage because of electrical problems. Fourteen laps later, the caution flag waved as Sam Hornish Jr. collided with the wall because of a flat tire. All the lead-lap driver came onto pit road for their first pit stops . After finishing the pit stops, Johnson led the field to the green flag on lap 59. One lap later, Kyle Busch passed Johnson for the lead.

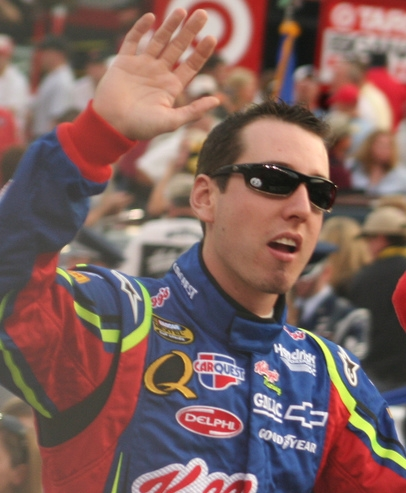
Race winner Kyle Busch in 2007

Kyle Busch kept the lead until lap 85 when Jimmie Johnson passed him. On laps 125 through 137, green flag pit stops were occurring. The leaders during the pit stops were Kurt Busch and Jeff Burton. Johnson, then regained the lead from Burton on lap 137; the rest of the top five were Kyle Busch, A. J. Allmendinger, Joey Logano, and Tony Stewart. As Johnson led on lap 157, J. J. Yeley went to the garage due to engine problems. On lap 165, the second caution flag waved because Marcos Ambrose collided with the wall. All lead lap cars made pit stops; Johnson remained the leader. On lap 170, Johnson led the field to the green flag, but one lap later, Kyle Busch passed Johnson for the lead.

Kyle Busch led until Johnson passed him on lap 176. The green flag stayed out until lap 255, when Marcos Ambrose collided with the wall to bring out the third caution. On the restart, on lap 231, Johnson led the field to the green flag. On lap 234, Kyle Busch passed Johnson, but two laps later, he reclaimed the lead. On lap 245, Sam Hornish Jr. collided with the wall, which brought out the fourth caution. All lead lap cars pit, most getting fuel and two tires, but Matt Kenseth stayed out. From staying off pit road, Kenseth led the field to green on lap 250. On lap 261, Johnson reclaimed the lead from Matt Kenseth. Marcos Ambrose, who collided with the wall twice, announced that he was out of the race on lap 279.

On lap 287, the fifth caution came out because Kurt Busch collided with the wall in turn four. All the leaders made pit stops, most getting four tires and fuel. On lap 291, Jimmie Johnson led the field to the green flag. One lap later, Kyle Busch passed Johnson for the lead. Kyle Busch led until lap 353, when Johnson passed him, but for the next two laps Johnson and Busch switched the lead until Johnson claimed it. On lap 364, David Reutimann became the leader, as Johnson and Kyle Busch made their green flag pit stops. On lap 365, Martin Truex Jr. passed Reutimann for the lead. One lap later, it was announced that Jimmie Johnson, who led the most laps, received a penalty for speeding on pit road. On lap 367, Johnson came to pit road to serve his penalty and Kyle Busch reclaimed the lead. He kept the lead to win his second race of 2010 and his eighteenth win in his Sprint Cup Series career.

== Results ==
Pos	Grid	No.	Driver	Team	Manufacturer
1	4	18	Kyle Busch	Joe Gibbs Racing	Toyota
2	17	31	Jeff Burton	Richard Childress Racing	Chevrolet
3	21	17	Matt Kenseth	Roush Fenway Racing	Ford
4	14	11	Denny Hamlin	Joe Gibbs Racing	Toyota
5	13	00	David Reutimann	Michael Waltrip Racing	Toyota
6	24	16	Greg Biffle	Roush Fenway Racing	Ford
7	30	29	Kevin Harvick	Richard Childress Racing	Chevrolet
8	9	99	Carl Edwards	Roush Fenway Racing	Ford
9	16	14	Tony Stewart	Stewart Haas Racing	Chevrolet
10	18	20	Joey Logano	Joe Gibbs Racing	Toyota
11	15	24	Jeff Gordon	Hendrick Motorsports	Chevrolet
12	1	56	Martin Truex Jr.	Michael Waltrip Racing	Toyota
13	6	39	Ryan Newman	Stewart Haas Racing	Chevrolet
14	8	43	A. J. Allmendinger	Richard Petty Motorsports	Ford
15	3	5	Mark Martin	Hendrick Motorsports	Chevrolet
16	5	48	Jimmie Johnson	Hendrick Motorsports	Chevrolet
17	7	33	Clint Bowyer	Richard Childress Racing	Chevrolet
18	20	12	Brad Keselowski	Penske Racing	Dodge
19	12	2	Kurt Busch	Penske Racing	Dodge
20	2	9	Kasey Kahne	Richard Petty Motorsports	Ford
21	23	98	Paul Menard	Richard Petty Motorsports	Ford
22	39	83	Casey Mears	Team Red Bull	Toyota
23	29	82	Scott Speed	Team Red Bull	Toyota
24	37	78	Regan Smith	Furniture Row Racing	Chevrolet
25	40	38	David Gilliland	Front Row Motorsports	Ford
26	22	6	David Ragan	Roush Fenway Racing	Ford
27	31	26	David Stremme	Latitude 43 Motorsports	Ford
28	19	19	Elliott Sadler	Richard Petty Motorsports	Ford
29	38	34	Travis Kvapil	Front Row Motorsports	Ford
30	27	88	Dale Earnhardt Jr.	Hendrick Motorsports	Chevrolet
31	42	7	Robby Gordon	Robby Gordon Motorsports	Toyota
32	11	1	Jamie McMurray	Earnhardt Ganassi Racing	Chevrolet
33	41	37	Kevin Conway	Front Row Mototsports	Ford
34	10	77	Sam Hornish Jr.	Penske Racing	Dodge
35	28	42	Juan Pablo Montoya	Earnhardt Ganassi Racing	Chevrolet
36	26	47	Marcos Ambrose	JTG Daugherty Racing	Toyota
37	25	46	J. J. Yeley	Whitney Motorsports	Dodge
38	36	87	Joe Nemechek	NEMCO Motorsports	Toyota
39	33	71	Bobby Labonte	TRG Motorsports	Chevrolet
40	32	09	Mike Bliss	Phoenix Racing	Chevrolet
41	35	66	Dave Blaney	Prism Motorsports	Toyota
42	34	55	Michael McDowell	Prism Motorsports	Toyota
43	43	36	Johnny Sauter	Tommy Baldwin Racing	Chevrolet

Previous race: 2010 Showtime Southern 500	Sprint Cup Series; 2010 season	Next race: 2010 Coca-Cola 600
