= Mike Shiplett =

NASCAR crew chief (born 1972)

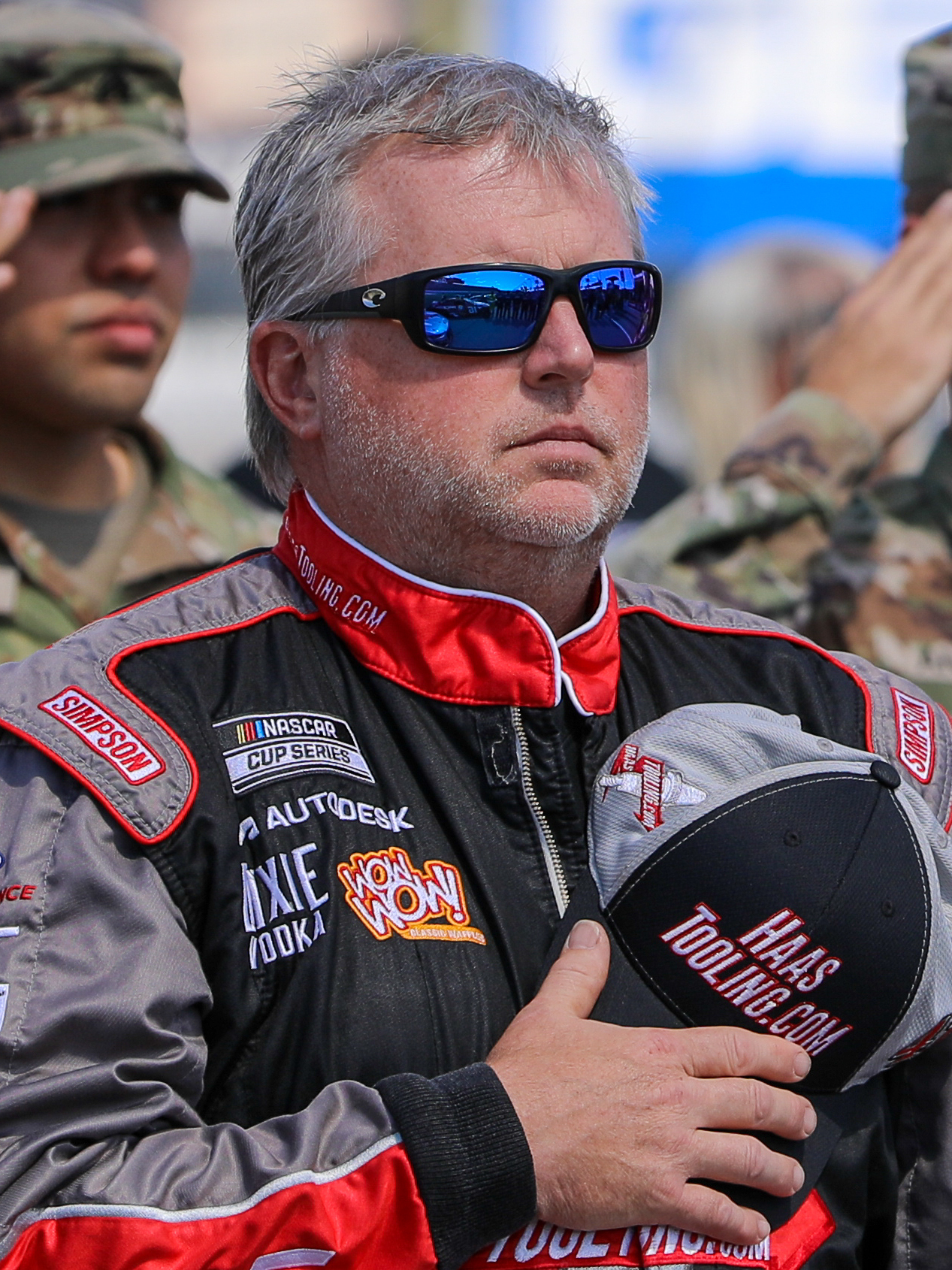
- Shiplett at Kansas Speedway in 2022

Personal information
- Born: Michael Gene Shiplett; May 17, 1972 (age 54) Amherst, Ohio, U.S.
- Education: University of Northwestern Ohio
- Occupation: Crew chief
- Years active: 1995–present

Sport
- Country: United States
- Sport: Motor racing
- League: NASCAR Craftsman Truck Series
- Team: 4. Niece Motorsports

Michael Gene Shiplett (born May 17, 1972) is an American NASCAR crew chief who works for Niece Motorsports as the crew chief of their No. 4 Chevrolet Silverado in the NASCAR Craftsman Truck Series driven by multiple drivers. He previously worked for Richard Childress Racing as their Xfinity Series competition director and as a crew chief for Stewart–Haas Racing, Chip Ganassi Racing, Turner Scott Motorsports, and Evernham/Richard Petty Motorsports.

== Racing career ==
=== Early career ===
Shiplett started his racing career by working in his uncle's racing shop in Ohio, going from working on the street stock cars his uncle owned to being given the opportunity to drive them when he was 15. However, a local rule prohibited him from driving a street stock car until he was 16. He moved up the ladder of racing, from street stocks to late models before going to college and graduating with a degree in diesel technology from the University of Northwestern Ohio in 1992.

Shiplett earned his first job as a mechanic for Liberty Racing in 1995 as they made their transition into the brand-new NASCAR Craftsman Truck Series. He moved to Butch Mock Motorsports in 1999, becoming the car chief for the No. 75 truck. He got another opportunity to be in the same position in 2001 for Ultra Motorsports. He worked for the team again in 2002 on their No. 7 car driven by Casey Atwood.

=== 2003–2008: Evernham Motorsports ===
==== 2003–2006: Mechanic and car chief ====
Shiplett got his first big break in 2003, when he was hired by Evernham Motorsports to serve as the lead mechanic for the team's No. 19 car driven by Jeremy Mayfield. In 2006, he was promoted to be the car chief (which Evernham Motorsports referred to as a "car director") of the No. 9 car driven by Kasey Kahne. Kahne had one of his best seasons with Shiplett and crew chief Kenny Francis in 2006, winning a career-high 6 races en-route to an eighth-place finish in that year's Chase for the Nextel Cup.

==== 2007: Busch Series No. 9 car ====
Due to the success of the 2006 season, Shiplett was rewarded with his first opportunity as crew chief (which Evernham Motorsports referred to as a "team director"). He crew chiefed their No. 9 car in the Busch Series in 2007, driven by multiple drivers. The No. 9 Busch Series team won two races in 2007, with both wins coming from Kasey Kahne.

==== 2008: Cup Series No. 10 car ====
Shiplett was promoted once again in 2008 to be the crew chief for the No. 10 car driven by Patrick Carpentier. Although Carpentier won a pole at New Hampshire, the 2008 season was a disaster for Shiplett and Carpentier, with five DNQs (Did not qualify). Things came to a head at the fall race at Talladega, where Carpentier failed to qualify for the fifth time that season. Shiplett and Carpentier got into a heated argument after Shiplett blamed Carpentier for failing to qualify, which led to Carpentier's firing. Carpentier was replaced by Terry Labonte, Mike Wallace, and A. J. Allmendinger. The No. 10 team finished an abysmal 37th in owners points in 2008.

=== 2009–2011: Richard Petty Motorsports (first stint) ===
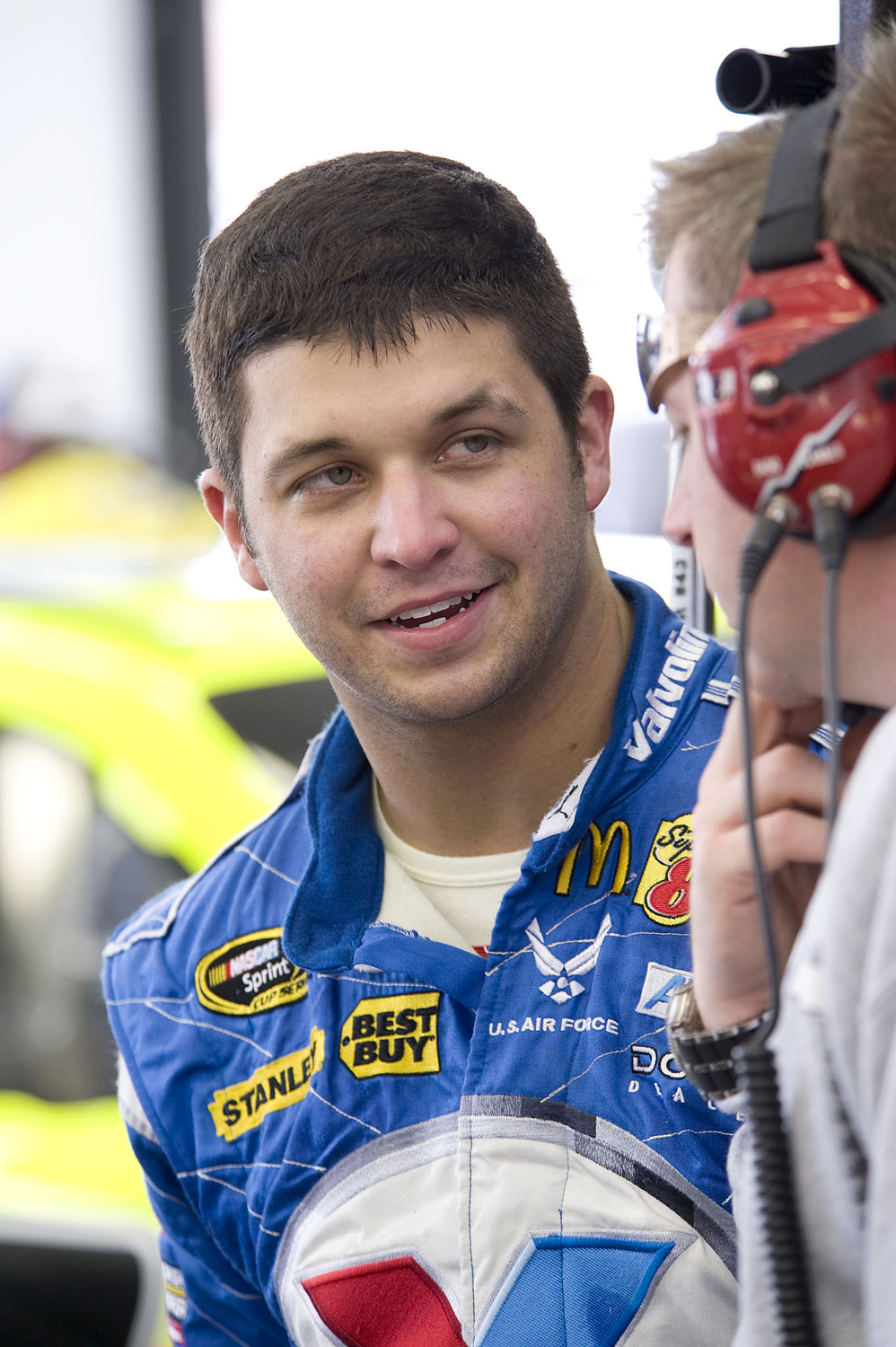
Shiplett in 2009 talking to Reed Sorenson, who he crew chiefed that year

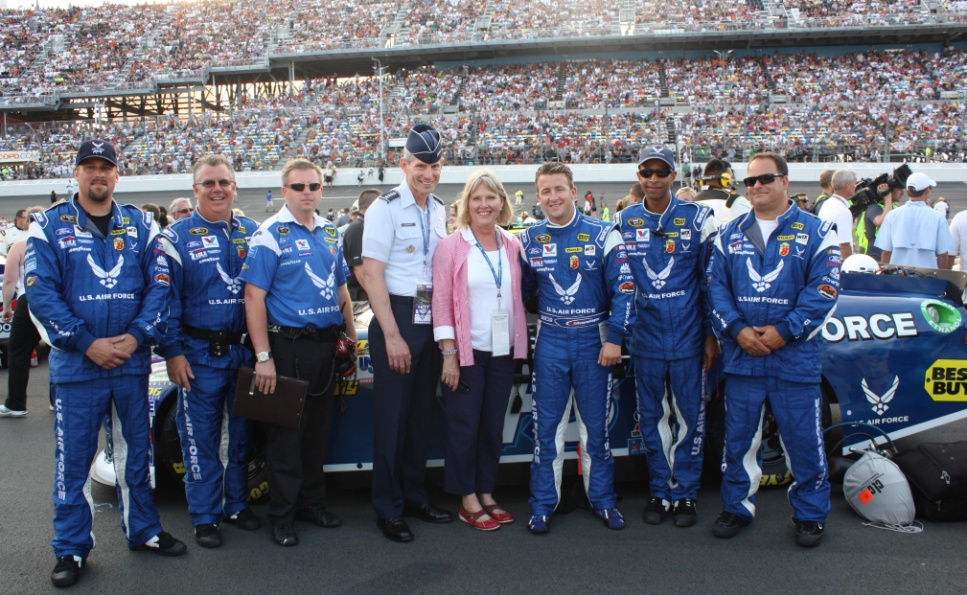
Shiplett (third from left) with his pit crew, his driver A. J. Allmendinger and Chief of Staff of the United States Air Force Norton A. Schwartz and his wife on pit road before the 2011 Coke Zero 400

Despite the poor performance of the No. 10 team during the 2008 season, Shiplett stayed with Gillett Evernham Motorsports as it merged with Petty Enterprises to form Richard Petty Motorsports (RPM). The No. 10 team became the No. 43 team in 2009, with new driver Reed Sorenson behind the wheel. After 22 races, the No. 43 and 44 teams switched at Michigan, with Shiplett becoming the new crew chief for A. J. Allmendinger in the 44 for the final 14 races of the season. Despite the crew swap, Shiplett's teams improved in 2009, with Allmendinger finishing 24th in points and Sorenson finishing 29th.

Because Shiplett had more success with Allmendinger in 2009 than Sorenson, Shiplett stayed with Allmendinger for 2010 as the No. 44 team became the No. 43 team and Richard Petty Motorsports merged with Yates Racing. Allmendinger and Shiplett improved on their brief 2009 season with a points finish of 19th and a pole at Phoenix Raceway.

Shiplett and Allmendinger were retained by Richard Petty Motorsports as they downsized from 4 to 2 teams. After eight years at Richard Petty Motorsports and its predecessors, Shiplett was fired on July 18, 2011 after the New Hampshire race. At the time of his firing, the No. 43 team was in 16th place in the points standings. Shiplett was replaced by Greg Erwin for the rest of the 2011 season.

=== 2012: Turner Motorsports ===
After being fired from Richard Petty Motorsports, Shiplett was hired by Turner Motorsports to be the crew chief of their No. 38 entry driven by longtime Evernham Motorsports/Richard Petty Motorsports driver Kasey Kahne and World of Outlaws driver Brad Sweet for the first 23 races. Shiplett was also a crew chief in the Truck Series for one race at Rockingham Speedway with Kahne, which they won.

=== 2013–2014: Richard Petty Motorsports (second stint) ===
Shiplett returned to Richard Petty Motorsports for the 2013 and 2014 seasons and joined their research and development team along with being the car chief for the No. 9 team driven by Marcos Ambrose. He was the crew chief for one race during the 2013 season for Corey LaJoie's Nationwide Series debut at Homestead-Miami Speedway, where LaJoie finished 34th.

=== 2015–2018: Chip Ganassi Racing ===
Before the 2015 season, Shiplett was given another opportunity to be a crew chief when he was hired by HScott Motorsports with Chip Ganassi to be the crew chief for their No. 42 entry driven by Kyle Larson, Brennan Poole, and Justin Marks. Shiplett's drivers combined earned one win at Homestead–Miami Speedway and finished 15th in the owner's championship.

Shiplett and the entire No. 42 team except for Poole and co-owner Harry Scott returned for the 2016 season, with Marks racing in 17 races and Larson in 16. Shiplett's team improved on their 2015 campaign, finishing seventh in the owner's championship and scoring three wins, two by Larson and one by Marks.

Shiplett and the No. 42 team returned for the 2017 season, adding new development drivers Alex Bowman and Tyler Reddick. During the season under Shiplett, Larson earned three wins early in the season, Reddick earned his first career Xfinity win at Kentucky Speedway, and Bowman earned his first career Xfinity win at Charlotte Motor Speedway. With Marks, Larson, Reddick, and Bowman, Shiplett's team improved to fifth in the owner's championship.

Before the 2018 season, it was announced that Shiplett would return to Chip Ganassi Racing's Xfinity Series team in 2018 with Larson, Marks, and John Hunter Nemechek as drivers for Shiplett's No. 42 team. After the New Hampshire race, Shiplett was suspended for one race and fined $10,000 after failing post-race inspection. Ross Chastain joined the No. 42 team on August 23, 2018 for three races and did extremely well under Shiplett, winning one race, winning a pole, and finishing second in another race. Overall, Shiplett and the No. 42 team earned six wins (four with Larson, one with Chastain, and one with Nemechek) and finished second in the owner's championship. After the season, Chip Ganassi Racing's Xfinity program folded and Shiplett was released from Chip Ganassi Racing after the team's main sponsor, DC Solar, was exposed as a Ponzi scheme and forced to shut down.

=== 2019–2022: Stewart–Haas Racing ===
==== 2019: Xfinity Series No. 00 car ====
On February 1, 2019, it was announced that Shiplett and the former No. 42 team would join Stewart–Haas Racing and their No. 00 Xfinity Series program, working exclusively with driver Cole Custer for the full season. In their first season together, Shiplett and Custer had an extremely successful season, winning seven races. In contention for the championship at Homestead-Miami Speedway, Custer was unable to pass Tyler Reddick in the closing laps and finished second in the race and in the overall points standings.

==== 2020–2022: Cup Series No. 41 car ====
Despite the disappointing end to the 2019 season, Shiplett and Custer were promoted to the No. 41 team in the NASCAR Cup Series for the 2020 season. Custer broke through when he won the 2020 Quaker State 400 at Kentucky Speedway to clinch a playoff berth, giving Custer and Shiplett their first career Cup Series wins as driver and crew chief, respectively. In Shiplett's 150th career start at Bristol, the No. 41 team was eliminated in the first round of the 2020 NASCAR Cup Series Playoffs. Despite the win and playoff berth, the team struggled throughout the season and finished 16th out of 16 playoff drivers in the points standings.

Early in the season after the 2021 Pennzoil 400 at Las Vegas, Shiplett was suspended for 1 race and fined $20,000 for failing post–race inspection.

Shiplett returned as the crew chief of the No. 41 car a third straight year in 2022. He and Custer missed the playoffs again. However, their teammate Chase Briscoe did make the playoffs and during the race at the Charlotte Roval, Custer was in front of Briscoe on the last lap and intentionally slowed down and checked up heading into the "bus stop", which resulted in Briscoe gaining positions and passing cars and advancing to the next round of the playoffs. As a result, NASCAR announced on the Tuesday after the race that Custer would lose 50 driver points, the No. 41 car would lose 50 owner points, and Shiplett would be indefinitely suspended. The team appealed the penalty, which allowed Shiplett to crew chief the car until the appeal date, but on October 27, Stewart–Haas Racing lost the appeal against Custer's penalties.

=== 2023–present: Richard Childress Racing, Bret Holmes Racing and Niece Motorsports ===
On January 10, 2023, NASCAR lifted Shiplett's suspension. After that was announced, later in the same day, Richard Childress Racing announced that Shiplett would join the team in the role of Xfinity Series competition director.

On January 19, 2024, it was announced that Shiplett would be joining Bret Holmes Racing to crew chief their No. 32 truck in the NASCAR Craftsman Truck Series driven by Bret Holmes. On October 25, BHR abruptly announced that they would immediately be shutting down, leaving Shiplett without a job. Almost immediately, he was picked up by Niece Motorsports to crew chief Matt Mills' No. 42 truck to finish the year, with Mills' crew chief Jon Leonard being moved to the team's part-time No. 44 truck.

== Personal life ==
Shiplett was born and raised in Amherst, Ohio although he currently lives in Denver, North Carolina (in the Charlotte metropolitan area where most NASCAR teams are based) with his wife, Brooke.
