= 2010 Gatorade Duels =

Qualifying races for the 2010 Daytona 500

The 2010 Gatorade Duels were two 150 miles (240 km) qualifying races for the 2010 Daytona 500 held on February 11, 2010 at the 2.5 miles (4.0 km) Daytona International Speedway in Daytona Beach, Florida. The races determined the field for the race on Sunday, February 14, 2010. Prior to the Duels, only two drivers had their starting positions locked into the 500, they were pole-sitter Mark Martin and Dale Earnhardt Jr., Bill Elliott, Joe Nemechek, Scott Speed, and Bobby Labonte were the four fastest non-top 35 drivers, thus locked in.

== Race 1 and 2 results ==
Top Ten Finishers
Race 1			Race 2		
Finish	Car No.	Driver	Finish	Car No.	Driver
1	48	Jimmie Johnson	1	9	Kasey Kahne
2	29	Kevin Harvick	2	14	Tony Stewart
3	18	Kyle Busch	3	42	Juan Pablo Montoya
4	33	Clint Bowyer	4	2	Kurt Busch
5	78	Regan Smith	5	19	Elliott Sadler
6	1	Jamie McMurray	6	56	Martin Truex Jr.
7	43	A. J. Allmendinger	7	20	Joey Logano
8	39	Ryan Newman	8	47	Marcos Ambrose
9	6	David Ragan	9	00	David Reutimann
10	24	Jeff Gordon	10	83	Brian Vickers
11	16	Greg Biffle	11	17	Matt Kenseth

=== Made the field ===
Top Ten Finishers
Race 1	Race 2
55-Michael McDowell	36-Mike Bliss
13-Max Papis	82-Scott Speed
	51-Michael Waltrip

== Did not qualify ==
Did not qualify
97-Jeff Fuller	32-Reed Sorenson	46-Terry Cook	27-Todd Bodine	66-Dave Blaney	57-Norm Benning
90-Casey Mears	75-Derrike Cope	09-Aric Almirola	49-David Gilliland	92-Mike Wallace	

== Transfer Spots ==
In each duel, the two highest-finishing drivers not in the top 35 of the previous year's owners points earned a place in the Daytona 500. In the second race, Scott Speed earned a place in addition to being one of the four fastest non top 35 drivers. Therefore, an extra place opened for the fifth fastest qualifier and thus Michael Waltrip was awarded a spot in the race.
