= Greg Zipadelli =

NASCAR crew chief

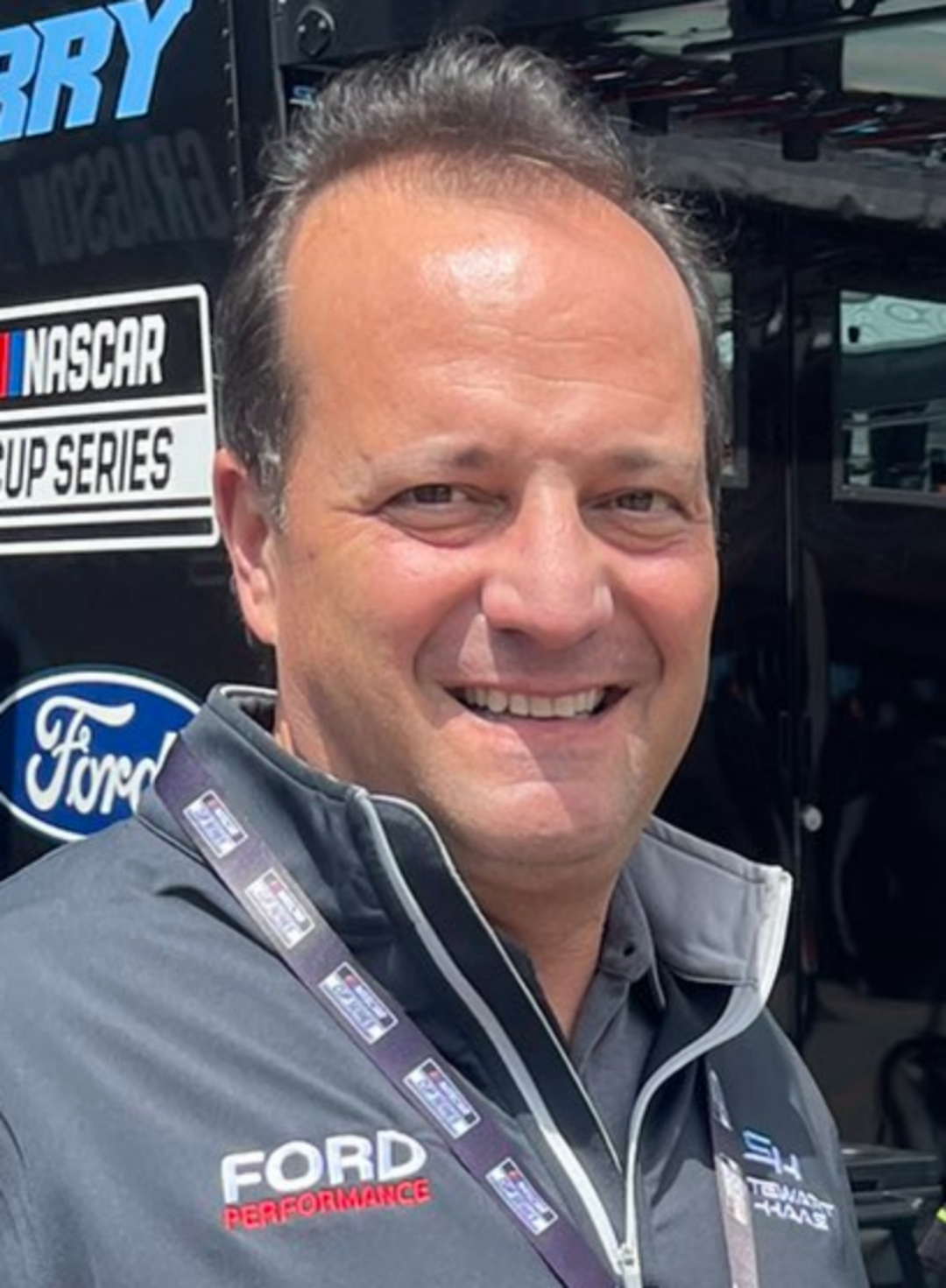
- Zipadelli at Sonoma Raceway in 2024
- Born: Gregory C. Zipadelli; April 21, 1967 (age 58); Berlin, Connecticut, U.S.
- Occupations: Crew chief, Competition Director and VP of Business Operations
- Years active: 1988–present
- Employer: Rette Jones Racing
- Known for: Crew chief of No. 20 Joe Gibbs Racing car in the NASCAR Cup Series (1999–2011) and Competition Director for Stewart–Haas Racing (2012–2024)
- Notable work: 2-time NASCAR Cup Series championship-winning crew chief
- Spouse: Nanette Zipadelli
- Children: 3
- Website: www.gregzipadelli.com

Gregory C. Zipadelli, nicknamed "Zippy", (born April 21, 1967) is an American crew chief and team executive in NASCAR. Since 2025, he has worked for Rette Jones Racing as the team's Vice President of Business Operations. Zipadelli is most notable for being the crew chief of the No. 20 car for Joe Gibbs Racing drivers Tony Stewart and Joey Logano from 1999 to 2011. He won 34 races and two championships as a crew chief and the competition director at Stewart–Haas Racing from 2012 until the team's closure in 2024.

== Racing career ==
Zipadelli began his career in the NASCAR Whelen Modified Tour series, becoming the crew chief for his family's team and immediately winning a championship with driver Mike McLaughlin in 1988, at the age of 21. When McLaughlin advanced to the Busch North Series in 1990, Zipadelli joined him. They won five races during the pair's four-year tenure together and claimed another championship in 1997 as the crew chief for Mike Stefanik.

In 1999, Zipadelli joined Joe Gibbs Racing, partnering with IndyCar Series champion turned NASCAR rookie Tony Stewart. Their accomplishments include the 1999 Rookie of the Year title, winning a rookie-record 3 races, three Chase for the NEXTEL Cup appearances, and two championships in 2002 and 2005. The duo of "Smoke" (Stewart) and "Zippy" (Zipadelli) currently have the 3rd longest crew chief-driver relationship in NASCAR with 356 races behind Jimmie Johnson and Chad Knaus (602 races) and Richard Petty and Dale Inman (905 races). However, that relationship ended as of the 2008 season with Stewart's departure from JGR.

In 2009, Stewart left JGR to become a co-owner of Haas CNC Racing, with the team renamed Stewart–Haas Racing. He would drive the team's new No. 14 Chevrolet. JGR Nationwide driver Joey Logano took over the driving of the No. 20 Toyota, with Zipadelli continuing as crew chief.

In December 2011, Zipadelli moved to Stewart–Haas Racing to reunite with Stewart, but as competition director, not as a crew chief. However, it was later announced that Zipadelli would be a part-time crew chief for SHR for their part-time No. 10 car driven by Danica Patrick that year, starting with her Cup Series debut in the Daytona 500. On October 20, 2013, Zipadelli filled in for Steve Addington on the No. 14 car in the race at Talladega Superspeedway, as Addington's wife was giving birth. Austin Dillon filled in for the injured Tony Stewart as the driver in the race.

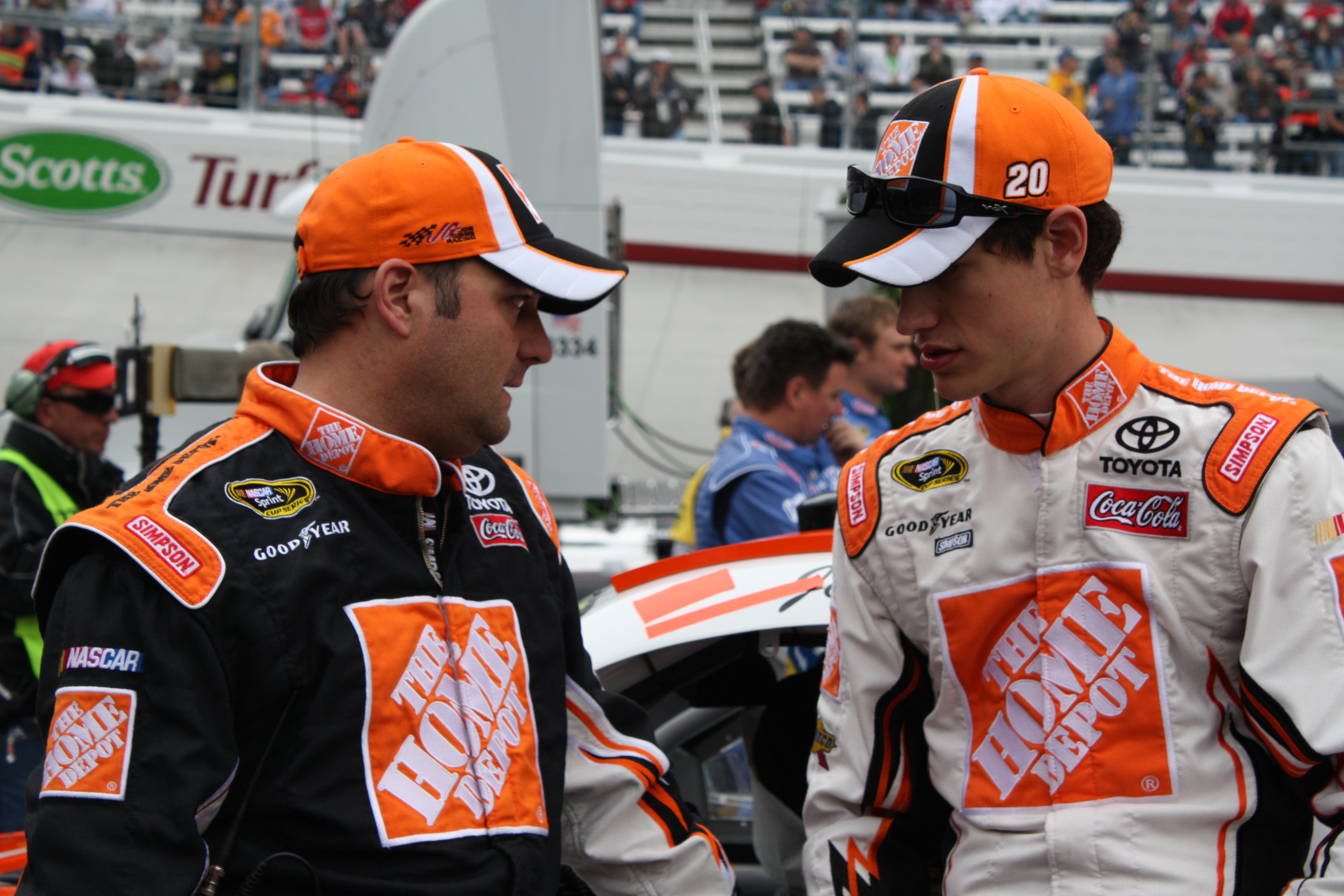
Zipadelli and his driver Joey Logano on pit road before the race at Bristol in March 2010

Zipadelli briefly returned to crew chief on June 14, 2020, in the Xfinity Series when Chase Briscoe’s crew chief, Richard Boswell, was suspended. The race was a success, as Briscoe won, giving Zipadelli his first Xfinity Series win.

SHR closed down after the 2024 season (although co-owner Gene Haas retained ownership of 1 of the team's 4 Cup Series charters and SHR's Xfinity Series operations and continued fielding those entries as a new team, Haas Factory Team) and in February 2025, Zipadelli joined Rette Jones Racing, an ARCA Menards Series, NASCAR Canada Series and late model team, as their Vice President of Business Operations.
