= Keyed-Up Motorsports =

NASCAR team

- Owner: Raymond Key
- Base: Mooresville, North Carolina, United States
- Series: Sprint Cup Series
- Race drivers: Casey Mears, Scott Riggs
- Manufacturer: Chevrolet

Career
- Debut: 2010 Food City 500
- Drivers' Championships: 0

Keyed-Up Motorsports is a former stock car racing team which competed in the NASCAR Sprint Cup Series. Owned by Raymond Key, the team fielded the No. 90 Chevrolet Impala for 2010 but failed to qualify for the 2010 Daytona 500. Casey Mears was the driver for the first six events, their crew chief was Doug Richert and the team purchased their cars from Dale Earnhardt Inc. The team committed to run the first 7 races of 2010 and planned to run the full season if funding was secured. It was briefly an affiliate of the Nationwide Series team, Key Motorsports, owned by Raymond's brother Curtis.

== Car No. 90 History ==
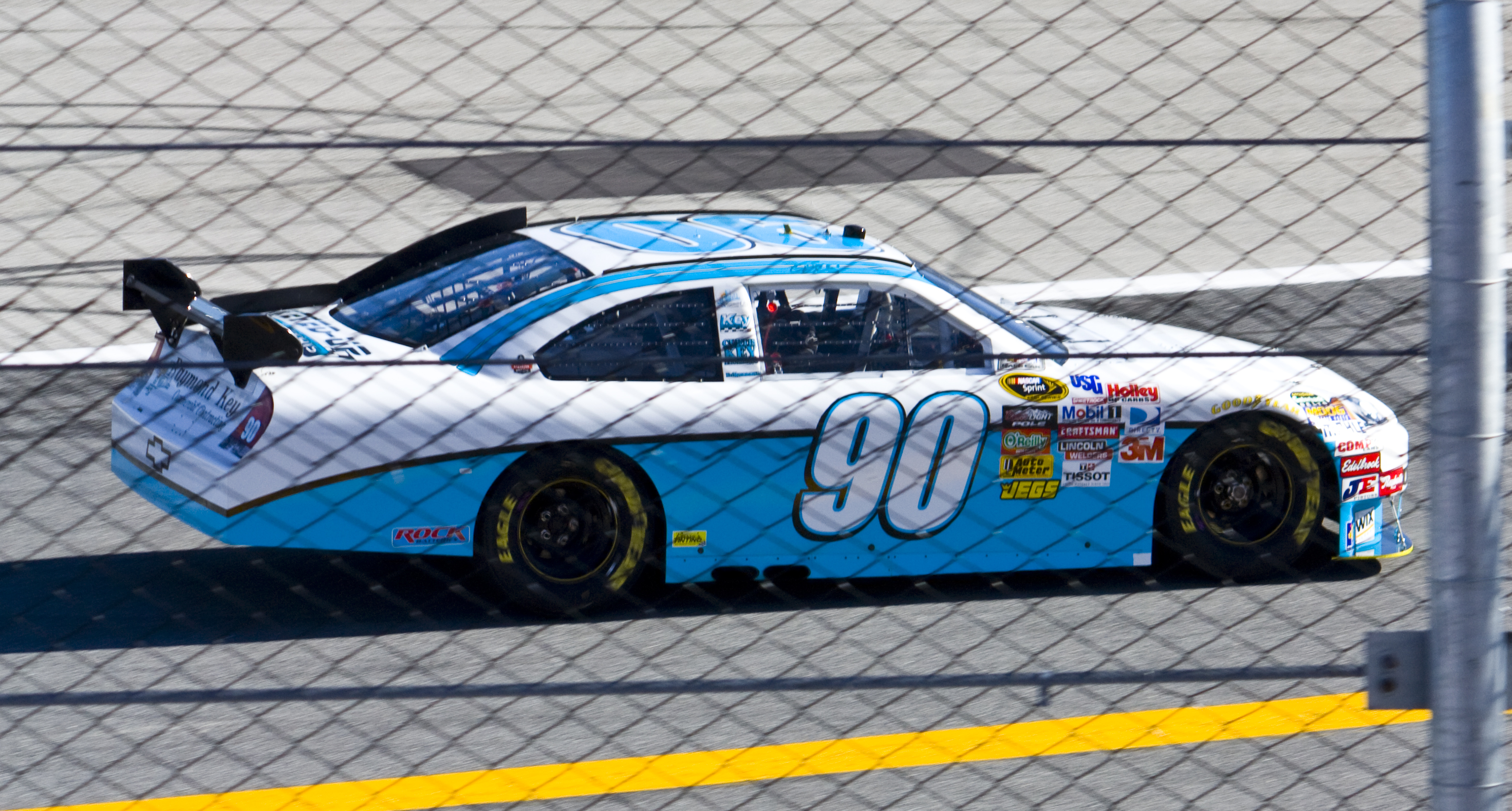
Casey Mears in the No. 90 at Daytona International Speedway in 2010

In late 2009, Raymond Key was granted permission by NASCAR to form a new Sprint Cup Series team for the 2010 season. Keyed-Up selected the number "90" for their first car with the goal of competing in the Daytona 500. Keyed-Up was able to find sponsorship for the new car. As of the Daytona 500 their sponsors included 75000000.com, Wix Filters, Simpson Race Products, and Russo's Tinting. On January 16, 2010, Keyed-Up Motorsports announced that Ergodyne Work Gear would be an associate sponsorship for the entire 2010 season.

Mears's first appearance in the car came in qualifying for the Daytona 500. The team qualified 39th but failed to make the race after the qualifying race. The team failed to make the first four races of the season before finally making the field at Bristol.

Despite the team's qualifying troubles, Mears insisted Keyed-Up Motorsports would run the full race if he made the field and not be a start and park operation. Mears was only signed through the first 5 races, and was free to look elsewhere after that.

After failing to make five of the first six races, Mears finished his commitment with Keyed-Up Motorsports and moved to a temporary role with Joe Gibbs Racing as a standby driver for Denny Hamlin, who was recovering from ACL surgery. They signed Scott Riggs on March 30 and successfully qualified for Phoenix, the second race in seven attempts. Shortly after, Keyed-Up Motorsports announced the team was moving to a part-time schedule for 2010. In May 2010, the team suspended operations until sponsorship could be found rather than resort to funding via start and park. The team announced that it would return in 2011 for a limited schedule with Riggs as the driver and Doug Richert as crew chief. However, Keyed-Up never appeared at Daytona, and Richert moved to Rick Ware Racing while Riggs drove some races for Whitney Motorsports.

=== Car No. 90 results ===
NASCAR Sprint Cup Series results
Year	Driver	No.	Make	1	2	3	4	5	6	7	8	9	10	11	12	13	14	15	16	17	18	19	20	21	22	23	24	25	26	27	28	29	30	31	32	33	34	35	36	Owners	Pts
2010	Casey Mears	90	Chevy	DAY; DNQ	CAL; DNQ	LVS; DNQ	ATL; DNQ	BRI; 30	MAR; DNQ																															48th	304
2010	Scott Riggs	90	Chevy							PHO; 28	TEX	TAL	RCH	DAR	DOV	CLT	POC	MCH	SON	NHA	DAY	CHI	IND	POC	GLN	MCH	BRI	ATL	RCH	NHA	DOV	KAN	CAL	CLT	MAR	TAL	TEX	PHO	HOM	48th	304
