= Latitude 43 Motorsports =

Former NASCAR team

- Owner: Bill Jenkins
- Base: Mooresville, North Carolina
- Series: Sprint Cup Series
- Race drivers: Boris Said; Bill Elliott; David Stremme; Patrick Carpentier; Ken Schrader; J. J. Yeley; Jeff Green
- Manufacturer: Ford
- Opened: 2010
- Closed: 2010

Career
- Debut: 2010 Daytona 500 (Daytona)
- Latest race: 2010 Ford 400 (Homestead)
- Races competed: 27
- Drivers' Championships: 0
- Race victories: 0
- Pole positions: 0

Latitude 43 Motorsports is a disbanded NASCAR team that competed in the Sprint Cup Series in 2010. They last fielded the No. 26 Ford Fusion for Boris Said, Bill Elliott, David Stremme, and Patrick Carpentier. The team was started after Vermont businessman Bill Jenkins purchased the team from Roush Fenway Racing to satisfy NASCAR's limit of four cars per race team. As a result, the owner's points were transferred and the team was guaranteed entry into the first five races of 2010. The team folded at the end of the season, with the equipment and sponsors moving to crew chief Frank Stoddard's Go FAS Racing.

== History ==
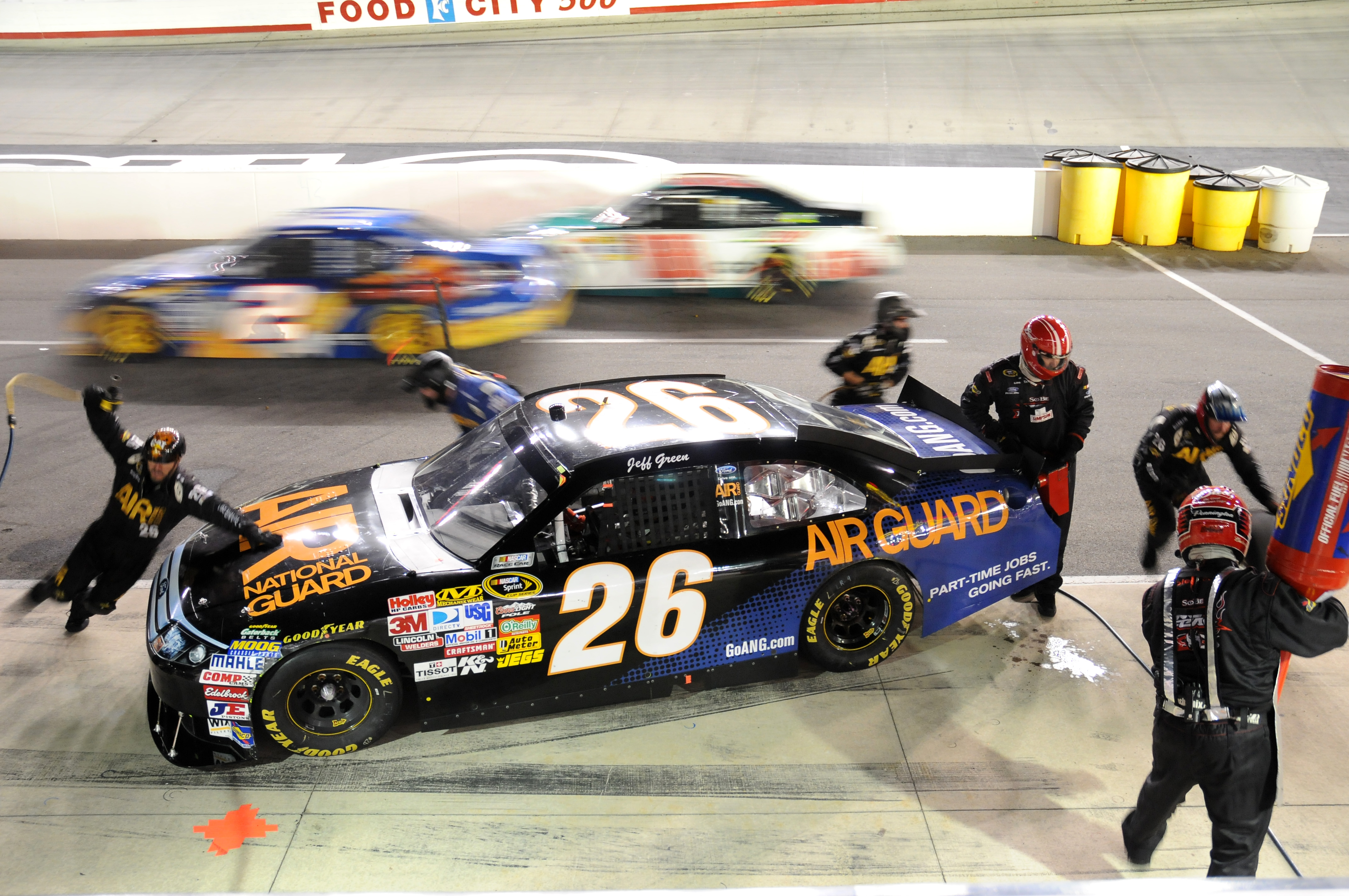
Jeff Green driving the 26 car at the 2010 Irwin Tools Night Race.

After the 2009 season, Roush Racing was forced to cede one of its five Sprint Cup teams to satisfy NASCAR's limit of four. Roush sold the No. 26 team of Jamie McMurray and its owner points to Bill Jenkins.

The No. 26 Ford started off in the 2010 NASCAR Sprint Cup Series with Boris Said as driver in the 2010 Daytona 500 with Window World Cares sponsorship, led one lap, and finished the race in 25th after being involved in a couple of accidents. The team's next race was at Auto Club Speedway a week later. They got sponsorship from Sacred Power, a New Mexico-based renewable energy company owned by Native Americans. They finished 38th.

David Stremme took over for the team at Bristol with Air Guard as a donated sponsor. For the Gillette Fusion ProGlide 500, the team picked up sponsorship from GlobeTrack Wireless. At Sonoma, Said returned, led eight laps and finished eighth. Boris Said left the team because he said Jenkins wasn't being fair with his employees, and ended up in the 83 Red Bull Toyota for one race, wishing Stremme good luck. Patrick Carpentier ran at Watkins Glen and Michigan after Stremme left on similarly unfriendly terms. Carpentier and Jeff Green split the ride for the remainder of the 2010 season. Ken Schrader drove the car at Martinsville, Bill Elliott ran at Talladega, and J. J. Yeley at Phoenix. The team failed to qualify for nine events and finished 37th in owner's points.

The team closed up shop at the end of the 2010 season and sold their equipment to fellow New Englander Frank Stoddard and his new team FAS Lane Racing.

=== Car No. 26 results ===
NASCAR Sprint Cup Series results
Year	Driver	No.	Make	1	2	3	4	5	6	7	8	9	10	11	12	13	14	15	16	17	18	19	20	21	22	23	24	25	26	27	28	29	30	31	32	33	34	35	36	Owners	Pts
2010	Boris Said	26	Ford	DAY; 25	CAL; 38	LVS; 40	ATL; 32												SON; 8																					37th	2329
2010	David Stremme	26	Ford					BRI; 24	MAR; 37	PHO; DNQ	TEX; DNQ	TAL; 27	RCH; 29	DAR; 24	DOV; 27	CLT; DNQ	POC; 24	MCH; 30		NHA; 31	DAY; 37	CHI; 36	IND; DNQ	POC; DNQ																37th	2329
2010	Patrick Carpentier	26	Ford																						GLN; 21	MCH; 29		ATL; 28				KAN; 27	CAL; DNQ	CLT; 37			TEX; 31		HOM; DNQ	37th	2329
2010	Jeff Green	26	Ford																								BRI; 24		RCH; 36	NHA; DNQ	DOV; DNQ									37th	2329
2010	Ken Schrader	26	Ford																																MAR; 18					37th	2329
2010	Bill Elliott	26	Ford																																	TAL; 40				37th	2329
2010	J. J. Yeley	26	Ford																																			PHO; 31		37th	2329
