= 2010 Samsung Mobile 500 =

Race details
- Race 8 of 36 in the 2010 NASCAR Sprint Cup Series
- The 2010 Samsung Mobile 500 program cover, with artwork by former NASCAR artist Sam Bass. The painting is called “Gimme Back My Bullets!”
- Date: April 19, 2010
- Official name: Samsung Mobile 500
- Location: Texas Motor Speedway in Fort Worth, Texas
- Course: Permanent racing facility
- Course length: 1.5 miles (2.4 km)
- Distance: 334 laps, 501 mi (806.3 km)
- Weather: Mostly cloudy, with a high near 65. Northeast wind around 10 mph.
- Average speed: 146.23 miles per hour (235.33 km/h)

Pole position
Driver	Tony Stewart	Stewart Haas Racing
- Time: 28.224

Most laps led
Driver	Jeff Gordon	Hendrick Motorsports
- Laps: 124

Winner
No. 11	Denny Hamlin	Joe Gibbs Racing

Television in the United States
- Network: Fox Broadcasting Company
- Announcers: Mike Joy, Darrell Waltrip and Larry McReynolds

The 2010 Samsung Mobile 500 was the eighth race of the 2010 NASCAR Sprint Cup Series season at Texas Motor Speedway in Fort Worth, Texas. It was scheduled to start at 3:00 p.m. EST on April 18, 2010, but because of poor weather conditions it was delayed until noon EDT on April 19 on Fox, and was broadcast on PRN radio at 2:00 pm EDT. This was the first race on a mile and a half track that cars had the new rear spoilers installed, which altered their aerodynamic features. The race had 12 different leaders, 31 lead changes, seven caution flags and one red flag. Denny Hamlin won the race, and would go on to also win the fall race.

The layout of Texas Motor Speedway, the venue where the event was held.

== Background ==
=== Entry list ===
Car	Driver	Team	Make
00	David Reutimann	Michael Waltrip Racing	Toyota
1	Jamie McMurray	Earnhardt Ganassi Racing	Chevrolet
2	Kurt Busch	Penske Racing	Dodge
5	Mark Martin	Hendrick Motorsports	Chevrolet
6	David Ragan	Roush Fenway Racing	Ford
7	Robby Gordon	Robby Gordon Motorsports	Toyota
9	Kasey Kahne	Richard Petty Motorsports	Ford
09	Mike Bliss	Phoenix Racing	Chevrolet
11	Denny Hamlin	Joe Gibbs Racing	Toyota
12	Brad Keselowski	Penske Racing	Dodge
13	Max Papis	Germain Racing	Toyota
14	Tony Stewart	Stewart–Haas Racing	Chevrolet
16	Greg Biffle	Roush Fenway Racing	Ford
17	Matt Kenseth	Roush Fenway Racing	Ford
18	Kyle Busch	Joe Gibbs Racing	Toyota
19	Elliott Sadler	Richard Petty Motorsports	Ford
20	Joey Logano	Joe Gibbs Racing	Toyota
21	Bill Elliott	Wood Brothers Racing	Ford
24	Jeff Gordon	Hendrick Motorsports	Chevrolet
26	David Stremme	Latitude 43 Motorsports	Ford
29	Kevin Harvick	Richard Childress Racing	Chevrolet
31	Jeff Burton	Richard Childress Racing	Chevrolet
32	Reed Sorenson	Braun Racing	Toyota
33	Clint Bowyer	Richard Childress Racing	Chevrolet
34	Travis Kvapil	Front Row Motorsports	Ford
36	Johnny Sauter	Tommy Baldwin Racing	Chevrolet
37	David Gilliland	Front Row Motorsports	Ford
38	Kevin Conway	Front Row Motorsports	Ford
39	Ryan Newman	Stewart–Haas Racing	Chevrolet
42	Juan Pablo Montoya	Earnhardt Ganassi Racing	Chevrolet
43	A. J. Allmendinger	Richard Petty Motorsports	Ford
46	Terry Cook	Whitney Motorsports	Dodge
47	Marcos Ambrose	JTG Daugherty Racing	Toyota
48	Jimmie Johnson	Hendrick Motorsports	Chevrolet
55	Dave Blaney	Prism Motorsports	Toyota
56	Martin Truex Jr.	Michael Waltrip Racing	Toyota
66	Michael McDowell	Prism Motorsports	Toyota
71	Bobby Labonte	TRG Motorsports	Chevrolet
77	Sam Hornish Jr.	Penske Racing	Dodge
78	Regan Smith	Furniture Row Racing	Chevrolet
82	Scott Speed	Red Bull Racing Team	Toyota
83	Brian Vickers	Red Bull Racing Team	Toyota
87	Joe Nemechek	NEMCO Motorsports	Toyota
88	Dale Earnhardt Jr.	Hendrick Motorsports	Chevrolet
98	Paul Menard	Richard Petty Motorsports	Ford
99	Carl Edwards	Roush Fenway Racing	Ford

== Race report ==
=== Practices and qualifying ===
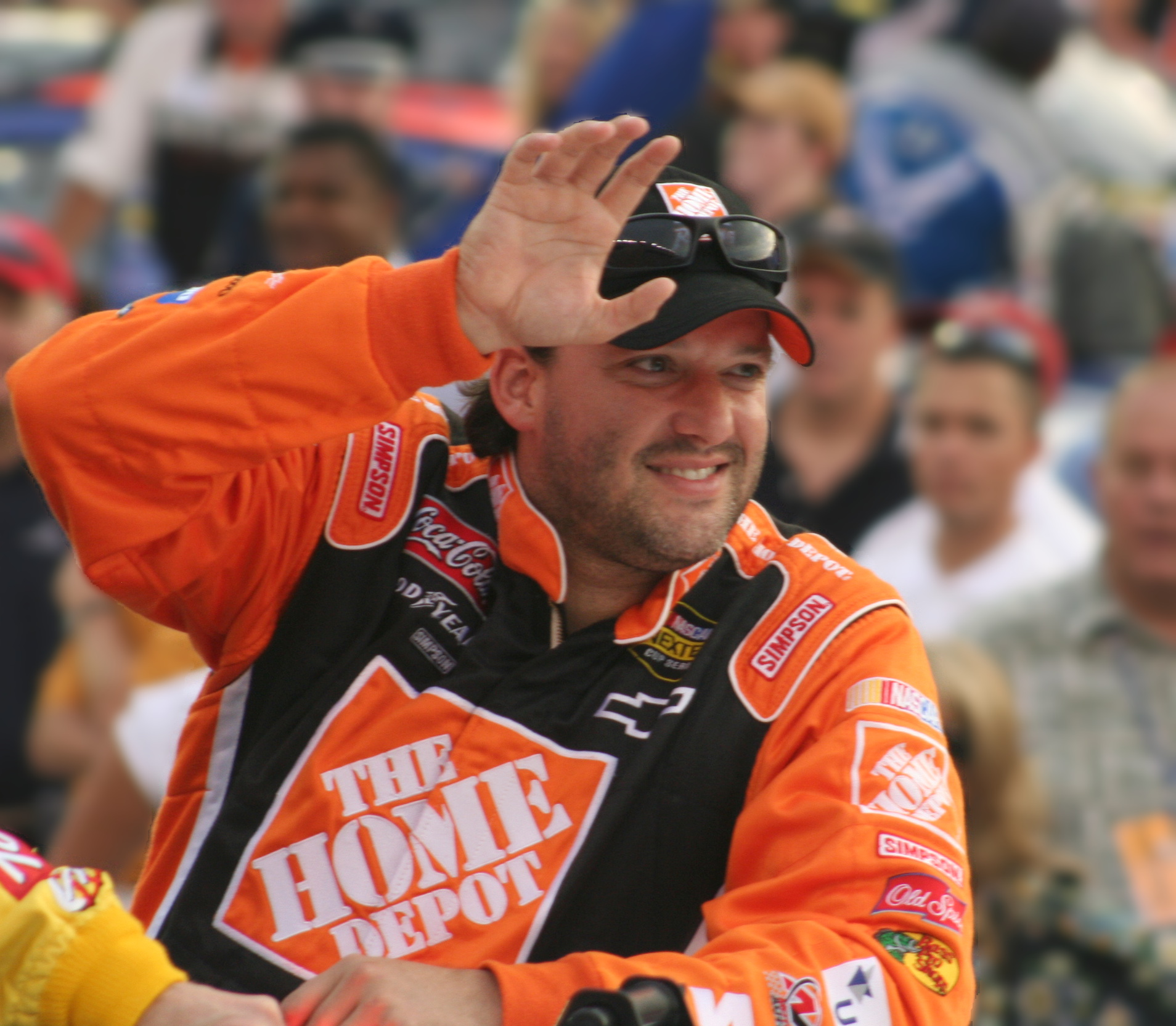
Pole-sitter Tony Stewart in 2007.

During the first practice on April 16 the fastest drivers were Greg Biffle, Juan Pablo Montoya, David Reutimann, David Gilliland, and Bobby Labonte. In qualifying, the top-five fastest were Tony Stewart, Sam Hornish Jr., Greg Biffle, Jimmie Johnson, and Kasey Kahne, while David Stremme, Terry Cook, and Johnny Sauter did not qualify. On April 17, both scheduled practices were canceled because of rain showers in the area.

Pos.	No.	Driver	Team	Make	Time	Avg. Speed
1	14	Tony Stewart	Stewart–Haas Racing	Chevrolet	28.224	191.327
2	77	Sam Hornish Jr.	Penske Racing	Dodge	28.238	191.232
3	16	Greg Biffle	Roush Fenway Racing	Ford	28.287	190.900
4	48	Jimmie Johnson	Hendrick Motorsports	Chevrolet	28.290	190.880
5	9	Kasey Kahne	Richard Petty Motorsports	Ford	28.315	190.712
6	31	Jeff Burton	Richard Childress Racing	Chevrolet	28.383	190.255
7	18	Kyle Busch	Joe Gibbs Racing	Toyota	28.384	190.248
8	33	Clint Bowyer	Richard Childress Racing	Chevrolet	28.393	190.188
9	88	Dale Earnhardt Jr.	Hendrick Motorsports	Chevrolet	28.403	190.121
10	39	Ryan Newman	Stewart–Haas Racing	Chevrolet	28.421	190.000
11	2	Kurt Busch	Penske Racing	Dodge	28.436	189.900
12	24	Jeff Gordon	Hendrick Motorsports	Chevrolet	28.446	189.833
13	6	David Ragan	Roush Fenway Racing	Ford	28.458	189.753
14	56	Martin Truex Jr.	Michael Waltrip Racing	Toyota	28.465	189.707
15	1	Jamie McMurray	Earnhardt Ganassi Racing	Chevrolet	28.503	189.454
16	00	David Reutimann	Michael Waltrip Racing	Toyota	28.514	189.381
17	43	A. J. Allmendinger	Richard Petty Motorsports	Ford	28.567	189.029
18	20	Joey Logano	Joe Gibbs Racing	Toyota	28.585	188.910
19	29	Kevin Harvick	Richard Childress Racing	Chevrolet	28.591	188.871
20	99	Carl Edwards	Roush Fenway Racing	Ford	28.592	188.864
21	42	Juan Pablo Montoya	Earnhardt Ganassi Racing	Chevrolet	28.600	188.811
22	87	Joe Nemechek	NEMCO Motorsports	Toyota	28.605	188.778
23	82	Scott Speed	Red Bull Racing Team	Toyota	28.606	188.772
24	55	Dave Blaney	Prism Motorsports	Toyota	28.610	188.745
25	98	Paul Menard	Richard Petty Motorsports	Ford	28.617	188.699
26	78	Regan Smith	Furniture Row Racing	Chevrolet	28.618	188.692
27	13	Max Papis	Germain Racing	Toyota	28.626	188.640
28	17	Matt Kenseth	Roush Fenway Racing	Ford	28.627	188.633
29	11	Denny Hamlin	Joe Gibbs Racing	Toyota	28.637	188.567
30	5	Mark Martin	Hendrick Motorsports	Chevrolet	28.675	188.317
31	37	David Gilliland	Front Row Motorsports	Ford	28.709	188.094
32	47	Marcos Ambrose	JTG Daugherty Racing	Toyota	28.710	188.088
33	66	Michael McDowell	Prism Motorsports	Toyota	28.724	187.996
34	09	Mike Bliss	Phoenix Racing	Chevrolet	28.732	187.944
35	34	Travis Kvapil	Front Row Motorsports	Ford	28.745	187.859
36	21	Bill Elliott	Wood Brothers Racing	Ford	28.748	187.839
37	12	Brad Keselowski	Penske Racing	Dodge	28.750	187.826
38	7	Robby Gordon	Robby Gordon Motorsports	Toyota	28.773	187.676
39	19	Elliott Sadler	Richard Petty Motorsports	Ford	28.851	187.169
40	38	Kevin Conway	Front Row Motorsports	Ford	28.911	186.780
41	71	Bobby Labonte	TRG Motorsports	Chevrolet	28.932	186.645
42	83	Brian Vickers	Red Bull Racing Team	Toyota	29.131	185.370
43	32	Reed Sorenson	Braun Racing	Toyota	28.866	187.071
Failed to qualify
44	26	David Stremme	Latitude 43 Motorsports	Ford	28.946	186.554
45	46	Terry Cook	Whitney Motorsports	Dodge	29.029	186.021
46	36	Johnny Sauter	Tommy Baldwin Racing	Chevrolet	29.672	181.990
WD	90	Scott Riggs	Keyed-Up Motorsports		0.000	0.000

=== Race summary ===
The race was scheduled to start on Sunday, April 18, 2010, but rain delayed the event until noon EDT on Monday, April 19. At 12:01 EDT, pre race events began with Dr. Roger Marsh from TXARM-Texas Alliance Raceway Ministries giving the invocation; then Country legend Charley Pride performed the national anthem. Tammy King, who was a contest winner, gave the command: "Gentlemen, Start Your Engines!" Also, because of the rain delay, NASCAR decided to schedule a competition caution on lap 25.

The race began at 12:19 p.m. EDT with Tony Stewart the leader in pole position. Stewart led until lap 16 when he was passed by Greg Biffle. By lap 20 Stewart had fallen to third. Five laps later, the competition caution came out. Tony Stewart was first off pit road and had the lead. The green flag waved on lap 32 while Stewart was still the leader. Stewart led until lap 48 when Jimmie Johnson passed him. Johnson led the race until lap 76 at which point Dale Earnhardt Jr. passed him. One lap later, the second caution, caused by Brian Vickers colliding with the wall, came out. On the restart, Stewart led them to the green flag start on lap 83. The race stayed green until the third caution came out on lap 100. The caution was caused by the spin of Brian Vickers' car in turn three. After all cars had pitted, Earnhardt Jr. became the leader on the lap 104 restart. Shortly after the restart, on lap 111, the fourth caution waved because Sam Hornish Jr. spun in turn four. The restart was on lap 116 with Earnhardt Jr. the leader, but a lap later, on lap 117, Jamie McMurray passed him for the lead.

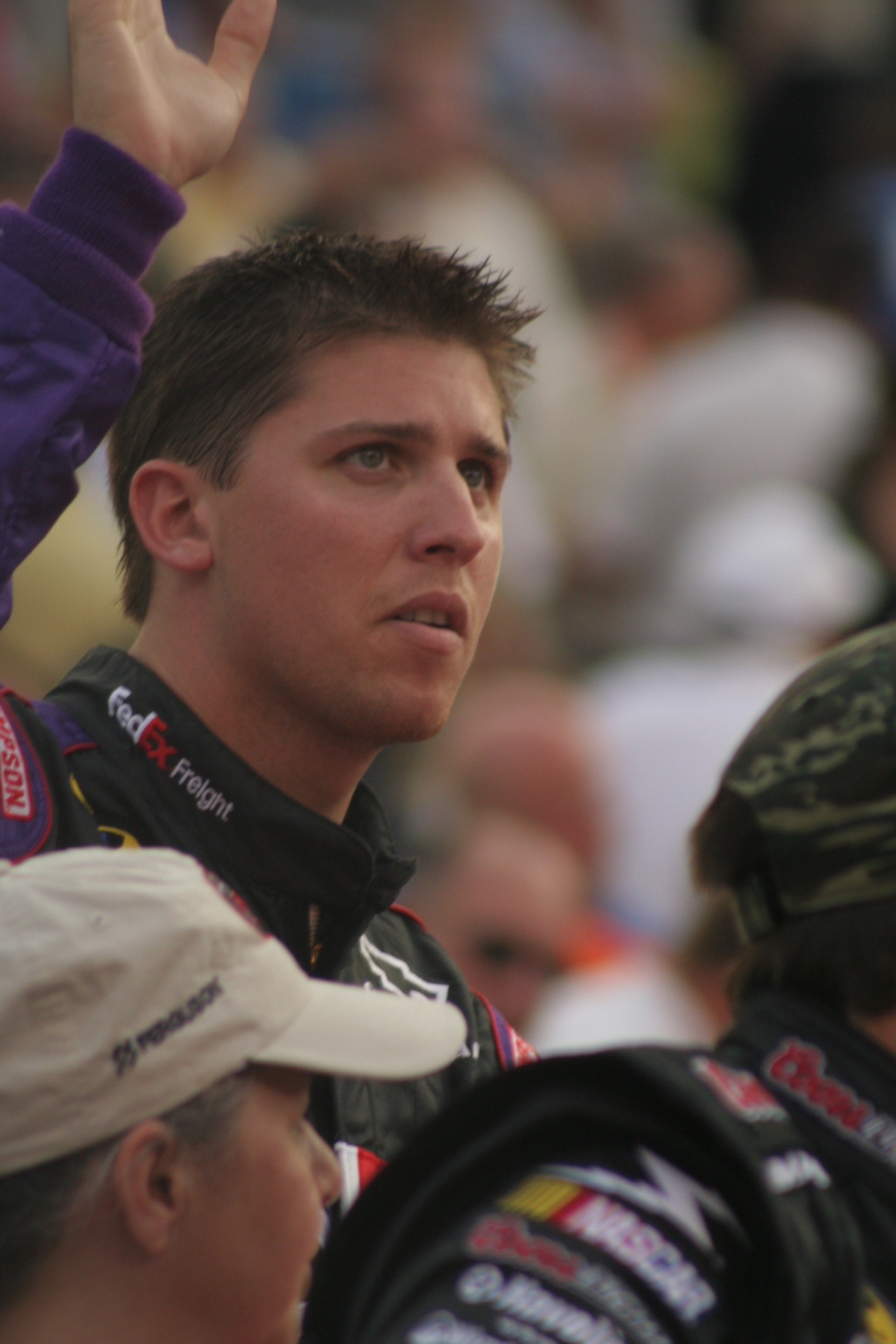
Race winner Denny Hamlin in 2007.

Subsequently, McMurray was in front until lap 127 when Earnhardt Jr. passed him. Earnhardt Jr. led until lap 137 at which point Jeff Gordon passed him. The race experienced a long run from lap 116 to lap 235. Gordon led until lap 166 when he came to pit road for a green flag pit stop; Juan Pablo Montoya passed him. Montoya then pitted leaving the lead for Earnhardt Jr. Gordon passed Earnhardt Jr. on lap 182 for the lead in turn two. Jeff Gordon, around lap 205, entered heavy traffic that slowed him down and caused him to be passed by Jimmie Johnson. Once out of the heavy traffic Gordon took away the lead from Johnson. For the next ten laps green flag pit stops occurred. The top-five after the pit stops was Jimmie Johnson, Jeff Gordon, Dale Earnhardt Jr., Denny Hamlin, and David Reutimann. Then, on lap 227, Gordon passed Johnson for the lead. The fifth caution came out on lap 232 because Montoya collided with the wall. All lead lap cars pitted; the leader on the lap 236 restart was Tony Stewart.

Stewart led until lap 253 because Jeff Gordon passed him. From lap 271 to 291 the race had green flag pit stops; after they were finished Gordon was the leader. Seventeen laps later, on lap 310 the sixth caution came out because of engine problems with David Reutimann's car. On restart, on lap 316, Jeff Burton led them to the green flag. A lap afterwards, the race was red flagged for a large crash exiting the quad-oval. The accident was caused by Tony Stewart getting clipped by Carl Edwards as a group of cars tried to go four-wide. The cars involved were Carl Edwards, Tony Stewart, Jeff Gordon, A. J. Allmendinger, Jamie McMurray, Joey Logano, Juan Pablo Montoya, Paul Menard, and Clint Bowyer. The race was red-flagged for 19 minutes to allow for cleanup to proceed. The restart with Jeff Burton the leader happened on lap 322. On lap 323, Denny Hamlin passed Burton for the lead. On lap 333, the white flag was waved for Hamlin. Jimmie Johnson, who started sixth on the last restart, was catching Hamlin, but Johnson did not have enough time. The race was Hamlin's second win of the season, and his tenth of his career.

== Race results ==
Pos	Car	Driver	Team	Make
1	11	Denny Hamlin	Joe Gibbs Racing	Toyota
2	48	Jimmie Johnson	Hendrick Motorsports	Chevrolet
3	18	Kyle Busch	Joe Gibbs Racing	Toyota
4	2	Kurt Busch	Penske Racing	Dodge
5	9	Kasey Kahne	Richard Petty Motorsports	Ford
6	5	Mark Martin	Hendrick Motorsports	Chevrolet
7	29	Kevin Harvick	Richard Childress Racing	Chevrolet
8	88	Dale Earnhardt Jr.	Hendrick Motorsports	Chevrolet
9	56	Martin Truex Jr.	Michael Waltrip Racing	Toyota
10	16	Greg Biffle	Roush Fenway Racing	Ford
11	39	Ryan Newman	Stewart–Haas Racing	Chevrolet
12	31	Jeff Burton	Richard Childress Racing	Chevrolet
13	43	A. J. Allmendinger	Richard Petty Motorsports	Ford
14	12	Brad Keselowski	Penske Racing	Dodge
15	6	David Ragan	Roush Fenway Racing	Ford
16	82	Scott Speed	Red Bull Racing Team	Toyota
17	47	Marcos Ambrose	JTG Daugherty Racing	Toyota
18	19	Elliott Sadler	Richard Petty Motorsports	Ford
19	77	Sam Hornish Jr.	Penske Racing	Dodge
20	17	Matt Kenseth	Roush Fenway Racing	Ford
21	78	Regan Smith	Furniture Row Racing	Chevrolet
22	13	Max Papis	Germain Racing	Toyota
23	71	Bobby Labonte	TRG Motorsports	Chevrolet
24	34	Travis Kvapil	Front Row Motorsports	Ford
25	21	Bill Elliott	Wood Brothers Racing	Ford
26	7	Robby Gordon	Robby Gordon Motorsports	Toyota
27	38	Kevin Conway	Front Row Motorsports	Ford
28	20	Joey Logano	Joe Gibbs Racing	Toyota
29	37	David Gilliland	Front Row Motorsports	Ford
30	1	Jamie McMurray	Earnhardt Ganassi Racing	Chevrolet
31	24	Jeff Gordon	Hendrick Motorsports	Chevrolet
32	14	Tony Stewart	Stewart–Haas Racing	Chevrolet
33	99	Carl Edwards	Roush Fenway Racing	Ford
34	42	Juan Pablo Montoya	Earnhardt Ganassi Racing	Chevrolet
35	98	Paul Menard	Richard Petty Motorsports	Ford
36	33	Clint Bowyer	Richard Childress Racing	Chevrolet
37	00	David Reutimann	Michael Waltrip Racing	Toyota
38	83	Brian Vickers	Red Bull Racing Team	Toyota
39	32	Reed Sorenson	Braun Racing	Toyota
40	87	Joe Nemechek	NEMCO Motorsports	Toyota
41	66	Michael McDowell	Prism Motorsports	Toyota
42	09	Mike Bliss	Phoenix Racing	Chevrolet
43	55	Dave Blaney	Prism Motorsports	Toyota

Previous race: 2010 Subway Fresh Fit 600	Sprint Cup Series; 2010 season	Next race: 2010 Aaron's 499
