= 2010 Auto Club 500 =

2nd race of the 2010 NASCAR Sprint Cup Series

Race details
- Race 2 of 36 in the 2010 NASCAR Sprint Cup Series
- Track map of the speedway at Auto Club Speedway AKA California Speedway
- Date: February 21, 2010
- Official name: Auto Club 500
- Location: Auto Club Speedway, Fontana, California
- Course: Permanent racing facility
- Course length: 2.0 miles (3.23 km)
- Distance: 250 laps, 500 mi (804.672 km)
- Weather: Sunny with a daytime high around 62; wind out of the ENE at 3 mph. There was a zero percent chance of precipitation.
- Average speed: 141.911 miles per hour (228.384 km/h)

Pole position
Driver	Jamie McMurray	Earnhardt Ganassi Racing
- Time: 39.185

Most laps led
Driver	Jimmie Johnson	Hendrick Motorsports
- Laps: 101

Winner
No. 48	Jimmie Johnson	Hendrick Motorsports

Television in the United States
- Network: Fox Broadcasting Company
- Announcers: Mike Joy, Darrell Waltrip and Larry McReynolds

The 2010 Auto Club 500 was a NASCAR Sprint Cup Series race held on February 21, 2010, at Auto Club Speedway in Fontana, California. Contested over 250 laps, it was the second race of the 2010 Sprint Cup Series season. The race was won by Jimmie Johnson for Hendrick Motorsports. Kevin Harvick finished second and Jeff Burton clinched third.

Polesitter driver Jamie McMurray maintained his lead into the first corner, but outsider Juan Pablo Montoya took the lead before the first lap was over. Afterward, Johnson became the leader, and would eventually lead to the race-high of 101 laps. During the final pit stops, Johnson was on pit lane as the caution flag came out. Burton, who led the race during Johnson's pit stop, did not pass Johnson to put him a lap down. Therefore, Johnson retained the first position upon the completion of pit stops. On the final lap, Harvick was gaining on Johnson, but Johnson maintained his position to win his first race of the season.

There were six caution flags and 28 lead changes among 14 different drivers throughout the course of the race. The result moved Johnson up 23 spots to tenth in the Drivers' Championship, 78 points behind of leader Kevin Harvick and one ahead of Kyle Busch. Chevrolet maintained its lead in the Manufacturers' Championship, eight points ahead of Toyota and nine ahead of Ford, with 34 races remaining in the season.

== Report ==
=== Background ===
Auto Club Speedway (previously California Speedway) was a superspeedway located in Fontana, California which hosted NASCAR racing annually from 1997 to 2023. The standard track at Auto Club Speedway featured four turns and was 2 miles (3.2 km) long. The track's turns were banked at fourteen degrees, while the front stretch, the location of the finish line, was banked at eleven degrees. The back stretch had 3 degrees of banking.

Before the race, Jamie McMurray led the Drivers' Championship with 190 points, and Dale Earnhardt Jr. stood in second with 175 points. Greg Biffle was third in the Drivers' Championship with 170 points, Clint Bowyer was fourth with 165 points, and Kevin Harvick was in fifth with 156 points. In the Manufacturers' Championship, Chevrolet was leading with nine points, three points ahead of their rival Ford. Toyota, with four points, was one point ahead of Dodge in the battle for third.

=== Practices and qualifying ===
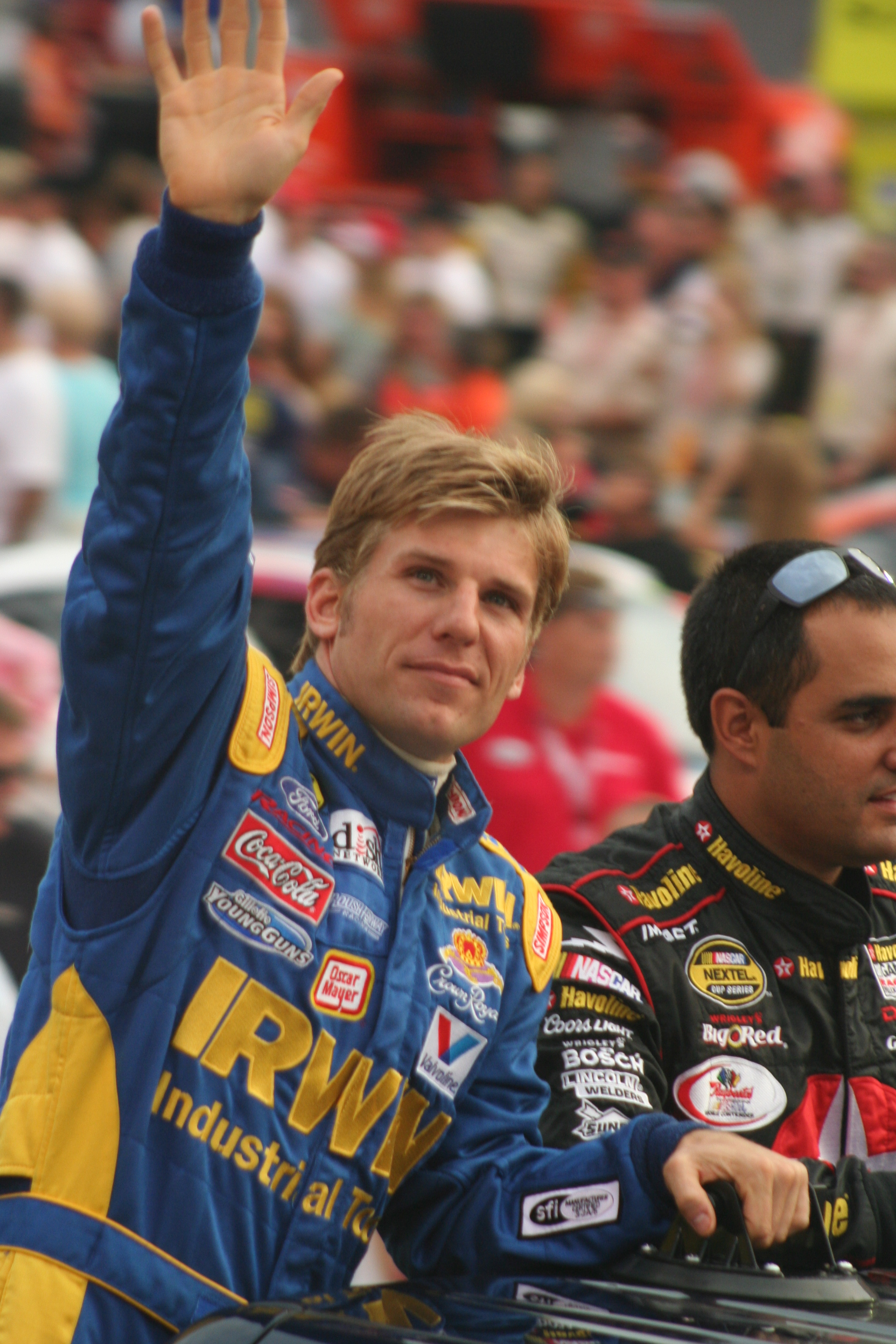
Jamie McMurray, pictured here in 2007, clinched the pole position with a fastest time of 39.185.

Three practice sessions were held before the Sunday race—one on Friday, and two on Saturday. In the first practice session, the fastest drivers were Mark Martin, Ryan Newman, Juan Pablo Montoya, Jeff Burton, and Clint Bowyer. During the second practice session, Jimmie Johnson, Martin, Denny Hamlin, Carl Edwards, and Greg Biffle had the quickest times. Martin, Bowyer, Johnson, McMurray, and Jeff Gordon led the final practice session.

During qualifying, forty-six cars were entered, but only forty-three were able to race because of NASCAR's qualifying procedure. Jamie McMurray clinched the pole position with a best lap time of 39.185 seconds. He was joined on the front row of the grid by Montoya. Bowyer qualified third, Kasey Kahne took fourth, and Dave Blaney started fifth. Casey Mears, Johnny Sauter, and Terry Cook were the three drivers who failed to qualify.

=== Race summary ===
The race, the second out of a total of thirty-six in the season, began at 3 p.m. EST and was televised live in the United States on Fox. Pre-race ceremonies began with Motor Racing Outreach's Jeff Hamilton giving the invocation; then Katharine McPhee, season five American Idol runner-up turned RCA Records recording artist, performed the national anthem. Actor Andy García gave the traditional command, "Gentlemen Start Your Engines!" Before the race, Denny Hamlin moved to the back of the starting grid because his team changed engines after his qualifying run. At 3:19 p.m. EST, polesitter Jamie McMurray led the 43-car field to the green flag, but his lead was short-lived. Juan Pablo Montoya passed him during the first lap to lead lap 1. On lap 29, Jimmie Johnson passed Montoya for the lead. Between laps 35 to 40 teams made green flag pit stops (a pit stop while high speed racing continues). Dave Blaney stayed out to lead before parking his car on lap 44, allowing Johnson to regain the lead.

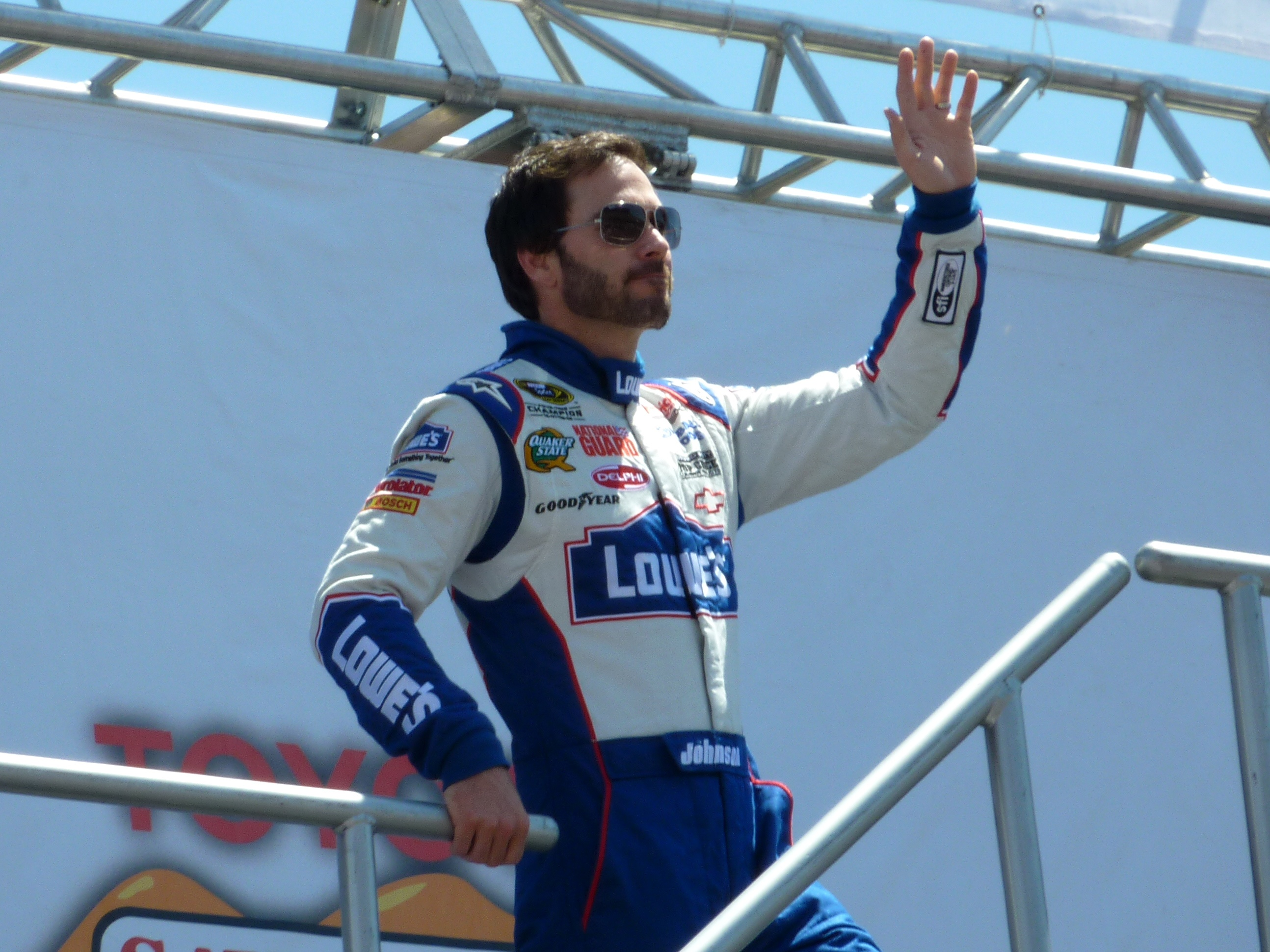
Jimmie Johnson, pictured here in 2010, won the race.

On lap 57, the first caution period of the race was called because of debris on the track's surface. The restart on lap 61 was led by Johnson, but Kevin Harvick passed him for the lead before the lap was over. The second caution flag was waved on lap 92 because Kasey Kahne collided with Montoya. On lap 97, Johnson brought the field to the green flag. Mark Martin passed Johnson on lap 98, but was passed back after two laps. Drivers began heading for pit stops on lap 133. Then, on lap 140, the third caution came out because Montoya's engine failed, causing him to collide with the turn one wall. On lap 145, the green flag waved with Jeff Gordon as the leader.

The fourth caution, caused by the expired engine of Ryan Newman, came out on lap 147. On the restart, Gordon led the field to the green flag. He did not restart fast enough and was passed by both Jeff Burton and Kyle Busch on lap 154. On the next lap, Kyle Busch passed Burton for the lead. Ten laps after that, Burton returned the favor by passing Busch for the lead. During the following laps, several drivers made pit stops. The fifth caution flag was waved on lap 192 because light rain was moving through the area; the leader at the time was Denny Hamlin.

During the restart on lap 199, Burton brought the field to the green flag. No cautions were called until Brad Keselowski collided with the outside wall in turn four that brought out the sixth caution. The restart was on lap 229 with Jimmie Johnson as the leader. In the ensuing laps, Jimmie Johnson increased his lead over second-placed Kevin Harvick, but with fewer than ten laps to go Harvick began gaining on Johnson. Two laps before the finish, Burton caught up to Harvick and Johnson. Johnson held off both Harvick and Burton to win his first race in 2010.

=== Post-race ===
"They're really good, but they're really, really lucky, too. Jimmie is a good friend of mine, but there's no denying how lucky they are. They have a golden horseshoe stuck up their ass."

— Kevin Harvick, speaking after the race.

Jimmie Johnson appeared in victory lane after his victory lap to start celebrating his first win of the season, his fifth at Auto Club Speedway, and his 48th overall in the NASCAR Sprint Cup Series. Following his win, he added, "No way around it, we got lucky. We were able to just beat the 31 car [leader Jeff Burton] to the scoring line by about half a car length or we would have been a lap down."

Although Burton was leading near the end of the race, the caution was issued as Johnson was exiting the pit lane. It gave Burton a chance to put Johnson a lap down, but Johnson entered the track ahead of Burton. In the subsequent press conference, Johnson said, "Fortunate came our way. I’m not going to lie. The fact that we were on pit row gave us track position, and I drove my butt off." Johnson expressed his enjoyment of winning the race, stating:

"Today was a great race for NASCAR and a great race for this track. I know it got spread out some, but there [was] some really good racing from what I saw. Yes, today we got a huge gift. But I was running fourth or fifth at the time [of the last caution], so it's not like we totally backed into this thing. And I still had to hold Kevin off."

Burton, who finished third, stated, "We weren't slowing each other down. I ran the low line and Kevin ran the high line. But I got looser and Kevin got better at the end. The 29 by far had the best car." Harvick, who finished second, said, "When he moved up I got tight and caught the wall a little bit. If he doesn't move up, he gets passed pretty easily. He did what he's supposed to do to take the line away. He did exactly what he had to do." The race result left Harvick leading the Driver's Championship with a total of 331 points. Clint Bowyer, who finished third, was second with 312 points, eight ahead of Greg Biffle and ten ahead of Jamie McMurray. Jeff Burton stood in fifth with 300 points. In the Manufacturers' Championship, Chevrolet maintained their lead with 18 points. Toyota moved to second with 10 points. Ford followed with 9 points, two points ahead of Dodge in fourth.

== Race results ==
=== Qualifying ===
No	Driver	Constructor	Manufacturer	Time (in seconds)	Grid
1	Jamie McMurray	Earnhardt Ganassi Racing	Chevrolet	39.185	1
42	Juan Pablo Montoya	Earnhardt Ganassi Racing	Chevrolet	39.242	2
33	Clint Bowyer	Richard Childress Racing	Chevrolet	39.317	3
9	Kasey Kahne	Richard Petty Motorsports	Ford	39.363	4
66	Dave Blaney	Prism Motorsports	Toyota	39.364	5
29	Kevin Harvick	Richard Childress Racing	Chevrolet	39.366	6
48	Jimmie Johnson	Hendrick Motorsports	Chevrolet	39.368	7
77	Sam Hornish Jr.	Penske Racing	Dodge	39.385	8
18	Kyle Busch	Joe Gibbs Racing	Toyota	39.390	9
5	Mark Martin	Hendrick Motorsports	Chevrolet	39.400	10
00	David Reutimann	Michael Waltrip Racing	Toyota	39.431	11
2	Kurt Busch	Penske Racing	Dodge	39.497	12
82	Scott Speed	Red Bull Racing Team	Toyota	39.518	13
31	Jeff Burton	Richard Childress Racing	Chevrolet	39.542	14
6	David Ragan	Roush Fenway Racing	Ford	39.566	15
14	Tony Stewart	Stewart–Haas Racing	Chevrolet	39.586	16
36	Mike Bliss	Tommy Baldwin Racing	Chevrolet	39.615	17
39	Ryan Newman	Stewart–Haas Racing	Chevrolet	39.620	18
20	Joey Logano	Joe Gibbs Racing	Toyota	39.632	19
17	Matt Kenseth	Roush Fenway Racing	Ford	39.669	20
12	Brad Keselowski	Penske Racing	Dodge	39.706	21
78	Regan Smith	Furniture Row Racing	Chevrolet	39.708	22
83	Brian Vickers	Red Bull Racing Team	Toyota	39.710	23
09	Aric Almirola	Phoenix Racing	Chevrolet	39.710	24
11	Denny Hamlin	Joe Gibbs Racing	Toyota	39.713	25
47	Marcos Ambrose	JTG Daugherty Racing	Toyota	39.729	26
88	Dale Earnhardt Jr.	Hendrick Motorsports	Chevrolet	39.755	27
24	Jeff Gordon	Hendrick Motorsports	Chevrolet	39.767	28
43	A. J. Allmendinger	Richard Petty Motorsports	Ford	39.770	29
55	Michael McDowell	Prism Motorsports	Toyota	39.802	30
99	Carl Edwards	Roush Fenway Racing	Ford	39.830	31
87	Joe Nemechek	NEMCO Motorsports	Toyota	39.833	32
71	Bobby Labonte	TRG Motorsports	Chevrolet	39.870	33
56	Martin Truex Jr.	Michael Waltrip Racing	Toyota	39.884	34
16	Greg Biffle	Roush Fenway Racing	Ford	39.928	35
98	Paul Menard	Richard Petty Motorsports	Ford	39.982	36
19	Elliott Sadler	Richard Petty Motorsports	Ford	40.018	37
37	Kevin Conway	Front Row Motorsports	Ford	40.158	38
34	Travis Kvapil	Front Row Motorsports	Ford	40.229	39
7	Robby Gordon	Robby Gordon Motorsports	Toyota	40.839	40
38	David Gilliland	Front Row Motorsports	Ford	40.861	41
26	Boris Said	Latitude 43 Motorsports	Ford	N/A	42
13	Max Papis	Germain Racing	Toyota	39.889	43
Failed to qualify
90	Casey Mears	Keyed-Up Motorsports	Chevrolet	40.019	
35	Johnny Sauter	Tommy Baldwin Racing	Chevrolet	40.237	
46	Terry Cook	Whitney Motorsports	Dodge	40.435	

=== Race results ===
Pos	Car	Driver	Team	Manufacturer	Laps	Points
1	48	Jimmie Johnson	Hendrick Motorsports	Chevrolet	250	195^{2}
2	29	Kevin Harvick	Richard Childress Racing	Chevrolet	250	175^{1}
3	31	Jeff Burton	Richard Childress Racing	Chevrolet	250	170^{1}
4	5	Mark Martin	Hendrick Motorsports	Chevrolet	250	165^{1}
5	20	Joey Logano	Joe Gibbs Racing	Toyota	250	155
6	2	Kurt Busch	Penske Racing	Dodge	250	155^{1}
7	17	Matt Kenseth	Roush Fenway Racing	Ford	250	146
8	33	Clint Bowyer	Richard Childress Racing	Chevrolet	250	147^{1}
9	14	Tony Stewart	Stewart–Haas Racing	Chevrolet	250	138
10	16	Greg Biffle	Roush Fenway Racing	Ford	250	134
11	82	Scott Speed	Red Bull Racing Team	Toyota	250	135^{1}
12	83	Brian Vickers	Red Bull Racing Team	Toyota	250	132^{1}
13	99	Carl Edwards	Roush Fenway Racing	Ford	250	124
14	18	Kyle Busch	Joe Gibbs Racing	Toyota	250	126^{1}
15	00	David Reutimann	Michael Waltrip Racing	Toyota	250	118
16	77	Sam Hornish Jr.	Penske Racing	Dodge	250	115
17	1	Jamie McMurray	Earnhardt Ganassi Racing	Chevrolet	250	112
18	98	Paul Menard	Richard Petty Motorsports	Ford	250	109
19	78	Regan Smith	Furniture Row Racing	Chevrolet	250	106
20	24	Jeff Gordon	Hendrick Motorsports	Chevrolet	250	108^{1}
21	12	Brad Keselowski	Penske Racing	Dodge	250	100
22	36	Mike Bliss	Tommy Baldwin Racing	Chevrolet	250	97
23	6	David Ragan	Roush Fenway Racing	Ford	250	94
24	19	Elliott Sadler	Richard Petty Motorsports	Ford	249	91
25	43	A. J. Allmendinger	Richard Petty Motorsports	Ford	249	88
26	38	David Gilliland	Front Row Motorsports	Ford	249	85
27	71	Bobby Labonte	TRG Motorsports	Chevrolet	249	82
28	13	Max Papis	Germain Racing	Toyota	249	79
29	11	Denny Hamlin	Joe Gibbs Racing	Toyota	248	81^{1}
30	34	Travis Kvapil	Front Row Motorsports	Ford	248	73
31	37	Kevin Conway	Front Row Motorsports	Ford	247	70
32	88	Dale Earnhardt Jr.	Hendrick Motorsports	Chevrolet	238	67
33	7	Robby Gordon	Robby Gordon Motorsports	Toyota	230	64
34	9	Kasey Kahne	Richard Petty Motorsports	Ford	221	61
35	47	Marcos Ambrose	JTG Daugherty Racing	Toyota	170	58
36	39	Ryan Newman	Stewart–Haas Racing	Chevrolet	148	55
37	42	Juan Pablo Montoya	Earnhardt Ganassi Racing	Chevrolet	140	57^{1}
38	26	Boris Said	Latitude 43 Motorsports	Ford	67	49
39	56	Martin Truex Jr.	Michael Waltrip Racing	Toyota	64	46
40	87	Joe Nemechek	NEMCO Motorsports	Toyota	48	43
41	66	Dave Blaney	Prism Motorsports	Toyota	43	45^{1}
42	55	Michael McDowell	Prism Motorsports	Toyota	40	37
43	09	Aric Almirola	Phoenix Racing	Chevrolet	34	34
^{1} Includes five bonus points for leading a lap
^{2} Includes ten bonus points for leading the most laps

== Standings after the race ==
Drivers' Championship standings

Pos	Driver	Points
1	Kevin Harvick	331
2	Clint Bowyer	312
3	Greg Biffle	304
4	Jamie McMurray	302
5	Jeff Burton	300

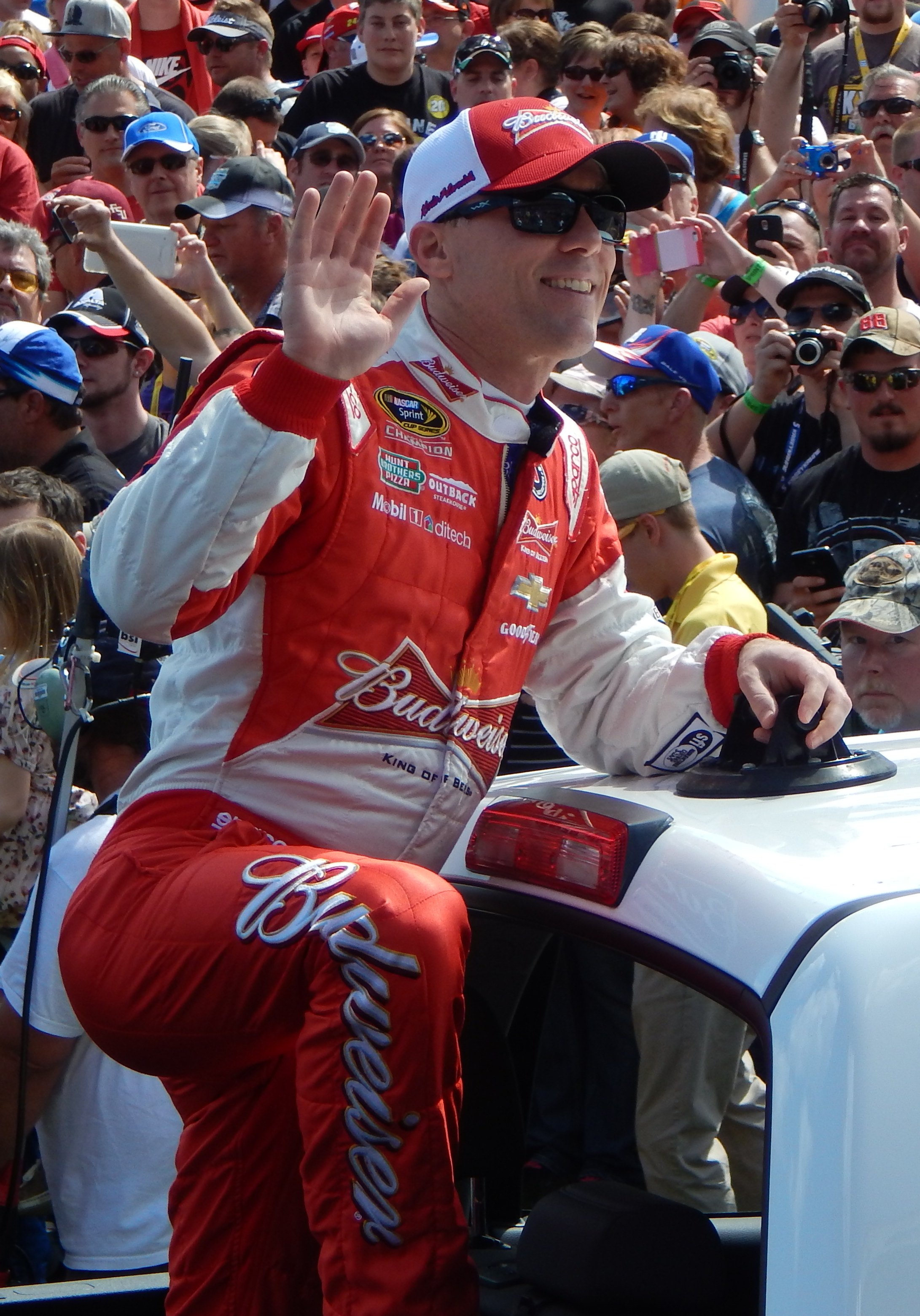
Kevin Harvick became the Drivers' Championship leader after finishing second in the race.

Manufacturers' Championship standings

Pos	Manufacturer	Points
1	Chevrolet	18
2	Toyota	10
3	Ford	9
4	Dodge	7

- Note: Only the top five positions are included for both sets of standings.

Previous race: 2010 Daytona 500	Sprint Cup Series; 2010 season	Next race: 2010 Shelby American
