= 2010 Food City 500 =

Race details
- Race 5 of 36 in the 2010 NASCAR Sprint Cup Series
- 2010 Food City 500 program cover
- Date: March 21, 2010
- Official name: Food City 500
- Location: Bristol Motor Speedway, Bristol, Tennessee
- Course: Permanent racing facility
- Course length: 0.533 miles (0.857 km)
- Distance: 500 laps, 266.5 mi (430 km)
- Weather: Isolated thunderstorms with a high around 57; wind out of the NE at 7 mph. Chance of precipitation 20%.
- Average speed: 79.618 miles per hour (128.133 km/h)

Pole position
Driver	Joey Logano	Joe Gibbs Racing
- Time: 15.396

Most laps led
Driver	Kurt Busch	Penske Racing
- Laps: 278

Winner
No. 48	Jimmie Johnson	Hendrick Motorsports

Television in the United States
- Network: Fox Broadcasting Company
- Announcers: Mike Joy, Darrell Waltrip and Larry McReynolds
- Nielsen ratings: 4.4

The 2010 Food City 500 was held on March 21, 2010, at Bristol Motor Speedway in Bristol, Tennessee as the fifth race of the 2010 NASCAR Sprint Cup Series season. This race marked the last appearance of the rear wing on the Car of Tomorrow, with the spoiler returning the following race.

This race also was the first of three in Carl Edwards' probation following his altercation with Brad Keselowski at the previous race at Atlanta Motor Speedway, in which Keselowski went airborne, subsequently crashing on his side door. The race had 39 lead changes among 13 different leaders and 10 cautions.

The race attendance of 138,000 marked the end of a long streak of sellout seats at the track, which has a capacity of 158,000. The race had been a sellout since 1982.

== Race report ==
=== Practices and qualifying ===
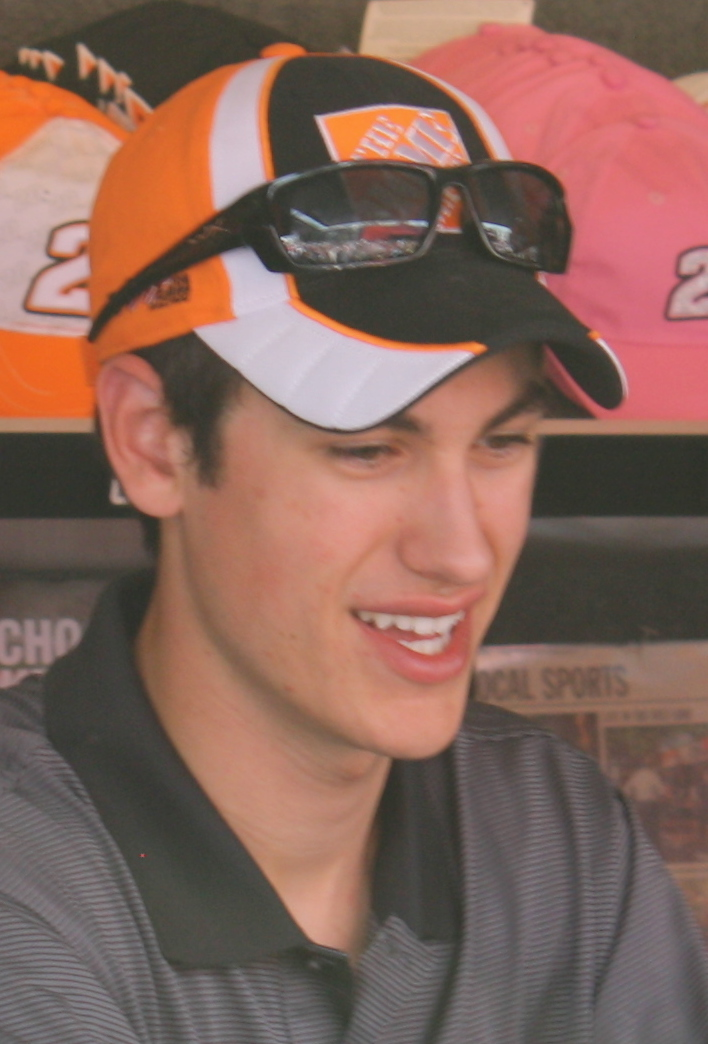
Joey Logano won the pole for the race.

In the first practice, the fastest were Joey Logano, Matt Kenseth, Mark Martin, Jimmie Johnson, and Kasey Kahne; the practice also had three red flags because Kyle Busch, Bobby Labonte, and Jimmie Johnson spun on the frontstretch. During qualifying, Joey Logano won his first Sprint Cup Series pole position while Kurt Busch, Dave Blaney, Jimmie Johnson, and Jeff Gordon rounded out the top-five. There were only two drivers who failed to qualify: Mike Bliss and Max Papis, both suffering their first DNQs of the season. By contrast both Casey Mears (driving for Keyed-Up Motorsports) and rookie Terry Cook (driving for Whitney Motorsports) made their first starts of the season. In the second practice, the fastest were Jimmie Johnson, Juan Pablo Montoya, Jeff Gordon, Dale Earnhardt Jr., and Joey Logano. During final practice, the fastest were Jimmie Johnson, Juan Pablo Montoya, Matt Kenseth, Jamie McMurray, and Joey Logano.

==== Qualifying results ====
Pos.	No.	Driver	Make	Time	Speed	
1	20	Joey Logano	Toyota	15.396	124.630	
2	2	Kurt Busch	Dodge	15.492	123.857	
3	66	Dave Blaney	Toyota	15.493	123.849	*
4	48	Jimmie Johnson	Chevrolet	15.497	123.818	
5	24	Jeff Gordon	Chevrolet	15.512	123.698	
6	42	Juan Pablo Montoya	Chevrolet	15.521	123.626	
7	17	Matt Kenseth	Ford	15.537	123.499	
8	99	Carl Edwards	Ford	15.549	123.403	
9	47	Marcos Ambrose	Toyota	15.561	123.308	
10	00	David Reutimann	Toyota	15.566	123.269	
11	14	Tony Stewart	Chevrolet	15.569	123.245	
12	98	Paul Menard	Ford	15.579	123.166	
13	5	Mark Martin	Chevrolet	15.587	123.103	
14	31	Jeff Burton	Chevrolet	15.609	122.929	
15	11	Denny Hamlin	Toyota	15.612	122.905	
16	38	David Gilliland	Ford	15.613	122.898	
17	1	Jamie McMurray	Chevrolet	15.614	122.890	
18	88	Dale Earnhardt Jr.	Chevrolet	15.614	122.890	
19	56	Martin Truex Jr.	Toyota	15.625	122.803	
20	78	Regan Smith	Chevrolet	15.627	122.787	
21	39	Ryan Newman	Chevrolet	15.638	122.701	
22	77	Sam Hornish Jr.	Dodge	15.647	122.631	
23	43	A.J. Allmendinger	Ford	15.659	122.537	
24	9	Kasey Kahne	Ford	15.675	122.411	
25	16	Greg Biffle	Ford	15.678	122.388	
26	33	Clint Bowyer	Chevrolet	15.684	122.341	
27	09	Aric Almirola	Chevrolet	15.698	122.232	*
28	83	Brian Vickers	Toyota	15.701	122.209	
29	82	Scott Speed	Toyota	15.711	122.131	*
30	6	David Ragan	Ford	15.733	121.960	
31	26	David Stremme	Ford	15.783	121.574	
32	7	Robby Gordon	Toyota	15.786	121.551	
33	29	Kevin Harvick	Chevrolet	15.792	121.505	
34	90	Casey Mears	Chevrolet	15.823	121.267	*
35	87	Joe Nemechek	Toyota	15.833	121.190	*
36	12	Brad Keselowski	Dodge	15.841	121.129	
37	19	Elliott Sadler	Ford	15.844	121.106	
38	18	Kyle Busch	Toyota	15.845	121.098	
39	55	Michael Waltrip	Toyota	15.848	121.075	*
40	46	Terry Cook	Dodge	15.850	121.060	*
41	34	Travis Kvapil	Ford	15.868	120.923	
42	36	Mike Bliss	Chevrolet	15.930	120.452	*
43	13	Max Papis	Toyota	16.014	119.820	*
44	71	Bobby Labonte	Chevrolet	16.193	118.496	PC
45	37	Kevin Conway	Ford	16.268	117.949	OP

OP: qualified via owners points

PC: qualified as past champion

PR: provisional

QR: via qualifying race

* - had to qualify on time

Failed to qualify, withdrew, or driver changes: Mike Bliss (#36), Max Papis (#13)

=== Race summary ===
For pre-race concerts, the musical group 4TROOPS, a military band, and Lee Greenwood performed for the fans. Afterward, 4TROOPS performed the National Anthem, and Rev. Mike Rife, of Vansant Church of Christ, gave the Invocation. Steve Austin gave the command "Gentlemen, start your engines!". Before the race, Terry Cook moved to the back of the field because he missed driver introductions. For the first time in his young career, Joey Logano led the field for the green flag. Immediately after the start, Kurt Busch passed him for the lead. On lap 6, Jimmie Johnson passed Busch for the lead. While Logano fell back, Johnson continued to lead until lap 30; Busch passed him in heavy traffic. Busch kept the lead until lap 40, at the first caution. The caution came out when Dave Blaney had a flat tire. Brad Keselowski stayed out while other drivers came in to change tires and add gasoline which resulted him getting the lead. On lap 46, the green flag came out again. Keselowski kept the lead until lap 53 when Jimmie Johnson passed him. Five laps later, the second caution came out because Clint Bowyer slammed into the wall from a blown engine. Few drivers went to change tires and add gasoline on this caution; Johnson led the field to the green flag on lap 62. Johnson kept the lead until lap 99 when Busch passed him in traffic. After Kurt Busch led for seventeen laps, the third caution came out because Denny Hamlin hit the wall in turn two. Most drivers went to pit road to change their tires, but Busch was first off pit road and led them to the green flag on lap 123. Busch's lead would not continue for long as Greg Biffle passed him on lap 124. Three laps later, the fourth caution came out because of rain. With the few rain drops at the track, NASCAR decided to keep the cars on the track to help make sure the track would stay dry. After a sixteen lap caution period, the race resumed on lap 143 with Biffle as the leader. On lap 158, Jimmie Johnson attempted to get the lead but Biffle remained the leader. On lap 191 he was passed by Juan Pablo Montoya for the lead, but four laps later Biffle retook it.

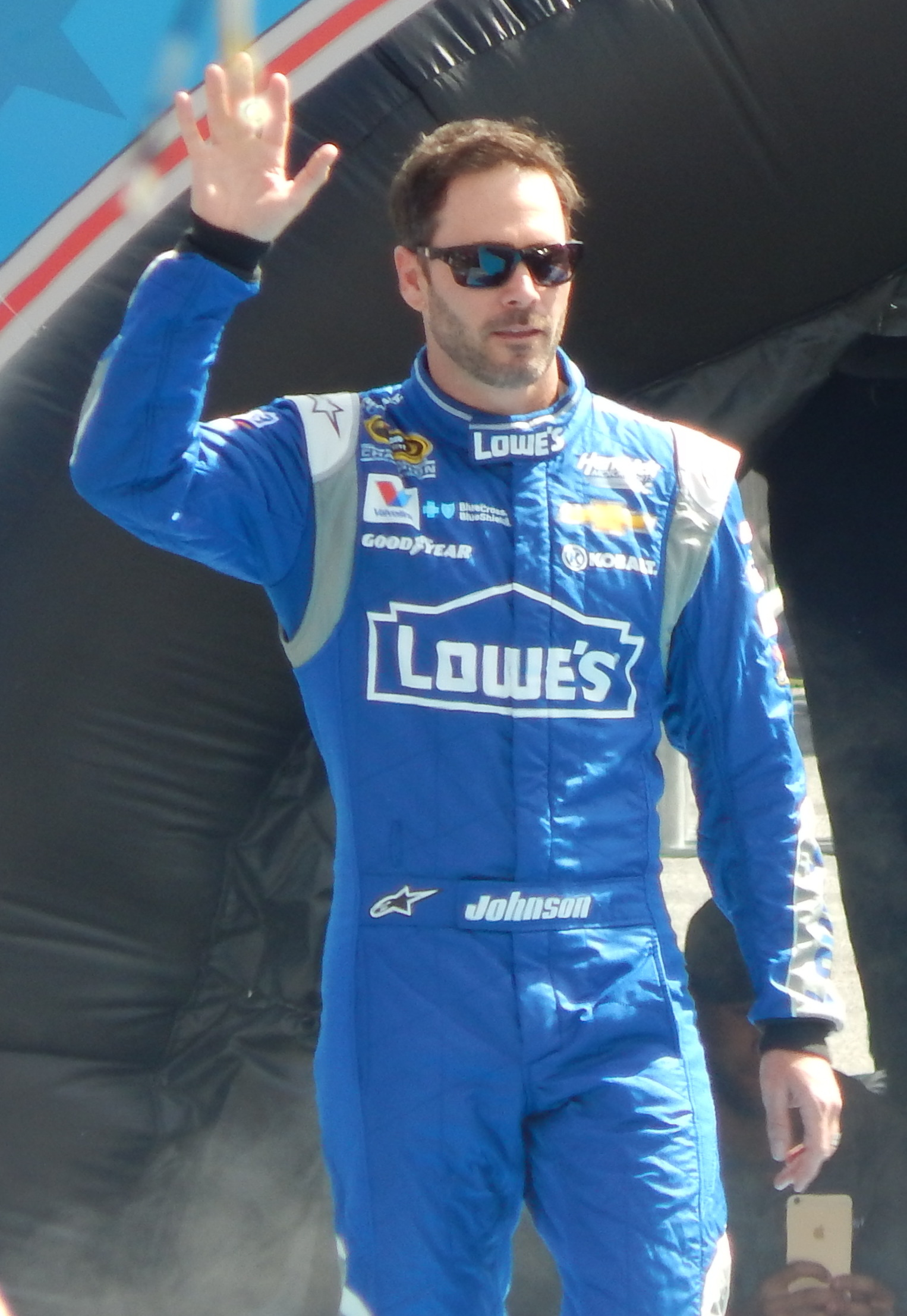
Race winner Jimmie Johnson in 2015.

Nine laps later, on lap 204, Biffle was still the leader, but the fifth caution flag came out because Kasey Kahne hit the wall. On lap 210 the green flag came out with Juan Pablo Montoya the leader. After some switching positions on lap 223 Kurt Busch took the lead. Soon after the lead change, there was a green flag run until lap 263 when the sixth yellow came out because Kyle Busch slammed the outside wall. The race resumed on lap 271 with Kurt Busch the leader.

At lap 300, the top three drivers were Kurt Busch, Mark Martin, and Jimmie Johnson. Then on lap 323 the seventh caution flag waved because Regan Smith had tire troubles. Kurt Busch won the race out of pit road to lead the field to the green flag on lap 331. Ten laps later, on lap 342, the eighth caution came out because of a large wreck. The wreck started with Mark Martin and Greg Biffle colliding; thirteen more cars were involved. On lap 358, the green flag came out with Kurt Busch the leader. By lap 370, the top three positions were occupied by Kurt Busch, Jimmie Johnson, and Jamie McMurray. Rain brought out the ninth caution twenty laps later.

On lap 411, the green flag came back out with Brad Keselowski the leader; Kurt Busch passed him three laps later. By lap 433, Jimmie Johnson caught Kurt Busch. Johnson tried to pass Busch on lap 444, but did not get the lead. During the longest green flag run of the race, Joey Logano hit the turn two wall on lap 479; there was no caution. Three laps later, the tenth caution came out because of debris on the track. During pit stops, Greg Biffle beat everyone out of pit road to lead the field to the green flag on lap 490. Busch and Johnson were fifth and sixth. On lap 492, Tony Stewart took the lead from Biffle; Johnson passed him on the outside a lap later. Jimmie Johnson kept the lead to earn his first career win at Bristol. It was his fiftieth win in his Sprint Cup Series career, and his third win of 2010.

== Race results ==
Pos	No.	Driver	Team	Make
1	48	Jimmie Johnson	Hendrick Motorsports	Chevrolet
2	14	Tony Stewart	Stewart–Haas Racing	Chevrolet
3	2	Kurt Busch	Penske Racing	Dodge
4	16	Greg Biffle	Roush Fenway Racing	Ford
5	17	Matt Kenseth	Roush Fenway Racing	Ford
6	99	Carl Edwards	Roush Fenway Racing	Ford
7	88	Dale Earnhardt Jr.	Hendrick Motorsports	Chevrolet
8	1	Jamie McMurray	Earnhardt Ganassi Racing	Chevrolet
9	18	Kyle Busch	Joe Gibbs Racing	Toyota
10	31	Jeff Burton	Richard Childress Racing	Chevrolet
11	29	Kevin Harvick	Richard Childress Racing	Chevrolet
12	56	Martin Truex Jr.	Michael Waltrip Racing	Toyota
13	12	Brad Keselowski	Penske Racing	Dodge
14	24	Jeff Gordon	Hendrick Motorsports	Chevrolet
15	83	Brian Vickers	Red Bull Racing Team	Toyota
16	39	Ryan Newman	Stewart–Haas Racing	Chevrolet
17	43	A. J. Allmendinger	Richard Petty Motorsports	Ford
18	98	Paul Menard	Richard Petty Motorsports	Ford
19	11	Denny Hamlin	Joe Gibbs Racing	Toyota
20	19	Elliott Sadler	Richard Petty Motorsports	Ford
21	71	Bobby Labonte	TRG Motorsports	Chevrolet
22	7	Robby Gordon	Robby Gordon Motorsports	Toyota
23	38	David Gilliland	Front Row Motorsports	Ford
24	26	David Stremme	Latitude 43 Motorsports	Ford
25	34	Travis Kvapil	Front Row Motorsports	Ford
26	42	Juan Pablo Montoya	Earnhardt Ganassi Racing	Chevrolet
27	20	Joey Logano	Joe Gibbs Racing	Toyota
28	37	Kevin Conway	Front Row Motorsports	Ford
29	6	David Ragan	Roush Fenway Racing	Ford
30	90	Casey Mears	Keyed Up Motorsports	Chevrolet
31	82	Scott Speed	Red Bull Racing Team	Toyota
32	77	Sam Hornish Jr.	Penske Racing	Dodge
33	47	Marcos Ambrose	JTG Daugherty Racing	Toyota
34	9	Kasey Kahne	Richard Petty Motorsports	Ford
35	5	Mark Martin	Hendrick Motorsports	Chevrolet
36	78	Regan Smith	Furniture Row Racing	Chevrolet
37	46	Terry Cook	Whitney Motorsports	Dodge
38	00	David Reutimann	Michael Waltrip Racing	Toyota
39	09	Aric Almirola	Phoenix Racing	Chevrolet
40	33	Clint Bowyer	Richard Childress Racing	Chevrolet
41	55	Michael Waltrip	Prism Motorsports	Toyota
42	66	Dave Blaney	Prism Motorsports	Toyota
43	87	Joe Nemechek	NEMCO Motorsports	Toyota

Previous race: 2010 Kobalt Tools 500	Sprint Cup Series; 2010 season	Next race: 2010 Goody's Fast Pain Relief 500
