= 2010 Shelby American =

Race details
- Race 3 of 36 in the 2010 NASCAR Sprint Cup Series
- Date: February 28, 2010
- Official name: Shelby American
- Location: Las Vegas Motor Speedway, Las Vegas, Nevada
- Course: Permanent racing facility
- Course length: 1.5 miles (2.41 km)
- Distance: 267 laps, 400.5 mi (644.542 km)
- Weather: Sunny with a high around 64; wind out of the NNE at 6 mph. There was a zero percent chance of precipitation.
- Average speed: 141.450 miles per hour (227.642 km/h)

Pole position
Driver	Kurt Busch	Penske Racing
- Time: 28.614

Most laps led
Driver	Jeff Gordon	Hendrick Motorsports
- Laps: 219

Winner
No. 48	Jimmie Johnson	Hendrick Motorsports

Television in the United States
- Network: Fox Broadcasting Company
- Announcers: Mike Joy, Darrell Waltrip and Larry McReynolds

The 2010 Shelby American at Las Vegas was a NASCAR Sprint Cup Series motor race that was held on February 28, 2010 at Las Vegas Motor Speedway in Las Vegas, Nevada as the third race of the 2010 NASCAR Sprint Cup Series season. The race consisted of 267 laps, 400.5 miles (644.5 km)

The race began with Kurt Busch, from Penske Racing, on the pole. During the race there were ten different leaders, twenty lead changes, and seven cautions. Jimmie Johnson, from Hendrick Motorsports, ended up winning the 2010 Shelby American while Kevin Harvick finished 2nd and Jeff Gordon finished third after leading the most laps (219).

== Race report ==
=== Practices and qualifying ===
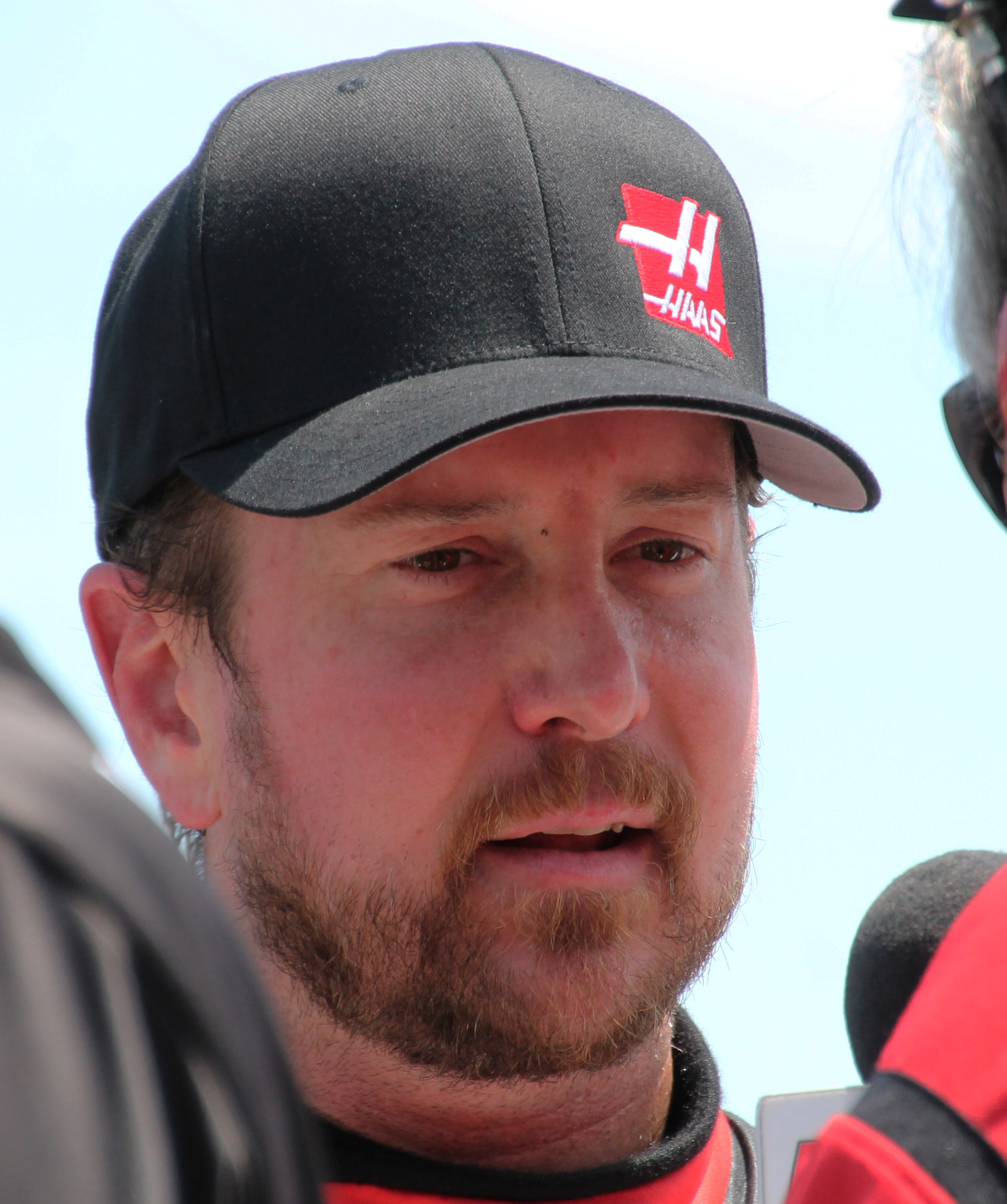
Polesitter Kurt Busch (pictured in 2015)

In the first practice session on February 26, the fastest were Juan Pablo Montoya, Sam Hornish Jr., Jimmie Johnson, Mark Martin, Jeff Gordon. During qualifying runs, Kurt Busch ran the fastest lap with a speed of 188.719 miles per hour (303.714 km/h) and a time of 28.614 seconds to be on the pole position, while Casey Mears and Terry Cook failed to qualify. In the second practice session, Kyle Busch, Greg Biffle, Kurt Busch, David Reutimann, and Clint Bowyer were the fastest. In final practice Clint Bowyer, Juan Pablo Montoya, Mark Martin, Jimmie Johnson, and Marcos Ambrose were the fastest. Unlike the first two practice sessions, final practice had one red flag because Dale Earnhardt Jr. spun to pit road.

=== Race summary ===
On February 28, 2010, at 3 p.m. EST, Las Vegas Motor Speedway's Chaplain Joe Freiburger said the invocation. Afterward, America's Got Talent winner Terry Fator sang the national anthem. Carroll Shelby and Kim Kardashian gave the command "Gentlemen, start your engines!" for the race.

On the start, Kurt Busch led the field to the green flag. On the same lap, Jeff Gordon passed Kurt Busch for the lead. On lap 2, Kevin Conway collided with the wall; to cause the first caution. On lap 5, Gordon led the field to the green flag. After the restart, the field became spread out, but on lap 45, Mike Bliss collided with the wall to bring out the second caution. The restart happened on lap 52, with Gordon leading. One lap later, Greg Biffle passed Gordon, and the third caution came out. The third caution came out because the caution lights did not turn off. On the lap 56 restart, Biffle led the field to the green flag, but one lap later, Gordon reclaimed the lead.

The race then experienced a 30 lap run that ended because Sam Hornish Jr. spun to bring out the fourth caution. All the leaders pitted, but the first one off pit road was Matt Kenseth. On lap 92, Kenseth led them down for the restart. One lap later, though, the fifth caution came out because Jamie McMurray collided with Juan Pablo Montoya. A. J. Allmendinger was also involved in the accident. The restart happened on lap 97 with Kenseth still the leader, but on lap 98, Gordon passed him. On lap 107, the sixth caution came out because the caution lights inadvertently turned on. Most lead lap cars made their pit stop, but Scott Speed stayed out to become the leader.

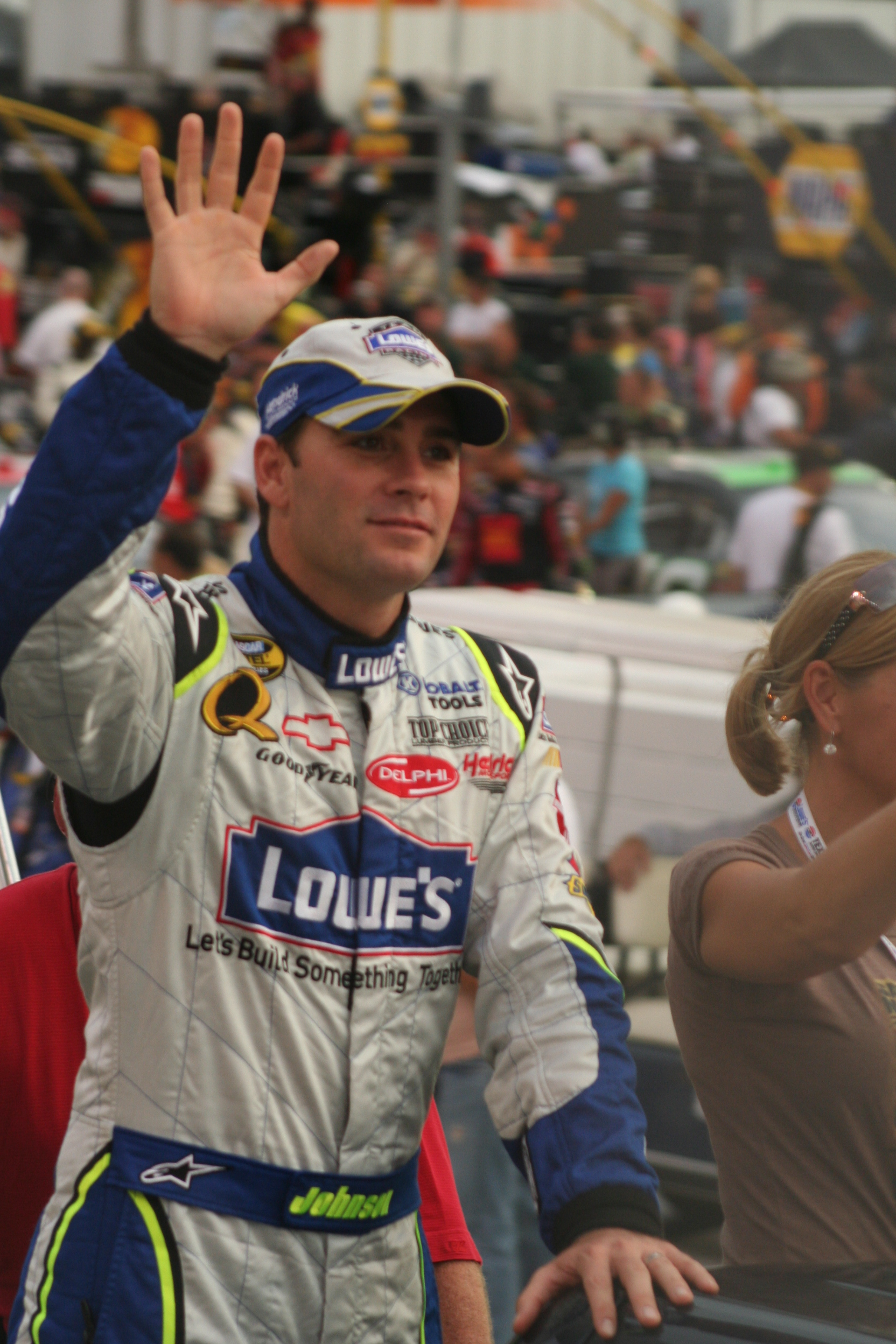
Race winner Jimmie Johnson in 2007.

On lap 113, Speed led the field to the green flag. Also, on the restart, Speed had a horrible start, that caused Gordon to pass him. From lap 113 to 228, a long green flag run happened. On lap 158, green flag pit stops began. During the pit stops the leaders were Jimmie Johnson, Kevin Harvick, Kyle Busch, Tony Stewart. Afterwards, the top-five drivers were Gordon, Jimmie Johnson, Kenseth, Jeff Burton, and Harvick. Then on lap 212, green flag pit stops happened again. After the pit stops the leader was Gordon. On lap 228, the seventh caution came out because Conway collided with the wall. Bowyer stayed off pit road to lead on the restart. Immediately after the start, on lap 233, Gordon reclaimed the lead. On lap 251, Johnson passed Gordon for the lead. Johnson kept the lead to win his second consecutive race in 2010.

== Race results ==
Pos	Car	Driver	Team	Make
1	48	Jimmie Johnson	Hendrick Motorsports	Chevrolet
2	29	Kevin Harvick	Richard Childress Racing	Chevrolet
3	24	Jeff Gordon	Hendrick Motorsports	Chevrolet
4	5	Mark Martin	Hendrick Motorsports	Chevrolet
5	17	Matt Kenseth	Roush–Fenway Racing	Ford
6	20	Joey Logano	Joe Gibbs Racing	Toyota
7	14	Tony Stewart	Stewart–Haas Racing	Chevrolet
8	33	Clint Bowyer	Richard Childress Racing	Chevrolet
9	9	Kasey Kahne	Richard Petty Motorsports	Ford
10	16	Greg Biffle	Roush–Fenway Racing	Ford
11	31	Jeff Burton	Richard Childress Racing	Chevrolet
12	99	Carl Edwards	Roush–Fenway Racing	Ford
13	00	David Reutimann	Michael Waltrip Racing	Toyota
14	47	Marcos Ambrose	JTG Daugherty Racing	Toyota
15	18	Kyle Busch	Joe Gibbs Racing	Toyota
16	88	Dale Earnhardt Jr.	Hendrick Motorsports	Chevrolet
17	98	Paul Menard	Richard Petty Motorsports	Ford
18	39	Ryan Newman	Stewart–Haas Racing	Chevrolet
19	11	Denny Hamlin	Joe Gibbs Racing	Toyota
20	56	Martin Truex Jr.	Michael Waltrip Racing	Toyota
21	78	Regan Smith	Furniture Row Racing	Chevrolet
22	82	Scott Speed	Red Bull Racing Team	Toyota
23	6	David Ragan	Roush Fenway Racing	Ford
24	34	Travis Kvapil	Front Row Motorsports	Ford
25	43	A. J. Allmendinger	Richard Petty Motorsports	Ford
26	12	Brad Keselowski	Penske Championship Racing	Dodge
27	19	Elliott Sadler	Richard Petty Motorsports	Ford
28	77	Sam Hornish Jr.	Penske Championship Racing	Dodge
29	66	Dave Blaney	Prism Motorsports	Toyota
30	38	David Gilliland	Front Row Motorsports	Ford
31	83	Brian Vickers	Red Bull Racing	Toyota
32	7	Robby Gordon	Robby Gordon Motorsports	Toyota
33	13	Max Papis	Germain Racing	Toyota
34	1	Jamie McMurray	Earnhardt Ganassi Racing	Chevrolet
35	2	Kurt Busch	Penske Championship Racing	Dodge
36	37	Kevin Conway	Front Row Motorsports	Ford
37	42	Juan Pablo Montoya	Earnhardt Ganassi Racing	Chevrolet
38	71	Bobby Labonte	TRG Motorsports	Chevrolet
39	36	Mike Bliss	Tommy Baldwin Racing	Chevrolet
40	26	Boris Said	Latitude 43 Motorsports	Ford
41	87	Joe Nemechek	NEMCO Motorsports	Toyota
42	55	Michael McDowell	Prism Motorsports	Toyota
43	09	Aric Almirola	Phoenix Racing	Chevrolet

Previous race: 2010 Auto Club 500	Sprint Cup Series; 2010 season	Next race: 2010 Kobalt Tools 500
