= 2010 Subway Fresh Fit 600 =

Race details
- Race 7 of 36 in the 2010 NASCAR Sprint Cup Series
- The 2010 Subway Fresh Fit 600 program cover, featuring Kyle Busch and Jeff Gordon.
- Date: April 10, 2010
- Official name: Subway Fresh Fit 600
- Location: Phoenix International Raceway in Avondale, Arizona
- Course: Permanent racing facility
- Course length: 1 miles (1.6 km)
- Distance: 378 laps, 378 mi (608.332 km)
- Scheduled distance: 375 laps, 375 mi (603.504 km)
- Weather: Sunny with a high around 88; wind out of the SSE at 12 mph.
- Average speed: 119 miles per hour (192 km/h)

Pole position
Driver	A. J. Allmendinger	Richard Petty Motorsports
- Time: 26.731

Most laps led
Driver	Jimmie Johnson / Kyle Busch	Hendrick Motorsports / Joe Gibbs Racing
- Laps: 113

Winner
No. 39	Ryan Newman	Stewart–Haas Racing

Television in the United States
- Network: Fox Broadcasting Company
- Announcers: Mike Joy, Darrell Waltrip and Larry McReynolds

The 2010 Subway Fresh Fit 600 was a NASCAR Sprint Cup Series motor race held on April 10, 2010 at Phoenix International Raceway in Avondale, Arizona. It was the seventh race of the 2010 NASCAR Sprint Cup Series season. The event began at 7:30 p.m. EDT. It was televised live in the United States on Fox and its U.S. radio coverage was broadcast on Motor Racing Network starting at 6:30 p.m. EDT. It was also the longest race held there since 1988.

The race, contested over 378 laps, was won by Ryan Newman from Stewart–Haas Racing, after starting fourteenth to polesitter A. J. Allmendinger. Jeff Gordon finished second for Hendrick Motorsports, while his teammate Jimmie Johnson finished the race in third. The race had a total of nine cautions and twenty lead changes among thirteen different drivers.

== Race report ==
=== Practices and qualifying ===
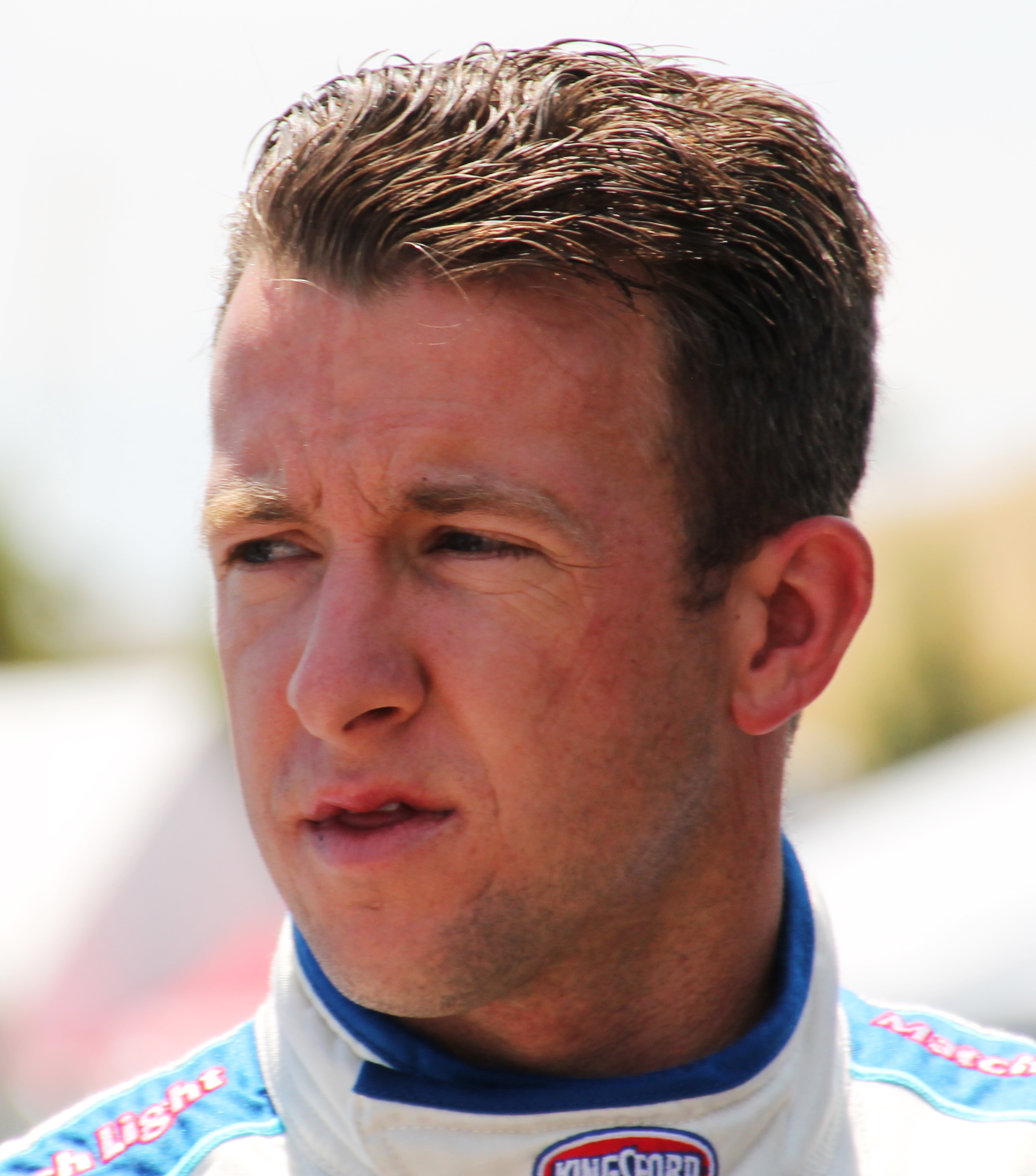
Polesitter A. J. Allmendinger (Pictured in 2015)

During the first practice, the fastest cars were Denny Hamlin, Michael McDowell, Jamie McMurray, Kurt Busch, and Dale Earnhardt Jr.; near the end of the practice session Tony Stewart lost control of his car. The second practice began with several spins by drivers such as Kyle Busch, Marcos Ambrose, and Jimmie Johnson. The fastest drivers in the session were Jeff Gordon, A. J. Allmendinger, Ryan Newman, Greg Biffle, and Jeff Burton. During qualifying, Allmendinger won the pole position, while David Stremme, Aric Almirola, Mike Bliss, and Brandon Ash failed to qualify for the race.

=== Race summary ===
The pre-race ceremonies began with a moment of silence honoring the fallen coal miners in West Virginia; then Phoenix International Raceway's chaplain Ken Bowers gave the invocation. The national anthem, played on the trumpet, was performed by Dr. Jesse McGuire. Following this, professional boxer and grand marshal Laila Ali delivered the command to start engines. At 7:46 p.m EST, Allmendinger led the field to the green flag to start the race. After 14 laps, the first caution came out because Kasey Kahne and Kurt Busch made contact. On lap 22, Ryan Newman restarted in the lead, but the second caution came out one lap later because Jamie McMurray spun out. On the ensuing restart on lap 29, Tony Stewart led the drivers to the green flag. Stewart led until Juan Pablo Montoya passed him on lap 38. Then on lap 58, Brian Vickers spun and slammed the outside wall bringing out the third caution. Montoya led the race on the next restart on lap 63. The race proceeded to go caution-free for 72 laps.

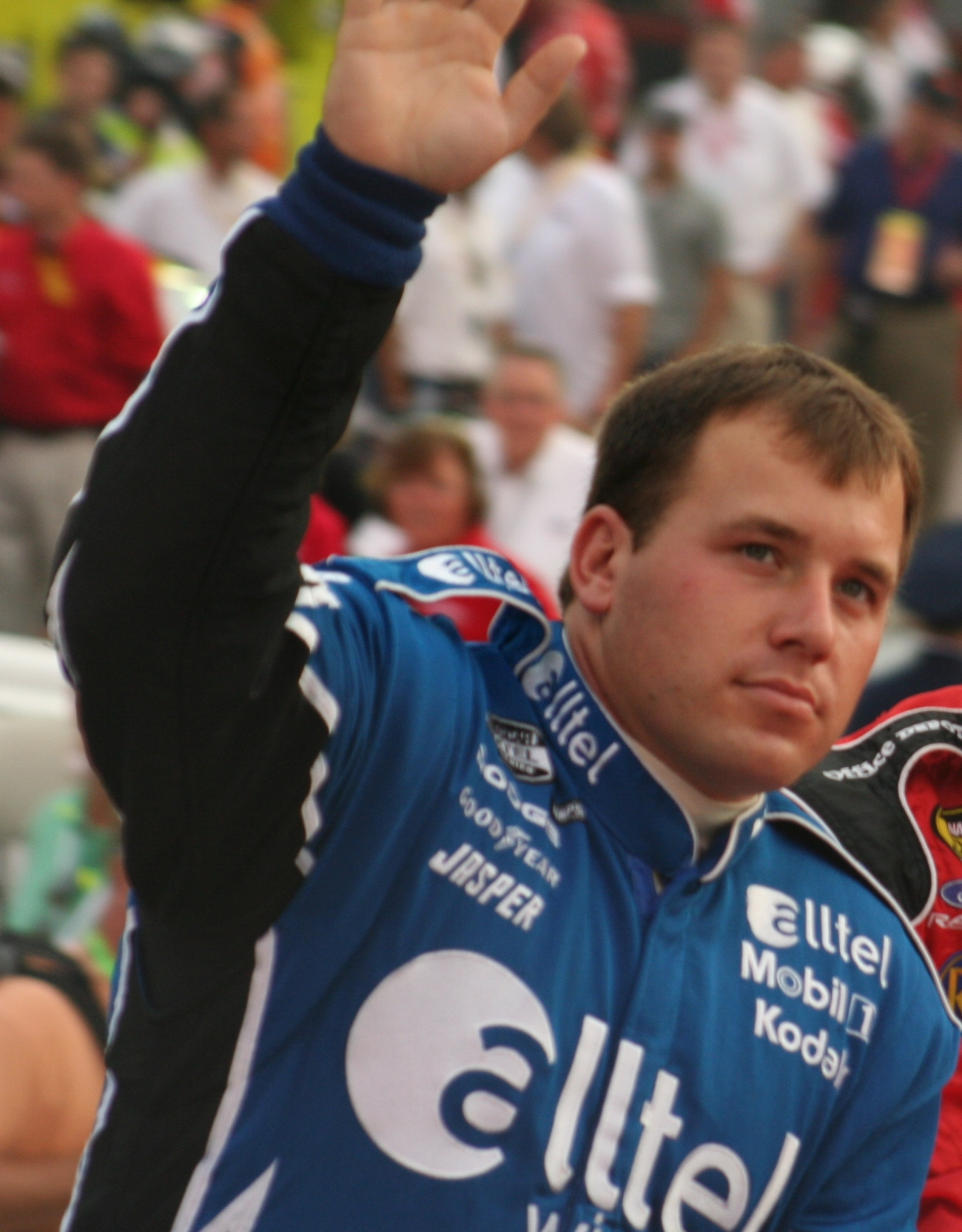
Race winner Ryan Newman in 2007

During the long run, Jimmie Johnson passed Montoya on lap 130 as green flag pit stops were under way. Montoya regained the lead after the pit stops, but a lap later the fourth caution came out because of debris. The green flag was given on lap 148, with Montoya the leader. On lap 149, Johnson passed Montoya for the lead. After the lead change, the race underwent a green flag run until lap 190 when the fifth caution came out as a result of oil on the track in turn two. Every driver on the lead lap made a pit stop; Johnson kept the lead coming off pit road. Shortly after the restart on lap 196, the sixth caution came out because Brad Keselowski slammed into the wall. The restart happened on lap 201 with Johnson the leader. After the restart, the race had a run of green flag laps which ended because of the seventh caution on lap 256, caused by David Reutimann spinning out.

On the restart immediately following the seventh caution, Jimmie Johnson led the field back to the green flag on lap 262, but was quickly passed by Kyle Busch. After the restart, the race had a 52 lap green flag run which ended because of the eighth caution due to Travis Kvapil's engine problems. The restart occurred on lap 321, with Kyle Busch in the lead. Busch led until lap 372 when the ninth caution came out because Scott Riggs had tire problems. All the leaders pitted, but while the top six replaced two tires, the rest changed all four. On the restart, Jeff Gordon led the field to the green flag with two laps to go. Newman passed Gordon before taking the white flag. Newman won his first race of the 2010 season, which was also his first victory since the 2008 Daytona 500.

== Race results ==
Pos	Grid	Car	Driver	Team	Make
1	14	39	Ryan Newman	Stewart–Haas Racing	Chevrolet
2	10	24	Jeff Gordon	Hendrick Motorsports	Chevrolet
3	16	48	Jimmie Johnson	Hendrick Motorsports	Chevrolet
4	23	5	Mark Martin	Hendrick Motorsports	Chevrolet
5	7	42	Juan Pablo Montoya	Earnhardt Ganassi Racing	Chevrolet
6	27	17	Matt Kenseth	Roush Fenway Racing	Ford
7	9	99	Carl Edwards	Roush Fenway Racing	Ford
8	17	18	Kyle Busch	Joe Gibbs Racing	Toyota
9	25	33	Clint Bowyer	Richard Childress Racing	Chevrolet
10	6	20	Joey Logano	Joe Gibbs Racing	Toyota
11	4	47	Marcos Ambrose	JTG Daugherty Racing	Toyota
12	5	88	Dale Earnhardt Jr.	Hendrick Motorsports	Chevrolet
13	24	29	Kevin Harvick	Richard Childress Racing	Chevrolet
14	33	7	Robby Gordon	Robby Gordon Motorsports	Toyota
15	1	43	A. J. Allmendinger	Richard Petty Motorsports	Ford
16	22	12	Brad Keselowski	Penske Racing	Dodge
17	8	56	Martin Truex Jr.	Michael Waltrip Racing	Ford
18	3	77	Sam Hornish Jr.	Penske Racing	Dodge
19	29	6	David Ragan	Roush Fenway Racing	Ford
20	39	00	David Reutimann	Michael Waltrip Racing	Toyota
21	2	82	Scott Speed	Red Bull Racing	Toyota
22	30	16	Greg Biffle	Roush Fenway Racing	Ford
23	11	14	Tony Stewart	Stewart–Haas Racing	Chevrolet
24	13	1	Jamie McMurray	Earnhardt Ganassi Racing	Chevrolet
25	15	31	Jeff Burton	Richard Childress Racing	Chevrolet
26	28	78	Regan Smith	Furniture Row Racing	Chevrolet
27	40	71	Bobby Labonte	TRG Motorsports	Chevrolet
28	35	90	Scott Riggs	Keyed-Up Motorsports	Chevrolet
29	32	98	Paul Menard	Richard Petty Motorsports	Ford
30	26	11	Denny Hamlin	Joe Gibbs Racing	Toyota
31	38	19	Elliott Sadler	Richard Petty Motorsports	Ford
32	36	37	David Gilliland	Front Row Motorsports	Ford
33	42	38	Kevin Conway	Front Row Motorsports	Ford
34	43	46	Terry Cook	Whitney Motorsports	Dodge
35	19	2	Kurt Busch	Penske Racing	Dodge
36	41	34	Travis Kvapil	Front Row Motorsports	Ford
37	21	83	Brian Vickers	Red Bull Racing	Toyota
38	18	87	Joe Nemechek	NEMCO Motorsports	Toyota
39	20	9	Kasey Kahne	Richard Petty Motorsports	Ford
40	34	13	Max Papis	Germain Racing	Toyota
41	37	35	Johnny Sauter	Tommy Baldwin Racing	Chevrolet
42	31	55	Dave Blaney	Prism Motorsports	Toyota
43	12	66	Michael McDowell	Prism Motorsports	Toyota

Previous race: 2010 Goody's Fast Pain Relief 500	Sprint Cup Series; 2010 season	Next race: 2010 Samsung Mobile 500
