= 2010 Goody's Fast Pain Relief 500 =

Auto race at Martinsville in 2010

Race details
- Race 6 of 36 in the 2010 NASCAR Sprint Cup Series
- A map showing the layout of Martinsville Speedway
- Date: March 29, 2010
- Official name: Goody's Fast Pain Relief 500
- Location: Martinsville Speedway, Martinsville, Virginia
- Course: Permanent racing facility
- Course length: 0.526 miles (0.85 km)
- Distance: 508 laps, 267 mi (430 km)
- Weather: Mostly cloudy with a high around 59; wind out of the ESE at 6 mph.
- Average speed: 73.180 miles per hour (117.772 km/h)

Pole position
Driver	Kevin Harvick	Richard Childress; Racing

Most laps led
Driver	Denny Hamlin	Joe Gibbs Racing
- Laps: 171

Winner
No. 11	Denny Hamlin	Joe Gibbs Racing

Television in the United States
- Network: Fox Broadcasting Company
- Announcers: Mike Joy, Darrell Waltrip and Larry McReynolds

The 2010 Goody's Fast Pain Relief 500 at Martinsville Speedway in Martinsville, Virginia was the sixth race of the 2010 NASCAR Sprint Cup Series season. It was scheduled to start at 1 p.m. EDT on March 28, 2010, but due to rain it ran on March 29, 2010, at 12 noon EDT. The 2010 Goody's Fast Pain Relief 500 was televised on Fox and was broadcast on MRN radio. This race was the first race that the spoiler replaced the wing on the Car of Tomorrow. The race had eight leaders, 26 lead changes, and 13 cautions.

== Race report ==
=== Practices and qualifying ===
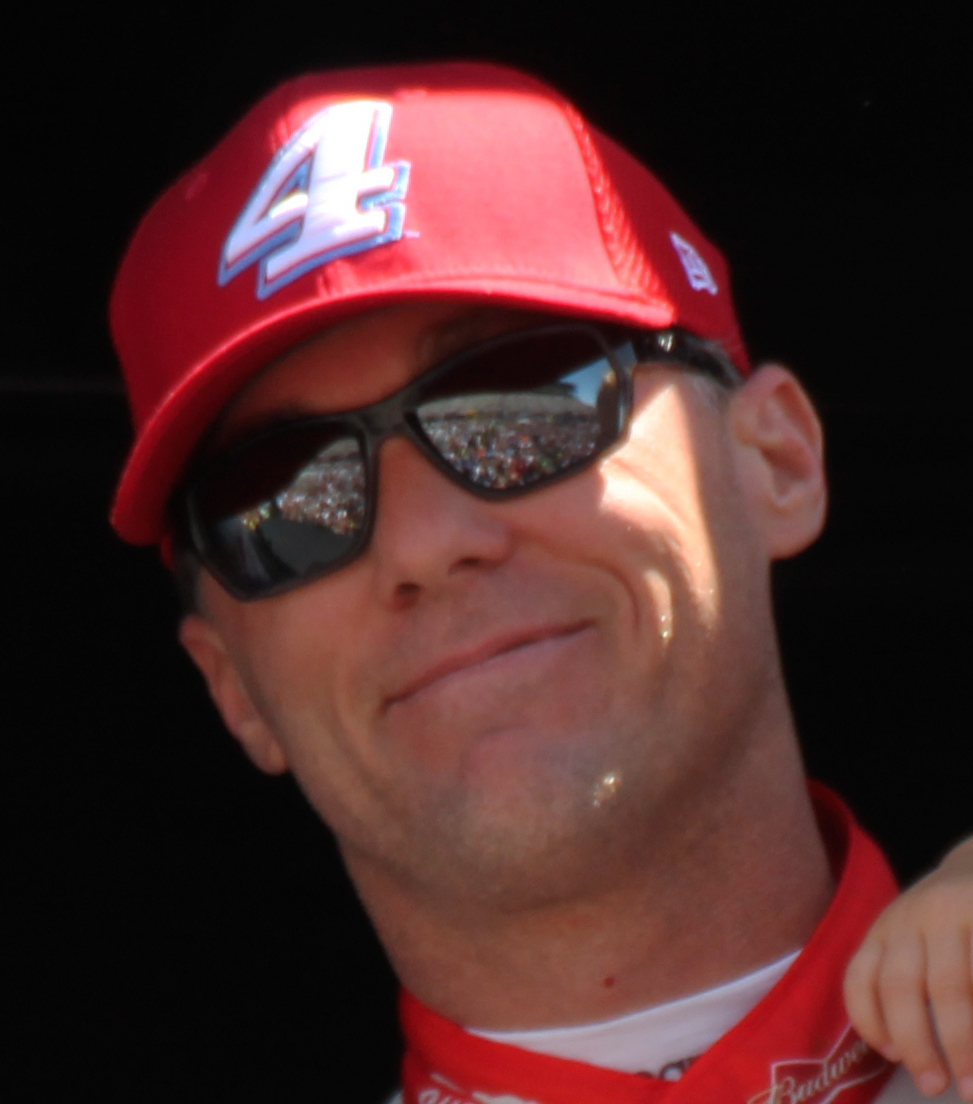
Pole-sitter Kevin Harvick in 2015.

During the first practice on March 26, 2010, the fastest were Ryan Newman, Mark Martin, Marcos Ambrose, Jeff Gordon, and Denny Hamlin. There was no major contact during first practice except for between Tony Stewart and Travis Kvapil. Qualifying for the Martinsville race was canceled because of rain showers in the area which caused them to line-up by points. The pole-sitter was Kevin Harvick, and Casey Mears, Terry Cook, and Johnny Sauter did not qualify. During the second practice on March 27, 2010, the fastest were Mark Martin, Jeff Burton, Brian Vickers, Juan Pablo Montoya, and Jeff Gordon; there was no major contact in the practice. The faster cars in Happy Hour (the final practice) on March 27, 2010, were Jamie McMurray, Jeff Burton, Clint Bowyer, Jeff Gordon, and Denny Hamlin.

=== Race summary ===
The race was scheduled to start on Sunday, March 28, 2010, but rain delayed the event until noon EDT on Monday, March 29. The pre-race ceremonies began with Joey McNeil from Fort Trail Baptist Church saying the invocation. The Martinsville High School Jazz Band played the US national anthem, and Henry County administrator Benny Summerlin gave the command "Gentleman Start Your Engines'". Robby Gordon was sent to the back of the starting grid because he changed engines after Happy Hour. NASCAR announced before the race that there would be a competition caution on lap 50. At 12:16 p.m., the green flag waved with Kevin Harvick the leader. Kevin Harvick stayed the leader until lap 41 when the first caution stopped the field because of a tire going down on Joe Nemechek's car. Since this caution came out near NASCAR's schedule competition caution on Lap 50, NASCAR canceled the competition caution. On lap 46, Kevin Harvick led to the green flag with Kurt Busch second. After a ten lap run, Jeff Gordon passed Kevin for the lead. Then on lap 63, David Stremme spun in turn four to bring out the second caution. Jeff Gordon, who stayed out of pit road, was still the leading when the green flag waved. Afterwards, on lap 75, David Reutimann spun in turn one to cause the third caution of the race. Jeff Gordon was still leading the race when race resumed, but a lap later Kurt Busch edged Jeff to lead lap 82. Then Jeff passed Kurt to lead again on lap 89.

After the lead change, the race experienced a run of 46 laps. During the laps, Kevin Harvick took his Chevrolet to the garage because of brake issues, and on lap 125 Juan Pablo Montoya collided into the wall; he went to the garage with major damage. The run ended because Robby Gordon, who blew a tire, caused the fourth caution to be waved. After all of the lead lap cars pitted the leader was Jeff Gordon. On lap 140, Kurt Busch passed Jeff for the lead, but on lap 149 Jeff Burton passed Jeff and Kurt to get the lead. Thirteen laps later the fifth caution was given because Greg Biffle spun after having contact with Marcos Ambrose. During pit stops, Mark Martin stayed out to lead the field to the green flag on lap 168. On lap 170, the sixth caution was given because Elliott Sadler spun in turn four after contact with David Stremme. On the restart the leader was Mark Martin. A lap later, Mark Martin was passed by Kurt Busch on the backstretch. After leading eight more laps, Kurt Busch was passed by Mark Martin for the lead. On lap 199, Kurt Busch was falling back while Jeff Burton passed Mark for the lead.

After the lead change on lap 199, most of the passing was from the back, but on lap 230 Denny Hamlin passed Jeff Burton for the lead. Four laps later the seventh yellow flag was given because Regan Smith and Robby Gordon couldn't get to pit road after getting in to the wall. On the restart, Denny Hamlin took the field to the green flag. Soon after, Jeff Burton passed Hamlin to lead again. On lap 264, Burton was leading by seven-tenths of a second. By lap 277, Burton was passed by Hamlin again.

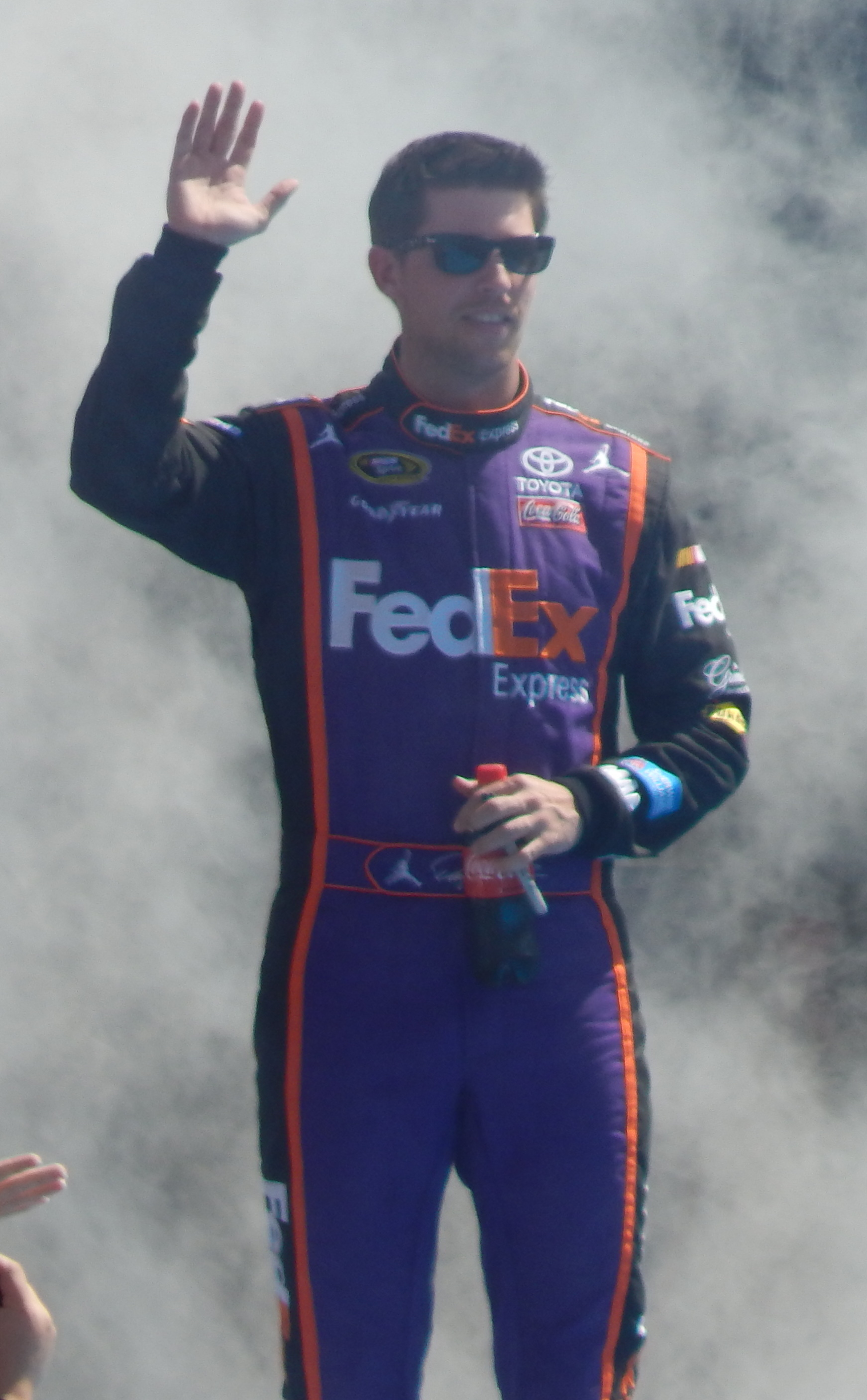
Race winner Denny Hamlin in 2015.

On lap 303, the eighth caution came out as a result of Elliott Sadler spinning in turn two. Jeff Burton led them to the next green flag on lap 310. After five laps under green, the ninth caution came out because Marcos Ambrose had a tire deflating on his car. On lap 319, the green flag waved with Burton the leader. Jeff Burton battled Denny Hamlin for several laps until Hamlin passed for the lead on lap 358. Six laps later, the tenth caution came out because David Stremme spun in turn one. Denny Hamlin kept the lead after pit stops for the leaders were finished. Hamlin led 18 laps until Burton passed him back on lap 390. He kept the lead until Hamlin passed him on lap 405.

The eleventh caution was given because Kevin Conway got into the turn four wall. All of the lead lap cars pitted; Hamlin returned to the track as the leader. The green flag came out on lap 426 with the rest of the top-five being Jeff Burton, Kyle Busch, Clint Bowyer, and Matt Kenseth. On lap 429, Jamie McMurray received a black flag because the rear panel of his car coming loose. There was a long run of sixty-six laps after the eleventh caution, but the run ended because Jeff Burton's tire deflated causing the twelfth caution of the day. Under the caution, second place Kyle Busch and leader Hamlin went to pit road which gave Jeff Gordon the lead. The green flag was given on lap 498, but with a little more than one lap to go the thirteenth caution came out because Kyle Busch got sideways as a result of racing side by side with Paul Menard and Marcos Ambrose, causing a green-white-checker. After the caution the race extended passed the scheduled distance with the green flag on lap 506. On the restart, Denny Hamlin passed Ryan Newman while he was also passing Jeff Gordon. Then Matt Kenseth, who was the leader, was passed by Hamlin after being bumped by Jeff Gordon and overdriving the corner. On the checkered flag Denny Hamlin got his third win at Martinsville and his first of the year.

== Race results ==
In conclusion, the race had 8 leaders, 26 lead changes, and 13 cautions for 79 laps. Denny Hamlin led the most laps by leading 171 of the 508 laps.

Pos	Grid	Car	Driver	Team	Make
1	19	11	Denny Hamlin	Joe Gibbs Racing	Toyota
2	17	20	Joey Logano	Joe Gibbs Racing	Toyota
3	11	24	Jeff Gordon	Hendrick Motorsports	Chevrolet
4	26	39	Ryan Newman	Stewart–Haas Racing	Chevrolet
5	20	56	Martin Truex Jr.	Michael Waltrip Racing	Toyota
6	14	83	Brian Vickers	Red Bull Racing	Toyota
7	12	33	Clint Bowyer	Richard Childress Racing	Chevrolet
8	13	99	Carl Edwards	Roush Fenway Racing	Ford
9	3	48	Jimmie Johnson	Hendrick Motorsports	Chevrolet
10	4	16	Greg Biffle	Roush Fenway Racing	Ford
11	31	47	Marcos Ambrose	JTG Daugherty Racing	Toyota
12	30	12	Brad Keselowski	Penske Racing	Dodge
13	33	77	Sam Hornish Jr.	Penske Racing	Dodge
14	9	98	Paul Menard	Richard Petty Motorsports	Ford
15	8	88	Dale Earnhardt Jr.	Hendrick Motorsports	Chevrolet
16	27	6	David Ragan	Roush Fenway Racing	Ford
17	23	9	Kasey Kahne	Richard Petty Motorsports	Ford
18	2	17	Matt Kenseth	Roush Fenway Racing	Ford
19	35	37	David Gilliland	Front Row Motorsports	Ford
20	7	31	Jeff Burton	Richard Childress Racing	Chevrolet
21	16	5	Mark Martin	Hendrick Motorsports	Chevrolet
22	10	18	Kyle Busch	Joe Gibbs Racing	Toyota
23	6	2	Kurt Busch	Penske Racing	Dodge
24	25	19	Elliott Sadler	Richard Petty Motorsports	Ford
25	39	36	Mike Bliss	Tommy Baldwin Racing	Chevrolet
26	5	14	Tony Stewart	Stewart–Haas Racing	Chevrolet
27	34	34	Travis Kvapil	Front Row Motorsports	Ford
28	24	00	David Reutimann	Michael Waltrip Racing	Toyota
29	29	71	Bobby Labonte	TRG Motorsports	Chevrolet
30	15	1	Jamie McMurray	Earnhardt Ganassi Racing	Chevrolet
31	32	38	Kevin Conway	Front Row Motorsports	Ford
32	28	78	Regan Smith	Furniture Row Racing	Chevrolet
33	18	82	Scott Speed	Red Bull Racing	Toyota
34	38	7	Robby Gordon	Robby Gordon Motorsports	Toyota
35	1	29	Kevin Harvick	Richard Childress Racing	Chevrolet
36	22	42	Juan Pablo Montoya	Earnhardt Ganassi Racing	Chevrolet
37	36	26	David Stremme	Latitude 43 Motorsports	Ford
38	21	43	A. J. Allmendinger	Richard Petty Motorsports	Ford
39	43	87	Joe Nemechek	NEMCO Motorsports	Toyota
40	40	13	Max Papis	Germain Racing	Toyota
41	37	09	Aric Almirola	Phoenix Racing	Chevrolet
42	42	66	Dave Blaney	Prism Motorsports	Toyota
43	41	55	Michael McDowell	Prism Motorsports	Toyota

Previous race: 2010 Food City 500	Sprint Cup Series; 2010 season	Next race: 2010 Subway Fresh Fit 600
