= 2010 Kobalt Tools 500 (Atlanta) =

Race details
- Race 4 of 36 in the 2010 NASCAR Sprint Cup Series
- Atlanta Motor Speedway
- Date: March 7, 2010
- Official name: Kobalt Tools 500
- Location: Atlanta Motor Speedway, Hampton, Georgia
- Course: Permanent racing facility
- Course length: 1.54 miles (2.48 km)
- Distance: 341 laps, 525.14 mi (845.13 km)
- Scheduled distance: 325 laps, 500.5 mi (805.476 km)
- Weather: Temperatures reaching up to 62.1 °F (16.7 °C); wind speeds around 8.9 miles per hour (14.3 km/h).
- Average speed: 131.297 miles per hour (211.302 km/h)

Pole position
Driver	Dale Earnhardt Jr.	Hendrick Motorsports
- Time: 28.761

Most laps led
Driver	Kasey Kahne	Richard Petty Motorsports
- Laps: 143

Winner
No. 2	Kurt Busch	Penske Racing

Television in the United States
- Network: Fox Broadcasting Company
- Announcers: Mike Joy, Darrell Waltrip, and Larry McReynolds

The 2010 Kobalt Tools 500 was a NASCAR Sprint Cup Series race held at Atlanta Motor Speedway in Hampton, Georgia on March 7, 2010. The race had 13 different leaders, 33 lead changes, and 10 cautions. During the race, Carl Edwards and Brad Keselowski collided, sending Keselowski airborne, subsequently crashing on his side door. Following his collision with Keselowski, Edwards was put under a three-race probation beginning in the 2010 Food City 500. Kurt Busch won the race, finishing ahead of Matt Kenseth and Juan Pablo Montoya, who finished second and third respectively.

== Race report ==
=== Background ===
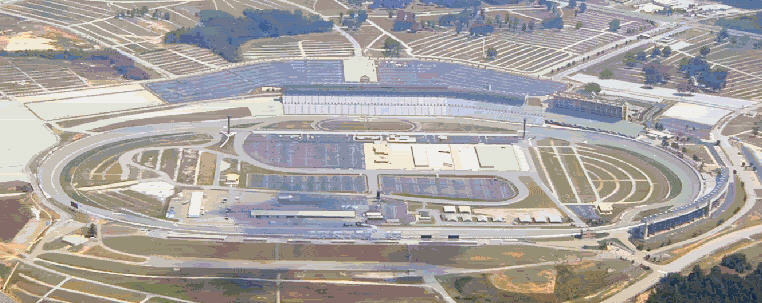
Atlanta Motor Speedway, the race track where the race was held.

Atlanta Motor Speedway is one of ten intermediate tracks to hold NASCAR-sanctioned races. The standard track at Atlanta Motor Speedway is a four-turn quad-oval track that is 1.54 miles (2.48 km) long. The track's turns are banked at twenty-four degrees, while the front stretch, the location of the finish line, and the back stretch are banked at five.

=== Practices and qualifying ===
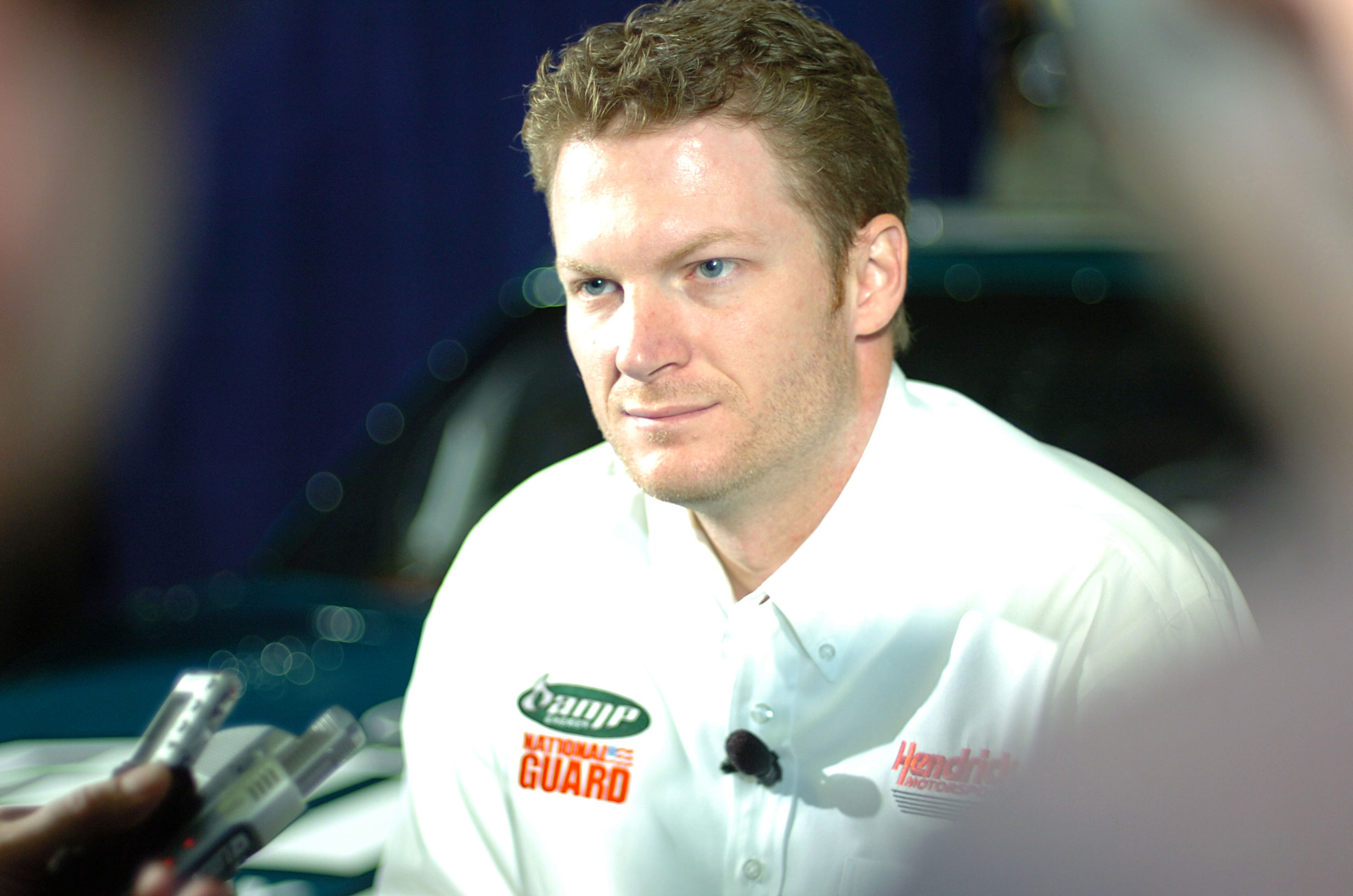
Polesitter Dale Earnhardt Jr. in 2008.

In the first round of practice, the five fastest drivers were Mark Martin, Kyle Busch, Kasey Kahne, Ryan Newman, and Juan Pablo Montoya. During qualifying, Dale Earnhardt Jr. won the pole with a lap of 28.761 seconds while Kyle Busch, Montoya, Mark Martin, and Jeff Gordon rounded out the top five. There were only three drivers, Aric Almirola, Casey Mears, and Terry Cook, who failed to qualify. In the second practice session, Jimmie Johnson, Martin, Denny Hamlin, Kurt Busch, and Kahne were the fastest. During Happy Hour (final practice), the five fastest cars were driven by Martin, Earnhardt Jr., Martin Truex Jr., Paul Menard, and David Ragan; the session had one red flag when Greg Biffle collided with the wall.

=== Race summary ===
During prerace events, Elliot Yancey gave the invocation and country singer and Tenacity recording artist Mark Wills performed the national anthem. David Vaughn Jr. gave the command to start engines.

The race began at 1:18 pm EST with Earnhardt Jr. leading the field to the green flag. After the start, Kyle Busch passed Earnhardt Jr. to take the lead. The first yellow flag came out on lap 4 due to the explosion of Robby Gordon's tire, leading Gordon to hit the wall. Gordon walked away uninjured. Kyle Busch led the field back to the green flag on the restart, but was passed by Kasey Kahne on lap 14. On lap 34, another caution was given as David Ragan's right front tire was deflating. On lap 40, Kahne led the field to the green flag; on the same lap, the third caution came out when Carl Edwards was clipped by Brad Keselowski and ran up the track to bump into Joey Logano. Also on the same lap, Kyle Busch passed Kahne to steal the lead. Busch then led the field until lap 48, when he was passed again by Kahne.

Kahne led for an additional 30 laps until the fourth yellow flag was brought out because of debris in turn four. On pit road, Kurt Busch passed Kasey Kahne by beating everyone to the line, which meant Busch would lead the field to the green flag. After a 36-lap green flag run, the fifth caution came out when Mark Martin spun out in the grass. Kurt Busch led the drivers to the green flag after the caution. On lap 148, Denny Hamlin passed Kurt Busch for the lead. Ten laps later, the sixth caution was called because Logano had a deflating tire. Hamlin maintained his lead by beating everyone off pit road, and thus led the field to the green flag on lap 164.

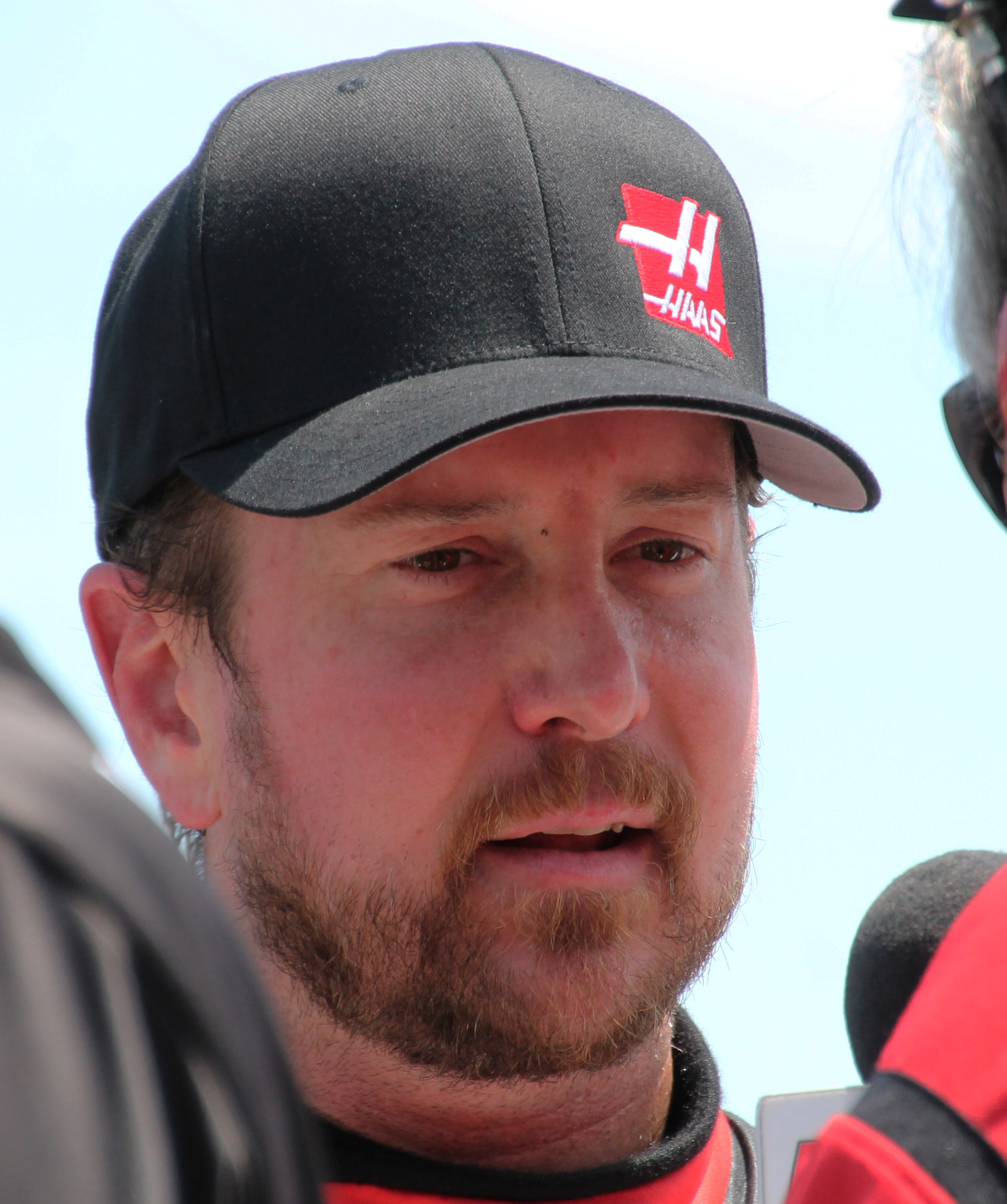
Race winner Kurt Busch (pictured in 2015)

On lap 172, Juan Pablo Montoya passed Hamlin for the lead, but his lead did not last for long as Kahne passed him three laps later. During green flag pit stops from lap 200 to lap 219, Hamlin, Jeff Burton, Bill Elliott, and Kahne all exchanged the lead, with Kahne regaining the lead after the pit stops. On lap 224, the seventh caution came out again because of debris, this time on the front stretch. Kahne again led the field to the green flag on the restart, but his lead was cut short by Kurt Busch who passed him on lap 230. After 14 laps, Kahne again led until his green flag pit stop on lap 277. After the pit stop, the leader was Kahne until lap 288, when the eighth caution came out because Hamlin blew a tire. Kurt Busch led the field to the green flag; on the same lap, the ninth caution came out as Max Papis and Elliott Sadler collided with the wall. Only a few cars pitted, and Kurt Busch led the field to the green flag on the restart.

On lap 323, Edwards, who was 150 laps down at the time, was angered enough with the previous contact with Keselowski to desire revenge. Edwards got retaliation for his incident with Keselowski a lap later by spinning him out on the front stretch. Keselowski turned airborne, barrel-rolled once (despite both roof flaps on his car deploying), and crashed on the driver's side door on the catch-fence. The crash was instantly described by NASCAR on Fox commentators Mike Joy and Darrell Waltrip as being eerily similar to the finish of the 2009 Aaron's 499 at Talladega the year before, when Keselowski turned Edwards into the catch fencing in the tri-oval on the last lap to win the race, causing Edwards to get airborne.

Keselowski hurt his leg during the crash and his pain was evident as he limped to the ambulance. After a few caution laps, Edwards was black flagged, parked for the rest of the race and ordered to the NASCAR hauler after NASCAR discovered radio communications from Edwards that he intentionally turned Keselowski. Expressing his anger, he drove backwards down pit road in defiance as he entered the garage. Edwards would later receive a three race probation for his actions.

As the crash happened with 3 laps remaining, the race was extended according to NASCAR's green–white–checkered finish policy. Clint Bowyer led the field to the green flag on lap 331; however, he did not get the white flag under green, as the eleventh caution came out for a six car crash in turn 3, which included Jamie McMurray, Bowyer, Kyle Busch, Martin, Truex Jr., and Hamlin. There was also a lead change on the same lap, with Kurt Busch passing Bowyer and Paul Menard. Kurt Busch continued to hold off Matt Kenseth to win his first race of the year. This race also marked as the longest race in Atlanta Motor Speedway history, as the race was extended to 341 laps total, surpassing the 330 laps of the previous year's Kobalt Tools 500.

== Race results ==
Pos	Car	Driver	Team	Make
1	2	Kurt Busch	Penske Racing	Dodge
2	17	Matt Kenseth	Roush Fenway Racing	Ford
3	42	Juan Pablo Montoya	Earnhardt Ganassi Racing	Chevrolet
4	9	Kasey Kahne	Richard Petty Motorsports	Ford
5	98	Paul Menard	Richard Petty Motorsports	Ford
6	43	A. J. Allmendinger	Richard Petty Motorsports	Ford
7	83	Brian Vickers	Red Bull Racing	Toyota
8	16	Greg Biffle	Roush Fenway Racing	Ford
9	29	Kevin Harvick	Richard Childress Racing	Chevrolet
10	82	Scott Speed	Red Bull Racing	Toyota
11	47	Marcos Ambrose	JTG Daugherty Racing	Toyota
12	48	Jimmie Johnson	Hendrick Motorsports	Chevrolet
13	14	Tony Stewart	Stewart–Haas Racing	Chevrolet
14	78	Regan Smith	Furniture Row Racing	Chevrolet
15	88	Dale Earnhardt Jr.	Hendrick Motorsports	Chevrolet
16	21	Bill Elliott	Wood Brothers Racing	Ford
17	39	Ryan Newman	Stewart–Haas Racing	Chevrolet
18	24	Jeff Gordon	Hendrick Motorsports	Chevrolet
19	19	Elliott Sadler	Richard Petty Motorsports	Ford
20	31	Jeff Burton	Richard Childress Racing	Chevrolet
21	11	Denny Hamlin	Joe Gibbs Racing	Toyota
22	71	Bobby Labonte	TRG Motorsports	Chevrolet
23	33	Clint Bowyer	Richard Childress Racing	Chevrolet
24	36	Mike Bliss	Tommy Baldwin Racing	Chevrolet
25	18	Kyle Busch	Joe Gibbs Racing	Toyota
26	38	David Gilliland	Front Row Motorsports	Ford
27	56	Martin Truex Jr.	Michael Waltrip Racing	Toyota
28	77	Sam Hornish Jr.	Penske Racing	Dodge
29	1	Jamie McMurray	Earnhardt Ganassi Racing	Chevrolet
30	34	Travis Kvapil	Front Row Motorsports	Ford
31	37	Kevin Conway	Front Row Motorsports	Ford
32	26	Boris Said	Latitude 43 Motorsports	Ford
33	5	Mark Martin	Hendrick Motorsports	Chevrolet
34	13	Max Papis	Germain Racing	Toyota
35	20	Joey Logano	Joe Gibbs Racing	Toyota
36	12	Brad Keselowski	Penske Racing	Dodge
37	6	David Ragan	Roush Fenway Racing	Ford
38	87	Joe Nemechek	NEMCO Motorsports	Toyota
39	99	Carl Edwards	Roush Fenway Racing	Ford
40	00	David Reutimann	Michael Waltrip Racing	Toyota
41	66	Dave Blaney	Prism Motorsports	Toyota
42	55	Michael McDowell	Prism Motorsports	Toyota
43	7	Robby Gordon	Robby Gordon Motorsports	Toyota

Previous race: 2010 Shelby American	Sprint Cup Series; 2010 season	Next race: 2010 Food City 500
