= 2010 Pepsi Max 400 =

Race details
- Race 30 of 36 in the 2010 NASCAR Sprint Cup Series
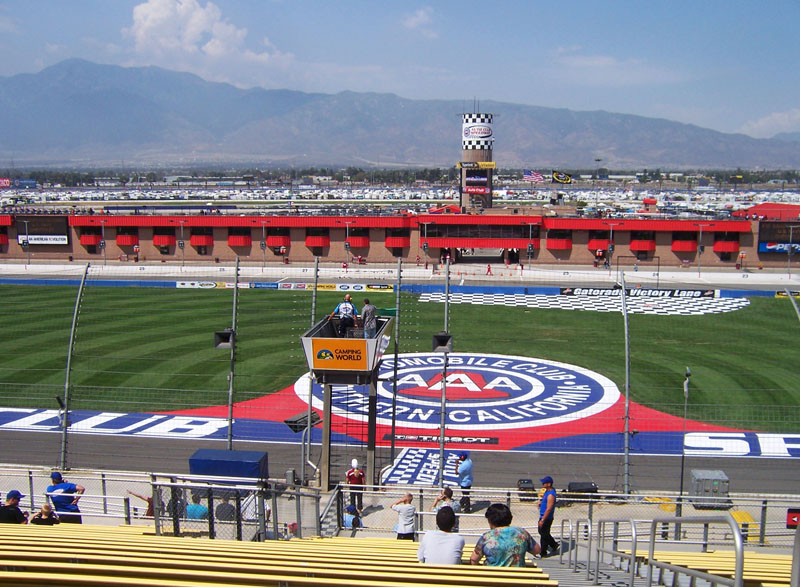
- Infield of Auto Club Speedway
- Date: October 10, 2010
- Location: Auto Club Speedway, Fontana, California
- Course: Permanent racing facility
- Course length: 2.0 miles (3.23 km)
- Distance: 200 laps, 400 mi (643.737 km)
- Weather: Sunny with a daytime high around 88; wind out of the NNE at 7 mph.
- Average speed: 131.953 miles per hour (212.358 km/h)

Pole position
Driver	Jamie McMurray	Earnhardt Ganassi Racing
- Time: 38.859

Most laps led
Driver	Mark Martin	Hendrick Motorsports
- Laps: 41

Winner
No. 14	Tony Stewart	Stewart–Haas Racing

Television in the United States
- Network: ESPN
- Announcers: Marty Reid, Dale Jarrett and Andy Petree

The 2010 Pepsi Max 400 was a NASCAR Sprint Cup Series stock car race that was held on October 10, 2010, at Auto Club Speedway in Fontana, California. Contested over 200 laps, it was the 30th race of the 2010 NASCAR Sprint Cup Series season and the fourth race in the season-ending Chase for the Sprint Cup. The race was won by Tony Stewart of the Stewart–Haas Racing team, while Clint Bowyer finished second, and Jimmie Johnson clinched third.

The Pole position driver Jamie McMurray maintained his lead on the first lap to begin the race, as Elliott Sadler, who started in the second position on the grid, maintained second behind him. Throughout the race, some of the Chase participants (such as Carl Edwards and Greg Biffle) retired due to part failures. After the final round of pit stops, Tony Stewart was the leader of the race, ahead of Johnson and Bowyer, but with less than two laps remaining, Bowyer passed Johnson to secure the second position. Stewart maintained the first position to win his second race of the season.

There were nine cautions and twenty-four lead changes among fourteen different drivers throughout the course of the race. It was Stewart's second win in the 2010 season and the thirty-ninth of his career. The result moved him up to fifth in the Drivers' Championship, one hundred seven points behind Jimmie Johnson and fifty-one ahead of Kurt Busch. Chevrolet maintained its lead in the Manufacturers' Championship, forty-one points ahead of Toyota and seventy-nine ahead of Ford, with six races remaining in the season. A total of 70,000 people attended the race, while 4.072 million watched it on television.

== Report ==
=== Background ===
Auto Club Speedway (previously California Speedway) was a superspeedway located in Fontana, California which hosted NASCAR racing annually from 1997 to 2023. The standard track at Auto Club Speedway featured four turns and was 2 miles (3.2 km) long. The track's turns were banked at fourteen degrees, while the front stretch, the location of the finish line, was banked at eleven degrees. The back stretch had three degrees of banking. The racetrack had seats for 92,100 spectators.

Before the race, Jimmie Johnson led the Drivers' Championship with 5,503 points, and Denny Hamlin stood in second with 5,495. Kevin Harvick was third in the Drivers' Championship with 5,473 points, twenty-three ahead of Carl Edwards and twenty-eight ahead of Jeff Gordon in fourth and fifth respectively. Kurt Busch (with 5,433 points) was ten points ahead of Kyle Busch, as Greg Biffle (with 5,418 points) was sixteen ahead of Jeff Burton, and forty-two in front of Tony Stewart. Matt Kenseth and Clint Bowyer were eleventh and twelfth with 5,354 and 5,251 points. In the Manufacturers' Championship, Chevrolet was leading with two hundred twelve points, thirty-seven points ahead of their rival Toyota. Ford, with one hundred thirty-five points, was nineteen points ahead of Dodge in the battle for third. Johnson was the race's defending champion.

=== Practice and qualifying ===
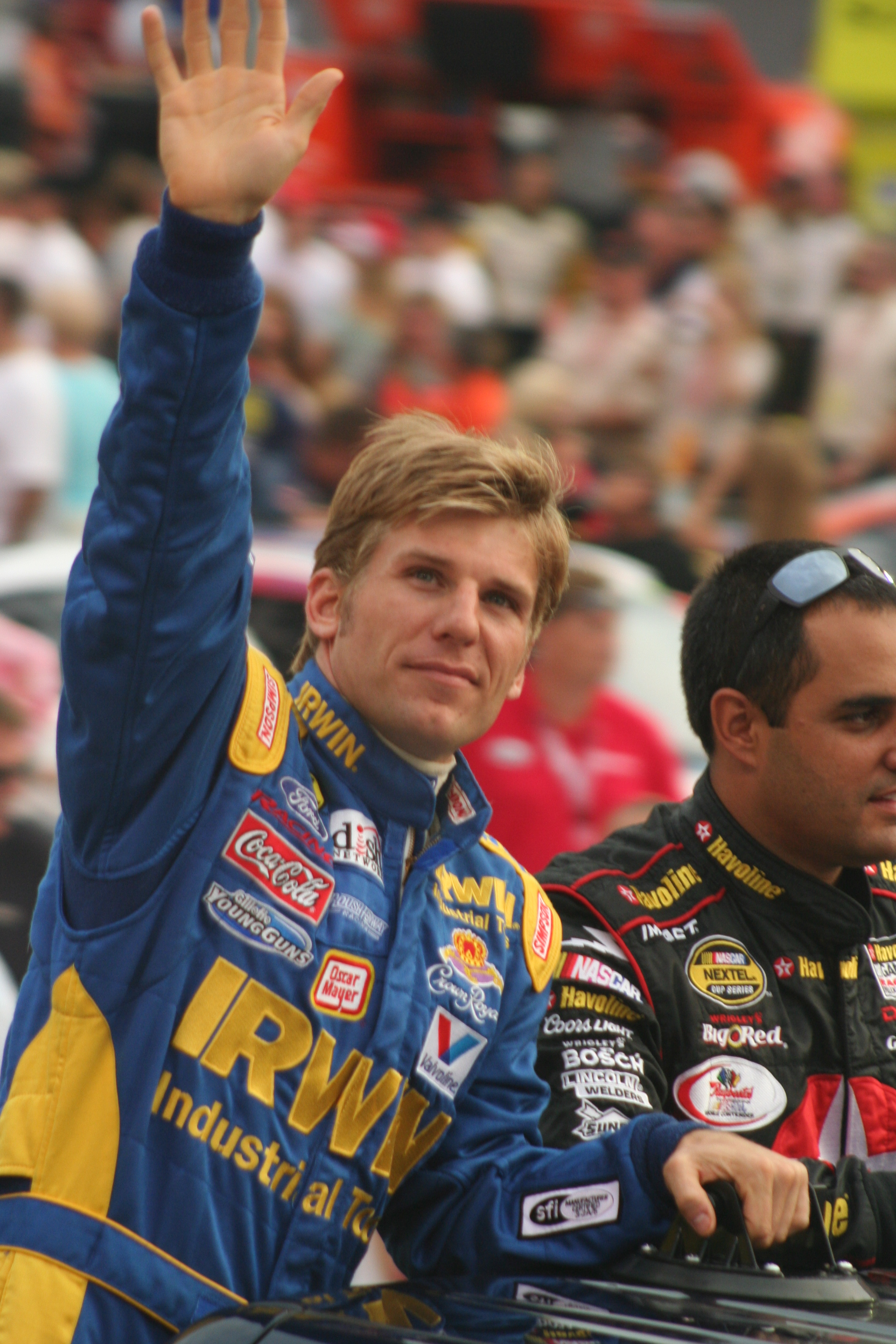
Jamie McMurray (pictured in 2007) won the pole position, after having the fastest time of 38.859 seconds.

Three practice sessions were held before the Sunday race—one on Friday, and two on Saturday. The first session has held before qualifying and lasted 90 minutes, while the second session was held after qualifying and lasted 45 minutes. The third and final session lasted 65 minutes. During the first practice session, Jamie McMurray of the Earnhardt Ganassi Racing team was quickest ahead of A. J. Allmendinger in second and Greg Biffle in the third position. Kyle Busch was scored fourth, and Mark Martin managed fifth. Juan Pablo Montoya, David Ragan, Martin Truex Jr., Jimmie Johnson, and Elliott Sadler rounded out the top ten quickest drivers in the session.

During qualifying, forty-five cars were entered; due to NASCAR's qualifying procedure, only forty-three would be allowed to race. McMurray clinched his second pole position during the 2010 season, with a time of 38.859. He was joined on the front row of the grid by Sadler. Matt Kenseth qualified third, Montoya took fourth, and Kasey Kahne started fifth. Kevin Harvick, one of the drivers in the Chase for the Sprint Cup, qualified twenty-first, while Denny Hamlin was scored thirty-fourth. The two drivers that failed to qualify for the race were Mike Bliss and Patrick Carpentier. Once qualifying concluded, McMurray stated, "I think the ECR engines have a lot of power, and you're able to show that on Friday more than even in the race, because you're really able to put the power down in qualifying. A little bit is cars, a little bit is engines, a little bit is the team putting maybe a little more focus – our guys work really hard, not necessarily on the qualifying setup, but everything that goes into qualifying, making the cars as light as you can and so many little tricks that you're able to do. Not all the teams do that to the fullest level."

On the next morning, Biffle was quickest in the second practice session, ahead of Kenseth and David Reutimann in second and third. McMurray was fourth quickest, and Jeff Gordon took fifth. Hamin, Allmendinger, Martin, Kahne, and Tony Stewart followed in the top-ten. Other drivers in the Chase, such as Johnson, was twenty-third, and Kurt Busch, who was thirty-second. During the third, and final practice session, Johnson, with a time of 40.092, was quickest. Gordon and McMurray followed in second and third with respective times of 40.098 and 40.114 seconds. Biffle managed to be fourth fastest, ahead of Harvick and Kyle Busch. Martin was scored seventh, Kahne took eighth, Hamlin was ninth, and Kenseth took tenth.

=== Race ===
The race, the 30th out of a total of 36 in the season, began at 3:00 p.m. EDT and was televised live in the United States on ESPN. Prior to the race, weather conditions were sunny with the air temperature around 81 °F (27 °C). Jeff Hammond and Motor Racing Outreach began pre-race ceremonies, by giving the invocation. Next, soft rock singer Kenny Loggins performed the national anthem, and Meg Whitman, the Republican candidate for Governor of California, gave the command for drivers to start their engines. On the pace laps, Denny Hamlin had to move to the rear of the grid because of a transmission change.

McMurray accelerated faster than Sadler off the line, getting ahead of him down the front straightaway. Kenseth took over second, as Sadler fell to fifth. Montoya passed Kenseth for second on lap 2. Sadler continued to lose positions, while Johnson passed Kahne for the fourth position, after starting eighth. Clint Bowyer gained five positions to eighth by lap 5. After starting from the rear of the grid, Hamlin had moved to 27th in six laps. On lap 7, the frontrunners included McMurray in first, ahead of Montoya, Kenseth, and Johnson. Two laps later, Montoya collided with the wall, resulting him to fall to fourth. Bowyer moved to tenth, after passing Greg Biffle on lap 10. Hamlin continued to move toward the front, passing both Kurt Busch and Carl Edwards for twenty-fifth. Kenseth took the lead ahead of McMurray, becoming the second leader of the race.

On lap 19, Johnson passed McMurray for the second position. In less than twenty laps, Kyle Busch had moved to tenth, after starting 16th. Mark Martin took over seventh, ahead of Biffle, as David Reutimann passed Joey Logano. Regan Smith gained six positions to move into thirteenth by lap 22. By lap 24, Kenseth had a one-second lead over second placer Johnson. Bowyer overtook Sadler for 4th two laps later. On lap 27, Bowyer moved into third, ahead of McMurray. On the following lap, Hamlin moved into 22nd, after beginning the race in 42nd. Jeff Gordon had been as high as fifth on the grid but after 29 laps, he fell to seventh. McMurray had fallen to that position by lap 31, after starting in the poles. On lap 33, Bobby Labonte drove to the garage for transmission repairs. Hamlin moved into twentieth, ahead of Logano one lap later. On that same lap, Martin passed Sadler for fourth. On lap 35, Gordon took over the fifth position.

Kenseth made a pit stop on lap 37, giving the lead to Johnson, who went to pit road on the following lap for four new tires. After the pit stops, Kenseth was the leader once again, ahead of Bowyer and Johnson in second and third places. On lap 40, Kenseth's lead over Bowyer was reduced to nothing, as the caution was given when Biffle's engine failed. During the caution, most of the front runners did not pit, but Hamlin, Busch, and Kevin Harvick made pit stops each for two tires. Kenseth fell to third on the restart after Gordon and Johnson both passed him. On the following lap, Johnson took over the first position after passing Gordon. On lap 49, Hamlin moved to fourth, as Kyle Busch moved into second. Brad Keselowski collided into the wall on lap 51; on the same lap, Martin moved into third.

The second caution came on lap 54, when Marcos Ambrose spun sideways in the second corner. The front runners made pit stops during the caution, but Dale Earnhardt Jr. did not which resulting in him being the leader. On the restart, Earnhardt led Johnson, Martin, and Kyle Busch, but Busch immediately passed them all to become the leader. Also on the restart, Edwards' car stalled, prompting the third caution of the race. During the caution, a safety vehicle pushed Edwards' car to the garage for repairs. Busch led Johnson on the restart but before the lap was over, Johnson reclaimed the lead. Three laps later, Gordon took over the second position after passing Busch. By lap 68, Busch had fallen three positions to fifth. On the following lap, Martin passed Gordon for the second position.

On lap 72, Edwards returned to the race, only fourteen laps down. One lap later, Martin became the leader ahead of Johnson. Kenseth moved to sixth on the seventy-fourth lap after falling to tenth earlier in the race. Tony Stewart took over the eighth position behind Ryan Newman on lap 78. Kenseth managed to pass Busch for fifth on the following lap. Harvick moved into the eighth position after he passed Newman on lap 82. Eight laps later, Earnhardt Jr. drove to pit road for tires and fuel. Meanwhile, Stewart was able to pass Kenseth for fifth. Afterward, Busch fell two positions to ninth when Harvick and Newman passed him. Hamlin and Jeff Burton made a pit stop on the following lap, two laps ahead of Stewart and Bowyer. On lap 97, the rest of the frontrunners made pit stops, giving the lead to David Gilliland. One lap later, pit stops concluded, as Martin reclaimed the lead, ahead of Johnson, Gordon, Bowyer, and Stewart. Also during the pit stops, Harvick received a drive-through penalty for speeding on pit road.

On lap 102, Truex passed Newman for the ninth position. Reutimann passed Kyle Busch for seventh two laps later. On the following lap, Gordon passed Johnson for second, while Martin had a five-second lead. Reutimann took sixth shortly after Gordon passed Johnson. Truex passed Busch for eighth on lap 110. Three laps later, Truex took over seventh, as Martin's lead of five seconds reduced to nothing when debris caused the fourth caution. During pit stops, Gordon claimed the lead, as Martin fell to sixth. The restart happened on lap 119, with Gordon as the leader. After restarting fourth, Bowyer had passed Truex and Stewart to clinch second. On lap 123, Martin had moved up three positions to third, after the recent caution. Afterward, Bowyer moved to the lead, while Martin claimed second position. Stewart passed Gordon for third on lap 131, while Hamlin took over fifth four laps later.

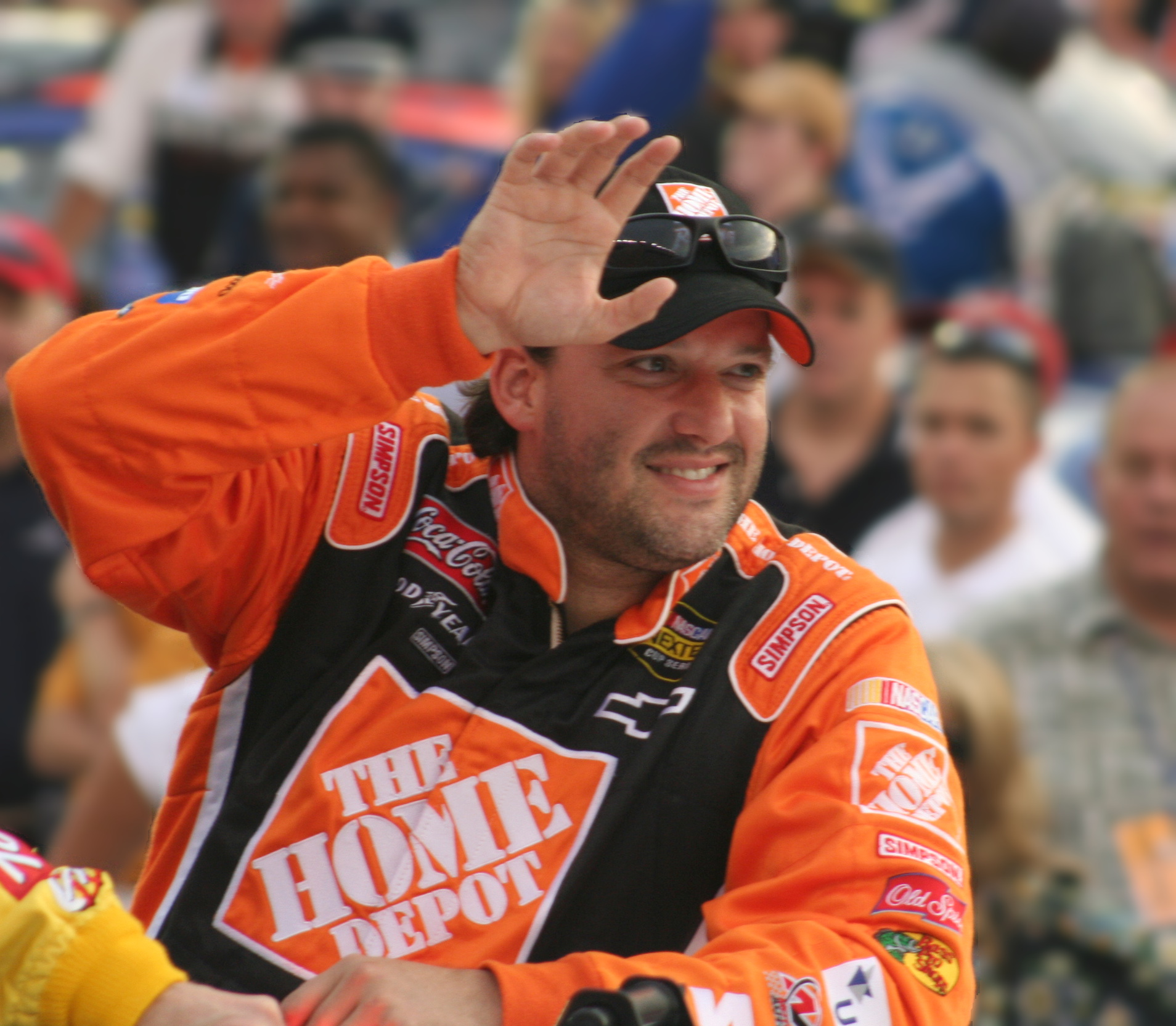
Tony Stewart (pictured in 2007) won the race earning his second victory of the season.

On lap 137, the fifth caution was given because Ambrose spun for the second time during the race. All the front runners made pit stops under the caution. Bowyer led on the restart one lap after Travis Kvapil gave up the lead to pit. Four laps after the restart, debris prompted the sixth caution of the race. The front runners did not pit during the caution, which resulted in Bowyer maintaining the lead. On lap 149, Stewart became the new leader. Five laps later, Newman took over second, as the seven caution came out after Kyle Busch's engine failed. Kvapil stayed out to lead a lap when the front runners made pit stops; Montoya became the leader after Kvapil came to pit road. On the restart, Stewart reclaimed the lead from Montoya. On the following lap, Bowyer passed Montoya for the second position two laps before Martin claimed third. Montoya continued to fall backwards, as Newman passed him for fourth. On lap 168, Bowyer reclaimed the lead.

On the two laps following the lead change, Hamlin dropped to the ninth position after Kahne and Montoya passed him. On lap 172, Johnson passed Newman for fourth and Martin claimed second. By lap 178, Bowyer had a half-second lead over second place. Three laps later, Johnson took over third after passing Stewart. On lap 183, debris prompted the eighth caution to be given. Paul Menard and Smith were the two leaders on the restart. Smith was able to become the leader one lap later but after leading one lap, Stewart reclaimed the lead. On the following lap, Kahne moved to the second position, as Bowyer clinched fourth. On lap 192, Johnson moved to second, while Smith fell to ninth after the restart. Two laps later, Kurt Busch and David Ragan collided, prompting the final caution. With two laps remaining, Stewart led on the restart ahead of Johnson and Bowyer. Stewart crossed the finish line on lap 200 to take his second win of the season, less than a second ahead of Bowyer. Johnson was third, ahead of Kahne, Newman, Martin, Harvick, and Hamlin. Jeff Gordon, who struggled to recover from a drive through penalty late in the race, took ninth on the line, ahead of Reutimann.

=== Post-race comments ===
"We're doing everything we can do. We're going to need some help, but we're doing everything we can do. I'm proud of these guys, and just so thankful ... they refuse to give up, they refuse to back down. We'll just keep doing what we're doing here."

— Stewart speaking after the race

Stewart appeared in victory lane to celebrate his second win of the season in front of 70,000 people who attended the race. Stewart also earned $262,598 in race winnings. After the race, Bowyer expressed mixed emotions after his second-place finish: "A good run was crucial for our race team after what had happened with our win, and we got that [Sunday]. But I was frustrated I didn't get a win. ... We're capable of winning races, and if we keep doing what we did [Sunday], we're going to win another one." Johnson added to his points lead with a third-place run, describing the race as a "great day overall," and saying, "We certainly wanted to be in Victory Lane, but if can finish in the top three week in and week out, you're going to have a shot."

Hamlin, who finished eighth, remained optimistic about his championship chances: "All in all, it's a decent day. Can't be too disappointed with it, especially from where we started. It's somewhat uplifting that we got out of here with a top-10 day." Smith was also pleased with his twelfth-place run after briefly holding the lead: "We had a good car early on and got back in dirty air and bad traffic. It's so tough back there. When we took the two tires, the car was really good up there. I was just lacking a little bit of grip to hold it for more than that one lap. To still maintain 12th was pretty good." All three Roush Fenway chasers, meanwhile, finished 30th or worse, damaging their position in the point standings. Biffle said his engine failed with "no indication" and added, "It's unfortunate for us. This was our opportunity to get back in the Chase and it doesn't look like it's going to happen. It's disappointing, but what can you do? It broke. Everybody is giving this program 110 percent, so you can't blame anybody. We were trying hard to win the title and it isn't going to happen this year."

The race results saw Johnson maintain his lead in the Drivers' Championship with 5,673 points. Hamlin was thirty-six points behind in second, followed by Harvick, Jeff Gordon, and Stewart. Kurt Busch was in sixth with 5,533 points, with Edwards, Burton, Kyle Busch, Biffle, Kenseth, and Bowyer rounding out the top twelve. In the Manufactures' Championship, Chevrolet maintained their lead with two hundred twenty points. Toyota followed in second with one hundred seventy-nine, while Ford and Dodge remained third and fourth with one hundred forty-one and one hundred nineteen points respectively. 4.072 million people watched the race on television.

== Results ==
=== Qualifying ===
Grid	No.	Driver	Team	Manufacturer	Time	Speed
1	1	Jamie McMurray	Earnhardt Ganassi Racing	Chevrolet	38.859	185.285
2	19	Elliott Sadler	Richard Petty Motorsports	Ford	39.044	184.407
3	17	Matt Kenseth	Roush Fenway Racing	Ford	39.110	184.096
4	42	Juan Pablo Montoya	Earnhardt Ganassi Racing	Chevrolet	39.116	184.068
5	9	Kasey Kahne	Richard Petty Motorsports	Ford	39.138	183.964
6	56	Martin Truex Jr.	Michael Waltrip Racing	Toyota	39.179	183.772
7	16	Greg Biffle	Roush Fenway Racing	Ford	39.180	183.767
8	48	Jimmie Johnson	Hendrick Motorsports	Chevrolet	39.194	183.702
9	88	Dale Earnhardt Jr.	Hendrick Motorsports	Chevrolet	39.226	183.552
10	20	Joey Logano	Joe Gibbs Racing	Toyota	39.266	183.365
11	5	Mark Martin	Hendrick Motorsports	Chevrolet	39.267	183.360
12	13	Casey Mears	Germain Racing	Toyota	39.270	183.346
13	33	Clint Bowyer	Richard Childress Racing	Chevrolet	39.286	183.271
14	39	Ryan Newman	Stewart–Haas Racing	Chevrolet	39.297	183.220
15	31	Jeff Burton	Richard Childress Racing	Chevrolet	39.299	183.211
16	18	Kyle Busch	Joe Gibbs Racing	Toyota	39.311	183.155
17	24	Jeff Gordon	Hendrick Motorsports	Chevrolet	39.332	183.057
18	6	David Ragan	Roush Fenway Racing	Ford	39.348	182.983
19	78	Regan Smith	Furniture Row Racing	Chevrolet	39.357	182.941
20	99	Carl Edwards	Roush Fenway Racing	Ford	39.365	182.904
21	29	Kevin Harvick	Richard Childress Racing	Chevrolet	39.388	182.797
22	14	Tony Stewart	Stewart–Haas Racing	Chevrolet	39.390	182.788
23	00	David Reutimann	Michael Waltrip Racing	Toyota	39.420	182.648
24	98	Paul Menard	Richard Petty Motorsports	Ford	39.446	182.528
25	12	Brad Keselowski	Penske Racing	Dodge	39.513	182.219
26	47	Marcos Ambrose	JTG Daugherty Racing	Toyota	39.541	182.089
27	83	Reed Sorenson	Red Bull Racing Team	Toyota	39.541	182.089
28	46	Michael McDowell	Whitney Motorsports	Chevrolet	39.568	181.965
29	82	Scott Speed	Red Bull Racing Team	Toyota	39.572	181.947
30	43	A. J. Allmendinger	Richard Petty Motorsports	Ford	39.580	181.910
31	36	J. J. Yeley	Tommy Baldwin Racing	Chevrolet	39.586	181.883
32	38	David Gilliland	Front Row Motorsports	Ford	39.680	181.452
33	66	Jason Leffler	Prism Motorsports	Toyota	39.686	181.424
34	11	Denny Hamlin	Joe Gibbs Racing	Toyota	39.721	181.264
35	87	Joe Nemechek	NEMCO Motorsports	Toyota	39.736	181.196
36	64	Landon Cassill	Gunselman Motorsports	Toyota	39.776	181.014
37	77	Sam Hornish Jr.	Penske Racing	Dodge	39.825	180.791
38	2	Kurt Busch	Penske Racing	Dodge	39.869	180.591
39	37	Dave Blaney	Front Row Motorsports	Ford	40.099	179.556
40	34	Travis Kvapil	Front Row Motorsports	Ford	40.432	178.077
41	7	Kevin Conway	Robby Gordon Motorsports	Toyota	40.627	177.222
42	71	Andy Lally	TRG Motorsports	Chevrolet	40.643	177.152
43	09	Bobby Labonte	Phoenix Racing	Chevrolet	Champion's Provisional	
Failed to qualify
44	55	Mike Bliss	Prism Motorsports	Toyota	39.856	180.650
45	26	Patrick Carpentier	Latitude 43 Motorsports	Ford	40.055	179.753

=== Race results ===
Pos	Grid	No.	Driver	Team	Manufacturer	Laps	Points
1	22	14	Tony Stewart	Stewart–Haas Racing	Chevrolet	200	190^{1}
2	13	33	Clint Bowyer	Richard Childress Racing	Chevrolet	200	175^{1}
3	8	48	Jimmie Johnson	Hendrick Motorsports	Chevrolet	200	170^{1}
4	5	9	Kasey Kahne	Richard Petty Motorsports	Ford	200	160
5	14	39	Ryan Newman	Stewart–Haas Racing	Chevrolet	200	155
6	11	5	Mark Martin	Hendrick Motorsports	Chevrolet	200	160^{2}
7	21	29	Kevin Harvick	Richard Childress Racing	Chevrolet	200	146
8	34	11	Denny Hamlin	Joe Gibbs Racing	Toyota	200	142
9	17	24	Jeff Gordon	Hendrick Motorsports	Chevrolet	200	143^{1}
10	23	00	David Reutimann	Michael Waltrip Racing	Toyota	200	134
11	10	20	Joey Logano	Joe Gibbs Racing	Toyota	200	130
12	19	78	Regan Smith	Furniture Row Racing	Chevrolet	200	132^{1}
13	2	19	Elliott Sadler	Richard Petty Motorsports	Ford	200	124
14	4	42	Juan Pablo Montoya	Earnhardt Ganassi Racing	Chevrolet	200	126^{1}
15	37	77	Sam Hornish Jr.	Penske Racing	Dodge	200	118
16	9	88	Dale Earnhardt Jr.	Hendrick Motorsports	Chevrolet	200	120^{1}
17	1	1	Jamie McMurray	Earnhardt Ganassi Racing	Chevrolet	200	117^{1}
18	6	56	Martin Truex Jr.	Michael Waltrip Racing	Toyota	200	109
19	30	43	A. J. Allmendinger	Richard Petty Motorsports	Ford	200	106
20	32	38	David Gilliland	Front Row Motorsports	Ford	200	108^{1}
21	38	2	Kurt Busch	Penske Racing	Dodge	200	100
22	24	98	Paul Menard	Richard Petty Motorsports	Ford	200	102^{1}
23	15	31	Jeff Burton	Richard Childress Racing	Chevrolet	200	94
24	29	82	Scott Speed	Red Bull Racing Team	Toyota	200	91
25	12	13	Casey Mears	Germain Racing	Toyota	200	88
26	25	12	Brad Keselowski	Penske Racing	Dodge	200	85
27	27	83	Reed Sorenson	Red Bull Racing Team	Toyota	200	82
28	40	34	Travis Kvapil	Front Row Motorsports	Ford	200	84^{1}
29	39	37	Dave Blaney	Front Row Motorsports	Ford	200	76
30	3	17	Matt Kenseth	Roush Fenway Racing	Ford	200	78^{1}
31	41	7	Kevin Conway	Robby Gordon Motorsports	Toyota	197	70
32	18	6	David Ragan	Roush Fenway Racing	Ford	193	67
33	26	47	Marcos Ambrose	JTG Daugherty Racing	Toyota	193	64
34	20	99	Carl Edwards	Roush Fenway Racing	Ford	187	61
35	16	18	Kyle Busch	Joe Gibbs Racing	Toyota	155	63^{1}
36	42	71	Andy Lally	TRG Motorsports	Chevrolet	76	55
37	35	87	Joe Nemechek	NEMCO Motorsports	Toyota	69	52
38	43	09	Bobby Labonte	Phoenix Racing	Chevrolet	56	49
39	28	46	Michael McDowell	Whitney Motorsports	Chevrolet	55	46
40	36	64	Landon Cassill	Gunselman Motorsports	Toyota	43	43
41	7	16	Greg Biffle	Roush Fenway Racing	Ford	40	40
42	31	36	J. J. Yeley	Tommy Baldwin Racing	Chevrolet	33	37
43	33	66	Jason Leffler	Prism Motorsports	Toyota	23	34
^{1} Includes five bonus points for leading a lap
^{2} Includes ten bonus points for leading the most laps

== Standings after the race ==
Drivers' Championship standings
Rank	Driver	Points
1	Jimmie Johnson	5,673
2	Denny Hamlin	5,637
3	Kevin Harvick	5,619
4	Jeff Gordon	5,588
5	Tony Stewart	5,566
6	Kurt Busch	5,533
7	Carl Edwards	5,511
8	Jeff Burton	5,496
9	Kyle Busch	5,486
10	Greg Biffle	5,458
11	Matt Kenseth	5,432
12	Clint Bowyer	5,426

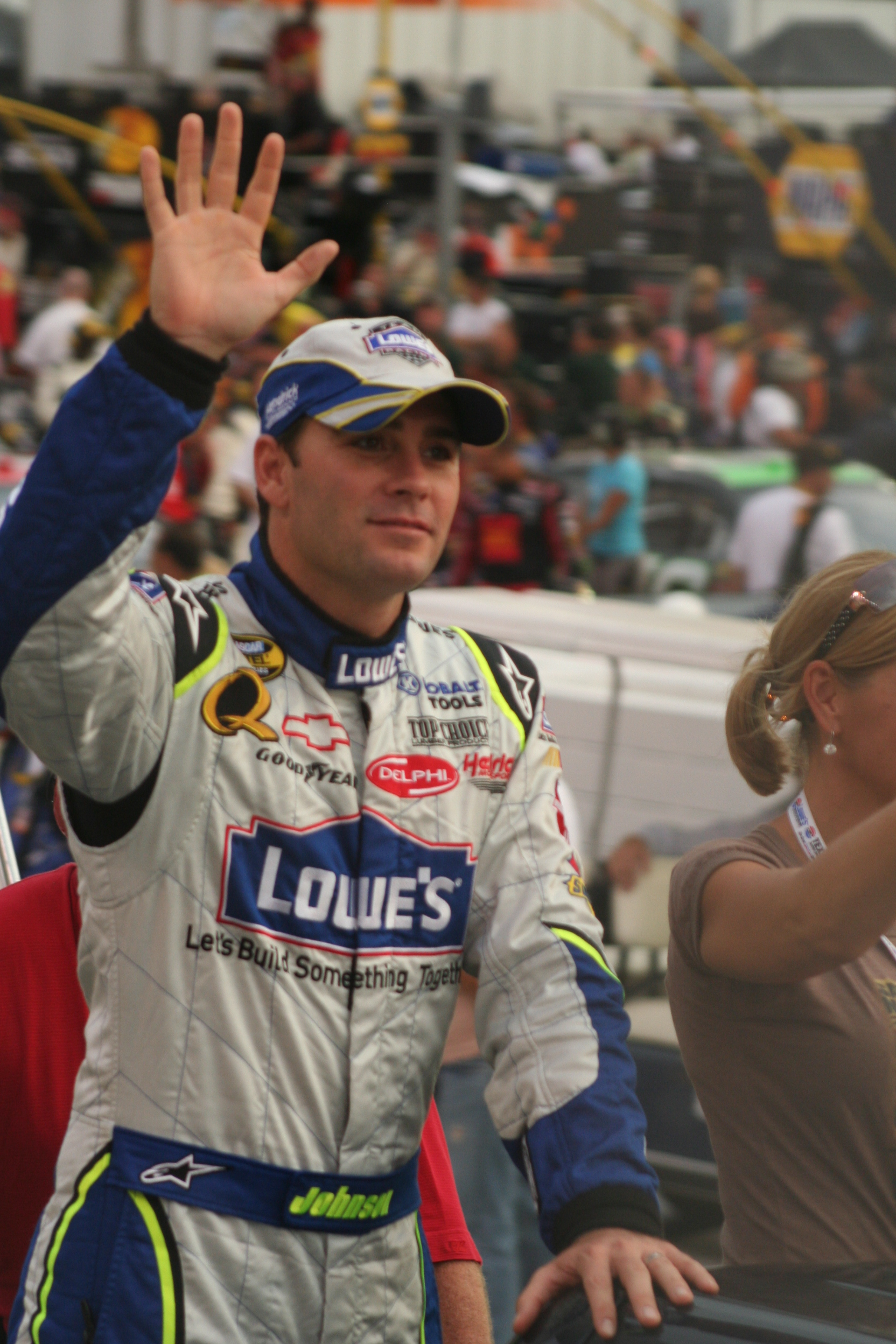
Jimmie Johnson (pictured in 2007) remained the points leader after finishing third in the race.

Manufacturers' Championship standings
Rank	Manufacturer	Points
1	Chevrolet	220
2	Toyota	179
3	Ford	141
4	Dodge	119

- Note: Only the top twelve positions are included for the driver standings. These drivers qualified for the Chase for the Sprint Cup.

Previous race: 2010 Price Chopper 400	Sprint Cup Series; 2010 season	Next race: 2010 Bank of America 500
