= Motor racing (disambiguation) =

Motor racing describes various forms of motor-powered racing:

- Auto racing
- Motorboat racing
- Motorcycle racing
- Kart racing
- Truck racing

Motor racing may also refer to:

- Motor Racing Developments
- Motor Racing Network
- Motor Racing Outreach
