= Kevin Conway (racing driver) =

American racing driver (born 1979)

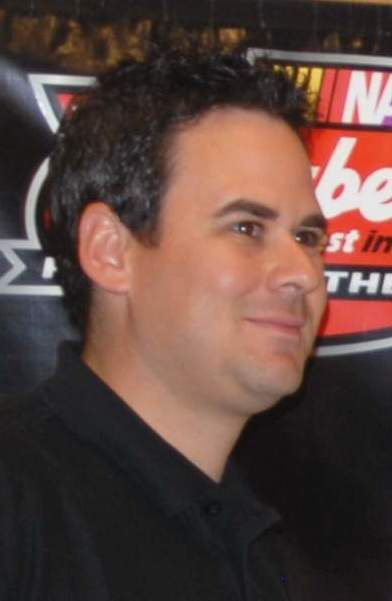
- Conway in 2010
- Born: April 15, 1979 (age 47); Cornelius, North Carolina, U.S.
- Awards: 2010 NASCAR Sprint Cup Series Rookie of the Year

NASCAR Cup Series career
- 31 races run over 2 years
- Best finish: 35th (2010)
- First race: 2010 Auto Club 500 (Fontana)
- Last race: 2011 Good Sam Roadside Assistance 500 (Talladega)
Wins	Top tens	Poles
0	0	0

NASCAR O'Reilly Auto Parts Series career
- 34 races run over 6 years
- Best finish: 36th (2011)
- First race: 2003 Aaron's 312 (Atlanta)
- Last race: 2011 Ford 300 (Homestead)
Wins	Top tens	Poles
0	0	0

NASCAR FedEx Freight Truck Series career
- 1 race run over 1 year
- Best finish: 86th (2009)
- First race: 2009 Lucas Oil 150 (Phoenix)
Wins	Top tens	Poles
0	0	0

ARCA Menards Series career
- 2 races run over 1 year
- Best finish: 80th (2002)
- First race: 2002 Pork, The Other White Meat 400 (Atlanta)
- Last race: 2002 EasyCare Vehicle Service Contracts 100 (Charlotte)
Wins	Top tens	Poles
0	1	0
- Statistics up to date as of August 16, 2025.

Kevin Conway (born April 15, 1979) is an American professional stock car racing driver who currently races in the Blancpain Super Trofeo Championship. He is the 2010 NASCAR Sprint Cup Series Rookie of the Year (ROTY), 2014 Super Trofeo World Champion, and two-time North American Super Trofeo Series Champion. Conway has raced in motocross, legends, the World Karting Association, United States Automobile Club (USAC), American Speed Association (ASA), NASCAR's regional K&N Pro Series West, and all three of NASCAR's national touring series.

A protege of Cup Series winner Ernie Irvan and longtime test driver for Cup teams, Conway is best known for his association with the male enhancement product ExtenZe from 2009 to 2011. The sponsorship led ultimately to Conway's first full-time NASCAR season and ROTY effort in 2010, but also led to lawsuits from former teams due to unpaid sponsorship funds. Conway appeared on Shark Tank in 2021 as a business partner for the company "Phoozy", which made specialized smartphone cases.

== Racing career ==
=== Early career ===
Conway began his career racing at age six, running AMA motocross, go-karts, and winged midget cars. Moving to Charlotte, North Carolina as a teenager, Conway became the youngest legends car national champion in 1994, at the age of fifteen. Conway would later race late model stock cars in NASCAR's regional Dodge Weekly Racing Series.

=== 2002–2005 ===
Conway moved to major-league stock car racing in 2002, when he made his debut in the ARCA RE/MAX Series. His first race came in the No. 17 Eagle One/Valvoline Chevrolet for A. J. Henriksen, Ernie Irvan, and George deBidart at Atlanta Motor Speedway, where he started fifth and finished thirteenth after a rear axle problem late in the race. In his next race that fall at Lowe's he finished seventh. Conway also served as a test driver for NASCAR Winston Cup Series team MB2 Motorsports.

In 2003, Conway made his NASCAR Busch Series debut at Atlanta in the No. 22 for Bost Racing, qualifying 27th and finishing 33rd. In 2004 he made his career debut in the Winston West Series at Fontana in the No. 28 Ford owned by Ernie Irvan, racing against Cup Series regular Ken Schrader and future Cup drivers Clint Bowyer and David Gilliland. Conway qualified and finished fifth after leading much of the race. Conway attempted three Busch Series races in 2004, failing to qualify for all three. In 2005, Conway signed to run the No. 03 Chevrolet for Gary Keller and Mark Smith, but failed to qualify for the first two races of the season. He made his only start of the season at Darlington Raceway in the No. 43 Channellock/Supra Boats Dodge for the Curb Agajanian Performance Group, where he finished 29th.

=== 2006 ===
In 2006, Conway declared for Busch Series Rookie of the Year honors, driving the No. 58 Carver Racing Dodge, which was in the process of purchasing equipment from Glynn Motorsports. After the team switched to the No. 40 for Richmond, the team suspended operations, leaving Conway out of a ride after four starts. He competed in the West Series once again at Irwindale Speedway for James Pritchard, where he finished eighth.

=== 2007 ===
In 2007, Conway joined Joe Gibbs Racing's Busch program, signing on for eight races in the team's No. 18 Chevrolet. Conway brought sponsorship from Z-Line Designs, who partnered with him on the recommendation of former driver Lake Speed, and shared the ride with drivers Tony Stewart, Brad Coleman and Aric Almirola. Conway struggled in the ride, having an average finish of 29.4, nine positions worse than his teammates in the same ride. He was released at the end of the 2007 season, though Z-Line would continue to sponsor JGR.

=== 2009: Various Cup/Nationwide teams ===
After spending the 2008 season out of NASCAR, Conway returned in 2009 with sponsorship from his male enhancement product ExtenZe. He began racing midway through the season in the No. 87 for Braun Racing (using the No. 87 owners points from NEMCO Motorsports), and had a career-best fifteenth-place finish at Kentucky Speedway. He also ran a race for R3 Motorsports and later K Automotive Racing to finish out the Nationwide season. He made his first Camping World Truck Series race at Phoenix, finishing nineteenth in Rob Fuller's truck, as well as an unsuccessful attempt to qualify for a Sprint Cup race in the No. 70 TRG Motorsports Chevy.

=== 2010 ===
==== Front Row Motorsports ====
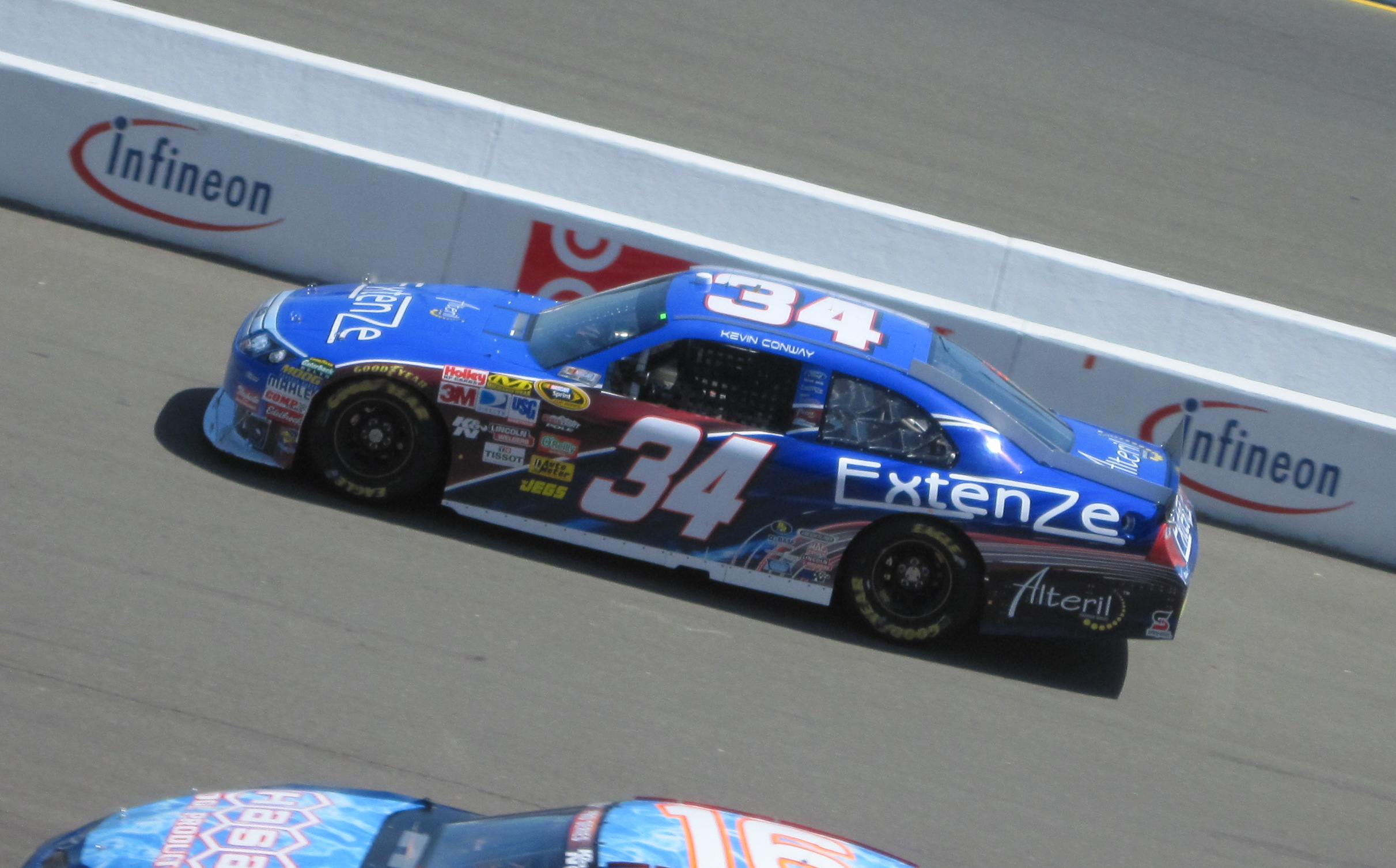
Conway's No. 34 Sprint Cup Series car during the 2010 Toyota/Save Mart 350

Initially planning to run full-time in the Nationwide Series, in 2010 Conway signed to drive the No. 37 ExtenZe Ford in the Sprint Cup Series for Front Row Motorsports as a teammate to Travis Kvapil and David Gilliland. Conway's lack of superspeedway experience caused him to delay his Rookie of the Year campaign, as NASCAR would not give him approval to compete in the Daytona 500. Kvapil raced the 37 at Daytona, while John Andretti ran Kvapil's 34 car. Conway earned a career best finish of 14th at Daytona International Speedway in July, one of only three finishes better than thirtieth in 2010. As the only fully sponsored driver in the Front Row stable, he rotated among the team's No. 34, No. 37, and No. 38 cars in order to remain in a Top 35-ranked car that would guarantee a starting spot. Prior to the August race at Michigan, Conway and the ExtenZe sponsor logos were removed from the car, with Tony Raines replacing him. Conway and ExtenZe would go on to be sued by Front Row Motorsports for lack of payment, which they cited as the reason Conway was removed from the car.

==== Robby Gordon Motorsports ====
Conway returned to competition with Robby Gordon Motorsports at Bristol, and ran seven races in the No. 7 car, as well as attempting one in the teams No. 07 car, missing the race at Charlotte. Owner Robby Gordon would also get into a sponsorship dispute with Conway and Extenze, which turned violent the next season.

Conway won the NASCAR Rookie of the Year award for 2010 by default, as his only competitor, Terry Cook, ran only three of the first ten races during the year. It was the least competitive rookie of the year battle in modern NASCAR history up to that point. Conway ran 28 races in 2010.

=== 2011 ===
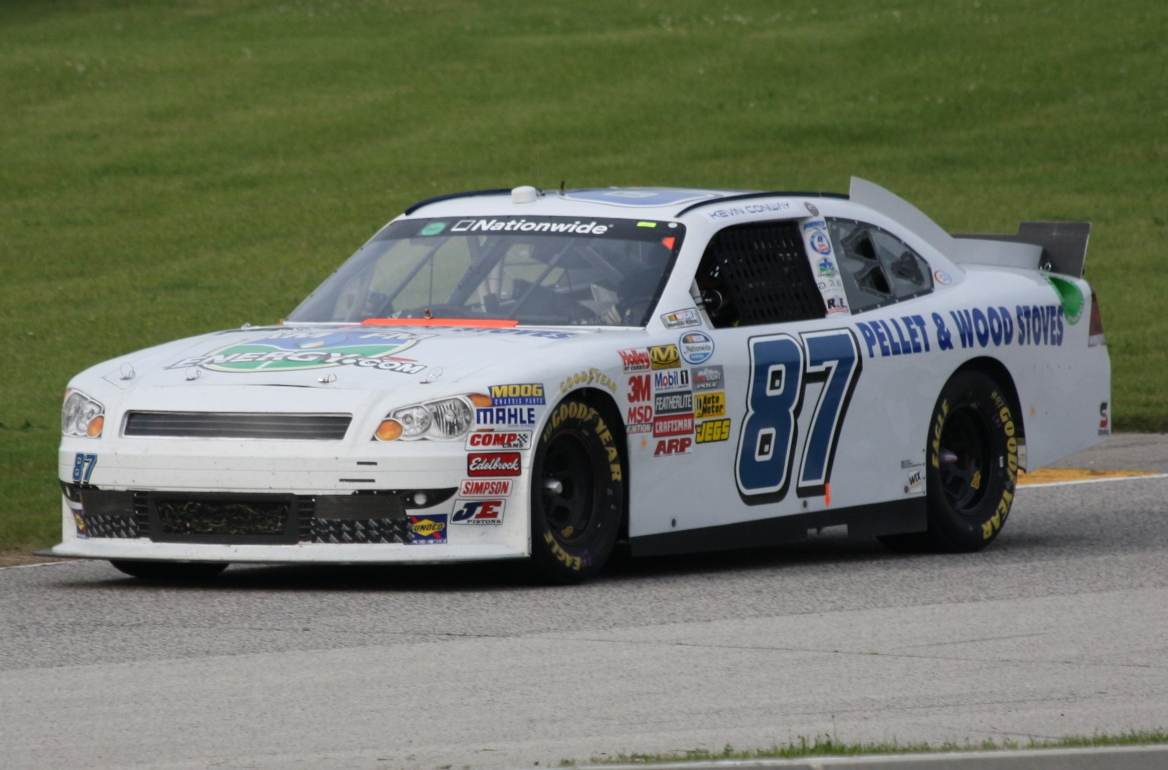
Conway at Road America 2011

For 2011, it was announced that Conway would enter the Budweiser Shootout (eligible due to winning Rookie of the Year in 2010), Daytona 500, and possibly a few more races for Joe Nemechek and NEMCO Motorsports in the No. 97 Toyota with sponsorship from ExtenZe. Conway attempted four races, qualifying for three of them, in which he finished last in each.

Conway also ran nine races in the Nationwide Series for NEMCO, with an average finish of 28.1. He was released from NEMCO at the end of the season and has not competed in NASCAR since.

=== 2013 ===
In 2013 Conway competed in the North American Lamborghini Blancpain Super Trofeo Series. Over the course of the season he drove a race prepared, lightweight, four-wheel-drive, 570 horsepower version of the Lamborghini Gallardo LP 570-4 to win the series championship in the Pro-Am division. The final Super Trofeo Series race weekend was held in conjunction with the IndyCar season finale race weekend at Auto Club Speedway in Fontana, CA.

== Personal life ==
A native of Lynchburg, Virginia, Conway earned a marketing degree at the University of North Carolina at Charlotte. Conway started the marketing company Exclaim Racing, which organized his sponsorship deals. He also served as an instructor at the Richard Petty Driving Experience. Conway's father Sam was a former team manager for Darrell Waltrip Motorsports, and a board member for Motor Racing Outreach. Sam died from lung cancer in 2007 at age 58.

== Motorsports career results ==
=== NASCAR ===
(key) (Bold – Pole position awarded by qualifying time. Italics – Pole position earned by points standings or practice time. * – Most laps led.)

==== Sprint Cup Series ====
NASCAR Sprint Cup Series results
Year	Team	No.	Make	1	2	3	4	5	6	7	8	9	10	11	12	13	14	15	16	17	18	19	20	21	22	23	24	25	26	27	28	29	30	31	32	33	34	35	36	NSCC	Pts	Ref
2009	TRG Motorsports	70	Chevy	DAY	CAL	LVS	ATL	BRI	MAR	TEX	PHO	TAL	RCH	DAR	CLT	DOV	POC	MCH	SON	NHA	DAY	CHI	IND	POC	GLN	MCH	BRI	ATL	RCH	NHA	DOV	KAN	CAL	CLT	MAR	TAL	TEX	PHO; DNQ	HOM	NA	-	
2010	Front Row Motorsports	37	Ford	DAY	CAL; 31	LVS; 36	ATL; 31	BRI; 28						DAR; 33	DOV; 30																									35th	1830	
2010	Front Row Motorsports	38	Ford						MAR; 31	PHO; 33	TEX; 27	TAL; 30	RCH; 37																											35th	1830	
2010	Front Row Motorsports	34	Ford													CLT; 35	POC; 35	MCH; 40	SON; 28	NHA; 23	DAY; 14	CHI; 33	IND; 34	POC; 31	GLN; 31	MCH														35th	1830	
2010	Robby Gordon Motorsports	7	Toyota																								BRI; 36	ATL; 37	RCH; 41	NHA	DOV; 37	KAN; 38	CAL; 31		MAR; QL^{†}	TAL	TEX	PHO	HOM; 30	35th	1830	
2010	Robby Gordon Motorsports	07	Toyota																															CLT; DNQ						35th	1830	
2011	NEMCO Motorsports	97	Toyota	DAY; DNQ	PHO	LVS	BRI	CAL	MAR	TEX	TAL; 43	RCH	DAR	DOV	CLT	KAN	POC	MCH	SON	DAY; 43	KEN	NHA	IND	POC	GLN	MCH	BRI	ATL	RCH	CHI	NHA	DOV	KAN	CLT	TAL; 43	MAR	TEX	PHO	HOM	79th	0	
^{†} - Qualified but replaced by Robby Gordon

===== Daytona 500 =====
Year	Team	Manufacturer	Start	Finish
2011	NEMCO Motorsports	Toyota	DNQ	

==== Nationwide Series ====
NASCAR Nationwide Series results
Year	Team	No.	Make	1	2	3	4	5	6	7	8	9	10	11	12	13	14	15	16	17	18	19	20	21	22	23	24	25	26	27	28	29	30	31	32	33	34	35	NNSC	Pts	Ref
2003	Bost Motorsports	22	Chevy	DAY	CAR	LVS	DAR	BRI	TEX	TAL	NSH	CAL	RCH	GTY	NZH	CLT	DOV	NSH	KEN	MLW	DAY	CHI	NHA	PPR	IRP	MCH	BRI	DAR	RCH	DOV	KAN	CLT	MEM	ATL; 33	PHO	CAR	HOM		139th	64	
2004	Rick Ware Racing	51	Dodge	DAY; DNQ	CAR	LVS	DAR	BRI	TEX	NSH	TAL	CAL	GTY	RCH	NZH	CLT	DOV	NSH	KEN	MLW	DAY																		NA	-	
2004	Mac Hill Motorsports	56	Chevy																			CHI; DNQ	NHA	PPR	IRP	MCH	BRI	CAL	RCH	DOV	KAN	CLT	MEM						NA	-	
2004	Smith Brothers Motorsports	67	Chevy																															ATL; DNQ	PHO	DAR	HOM		NA	-	
2005	Gary Keller Motorsports	03	Chevy	DAY; DNQ	CAL; DNQ	MXC	LVS	ATL	NSH	BRI	TEX	PHO	TAL																										122nd	76	
2005	Curb Racing	43	Chevy											DAR; 29	RCH	CLT	DOV	NSH	KEN	MLW	DAY	CHI	NHA	PPR	GTY	IRP	GLN	MCH	BRI	CAL	RCH	DOV	KAN	CLT	MEM	TEX	PHO	HOM	122nd	76	
2006	Carver Racing	58	Dodge	DAY	CAL	MXC	LVS; 28	ATL; 34	BRI; 43	TEX	NSH	PHO	TAL																										86th	253	
2006	Carver Racing	40	Dodge											RCH; DNQ	DAR; 28	CLT; DNQ	DOV	NSH	KEN	MLW	DAY	CHI	NHA	MAR	GTY	IRP	GLN	MCH	BRI	CAL	RCH	DOV	KAN	CLT	MEM	TEX	PHO	HOM	86th	253	
2007	Joe Gibbs Racing	18	Chevy	DAY	CAL	MXC	LVS	ATL	BRI; 26	NSH	TEX	PHO	TAL	RCH	DAR	CLT	DOV; 30	NSH; 31	KEN	MLW	NHA; 21	DAY	CHI	GTY	IRP	CGV	GLN	MCH	BRI	CAL; 20	RCH; 43	DOV	KAN; 35	CLT	MEM	TEX	PHO	HOM	71st	523	
2009	NEMCO Motorsports	87	Toyota	DAY	CAL	LVS	BRI	TEX	NSH	PHO	TAL	RCH	DAR	CLT	DOV; 24	NSH; 23	KEN; 15	MLW	NHA	DAY	CHI	GTY; 28	IRP; 20	IOW	GLN	MCH	BRI	CGV	ATL	RCH	DOV								45th	1149	
2009	R3 Motorsports	26	Chevy																													KAN; 24		CLT; 24	MEM; 27	TEX; 20	PHO; 24	HOM; 22	45th	1149	
2009	R3 Motorsports	23	Chevy																														CAL; 18						45th	1149	
2011	NEMCO Motorsports	87	Chevy	DAY	PHO	LVS; 43	BRI																																36th	120	
2011	NEMCO Motorsports	87	Toyota					CAL; 22	TEX	TAL	NSH; 24	RCH	DAR	DOV	IOW	CLT	CHI	MCH	ROA; 24	DAY; 25	KEN	NHA	NSH	IRP	IOW	GLN	CGV; QL^{†}	BRI; 29	ATL	RCH	CHI; 24	DOV	KAN	CLT; 36	TEX	PHO	HOM; 26		36th	120	
^{†} - Qualified for Joe Nemechek·

==== Camping World Truck Series ====
NASCAR Camping World Truck Series results
Year	Team	No.	Make	1	2	3	4	5	6	7	8	9	10	11	12	13	14	15	16	17	18	19	20	21	22	23	24	25	NCWTC	Pts	Ref
2009	Rob Fuller Motorsports	71	Chevy	DAY	CAL	ATL	MAR	KAN	CLT	DOV	TEX	MCH	MLW	MEM	KEN	IRP	NSH	BRI	CHI	IOW	GTW	NHA	LVS; 31	MAR	TAL	TEX	PHO	HOM	86th	106	

=== ARCA Re/Max Series ===
(key) (Bold – Pole position awarded by qualifying time. Italics – Pole position earned by points standings or practice time. * – Most laps led.)

ARCA Re/Max Series results
Year	Team	No.	Make	1	2	3	4	5	6	7	8	9	10	11	12	13	14	15	16	17	18	19	20	21	22	ARSC	Pts
2002	Arne Henriksen	17	Chevy	DAY	ATL; 13	NSH	SLM	KEN	CLT	KAN	POC	MCH	TOL	SBO	KEN	BLN	POC	NSH	ISF	WIN	DSF	CHI	SLM	TAL	CLT; 7	80th	365

=== Complete WeatherTech SportsCar Championship results ===
(key) (Races in bold indicate pole position; results in italics indicate fastest lap)

Year	Team	Class	Make	Engine	1	2	3	4	5	6	7	Pos.	Points
2023	Ave Motorsports	LMP3	Ligier JS P320	Nissan VK56DE 5.6 L V8	DAY	SEB	WGL	MOS	ELK	IMS; 22	PET	33rd	264

Achievements
Preceded by Joey Logano	NASCAR Sprint Cup Series Rookie of the Year; 2010	Succeeded by Andy Lally
