= 2010 Gillette Fusion ProGlide 500 =

2010 Gillette Fusion ProGlide 500 Presented by Target
Race details
- Race 14 of 36 in the 2010 NASCAR Sprint Cup Series
- Date: June 6, 2010
- Official name: Gillette Fusion ProGlide 500
- Location: Pocono Raceway Long Pond, Pennsylvania
- Course: Permanent racing facility
- Course length: 2.5 miles (4.0 km)
- Distance: 204 laps, 510 mi (821 km)
- Weather: Scattered thunderstorms with a high around 76; wind out of the WSW at 7 mph. Chance of precipitation 40%.
- Average speed: 130 miles per hour (210 km/h)

Pole position
Driver	Kyle Busch	Joe Gibbs Racing
- Time: 53.10

Most laps led
Driver	Denny Hamlin	Joe Gibbs Racing
- Laps: 88

Winner
No. 11	Denny Hamlin	Joe Gibbs Racing

Television in the United States
- Network: Turner Network Television
- Announcers: Adam Alexander, Wally Dallenbach Jr., Kyle Petty

The 2010 Gillette Fusion ProGlide 500 Presented by Target was a NASCAR Sprint Cup Series race that was held on June 6, 2010 at Pocono Raceway in Long Pond, Pennsylvania. It was the 14th race of the 2010 NASCAR Sprint Cup Series season. The event was scheduled to begin at 1 p.m. EDT on TNT, but it was delayed by rain to 3:00 p.m. It was also broadcast on the radio station Motor Racing Network at 12 p.m. EDT. The race consisted of 200 laps, 500 miles (804.67 km).

The race began with Kyle Busch from Joe Gibbs Racing on the pole. Throughout the race there were seven different leaders, 14 lead changes, and eight cautions. Denny Hamlin, also from Joe Gibbs Racing, won the 2010 Gillette Fusion ProGlide 500.

== Race report ==
=== Practice and qualifying ===
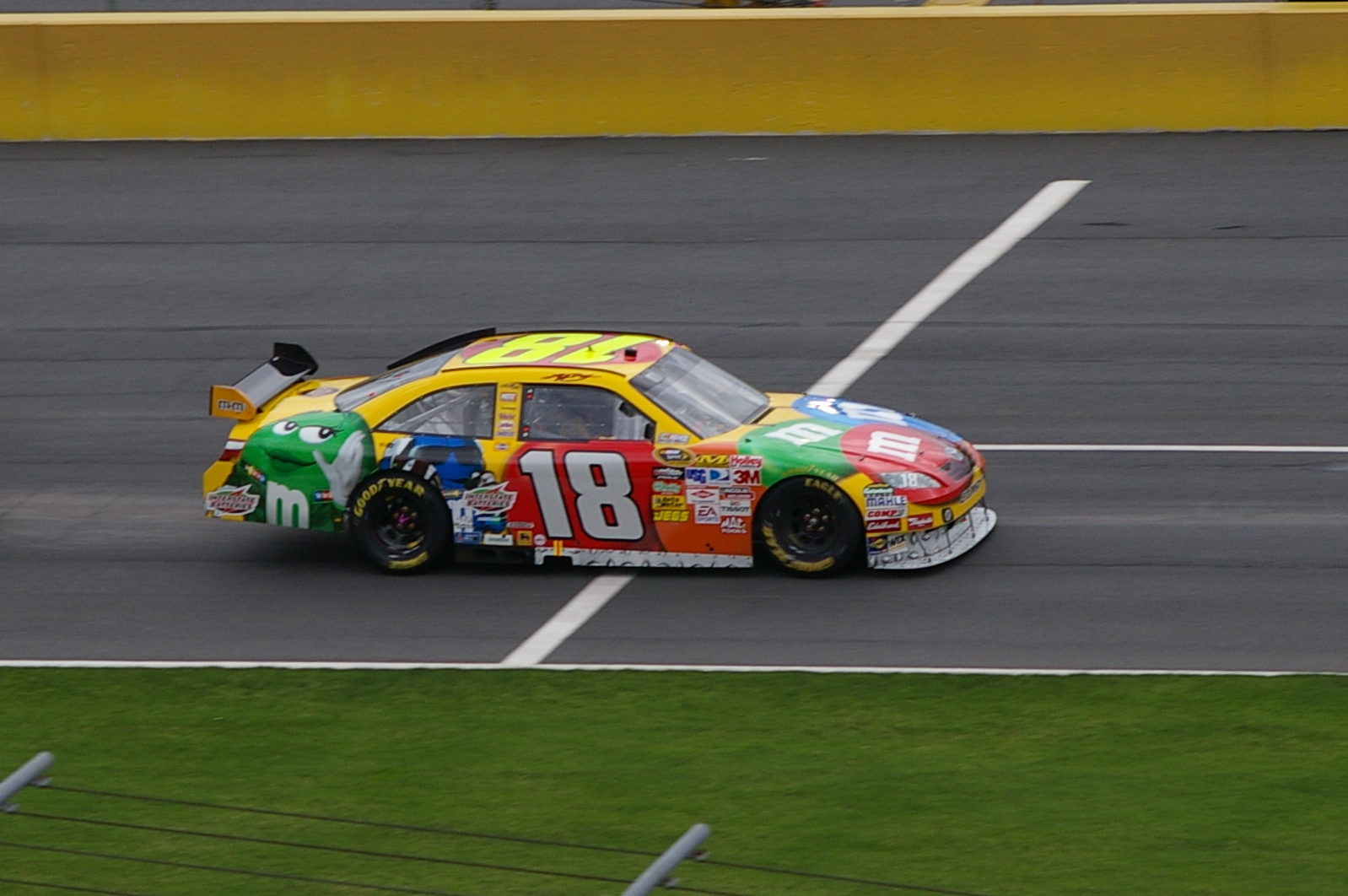
Pole position winner Kyle Busch in 2009

Three practice sessions were scheduled before the race, one before qualifying on Friday, June 4, 2010, and two on Saturday, June 5, 2010. In the first practice session the quickest five drivers were Jimmie Johnson, Juan Pablo Montoya, Denny Hamlin, Dale Earnhardt Jr., and A. J. Allmendinger. In the second practice, Jimmie Johnson was quickest, while Juan Pablo Montoya, Jeff Burton, Clint Bowyer, and Kyle Busch followed. During the final practice session, Jeff Burton was first fastest, Jimmie Johnson second, Denny Hamlin in third, fourth is Jamie McMurray, and Kevin Harvick fifth.

In qualifying, Kyle Busch won the pole position, while Clint Bowyer, Dale Earnhardt Jr., Kurt Busch, and Denny Hamlin completed the top-five positions. There were 45 entries for the race, but only 43 can race which meant that two drivers would not make the race; they were Terry Cook and Ted Musgrave.

=== Race summary ===
At 12:00 p.m. EDT, Turner Network Television started broadcasting with the "Countdown to Green". At the start of the race, weather was predicted to be mostly cloudy with scattered thunderstorms. At 12:55 p.m. EDT, pre-race ceremonies began with Mrs. Phil DeRea delivered the invocation, then Clarke Luis performed the national anthem. To start engines, WWE Champion John Cena and the Gillette ProGlide Believers all said the command, "Gentlemen, Start Your Engines!". While under the pace laps, inclement weather moved in the area to cause a two-hour rain delay. During the rain delay, NASCAR decided that there would be a competition caution on lap 15.

At 3:07 p.m. EDT, the green flag waved to start the race. On lap 5, Denny Hamlin passed Kyle Busch for the lead. Ten laps later, the competition caution came out, then most of the drivers came down to make their pit stops . On lap 18, Bobby Labonte stayed out to lead one lap, then he came down to pit. Kyle Busch, on lap 20, led to field on the restart. Kyle Busch led the race until Clint Bowyer passed him on lap 38. Nine laps later, green flag pit stops began. On lap 79, Clint Bowyer made a pit stop and gave the lead to Denny Hamlin, but two laps later, Bowyer regained the lead.

On lap 85, there were only twenty-two cars on the lead lap where Clint Bowyer had lapped twenty-one cars. Twelve laps later, the second caution came out because of debris in turn two. Afterwards, all the lead lap cars made pit stops, and Kyle Busch regained the lead. On lap 101 the restart started with Kevin Harvick, Kyle Busch, Denny Hamlin, Clint Bowyer, and Jimmie Johnson going four wide on the straightaway. Kevin Harvick then became the leader, but on lap 106, his car got loose and went toward the outside wall to give Denny Hamlin the lead. On lap 126, Denny Hamlin continued to lead with 75 lap to go. On lap 131, the second set of green flag pit stops began. One lap later, leader Denny Hamlin made a pit stops, but kept his position on the race track.

On lap 151, the teams were worried because they didn't have enough to make it to the checkered flag. Four laps later, the third caution came out because there was debris on the Long Pond straightaway. After all lead lap cars made pit stops, Denny Hamlin brought the field to the green flag, but on the same lap, the fourth caution came out because Casey Mears, and Elliott Sadler collided. One lap later, Kyle Busch became the leader. On lap 164, the green flag waved as Kyle Busch was the leader. One lap later, Denny Hamlin regained the lead. On lap 167, David Ragan collided with Jamie McMurray to make him collide with the wall which brought out the fifth caution. Most of the leaders made pit stops for fuel, but Kurt Busch stayed out to become the leader on the restart on lap 171.

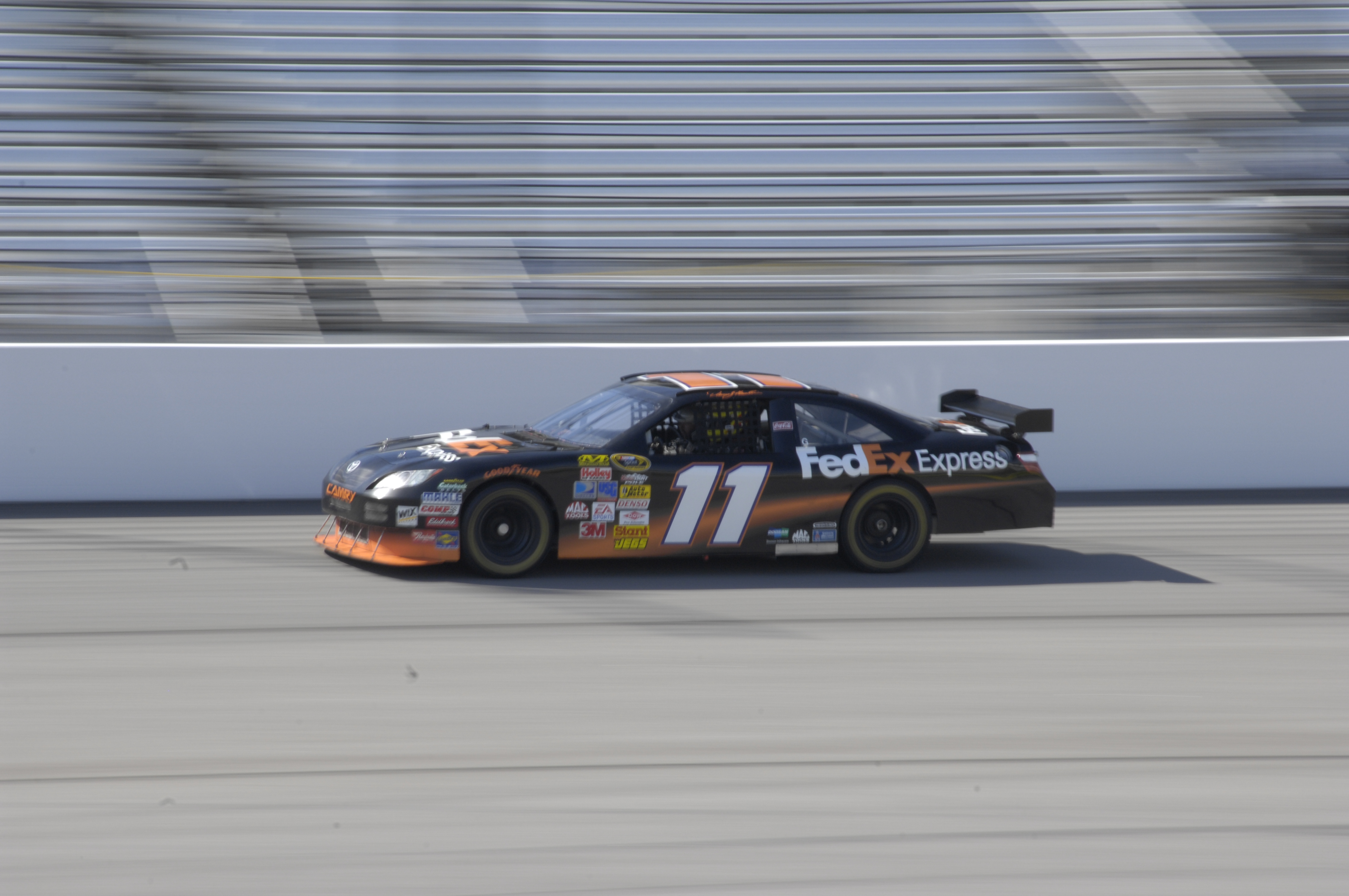
Race winner Denny Hamlin in 2010

One lap later, Sam Hornish Jr. passed Kurt Busch for the lead. On lap 175, the sixth caution came out because of debris in turn three. Some of the lead lap cars made pit stops, while the top-ten stayed out. Hornish, Jr, then, brought the field to the green flag on lap 179. Hornish continued to lead until Denny Hamlin passed him on lap 189. Ten laps later, the seventh caution came out because Kevin Harvick and Joey Logano collided. The caution caused a green-white-checkered finish; the restart was on lap 202. Then, one lap later, the white flag was given, but on the backstretch Kasey Kahne was blocked by A. J. Allmendinger, then went through the grass, went toward the outside wall, went airborne as Mark Martin and Greg Biffle collided into him, and went to rest in the middle of the straightaway. The wreck collected a total of 10 cars including Martin Truex Jr., Jeff Gordon, Ryan Newman, Elliott Sadler, Marcos Ambrose, David Ragan, and David Stremme. Then, Denny Hamlin took the checkered flag as he won his fourth race of the 2010 season. Following the race, an altercation ensued between Logano and Harvick's pit crew.

=== Penalties ===
At the time when the race was about to resume after the rain delay, Sprint Cup Series officials noticed that the rear tires of Travis Kvapil's Ford were nearly flat. They made a pit stop while the rest of the field were under the pace laps. After the race, their car went under inspection which showed that the car was using bleeder valves, which were installed on the valve stems to regulate tire pressure. The infraction has one of the severest penalties in NASCAR. The infraction cost the Front Row Motorsports #38 team 150 owner points (Doug Yates is listed as the owner of the #38), Kvapil 150 driver points, US$100,000, and the suspension of three crew members for twelve weeks. Front Row Motorsports appealed the decision, which knocked the team from 32nd to 36th, forcing the team to qualify on time. The penalties were upheld by NASCAR on June 22, 2010. In an unusual move, the penalty moved the #7 Robby Gordon Motorsports entry back into the Top 35, despite failing to qualify with Ted Musgrave (Robby himself was competing in a Trophy Truck race so Musgrave qualified the car for him). The penalty had a season-long effect on the #38 team, as they were never able to get back into the Top 35 and failed to qualify for three races.

== Results ==
Pos	Grid	Car	Driver	Team	Make
1	5	11	Denny Hamlin	Joe Gibbs Racing	Toyota
2	1	18	Kyle Busch	Joe Gibbs Racing	Toyota
3	6	14	Tony Stewart	Stewart–Haas Racing	Chevrolet
4	22	29	Kevin Harvick	Richard Childress Racing	Chevrolet
5	25	48	Jimmie Johnson	Hendrick Motorsports	Chevrolet
6	4	2	Kurt Busch	Penske Racing	Dodge
7	13	31	Jeff Burton	Richard Childress Racing	Chevrolet
8	7	42	Juan Pablo Montoya	Earnhardt Ganassi Racing	Chevrolet
9	2	33	Clint Bowyer	Richard Childress Racing	Chevrolet
10	17	43	A. J. Allmendinger	Richard Petty Motorsports	Ford
11	19	77	Sam Hornish Jr.	Penske Racing	Dodge
12	26	99	Carl Edwards	Roush Fenway Racing	Ford
13	12	20	Joey Logano	Joe Gibbs Racing	Toyota
14	9	39	Ryan Newman	Stewart–Haas Racing	Chevrolet
15	29	00	David Reutimann	Michael Waltrip Racing	Toyota
16	33	98	Paul Menard	Richard Petty Motorsports	Ford
17	15	17	Matt Kenseth	Roush Fenway Racing	Ford
18	24	78	Regan Smith	Furniture Row Racing	Chevrolet
19	3	88	Dale Earnhardt Jr.	Hendrick Motorsports	Chevrolet
20	31	82	Scott Speed	Team Red Bull	Toyota
21	11	12	Brad Keselowski	Penske Racing	Dodge
22	38	38	Travis Kvapil	Front Row Motorsports	Ford
23	23	83	Casey Mears	Team Red Bull	Toyota
24	43	26	David Stremme	Latitude 43 Motorsports	Ford
25	27	56	Martin Truex Jr.	Michael Waltrip Racing	Toyota
26	35	6	David Ragan	Roush Fenway Racing	Ford
27	8	9	Kasey Kahne	Richard Petty Motorsports	Ford
28	28	16	Greg Biffle	Roush Fenway Racing	Ford
29	14	5	Mark Martin	Hendrick Motorsports	Chevrolet
30	16	47	Marcos Ambrose	JTG Daugherty Racing	Toyota
31	21	19	Elliott Sadler	Richard Petty Motorsports	Ford
32	10	24	Jeff Gordon	Hendrick Motorsports	Chevrolet
33	37	37	David Gilliland	Front Row Motorsports	Ford
34	20	13	Max Papis	Germain Racing	Toyota
35	42	34	Kevin Conway	Front Row Mototsports	Ford
36	18	1	Jamie McMurray	Earnhardt Ganassi Racing	Chevrolet
37	36	46	J. J. Yeley	Whitney Motorsports	Dodge
38	41	71	Bobby Labonte	TRG Motorsports	Chevrolet
39	32	55	Michael McDowell	Prism Motorsports	Toyota
40	34	66	Dave Blaney	Prism Motorsports	Toyota
41	40	36	Geoffrey Bodine	Tommy Baldwin Racing	Chevrolet
42	39	64	Chad McCumbee	Gunselman Motorsports	Toyota
43	30	87	Joe Nemechek	NEMCO Motorsports	Toyota

Previous race: 2010 Coca-Cola 600	Sprint Cup Series; 2010 season	Next race: 2010 Heluva Good! Sour Cream Dips 400
