= ExtenZe =

Brand of male enhancement pills

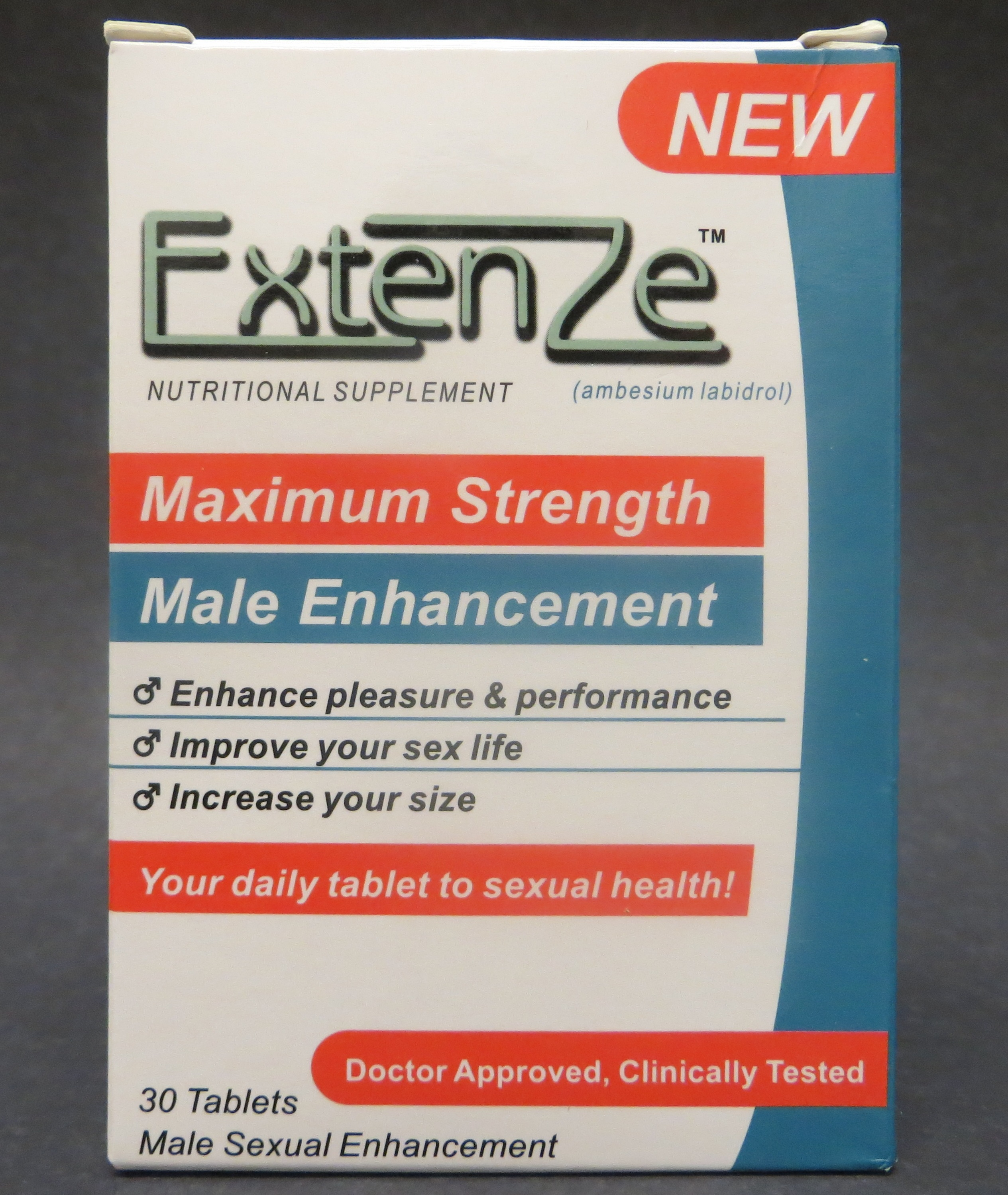
ExtenZe packaging

ExtenZe is an herbal nutritional supplement claiming to promote "natural male enhancement", a euphemism for penis enlargement. ExtenZe paid $6 million to settle a class-action false advertising lawsuit in 2010.

Websites selling the product make several more detailed claims, including acquiring a "larger penis". Their enlarging effects are described as "temporary" while under the use of ExtenZe. Early infomercials featured a studio audience and porn star Ron Jeremy. Former Dallas Cowboys and Miami Hurricanes head coach Jimmy Johnson has also appeared in an ExtenZe commercial. ExtenZe makes pills and 2-ounce shots that are sold in over 75,000 retail stores.

The product is manufactured by BIOTAB Nutraceuticals, Inc., and marketed by Maximizer Health Products.

== False advertising and side effects ==
In 2006, ExtenZe agreed to pay the Orange County, California, district attorney's office $300,000 in civil penalties for unfair business practices and false advertising. Susan Kang Schroeder of the DA's office said the company could not back up its claim that the pills caused users' penises to grow by 27%. After several customers in Laguna Beach, California complained to the Better Business Bureau that ExtenZe was making them sick, the district attorney investigated.

ExtenZe maker, Biotab Nutraceuticals, Inc., settled a class action false advertising lawsuit in 2010 for $6 million. The plaintiffs claimed that ExtenZe made deceptive marketing claims about the product enlarging a man’s penis despite lacking credible scientific evidence to support these claims.

ExtenZe's side effects are possibly associated with yohimbe extract. Potential side effects include increased body temperature, increased blood pressure, sweating, increased heart rate, nausea, and upset stomach. Other side effects can include aggression, pounding heart, restlessness, fever, feeling like fainting, hallucinations, muscle twitches or spasms, abnormal behavior, severe headache, bruising easily, shortness of breath, blurred vision, seizures, ringing in the ears, chest pain, confusion, loss of appetite, weight loss, vomiting, insomnia, mild skin rash, nervousness, cold feeling in the feet or hands, tingling or numbness in the feet or hands and difficulty when sleeping.

In 2018, ExtenZe came under scrutiny of the FDA as a certain production lot of ExtenZe and ExtenZe Plus was found to contain sildenafil, which is the active ingredient in Viagra.

== Sports ==
=== Doping ===
ExtenZe contains dehydroepiandrosterone (DHEA), which is considered a performance-enhancing drug and is banned by the Olympics and the World Anti-Doping Agency, and in the United States by the National Collegiate Athletic Association, the National Football League, and the National Basketball Association. In 2010, 400-meter Olympic gold medalist LaShawn Merritt was banned from competition for taking ExtenZe. Merritt apologized, saying that he did not realize that the formulation contained DHEA. Merritt provisionally accepted a two-year ban from competition, although he announced plans to appeal. Sports authorities, however, were not sympathetic:

"Any professional athlete in this sport knows that they are solely responsible for anything that goes into their bodies. For Mr. Merritt to claim inadvertent use of a banned substance due to the ingestion of over-the-counter supplements brings shame to himself and his teammates. Thanks to his selfish actions, he has done damage to our efforts to fight the plague of performance-enhancing drugs in our sport," USA Track and Field CEO Doug Logan said in a press release.

Late in 2011, however, his ban ended and he was cleared to compete in the 2012 Olympics.

=== Sponsorship ===
ExtenZe sponsored 2010 NASCAR Rookie of the Year Kevin Conway in both NASCAR Cup Series and NASCAR Nationwide Series from 2009 to 2011. ExtenZe faced legal actions by both of Conway's Cup Series teams in 2010, Front Row Motorsports and Robby Gordon Motorsports, after ExtenZe allegedly paid neither team's sponsorship money. Conway and ExtenZe would join NEMCO Motorsports in 2011. The deal, however, was very limited and unlike Front Row and Robby Gordon, NEMCO was not financially compromised.

== Ingredients ==
It has been reported that the product website lists DHEA as an ingredient.

The following ingredients comprise ExtenZe, as reported on the images of labels on vendor websites:

- Folate (folic acid)
- Zinc (as oxide)
- Micronized DHEA (dehydroepiandrosterone)
- Pregnanolone (3β-hydroxypregn-5-en-20-one)
- Black pepper (seed)
- Piper longum (seed)
- Ginger (root)
- Yohimbe extract (bark)
- Tribulus terrestris extract (aerial part and fruit)
- Korean ginseng extract (root)
- Cnidium monnieri (seed)
- Eleutherococcus extract (root) standardized to .8% eleutherosides
- Xanthroparmelia scarbosa (aerial part)
- γ-Aminobutyric acid (GABA)
- Velvet deer antler
- Horny goat weed (leaf)
- Damiana (leaf)
- Muira puama extract (stem)
- Pumpkin (seed)
- Stinging nettle (root)
- Astragalus (root)
- Licorice extract (root)
- L-arginine hydrochloride
- Ho Shou Wu extract (root)
- Boron (as chelate)
- Other ingredients include dicalcium phosphate, microcrystalline cellulose, croscarmellose sodium, stearic acid, film coating (dextrin), titanium dioxide, hydroxypropylmethyl cellulose, brilliant blue FCF, aluminum lake, Macrogol/PEG 8000, dextrose monohydrate, lecithin, maltodextrin, Macrogol/PEG 400, magnesium stearate, and silica.

Although the company claims that the product is completely natural, FDA testing confirmed that at least two of ExtenZe's variants, including ExtenZe Plus, contain traces of sildenafil, a prescription medicine used to treat erectile dysfunction.

== See also ==
- Erectile dysfunction
- Enzyte
- Penis enlargement
