= 2010 Price Chopper 400 =

2010 Price Chopper 400 presented by Kraft Foods
Race details
- Race 29 of 36 in the 2010 NASCAR Sprint Cup Series
- The 2010 Price Chopper 400 program cover.
- Date: October 3, 2010
- Location: Kansas Speedway, Kansas City, Kansas, US
- Course: Permanent racing facility
- Course length: 1.5 miles (2.414 km)
- Distance: 267 laps, 400.5 mi (644.542 km)
- Weather: Sunny with a high of 60; wind out of the east at 8 mph
- Average speed: 138.077 miles per hour (222.213 km/h)

Pole position
Driver	Kasey Kahne	Richard Petty Motorsports
- Time: 30.920

Most laps led
Driver	Tony Stewart	Stewart Haas Racing
- Laps: 76

Winner
No. 16	Greg Biffle	Roush Fenway Racing

Television in the United States
- Network: ESPN
- Announcers: Marty Reid, Dale Jarrett and Andy Petree

The 2010 Price Chopper 400 was a NASCAR Sprint Cup Series race that was held on October 3, 2010, at Kansas Speedway in Kansas City, Kansas, United States. The 300-lap race was the twenty-ninth in the 2010 NASCAR Sprint Cup Series. The race was also the third event in the ten-round Chase for the Sprint Cup competition, which would conclude the 2010 season. Greg Biffle, of the Roush Fenway Racing team, won the race, with Jimmie Johnson finishing second and Kevin Harvick third.

Pole position driver Kasey Kahne maintained his lead on the first lap to begin the race, as Jeff Gordon, who started in the third position on the grid, remained behind him. Twenty-three laps later Jeff Gordon became the leader of the race. After the final pit stops, Paul Menard became the leader of the race, but with less than fifty laps remaining, Biffle passed him. He maintained the first position to lead a total of sixty laps, and to win his second race of the season.

There were five cautions and twenty lead changes among twelve different drivers throughout the course of the race. It was Greg Biffle's second win in the 2010 season, and the sixteenth of his career. The result moved Biffle up to eighth in the Drivers' Championship, eighty-five points behind Jimmie Johnson and sixteen ahead of Jeff Burton. Chevrolet maintained its lead in the Manufacturers' Championship, thirty-seven ahead of Toyota and seventy-seven ahead of Ford, with seven races remaining in the season. A total of 100,000 people attended the race, while 5.25 million watched it on television.

== Report ==
=== Background ===
Kansas Speedway is one of ten intermediate to hold NASCAR races. The standard track at Kansas Speedway is a four-turn D-shaped oval track that is 1.5 miles (2.4 km) long. The track's turns are banked at fifteen degrees, while the front stretch, the location of the finish line, is 10.4 degrees. The back stretch, opposite of the front, is at only five degrees. The racetrack has seats for 82,000 spectators.

Before the race, Denny Hamlin led the Drivers' Championship with 5,368 points, and Jimmie Johnson stood in second with 5,333. Kyle Busch was third in the Drivers' Championship with 5,323 points, fourteen ahead of Kurt Busch and twenty ahead of Kevin Harvick in fourth and fifth. Carl Edwards with 5,295 was seven ahead of Jeff Burton, as Jeff Gordon with 5,285 points, was fifty-seven ahead of Greg Biffle, and seventy-nine in front of Tony Stewart. Matt Kenseth and Clint Bowyer was eleventh and twelfth with 5,203 and 5,130 points. In the Manufacturers' Championship, Chevrolet was leading with 206 points, thirty-five ahead of Toyota. Ford, with 126 points, was thirteen points ahead of Dodge in the battle for third. Tony Stewart was the race's defending champion.

=== Practice and qualifying ===
Three practice sessions were held before the Sunday race, one on Friday, and two on Saturday. The first session lasted 90 minutes, the second session lasted 45 minutes, and the final session lasted 60 minutes. During the first practice session, Juan Pablo Montoya, for the Earnhardt Ganassi Racing team, was quickest ahead of Ryan Newman in second and Jimmie Johnson in the third position. Paul Menard was scored fourth, and Jamie McMurray managed fifth. Carl Edwards, Clint Bowyer, Joey Logano, Denny Hamlin, and David Reutimann rounded out the top ten quickest drivers in the session.

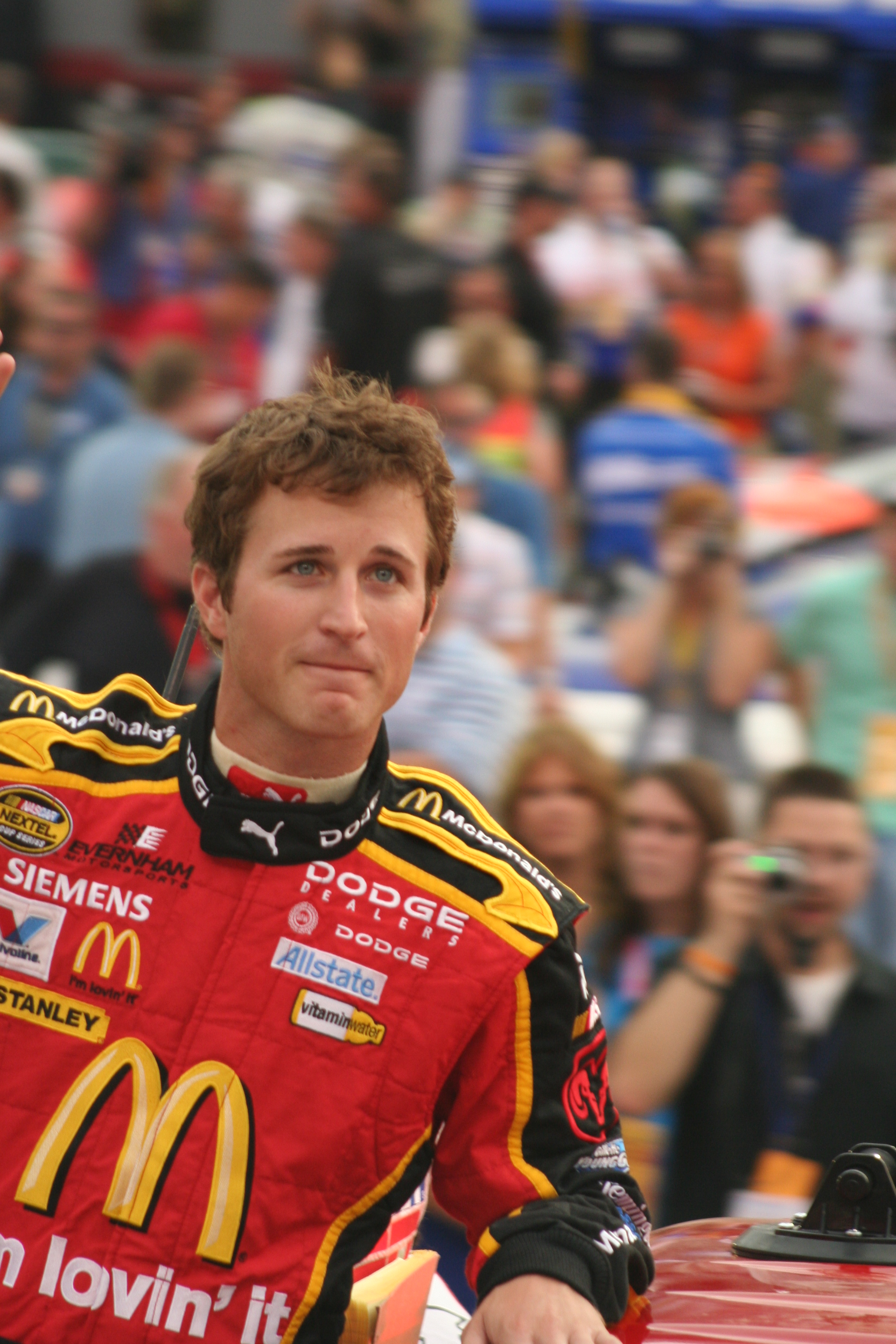
Kasey Kahne won the pole position, after having the fastest time of 30.920 seconds.

During qualifying, forty-six cars were entered, but only forty-three were able because of NASCAR's qualifying procedure. Kasey Kahne clinched his eighteenth pole position in the Sprint Cup Series, with a time of 30.920. He was joined on the front row of the grid by Menard. Jeff Gordon qualified third, Joey Logano took fourth, and Greg Biffle started fifth. Kevin Harvick, one of the drivers in the Chase for the Sprint Cup, qualified twenty-fourth, while Carl Edwards was scored thirty-first. The three drivers that failed to qualify for the race were Jason Leffler, Mike Bliss, and Joe Nemechek. Once qualifying concluded, Kahne stated, "Coming to the green I felt great. I got through one and two really good and just got a little bit free into three so I missed the entrance a touch and then was able to gather it back and get rolling. I gave up a little bit of time there." He also added, "I noticed Paul Menard gained a lot right there in three going out late. He actually came really close to clipping us off. It was good. I’m glad we got the pole for Budweiser and Ford. It’ll be exciting, a couple of RPM guys on the front row on Sunday. That’s pretty exciting for the whole company. They did a real nice job."

On the next morning, Kurt Busch was quickest in the second practice session, ahead of Gordon and Matt Kenseth in second and third. Reutimann was fourth quickest, and Greg Biffle took fifth. Johnson, Dale Earnhardt Jr., Kahne, David Ragan, and Edwards followed in the top-ten. Other drivers in the chase, such as Kyle Busch, was twenty-first, and Kevin Harvick, who was twenty-second. Also in the second practice session, Biffle, who was scored fifth, spun sideways coming to the finish line, but received minor damage. During the third, and final practice session, Mark Martin, with a fastest time of 31.574, was quickest. Jimmie Johnson and Greg Biffle followed in second and third with times of 31.596 and 31.609 seconds. Logano managed to be fourth fastest, ahead of Jeff Gordon and Paul Menard. Edwards was scored seventh, McMurray took eighth, Bowyer was ninth, and Ragan took tenth. In this practice, both Martin and Johnson spun sideways at different times. Neither, Martin or Johnson sustained major damages to their race cars during the accidents.

=== Race ===
The race, the twenty-ninth out of a total of thirty-six in the season, began at 1:00 p.m. EDT and was televised live in the United States on ESPN. Prior to the race, weather conditions were sunny with the air temperature around 60 °F (16 °C). Steve Schulze, pastor of Parsons Foursquare Church, began pre-race ceremonies, by giving the invocation. Next, Betti O., an Army veteran from Manhattan, Kansas, performed the national anthem, and Kelli Fuller, a Price Chopper contest winner, gave the command for drivers to start their engines. On the pace laps, three drivers had to move the rear of the grid; they were Mark Martin, Marcos Ambrose, both because of an engine change, and Casey Mears because of a transmission change.

Kasey Kahne retained his pole position lead into the first corner, followed by Paul Menard in the second position. On the same lap, Jeff Gordon passed Menard to claim second. Greg Biffle, who had started fifth, fell three position to eighth by lap two. Afterward, Biffle had fallen to ninth, and he started complaining about his car handling. By the ninth lap, Kahne had a 1.2 second lead over Gordon. Menard challenged Gordon for the second position on lap twelve. Matt Kenseth passed Joey Logano for fifth, while Biffle moved three positions to sixth. Kahne's lead grew more by lap 17, but less than two laps later, Gordon began to catch him. On lap 24, Kevin Conway was put a lap behind, after being passed by Kahne. Four laps later, Gordon became the new leader, after Kahne led twenty-seven laps.

On lap 29, Gordon was the leader, ahead of Kahne in second, Ryan Newman in third, Matt Kenseth was fourth, and Biffle in fifth. During the laps, 30 through 34, several drivers were put a lap down, which included, Tony Raines, Bobby Labonte, and Travis Kvapil. Afterward, Landon Cassill drove his car to the garage, as Gordon passed J. J. Yeley to put him a lap behind. had a lead of 3.4 secs when a caution was shown because Juan Pablo Montoya collided into the SAFER barrier. The drivers on the same lap as the leader made a pit stop during the caution, but Michael McDowell stayed on the race track to lead one lap before giving the lead back to Jeff Gordon.

On lap 49, Kurt Busch passed Kahne for the third position. Three laps later, the second caution was given because Kyle Busch crashed into David Reutimann, causing him to spin into the SAFER barrier. Most drivers stayed on the race track, but some exceptions were Jamie McMurray, Jimmie Johnson, and Clint Bowyer. One lap after the restart, Kenseth became the leader, after passing Gordon. After the collision, Reutimann was several laps behind the leader. After restarting second, Newman had fallen to sixth, while Tony Stewart moved into third. Seven laps later, Stewart claimed second from Gordon. Gordon was passed by Biffle on lap 72, as Stewart was catching Kenseth. Newman fell to eighth on lap 77, after Kyle Busch and Kevin Harvick passed him.

Two laps later, Harvick claimed the sixth position from Kyle Busch. Afterwards, Stewart became the leader, passing Kenseth on lap 81. By lap 86, Stewart had a 1.4 second lead over Kenseth. Less than five laps later, Biffle passed Kenseth for the second position. On lap 93, green flag pit stops began. Stewart, followed by Biffle came to pit road, giving the lead back to Matt Kenseth two laps later. When Kenseth made his pit stop, he gave the lead to Jeff Gordon. Allmendinger became the leader, after Gordon, Jeff Burton, Johnson, Mark Martin, and Kurt Busch made pit stops. Once most of the drivers completed their pit stops, Patrick Carpentier was the leader. On lap 99, Sam Hornish Jr. drove to the garage because of drive shaft problems. Four laps later, Travis Kvapil, who was running third, made his pit stop. Kvapil was followed by the second running car, David Gilliland. On lap 108, Carpentier drove to pit road for his pit stop, giving the lead to Stewart.

Five laps later, Johnson passed Kahne for the twelfth position. By the 123rd lap, Stewart had a 2.2 second lead over Biffle. Brad Keselowski and Elliott Sadler became a lap behind the leader, after Stewart passed them on lap 135. Nine laps later, green flag pit stops began. Afterward, Stewart gave the lead to Harvick, when he made a pit stop. Once Harvick came to pit road, Burton became the leader. On lap 149, Stewart reclaimed the lead. Three laps later, Reutimann collided with Kyle Busch, prompting the third caution on the race to be given. Most drivers made pit stops during the caution, but Harvick was an exception. Harvick led on the restart, as Stewart moved into second. On lap 163, Biffle passed Mark Martin for fourth, as Newman fell to sixth.

One lap later, Kahne collided into the SAFER barrier to cause the fourth caution. Most drivers after the ninth position made pit stops during the caution. Harvick led during the restart, but Stewart managed to pass Harvick to lead the next lap. Afterward, Harivck fell to third, as Biffle passed him. On lap 175, Burton moved to fifth, while Stewart had a 1.2 second lead over second. Then on lap 186, the fifth caution was given because Conway's engine failed. On the restart, McMurray was the leader, but he fell to second one lap later, after Menard passed him. On lap 202, Harvick passed McMurray for the fifth position. Five laps later, Biffle passed Menard to become the leader.

Afterward, Johnson moved to seventh, after passing Newman and McMurray. Gordon passed McMurray three laps later. By lap 220, Biffle had a 2.1 second lead over Menard, as Harvick passed Edwards for fourth. With 39 laps remaining, Biffle expanded his lead to 3.2 seconds. Four laps later, Johnson moved to sixth, after passing Edwards. On lap 135, the final green flag pit stops began. Once they began, Edwards became the leader, but one lap later, Biffle reclaimed the lead. After the pit stops concluded, Biffle was first, ahead of Stewart, Kenseth, Johnson, and Harvick in the top-five positions. By lap 244, Biffle had a 5.1 second lead over Stewart. One lap later, Johnson passed Kenseth for the third position. With less than ten laps remaining Stewart fell to fourth, after Johnson and Harvick passed him. Greg Biffle maintained the lead to win his second race of the 2010 season. Jimmie Johnson finished second, ahead of Harvick in third and Stewart in fourth. Gordon clinched the fifth position, after starting third.

=== Post-race ===
"It was a great day for us. The car ran flawless. [Crew chief Greg] Erwin just made great calls in the pits, and the car just kept getting better and better and better. I was too loose for about the first three-quarters of the race. I didn't want to adjust on it, because I was running in the top three, but they tightened it up, and off it went, man. All it needed was a little bit of wedge in it to take off."

— Greg Biffle, speaking after the race.

Greg Biffle appeared in victory lane after his victory lap to start celebrating his second win of the season, in front of a crowd of 100,000 people. Afterward, he said, "We were kind of down in the dumps about Dover, one of our best race tracks, and we got trapped [when forced to pit off-sequence] – we had a top-10 car there. But we can't go back and do it over again. We'll keep doing the best we can. Everybody asks if we're out of it, and I said, 'We're going to do the best we can. If we win 'em all, we win 'em all."

"We had to change a lot of the race car around to get it right for today. It leads to a sleepless night and a frustrating morning, having anxious moments before the race, said second place finisher, Jimmie Johnson. Then, Denny Hamlin, who finished twelfth, stated, "It's not the kind of run we wanted, but we're not out of this by any means. The good part is we didn't panic."

Following the race, Johnson became the Drivers' Championship point standings leader with 5,503. Hamlin stood in second, eight points behind Johnson, and twenty-two ahead of Kevin Harvick. Carl Edwards, after finishing sixth in the race, remained in the fourth position with 5,450 points. Jeff Gordon was fifth, as Kurt Busch, Kyle Busch, Biffle, Jeff Burton, and Tony Stewart followed in the top-ten positions. The final two positions available in the Chase for the Sprint Cup was occupied with Matt Kenseth in eleventh and Clint Bowyer in twelfth. In the Manufacturers' Championship, Chevrolet maintained their lead with 212 points. Toyota remained second with 175 points. Ford followed with 135 points, nineteen points ahead of Dodge in fourth. 5.25 million people watched the race on television. The race took two hours, fifty-four minutes and two seconds to complete, and the margin of victory was 7.638 seconds.

== Results ==
=== Qualifying ===
Grid	No	Driver	Team	Manufacturer	Time	Speed
1	9	Kasey Kahne	Richard Petty Motorsports	Ford	30.920	174.644
2	98	Paul Menard	Richard Petty Motorsports	Ford	30.951	174.469
3	24	Jeff Gordon	Hendrick Motorsports	Chevrolet	30.958	174.430
4	20	Joey Logano	Joe Gibbs Racing	Toyota	30.979	174.312
5	16	Greg Biffle	Roush Fenway Racing	Ford	30.989	174.255
6	39	Ryan Newman	Stewart Haas Racing	Chevrolet	31.008	174.149
7	42	Juan Pablo Montoya	Earnhardt Ganassi Racing	Chevrolet	31.043	173.952
8	17	Matt Kenseth	Roush Fenway Racing	Ford	31.052	173.902
9	2	Kurt Busch	Penske Racing	Dodge	31.057	173.874
10	6	David Ragan	Roush Fenway Racing	Ford	31.076	173.768
11	21	Bill Elliott	Wood Brothers Racing	Ford	31.079	173.751
12	11	Denny Hamlin	Joe Gibbs Racing	Toyota	31.088	173.701
13	78	Regan Smith	Furniture Row Racing	Chevrolet	31.102	173.622
14	14	Tony Stewart	Stewart Haas Racing	Chevrolet	31.139	173.416
15	19	Elliott Sadler	Richard Petty Motorsports	Ford	31.146	173.377
16	00	David Reutimann	Michael Waltrip Racing	Toyota	31.151	173.349
17	09	Bobby Labonte	Phoenix Racing	Chevrolet	31.156	173.321
18	77	Sam Hornish Jr.	Penske Racing	Dodge	31.173	173.227
19	18	Kyle Busch	Joe Gibbs Racing	Toyota	31.182	173.177
20	88	Dale Earnhardt Jr.	Hendrick Motorsports	Chevrolet	31.200	173.077
21	48	Jimmie Johnson	Hendrick Motorsports	Chevrolet	31.207	173.038
22	1	Jamie McMurray	Earnhardt Ganassi Racing	Chevrolet	31.208	173.033
23	31	Jeff Burton	Richard Childress Racing	Chevrolet	31.210	173.021
24	29	Kevin Harvick	Richard Childress Racing	Chevrolet	31.221	172.960
25	56	Martin Truex Jr.	Michael Waltrip Racing	Toyota	31.226	172.933
26	12	Brad Keselowski	Penske Racing	Dodge	31.235	172.883
27	33	Clint Bowyer	Richard Childress Racing	Chevrolet	31.252	172.789
28	5	Mark Martin	Hendrick Motorsports	Chevrolet	31.267	172.706
29	46	Michael McDowell	Whitney Motorsports	Chevrolet	31.284	172.612
30	43	A. J. Allmendinger	Richard Petty Motorsports	Ford	31.294	172.557
31	99	Carl Edwards	Roush Fenway Racing	Ford	31.299	172.529
32	47	Marcos Ambrose	JTG Daugherty Racing	Toyota	31.321	172.408
33	82	Scott Speed	Red Bull Racing Team	Toyota	31.387	172.046
34	83	Reed Sorenson	Red Bull Racing Team	Toyota	31.391	172.024
35	64	Landon Cassill	Gunselman Motorsports	Toyota	31.398	171.986
36	26	Patrick Carpentier	Latitude 43 Motorsports	Ford	31.444	171.734
37	13	Casey Mears	Germain Racing	Toyota	31.446	171.723
38	37	David Gilliland	Front Row Motorsports	Ford	31.485	171.510
39	36	J. J. Yeley	Tommy Baldwin Racing	Chevrolet	31.506	171.396
40	34	Travis Kvapil	Front Row Motorsports	Ford	31.631	170.719
41	7	Kevin Conway	Robby Gordon Motorsports	Toyota	31.707	170.309
42	71	Tony Raines	TRG Motorsports	Chevrolet	31.870	169.438
43	38	Dave Blaney	Front Row Motorsports	Ford	31.530	171.266
Failed to qualify
	87	Joe Nemechek	NEMCO Motorsports	Toyota	31.532	171.255
	55	Mike Bliss	Prism Motorsports	Toyota	31.661	170.557
	66	Jason Leffler	Prism Motorsports	Toyota	31.865	169.465

=== Race results ===
Pos	Grid	Car	Driver	Team	Manufacturer	Laps	Points
1	5	16	Greg Biffle	Roush Fenway Racing	Ford	267	190^{1}
2	21	48	Jimmie Johnson	Hendrick Motorsports	Chevrolet	267	170
3	24	29	Kevin Harvick	Richard Childress Racing	Chevrolet	267	170^{1}
4	14	14	Tony Stewart	Stewart Haas Racing	Chevrolet	267	170^{2}
5	3	24	Jeff Gordon	Hendrick Motorsports	Chevrolet	267	160^{1}
6	31	99	Carl Edwards	Roush Fenway Racing	Ford	267	155^{1}
7	8	17	Matt Kenseth	Roush Fenway Racing	Ford	267	151^{1}
8	2	98	Paul Menard	Richard Petty Motorsports	Ford	267	147^{1}
9	6	39	Ryan Newman	Stewart Haas Racing	Chevrolet	267	138
10	30	43	A. J. Allmendinger	Richard Petty Motorsports	Ford	267	134
11	22	1	Jamie McMurray	Earnhardt Ganassi Racing	Chevrolet	267	135^{1}
12	12	11	Denny Hamlin	Joe Gibbs Racing	Toyota	267	127
13	9	2	Kurt Busch	Penske Racing	Dodge	267	124
14	28	5	Mark Martin	Hendrick Motorsports	Chevrolet	267	121
15	27	33	Clint Bowyer	Richard Childress Racing	Chevrolet	267	118
16	10	6	David Ragan	Roush Fenway Racing	Ford	267	115
17	4	20	Joey Logano	Joe Gibbs Racing	Toyota	267	112
18	23	31	Jeff Burton	Richard Childress Racing	Chevrolet	267	114^{1}
19	33	82	Scott Speed	Red Bull Racing Team	Toyota	267	106
20	25	56	Martin Truex Jr.	Michael Waltrip Racing	Toyota	267	103
21	19	18	Kyle Busch	Joe Gibbs Racing	Toyota	266	100
22	20	88	Dale Earnhardt Jr.	Hendrick Motorsports	Chevrolet	266	97
23	26	12	Brad Keselowski	Penske Racing	Dodge	266	94
24	37	13	Casey Mears	Germain Racing	Toyota	266	91
25	11	21	Bill Elliott	Wood Brothers Racing	Ford	266	88
26	13	78	Regan Smith	Furniture Row Racing	Chevrolet	266	85
27	36	26	Patrick Carpentier	Latitude 43 Motorsports	Ford	266	87^{1}
28	15	19	Elliott Sadler	Richard Petty Motorsports	Ford	266	79
29	7	42	Juan Pablo Montoya	Earnhardt Ganassi Racing	Chevrolet	266	76
30	34	83	Reed Sorenson	Red Bull Racing Team	Toyota	265	73
31	43	38	Dave Blaney	Front Row Motorsports	Ford	261	70
32	38	37	David Gilliland	Front Row Motorsports	Ford	261	67
33	40	34	Travis Kvapil	Front Row Motorsports	Ford	261	64
34	32	47	Marcos Ambrose	JTG Daugherty Racing	Toyota	257	61
35	16	00	David Reutimann	Michael Waltrip Racing	Toyota	256	58
36	18	77	Sam Hornish Jr.	Penske Racing	Dodge	245	55
37	1	9	Kasey Kahne	Richard Petty Motorsports	Ford	218	57^{1}
38	41	7	Kevin Conway	Robby Gordon Motorsports	Toyota	180	49
39	42	71	Tony Raines	TRG Motorsports	Chevrolet	87	46
40	29	46	Michael McDowell	Whitney Motorsports	Chevrolet	60	48
41	17	09	Bobby Labonte	Phoenix Racing	Chevrolet	58	40
42	39	36	J. J. Yeley	Tommy Baldwin Racing	Chevrolet	49	37
43	35	64	Landon Cassill	Gunselman Motorsports	Toyota	33	34
^{1} Includes five bonus points for leading a lap
^{2} Includes ten bonus points for leading the most laps

== Standings after the race ==
Drivers' Championship standings

Pos	Driver	Points
1	Jimmie Johnson	5,503
2	Denny Hamlin	5,495
3	Kevin Harvick	5,473
4	Carl Edwards	5,450
5	Jeff Gordon	5,445
6	Kurt Busch	5,433
7	Kyle Busch	5,423
8	Greg Biffle	5,418
9	Jeff Burton	5,402
10	Tony Stewart	5,376
11	Matt Kenseth	5,354
12	Clint Bowyer	5,251

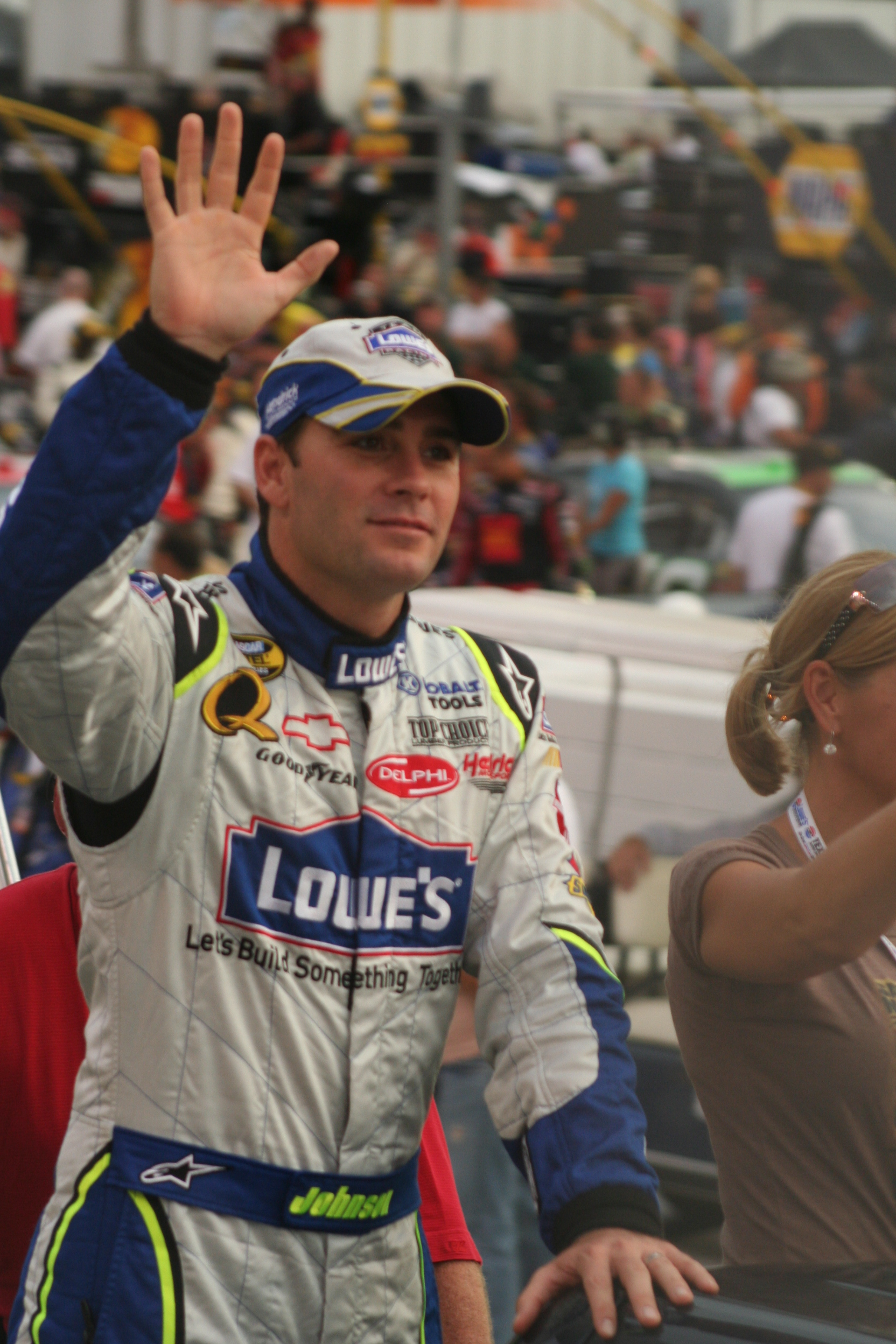
Jimmie Johnson became the points leader, after finishing second in the race.

Manufacturers' Championship standings

Pos	Manufacturer	Points
1	Chevrolet	212
2	Toyota	175
3	Ford	135
4	Dodge	116

- Note: Only the top twelve positions are included for the driver standings. These drivers qualified for the Chase for the Sprint Cup.

Previous race: 2010 AAA 400	Sprint Cup Series; 2010 season	Next race: 2010 Pepsi Max 400
