= Motor Racing Outreach =

Christian motorsport organization

Motor Racing Outreach (MRO) is a non-denominational Christian Protestant organization that serves the NASCAR Cup Series, NASCAR Xfinity Series, and various other levels and forms of motorsports across the United States.

== History ==
Motor Racing Outreach is a non-profit organization founded in 1988 to serve the Cup Series community. It was founded by Max Helton in response to a need presented by three drivers within the series who were unable to attend regular church services due to the demands of their schedule.
