= Robert Richardson Jr. (racing driver) =

American racing driver (born 1982)

- Born: April 4, 1982 (age 44); McKinney, Texas, U.S.
- Achievements: 2011 Lone Star Legends Champion

NASCAR Cup Series career
- 9 races run over 5 years
- 2016 position: 51st
- Best finish: 51st (2016)
- First race: 2009 AMP Energy 500 (Talladega)
- Last race: 2016 Daytona 500 (Daytona)
Wins	Top tens	Poles
0	0	0

NASCAR O'Reilly Auto Parts Series career
- 129 races run over 8 years
- 2014 position: 42nd
- Best finish: 24th (2011)
- First race: 2007 Orbitz 300 (Daytona)
- Last race: 2014 O'Reilly Auto Parts Challenge (Texas)
Wins	Top tens	Poles
0	1	0

NASCAR FedEx Freight Truck Series career
- 24 races run over 3 years
- Best finish: 30th (2006)
- First race: 2005 Las Vegas 350 (Las Vegas)
- Last race: 2009 Mountain Dew 250 (Talladega)
Wins	Top tens	Poles
0	0	0
- Statistics up to date as of February 21, 2016.

Robert Richardson Jr. (born April 4, 1982) is an American retired stock car racing driver.

Richardson began driving at the Richard Petty Driving Experience and Team Texas Driving School at Texas Motor Speedway in 2002. He was runner-up in Rookie of the Year honors the following season in Romco Super Late Models. In 2004, he made his Automobile Racing Club of America debut at Chicagoland Speedway. He is a former quarterback at Southern Methodist University.

== Racing career ==
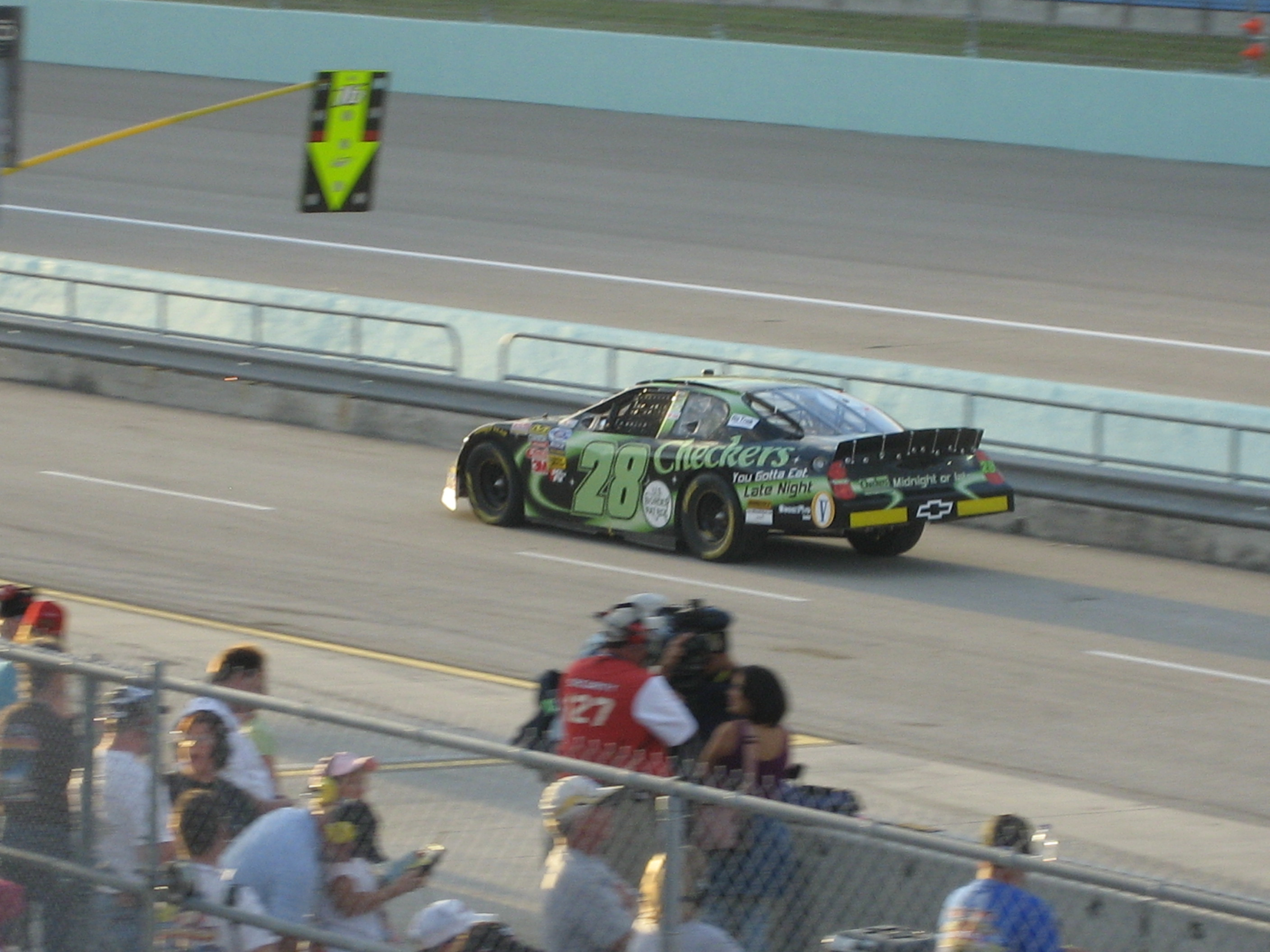
Richardson leaves pit road during the 2007 Ford 300.

Richardson made his NASCAR debut in the 2005 Las Vegas 350, driving the No. 24 Chevrolet Silverado for Mighty Motorsports in the Craftsman Truck Series. He started 35th and finished 29th, seven laps down. He ran two more races that season. During the off-season, he purchased equipment from Ultra Motorsports and formed his own team to compete for NASCAR Rookie of the Year honors in the No. 1 Chevrolet. He failed to qualify for five races, had a best finish of 16th at Talladega Superspeedway and ended up 30th in season points. His team reportedly shut down after the season ended.

In 2007, Richardson moved up to the NASCAR Busch Series, driving the No. 28 Chevrolet Monte Carlo for Jay Robinson Racing (JRR). He made 16 starts and finished 46th in points, with a best finish of 19th at Talladega Superspeedway. He signed with Robinson to drive the No. 4 Chevrolet at least 20 races for JRR in 2008, but he was released. Later that summer, he formed his own team with his father and Rob Fuller, and has driven the No. 23 team for them since. He shared the No. 23 with Ken Butler III in 2009, and also drove the No. 0 part-time for JD Motorsports.

Richardson ran the NASCAR Sprint Cup Series race at Talladega for Tommy Baldwin Racing; he finished 18th this was the best finish for Tommy Baldwin's team in the Sprint Cup in 2009 debut, the team start and parked for most of the season. Richardson ran four races for Front Row Motorsports in 2010; he also drove the No. 92 Dodge at the Sprint Showdown for Brian Keselowski.

Richardson ran the 2011 Daytona 500 in the No. 37 Front Row Motorsports Ford with sponsorship from North Texas Pipes, while running the majority of the NASCAR Nationwide Series schedule in 2011.

In 2012, Richardson attempted to qualify for the Daytona 500 in a family-owned No. 23 Toyota, but failed to make the field. He ran the 2013 DRIVE4COPD 300 in the No. 23 car to ninth place, his best career finish, and ran a limited schedule for the remainder of the year.

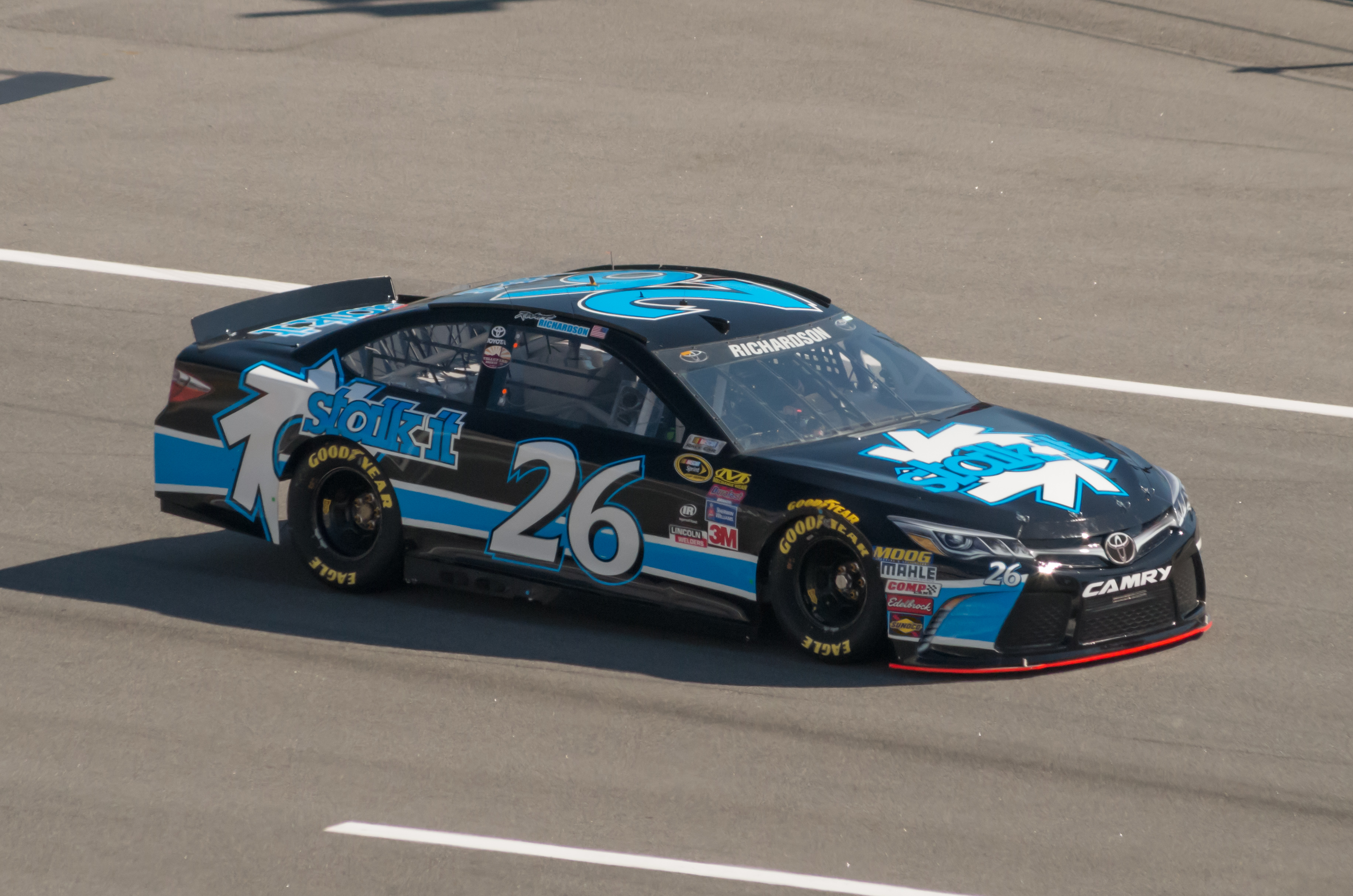
Richardson's 2016 Cup car for BK Racing

In 2016, Richardson returned to the Cup Series for the Daytona 500. He would drive the No. 26 car for BK Racing. Despite not being locked into the race due to his team not possessing a charter (which would have guaranteed his team a spot in the 500), Richardson was able to finish eighteenth in the second Can-Am Duel to qualify for the 500. As of 2026, he has not raced since.

== Motorsports career results ==
=== NASCAR ===
(key) (Bold – Pole position awarded by qualifying time. Italics – Pole position earned by points standings or practice time. * – Most laps led.)

==== Sprint Cup Series ====
NASCAR Sprint Cup Series results
Year	Team	No.	Make	1	2	3	4	5	6	7	8	9	10	11	12	13	14	15	16	17	18	19	20	21	22	23	24	25	26	27	28	29	30	31	32	33	34	35	36	NSCC	Pts	Ref
2009	Tommy Baldwin Racing	36	Toyota	DAY	CAL	LVS	ATL	BRI	MAR	TEX	PHO	TAL	RCH	DAR	CLT	DOV	POC	MCH	SON	NHA	DAY	CHI	IND	POC	GLN	MCH	BRI	ATL	RCH	NHA	DOV	KAN	CAL	CLT	MAR	TAL; 18	TEX	PHO	HOM	59th	109	
2010	Front Row Motorsports	38	Ford	DAY; 31	CAL	LVS	ATL	BRI	MAR	PHO	TEX																													54th	301	
2010	Front Row Motorsports	37	Ford									TAL; 26	RCH	DAR	DOV	CLT	POC	MCH	SON	NHA	DAY; 23	CHI	IND	POC	GLN	MCH	BRI	ATL	RCH	NHA	DOV	KAN	CAL	CLT	MAR					54th	301	
2010	Front Row Motorsports	34	Ford																																	TAL; 37	TEX	PHO	HOM	54th	301	
2011	Front Row Motorsports	37	Ford	DAY; 38	PHO	LVS	BRI	CAL	MAR	TEX	TAL	RCH	DAR	DOV	CLT	KAN	POC	MCH	SON	DAY	KEN	NHA	IND	POC	GLN	MCH	BRI	ATL	RCH	CHI	NHA	DOV	KAN	CLT	TAL	MAR	TEX	PHO	HOM	77th	0^{1}	
2012	R3 Motorsports	23	Toyota	DAY; DNQ	PHO	LVS	BRI	CAL	MAR	TEX	KAN	RCH	TAL; 27	DAR	CLT	DOV	POC	MCH	SON	KEN	DAY; DNQ	NHA	IND	POC	GLN	MCH	BRI	ATL	RCH	CHI	NHA	DOV	TAL; 35	CLT	KAN	MAR	TEX	PHO	HOM	68th	0^{1}	
2016	BK Racing	26	Toyota	DAY; 38	ATL	LVS	PHO	CAL	MAR	TEX	BRI	RCH	TAL	KAN	DOV	CLT	POC	MCH	SON	DAY	KEN	NHA	IND	POC	GLN	BRI	MCH	DAR	RCH	CHI	NHA	DOV	CLT	KAN	TAL	MAR	TEX	PHO	HOM	51st	3	

^{*} Season still in progress
^{1} Ineligible for series points

===== Daytona 500 =====
Year	Team	Manufacturer	Start	Finish
2010	Front Row Motorsports	Ford	37	31
2011	Front Row Motorsports	Ford	28	38
2012	R3 Motorsports	Toyota	DNQ	
2016	BK Racing	Toyota	40	38

==== Nationwide Series ====
NASCAR Nationwide Series results
Year	Team	No.	Make	1	2	3	4	5	6	7	8	9	10	11	12	13	14	15	16	17	18	19	20	21	22	23	24	25	26	27	28	29	30	31	32	33	34	35	NNSC	Pts	Ref
2006	Richardson Racing	80	Chevy	DAY	CAL	MXC	LVS	ATL	BRI	TEX	NSH	PHO	TAL	RCH	DAR	CLT	DOV	NSH	KEN	MLW	DAY	CHI	NHA	MAR	GTY	IRP	GLN	MCH	BRI	CAL	RCH	DOV	KAN	CLT; DNQ	MEM	TEX; DNQ	PHO	HOM; DNQ	N/A	0	
2007	Jay Robinson Racing	28	Chevy	DAY; 28	CAL	MXC	LVS	ATL	BRI	NSH; 31			TAL; 19	RCH	DAR	CLT	DOV; 36	NSH; 30	KEN; 34	MLW; 33	NHA; 39	DAY; 26	CHI	GTY; 22	IRP; 27	CGV	GLN	MCH	BRI; 38	CAL	RCH	DOV; 27	KAN	CLT	MEM; 31	TEX; 32	PHO	HOM; 36	46th	1146	
2007	Richardson Racing	80	Chevy								TEX; DNQ	PHO																											46th	1146	
2008	Jay Robinson Racing	4	Chevy	DAY; 31	CAL; 25	LVS; 19	ATL; 32	BRI; 32	NSH; 35	TEX; 29	PHO; 30	MXC	TAL; 19	RCH; 34	DAR																								45th	1105	
2008	R3 Motorsports	23	Chevy													CLT; 38	DOV	NSH	KEN	MLW	NHA	DAY; 32	CHI; DNQ	GTY	IRP	CGV	GLN	MCH; 35	BRI	CAL	RCH	DOV	KAN; 23	CLT; DNQ	MEM	TEX; 36	PHO	HOM; DNQ	45th	1105	
2009	R3 Motorsports	23	Chevy	DAY; 34	CAL		BRI; 29	TEX; 24	NSH	PHO	TAL; 16	RCH	DAR	CLT; 33	DOV	NSH; 21	KEN	MLW	NHA	DAY; 26	CHI; 28	GTY	IRP	IOW	GLN	MCH; 24	BRI	CGV	ATL; 22	RCH; 28	DOV	KAN; 22	CAL	CLT	MEM; 32	TEX; 26	PHO	HOM	41st	1248	
2009	R3 Motorsports	0	Chevy			LVS; 34																																	41st	1248	
2010	R3 Motorsports	23	Chevy	DAY; 25	CAL; 33	LVS; 26	BRI	NSH; 23	PHO	TEX; 23	TAL; 20	RCH	DAR	DOV; 35	CLT; 23	NSH; 27	KEN; 30	ROA	NHA; 27	DAY; 32	CHI; 31	GTY	IRP; 15	IOW; 23	GLN	MCH; 33	BRI; 28	CGV	ATL	RCH	DOV	KAN; 31	CAL; 26	CLT; 33	GTY	TEX; 27	PHO	HOM; 20	27th	1882	
2011	R3 Motorsports	23	Dodge	DAY; 32	PHO; 24	LVS; 22	BRI; 37	CAL; 29	TEX; 26	TAL; 28	NSH; 34	RCH; 20	DAR	DOV	IOW; 22	CLT; 36	CHI; 32	MCH; 31	ROA	DAY; 31																			24th	377	
2011	R3 Motorsports	23	Chevy																		KEN; 33	NHA	NSH	IRP	IOW; 23	GLN	CGV	BRI	ATL; 26	RCH; 22	CHI; 29	DOV	KAN	CLT; 30	TEX; 25	PHO; 22	HOM; 22		24th	377	
2012	R3 Motorsports	23	Chevy	DAY; 35	PHO	LVS; 24	BRI	CAL; 21	TEX; 34	RCH; 34	TAL; 26	DAR	IOW	CLT; 39	DOV	MCH	ROA	KEN	DAY; 17	NHA	CHI	IND; 31	IOW	GLN	CGV	BRI; 24	ATL; 31	RCH; 22	CHI	KEN	DOV	CLT; 20	KAN; 39	TEX; 27	PHO	HOM; 33			28th	248	
2013	R3 Motorsports	23	Chevy	DAY; 9	PHO	LVS; 29	BRI; 27	CAL	TEX; 31	RCH; 32	TAL; 20	DAR	CLT; 40	DOV	IOW	MCH	ROA	KEN	DAY; 32	NHA	CHI	IND; 30	IOW	GLN	MOH	BRI; 30	ATL; 25	RCH; 34	CHI	KEN	DOV	KAN	CLT; 27	TEX; 28	PHO	HOM			32nd	222	
2014	R3 Motorsports	23	Chevy	DAY; 38	PHO	LVS; 31	BRI	CAL	TEX; 34	DAR	RCH	TAL; 32	IOW	CLT	DOV	MCH	ROA	KEN	DAY; 40	NHA	CHI	IND; 32	IOW	GLN	MOH	BRI	ATL	RCH	CHI	KEN	DOV	KAN	CLT	TEX; 29	PHO	HOM			42nd	72	

==== Camping World Truck Series ====
NASCAR Camping World Truck Series results
Year	Team	No.	Make	1	2	3	4	5	6	7	8	9	10	11	12	13	14	15	16	17	18	19	20	21	22	23	24	25	NCWTC	Pts	Ref
2005	Mighty Motorsports	24	Chevy	DAY	CAL	ATL	MAR	GTY	MFD	CLT	DOV	TEX	MCH	MLW	KAN	KEN	MEM	IRP	NSH	BRI	RCH	NHA	LVS; 29	MAR	ATL				62nd	216	
2005	Maverick Motorsports	82	Chevy																							TEX; 28	PHO		62nd	216	
2005	Richardson Racing	35	Chevy																									HOM; 34	62nd	216	
2006	Richardson Racing	1	Dodge	DAY; 17	CAL; 33	ATL; 30	MAR; 28			MFD; 33																			30th	1514	
2006	Richardson Racing	1	Chevy					GTY; 36	CLT; DNQ		DOV; DNQ	TEX; 23	MCH; DNQ	MLW; 33	KAN; 27	KEN; DNQ	MEM; 36	IRP; 30	NSH; 27	BRI; 36	NHA; 36	LVS; 28	TAL; 16	MAR; 24	ATL; 27	TEX; 28	PHO; 34	HOM; DNQ	30th	1514	
2009	Rob Fuller Motorsports	71	Chevy	DAY	CAL	ATL	MAR	KAN	CLT	DOV	TEX	MCH	MLW	MEM	KEN	IRP	NSH	BRI	CHI	IOW	GTW	NHA	LVS	MAR	TAL	TEX; 35	PHO	HOM	109th	58	

=== ARCA Re/Max Series ===
(key) (Bold – Pole position awarded by qualifying time. Italics – Pole position earned by points standings or practice time. * – Most laps led.)

ARCA Re/Max Series results
Year	Team	No.	Make	1	2	3	4	5	6	7	8	9	10	11	12	13	14	15	16	17	18	19	20	21	22	23	ARMC	Pts	Ref
2004	Gerhart Racing	7	Pontiac	DAY	NSH	SLM	KEN	TOL	CLT	KAN	POC	MCH	SBO	BLN	KEN	GTW	POC	LER	NSH	ISF	TOL	DSF	CHI; 20	SLM	TAL		142nd	130	
2005	Richardson Racing	33	Ford	DAY; 26																							46th	755	
2005	Richardson Racing	33	Chevy		NSH; 14	SLM																					46th	755	
2005	Richardson Racing	56	Ford				KEN; 13	TOL	LAN	MIL	POC	MCH	KAN	KEN	BLN	POC											46th	755	
2005	Bob Schacht Motorsports	75	Ford														GTW; 19	LER	NSH	MCH; 23	ISF	TOL	DSF	CHI	SLM	TAL; DNQ	46th	755	
2005	Simko-Schacht Racing	45	Ford																							TAL; 30	46th	755	
