= 2012 Aaron's 499 =

Race details
- Race 10 of 36 in the 2012 NASCAR Sprint Cup Series
- Date: May 6, 2012
- Location: Talladega Superspeedway, Talladega, Alabama
- Course: Permanent racing facility
- Course length: 2.66 miles (4.28 km)
- Distance: 194 laps, 516.04 mi (830.824 km)
- Weather: Overcast with a temperature around 90 °F (32 °C); wind out of the W at 4 mph.
- Average speed: 160.192 miles per hour (257.804 km/h)

Pole position
Driver	Jeff Gordon	Hendrick Motorsports
- Time: 49.973

Most laps led
Driver	Matt Kenseth	Roush Fenway Racing
- Laps: 77

Winner
No. 2	Brad Keselowski	Penske Racing

Television in the United States
- Network: Fox Broadcasting Company
- Announcers: Mike Joy, Darrell Waltrip and Larry McReynolds

The 2012 Aaron's 499 was a NASCAR Sprint Cup Series stock car race held on May 6, 2012 at Talladega Superspeedway in Talladega, Alabama. Contested over 194 laps (with a green-white-checkered finish), it was the tenth race of the 2012 season. Brad Keselowski of Penske Racing took his second win of the season, while Kyle Busch finished second and Matt Kenseth finished third.

There were five cautions and thirty-five lead changes among nineteen different drivers throughout the course of the race. The result moved Keselowski into the twelfth position in the Drivers' Championship. He remained seventy-nine points behind of first place driver Greg Biffle and thirteen ahead of thirteen placed Ryan Newman. Chevrolet maintained its lead in the Manufacturers' Championship, five points ahead of Toyota and ten ahead of Ford, with twenty-six races remaining in the season.

== Report ==
=== Background ===
Talladega Superspeedway, the race track where the race was held.

The track, Talladega Superspeedway, is one of six superspeedways to hold NASCAR races, the others being Daytona International Speedway, Auto Club Speedway, Indianapolis Motor Speedway, Pocono Raceway and Michigan International Speedway. The standard track at the speedway is a four-turn superspeedway that is 2.66 miles (4.28 km) long. The track's turns are banked at thirty-three degrees, while the front stretch, the location of the finish line, is banked at 16.5 degrees. The back stretch has a two-degree banking. Talladega Superspeedway can seat up to 143,231 people.

Before the race, Greg Biffle led the Drivers' Championship with 338 points, and Dale Earnhardt Jr. stood in second with 333. Denny Hamlin was third in the Drivers' Championship with 329 points, one ahead of Matt Kenseth and thirteen ahead of Martin Truex Jr. in fourth and fifth. Jimmie Johnson with 314 was one ahead of Kevin Harvick, as Tony Stewart with 307 points, was twenty points ahead of Carl Edwards, and twenty-nine in front of Ryan Newman. In the Manufacturers' Championship, Chevrolet was leading with 60 points, eight ahead of Toyota. Ford, with 49 points, was twelve points ahead of Dodge in the battle for third. Johnson was the race's defending race winner after winning it in 2011.

=== Practice and qualifying ===
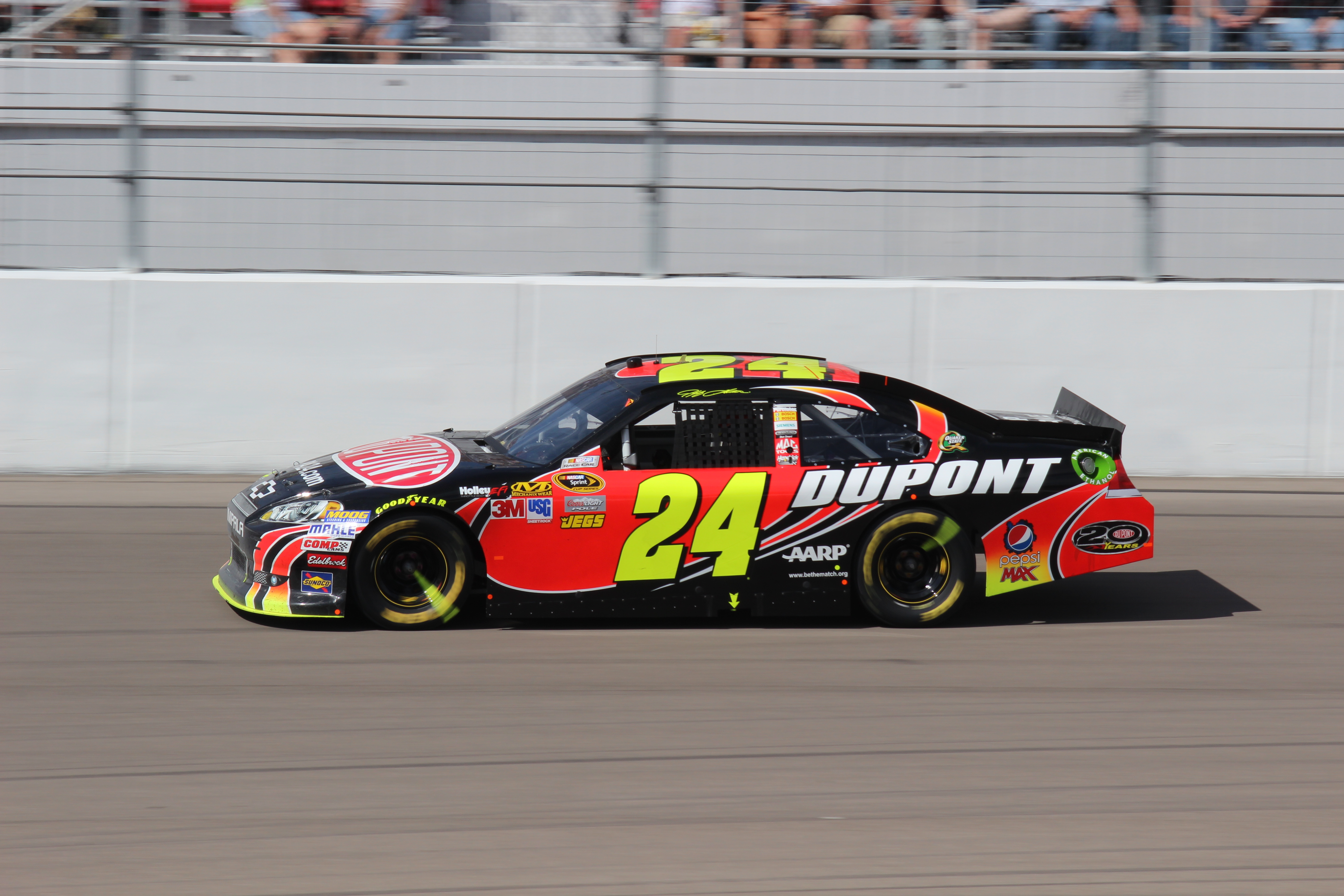
Jeff Gordon (Las Vegas car shown) won the pole position with a time of 49.973 seconds.

Two practice sessions were held before the race on Friday. The first session was 45 minutes long, while the second lasted 60 minutes. Aric Almirola was quickest with a time of 48.079 seconds in the first session, two-tenths of a second faster than Michael Waltrip. Kenseth was third, followed by Jeff Gordon, Harvick, and Brad Keselowski. Casey Mears was seventh, still within half of a second of Almirola's time. In the second practice session, Almirola remained quickest with a time of 48.677. Kenseth followed Almirola in the second position with a time of 48.687 seconds, 0.010 seconds slower. Biffle was third quickest, ahead of Hamlin, Regan Smith, and David Gilliland. Joey Logano followed in the seventh position with a time of 49.078 seconds.

Forty-four cars were entered for qualifying, but only forty-three would race because of NASCAR's qualifying procedure. Gordon clinched the seventy-first pole position of his career with a time of 49.973 seconds, the only qualifying lap under 50 seconds. Gordon qualified differently from most of the other drivers, hoping to keep his engine cool through the qualifying laps. A. J. Allmendinger qualified 0.135 seconds behind and joined Gordon on the front row of the grid. Marcos Ambrose took third place, ahead of Almirola and Kahne in the fourth and fifth positions. Championship leader, Biffle qualified sixth, while Edwards followed in seventh. Stewart, Waltrip and Kenseth completed the first ten positions. J. J. Yeley failed to qualify for the race after positing a time of 51.402 seconds.

Following the qualifying session, Gordon stated, "That's quite an accomplishment. I'm just so proud of this DuPont Chevy team. We needed something to boost our morale and something positive because we've had a rough year so far. This is a surprise. We did not expect to be sitting here now talking to you about a pole, and I think it's ironice that we've got the DuPont paint scheme, which is celebrating 20 years and then we win a pole for the 20th straight year."

=== Race ===
The race, the tenth in the season, started 2:05 p.m. EDT and was televised live in the United States on Fox. The conditions on the grid were wet before the race and overcast skies are expected. Rain showers before the scheduled start time of 1 p.m. EDT delayed the event by 45 minutes to 2:05 p.m. EDT.

At the drop of the green flag on lap 1, polesitter Jeff Gordon maintained his lead, but was soon passed on the backstretch by the Richard Petty Motorsports tandem of Marcos Ambrose and Aric Almirola. By the time the field returned to the finish line, Matt Kenseth had shoved Tony Stewart to the lead. Stewart led until lap 16, when the first caution of the day waved after Regan Smith's engine blew. Most of the drivers pitted under the caution, and A. J. Allmendinger was penalized for speeding on pit road. Kenseth led the field at the restart on lap 20. On lap 25, Denny Hamlin pushed Michael Waltrip to the lead. Waltrip continued to lead until lap 46 when he was passed by Jimmie Johnson and Dale Earnhardt Jr. During this time, Newman retired to the garage on lap 44 on a mechanical problem. Waltrip dropped to fourth on lap 48 as he was passed by Kurt Busch.

On lap 52, Matt Kenseth reclaimed the lead, though he reported a vibration in his car five laps later. The field cycled through green flag pit stops from lap 58 to lap 62. On lap 64, Dale Earnhardt Jr. claimed the lead. One lap later, Jimmie Johnson's car returned to the garage for a broken oil pump belt. On lap 67, Kenseth picked up Earnhardt in turn 4. The two cars gained some headway until lap 72, where a scramble for the lead sent Earnhardt back from first place to 19th place in the course of three laps, while Jeff Gordon dropped back from third to tenth place, and Kenseth claimed the lead. On lap 81, Michael Waltrip got alongside Kenseth and dueled him for several laps. On lap 87, Waltrip gave Kasey Kahne a shove to the lead. Kahne retained the lead until lap 94 when Juan Pablo Montoya pulled up alongside him. The two cars maintained the lead until another round of green flag pit stops from lap 99 to 106. Paul Menard momentarily held the lead during the cycle before he pitted.

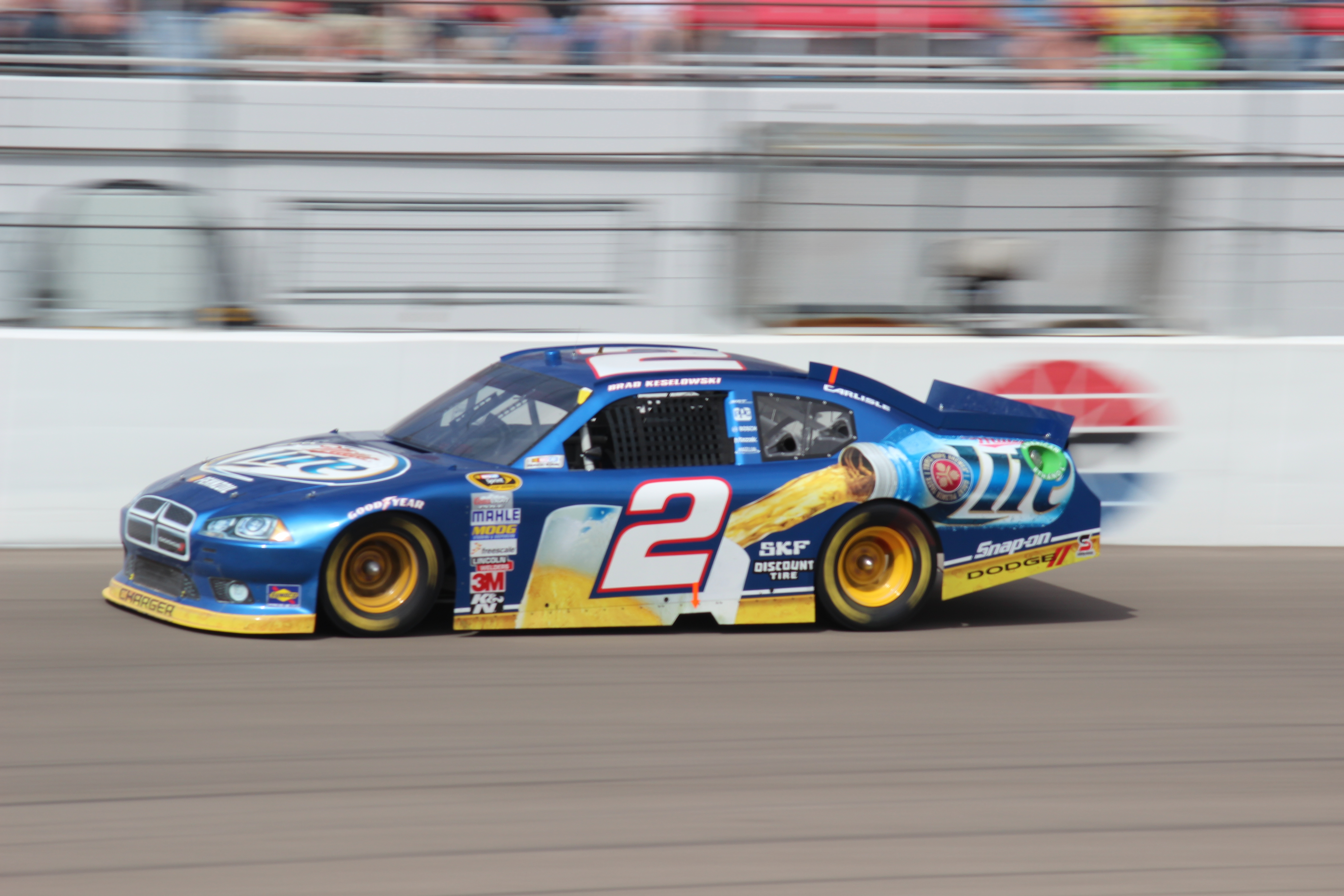
Brad Keselowski (Las Vegas car shown) won the race, which was his second of the season.

On lap 106, Greg Biffle took the lead. On lap 111, Kenseth pushed Jeff Burton to the lead alongside Biffle. On lap 120, Kurt Busch claimed the lead. He maintained this lead for two laps, when Biffle pushed Kenseth around Busch. Kenseth retained the lead until lap 136, where Kurt Busch momentarily maintained the lead on the first two turns but was repassed by Kenseth on the back straightaway. At lap 141, Busch and Harvick ran out of fuel. As they coasted down the apron on the back straightaway, the second caution flag was waved for a nine car wreck in turns 3 and 4. It started when Aric Almirola, trying to get back above the yellow line, knocked Dave Blaney into the wall. Several more cars piled in: Landon Cassill, Jeff Gordon, Carl Edwards, Martin Truex Jr., Joey Logano, Juan Pablo Montoya, and Terry Labonte. Kenseth and Marcos Ambrose entered the pits after the caution flag waved and the pit road closed. As a result, they and several other drivers, including Kurt Busch and Bobby Labonte - were moved to the back of the field when the race restarted on lap 150. Paul Menard assumed the lead

Two laps later, Brad Keselowski claimed the lead. On lap 159, Denny Hamlin passed Keselowski for the lead. With help from Kenseth, Casey Mears passed Hamlin three laps later, but was repassed by Hamlin a lap later. On lap 166, Keselowski returned Kenseth to the lead. On lap 175, the third caution was waved after Casey Mears cut a tire and spun in turn 2, also brushing and spinning out Trevor Bayne as he came down the banking. Denny Hamlin, Michael Waltrip, Clint Bowyer and Jamie McMurray pitted on lap 176. Kenseth led at the restart on lap 179.

On lap 181, the fourth caution waved as Kurt Busch spun out in the tri-oval off of Brad Keselowski's bumper. In a notorious move, Busch drove wrong way back to the pits instead of going around the circuit, but was still scored on the lead lap. On the lap 184 restart, Kenseth continued to maintain the lead. Barely had the cars made it down the straightaway when another wreck happened as drivers shuffled around. The drivers involved in the wreck were Menard, Hamlin, Biffle, Waltrip, Harvick, Burton, Robert Richardson Jr., Stewart, and Logano. While driving back to pit road, the left rear tire on Hamlin's car disintegrated, shredding the fender and a panel onto the track. At the green flag on lap 193, Biffle pushed Kenseth clear to the lead. However, Biffle fell back on the backstretch, allowing Keselowski to take the lead with help from Kyle Busch. Keselowski held off Busch, Kenseth and Biffle to win his second Talladega race.

== Results ==
=== Qualifying ===
Grid	No.	Driver	Team	Manufacturer	Time	Speed
1	24	Jeff Gordon	Hendrick Motorsports	Chevrolet	49.973	191.624
2	22	A. J. Allmendinger	Penske Racing	Dodge	50.107	191.111
3	9	Marcos Ambrose	Richard Petty Motorsports	Ford	50.126	191.039
4	43	Aric Almirola	Richard Petty Motorsports	Ford	50.141	190.981
5	5	Kasey Kahne	Hendrick Motorsports	Chevrolet	50.196	190.772
6	16	Greg Biffle	Roush Fenway Racing	Ford	50.245	190.586
7	99	Carl Edwards	Roush Fenway Racing	Ford	50.245	190.586
8	14	Tony Stewart	Stewart–Haas Racing	Chevrolet	50.274	190.476
9	55	Michael Waltrip	Michael Waltrip Racing	Toyota	50.335	190.245
10	17	Matt Kenseth	Roush Fenway Racing	Ford	50.347	190.200
11	21	Trevor Bayne	Wood Brothers Racing	Ford	50.355	190.170
12	42	Juan Pablo Montoya	Earnhardt Ganassi Racing	Chevrolet	50.363	190.140
13	2	Brad Keselowski	Penske Racing	Dodge	50.381	190.072
14	39	Ryan Newman	Stewart–Haas Racing	Chevrolet	50.383	190.064
15	56	Martin Truex Jr.	Michael Waltrip Racing	Toyota	50.411	189.958
16	26	Josh Wise	Front Row Motorsports	Ford	50.411	189.958
17	27	Paul Menard	Richard Childress Racing	Chevrolet	50.425	189.906
18	88	Dale Earnhardt Jr.	Hendrick Motorsports	Chevrolet	50.436	189.864
19	48	Jimmie Johnson	Hendrick Motorsports	Chevrolet	50.454	189.797
20	29	Kevin Harvick	Richard Childress Racing	Chevrolet	50.457	189.785
21	18	Kyle Busch	Joe Gibbs Racing	Toyota	50.482	189.691
22	11	Denny Hamlin	Joe Gibbs Racing	Toyota	50.485	189.680
23	1	Jamie McMurray	Earnhardt Ganassi Racing	Chevrolet	50.506	189.601
24	15	Clint Bowyer	Michael Waltrip Racing	Toyota	50.518	189.556
25	13	Casey Mears	Germain Racing	Ford	50.539	189.477
26	38	David Gilliland	Front Row Motorsports	Ford	50.572	189.354
27	30	David Stremme	Inception Motorsports	Toyota	50.578	189.331
28	32	Terry Labonte	FAS Lane Racing	Ford	50.618	189.182
29	31	Jeff Burton	Richard Childress Racing	Chevrolet	50.640	189.100
30	20	Joey Logano	Joe Gibbs Racing	Toyota	50.647	189.073
31	78	Regan Smith	Furniture Row Racing	Chevrolet	50.653	189.051
32	34	David Ragan	Front Row Motorsports	Ford	50.661	189.021
33	51	Kurt Busch	Phoenix Racing	Chevrolet	50.671	188.984
34	10	David Reutimann	Tommy Baldwin Racing	Chevrolet	50.693	188.902
35	98	Michael McDowell	Phil Parsons Racing	Ford	50.766	188.630
36	97	Bill Elliott	NEMCO Motorsports	Toyota	50.890	188.171
37	87	Joe Nemechek	NEMCO Motorsports	Toyota	50.933	188.012
38	36	Dave Blaney	Tommy Baldwin Racing	Chevrolet	51.038	187.625
39	23	Robert Richardson Jr.	R3 Motorsports	Toyota	51.288	186.710
40	83	Landon Cassill	BK Racing	Toyota	51.403	186.293
41	93	Travis Kvapil	BK Racing	Toyota	51.427	186.206
42	47	Bobby Labonte	JTG Daugherty Racing	Toyota	51.542	185.790
43	33	Tony Raines	Circle Sport	Chevrolet	51.338	186.529
Failed to Qualify
	49	J. J. Yeley	Robinson-Blakeney Racing	Toyota	51.402	186.296

=== Race results ===
Pos	Grid	Car	Driver	Team	Manufacturer	Laps	Points
1	13	2	Brad Keselowski	Penske Racing	Dodge	194	47
2	21	18	Kyle Busch	Joe Gibbs Racing	Toyota	194	43
3	10	17	Matt Kenseth	Roush Fenway Racing	Ford	194	43
4	5	5	Kasey Kahne	Hendrick Motorsports	Chevrolet	194	41
5	6	16	Greg Biffle	Roush Fenway Racing	Ford	194	40
6	24	15	Clint Bowyer	Michael Waltrip Racing	Toyota	194	38
7	32	34	David Ragan	Front Row Motorsports	Ford	194	37
8	11	21	Trevor Bayne	Wood Brothers Racing	Ford	194	0
9	18	88	Dale Earnhardt Jr.	Hendrick Motorsports	Chevrolet	194	36
10	29	31	Jeff Burton	Richard Childress Racing	Chevrolet	194	35
11	23	1	Jamie McMurray	Earnhardt Ganassi Racing	Chevrolet	194	33
12	4	43	Aric Almirola	Richard Petty Motorsports	Ford	194	32
13	26	38	David Gilliland	Front Row Motorsports	Ford	194	31
14	3	9	Marcos Ambrose	Richard Petty Motorsports	Ford	194	30
15	2	22	A. J. Allmendinger	Penske Racing	Dodge	194	29
16	41	93	Travis Kvapil	BK Racing	Toyota	194	29
17	17	27	Paul Menard	Richard Childress Racing	Chevrolet	194	28
18	25	13	Casey Mears	Germain Racing	Ford	194	27
19	9	55	Michael Waltrip	Michael Waltrip Racing	Toyota	194	26
20	33	51	Kurt Busch	Phoenix Racing	Chevrolet	194	25
21	42	47	Bobby Labonte	JTG Daugherty Racing	Toyota	192	23
22	34	10	David Reutimann	Tommy Baldwin Racing	Chevrolet	192	22
23	22	11	Denny Hamlin	Joe Gibbs Racing	Toyota	192	22
24	8	14	Tony Stewart	Stewart–Haas Racing	Chevrolet	190	21
25	20	29	Kevin Harvick	Richard Childress Racing	Chevrolet	184	20
26	30	20	Joey Logano	Joe Gibbs Racing	Toyota	184	18
27	39	23	Robert Richardson Jr.	R3 Motorsports	Toyota	182	0
28	15	56	Martin Truex Jr.	Michael Waltrip Racing	Toyota	166	16
29	28	32	Terry Labonte	FAS Lane Racing	Ford	143	15
30	38	36	Dave Blaney	Tommy Baldwin Racing	Chevrolet	142	14
31	7	99	Carl Edwards	Roush Fenway Racing	Ford	142	13
32	12	42	Juan Pablo Montoya	Earnhardt Ganassi Racing	Chevrolet	142	13
33	1	24	Jeff Gordon	Hendrick Motorsports	Chevrolet	142	11
34	40	83	Landon Cassill	BK Racing	Toyota	141	10
35	19	48	Jimmie Johnson	Hendrick Motorsports	Chevrolet	61	10
36	14	39	Ryan Newman	Stewart–Haas Racing	Chevrolet	42	8
37	36	97	Bill Elliott	NEMCO Motorsports	Toyota	37	7
38	43	33	Tony Raines	Circle Sport	Chevrolet	32	6
39	27	30	David Stremme	Inception Motorsports	Toyota	30	5
40	31	78	Regan Smith	Furniture Row Racing	Chevrolet	15	4
41	37	87	Joe Nemechek	NEMCO Motorsports	Toyota	7	0
42	16	26	Josh Wise	Front Row Motorsports	Ford	5	2
43	35	98	Michael McDowell	Phil Parsons Racing	Ford	2	1

== Standings after the race ==
Drivers' Championship standings

Pos	Driver	Points
1	Greg Biffle	378
2	Matt Kenseth	371
3	Dale Earnhardt Jr.	369
4	Denny Hamlin	351
5	Kevin Harvick	333

Manufacturers' Championship standings

Pos	Manufacturer	Points
1	Chevrolet	63
2	Toyota	58
3	Ford	53
4	Dodge	46

- Note: Only the top five positions are included for the driver standings.

Previous race: 2012 Capital City 400	Sprint Cup Series; 2012 season	Next race: 2012 Bojangles' Southern 500
