= 2010 Coke Zero 400 =

2010 Coke Zero 400 Powered by Coca-Cola
Race details
- Race 18 of 36 in the 2010 NASCAR Sprint Cup Series
- The 2010 Coke Zero 400 program cover, featuring Tony Stewart.
- Date: July 3–4, 2010
- Official name: Coke Zero 400 Powered by Coca-Cola
- Location: Daytona International Speedway in Daytona Beach, Florida.
- Course: Permanent racing facility
- Course length: 2.5 miles (4 km)
- Distance: 166 / 160 laps, 415 / 400 mi (668 / 643.7 km)
- Weather: Scattered T-storms with a high around 86; wind out of the ENE at 10 mph. There is a 40% chance of precipitation.
- Average speed: 130.814 miles per hour (210.525 km/h)

Pole position
Driver	Kevin Harvick	Richard Childress Racing

Most laps led
Driver	Kevin Harvick	Richard Childress Racing
- Laps: 28

Winner
No. 29	Kevin Harvick	Richard Childress Racing

Television in the United States
- Network: Turner Network Television
- Announcers: Adam Alexander, Wally Dallenbach Jr. and Kyle Petty

The 2010 Coke Zero 400 Powered by Coca-Cola, the 52nd running of the event, was a NASCAR Sprint Cup Series race held on July 3, 2010, at Daytona International Speedway in Daytona Beach, Florida as the 18th race – and official halfway point – of the 2010 NASCAR Sprint Cup Series season. It was scheduled to begin at 7:30 p.m. EDT, but began at 9:24 US EDT due to a rain delay the race began. It was telecast on TNT and Motor Racing Network (terrestrial) and SiriusXM (satellite) by radio at 6:30 p.m. EDT.

That was first plate race without the 2002 winner Michael Waltrip and he was rumored to run the No. 15 NAPA Auto Parts Toyota with his 2001 Daytona 500 winning throwback, but however he did not enter the race.

Kevin Harvick won the race, while Kasey Kahne finished second and Jeff Gordon finished third. There were a total of nine cautions, one red flag, and 47 lead changes among 18 different drivers.

This was also the final race at Daytona on the pavement surface used since 1979. Re-paving the track was moved up two years due to pothole problems in the 2010 Daytona 500. Several preventive repairs were made between practice and qualifying sessions, but there were no delays at any time through the weekend because of potholes. Repaving began almost immediately after the race.

== Report ==
=== Background ===
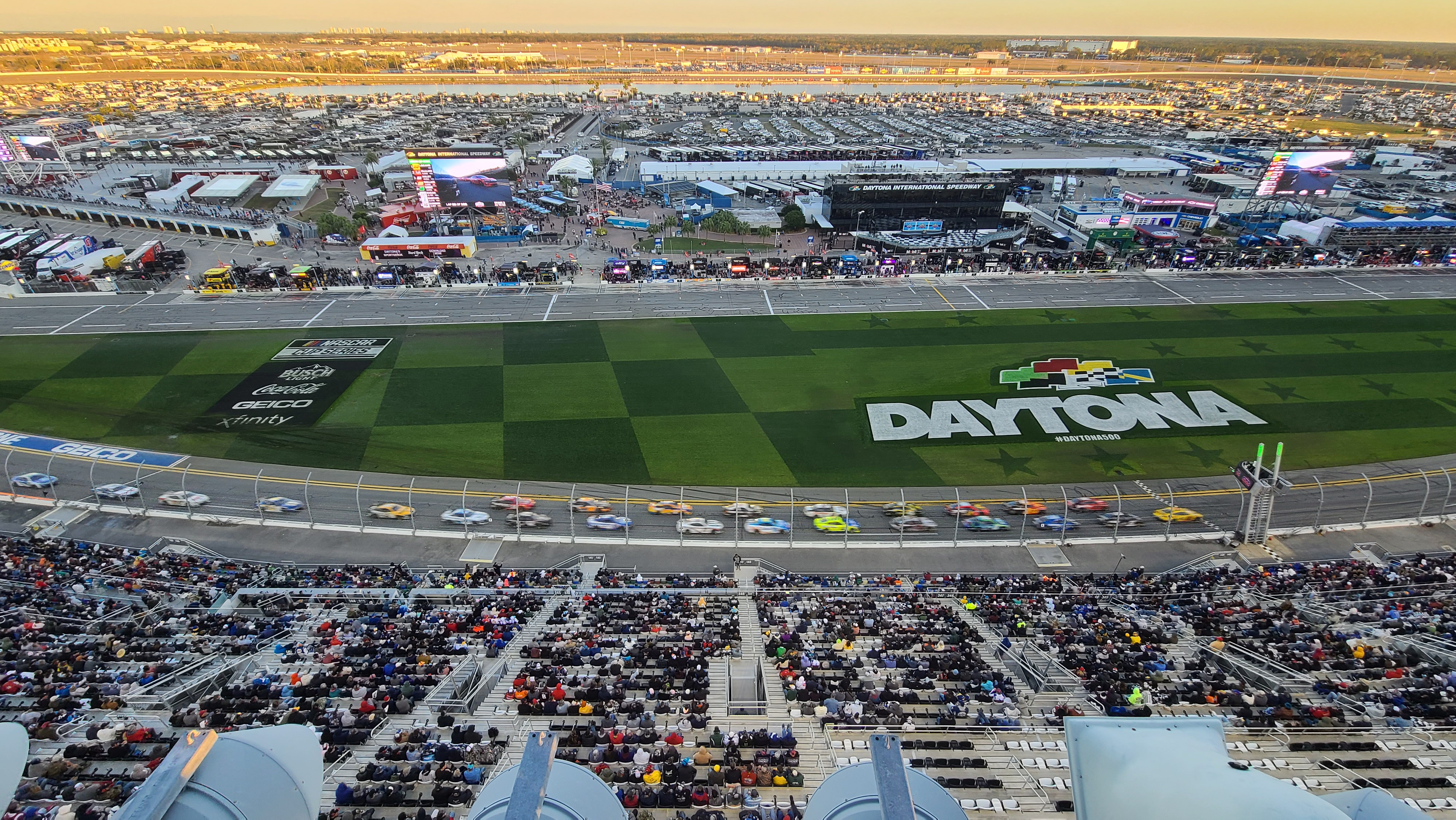
View of cars racing on the front stretch at the 2024 Daytona 500, held at Daytona International Speedway.

Prior to the race, Richard Childress Racing driver Kevin Harvick led the Drivers' Championship with 2,489 points, and Hendrick Motorsports driver Jimmie Johnson was second with 2,384 points. Behind them in the Drivers' Championship, Kyle Busch was third with 2,328 points in a Toyota, and Kyle Busch's teammate Denny Hamlin was fourth with 2,304 points. Jeff Gordon was fifth with 2,302 points. In the Manufacturers' Championship, Chevrolet was leading with 121 points, fourteen points ahead of their rival Toyota. In the battle for third place, Dodge had 74 points, two points ahead of Ford.

=== Practice and qualifying ===
Two practice sessions were held on Thursday before the Saturday race. The first session lasted 80 minutes, and the Thursday evening session lasted 85 minutes. During the first practice session, Kyle Busch and David Ragan collided to bring out the caution flag as Joey Logano was quickest. Clint Bowyer was in the second position, ahead of Ryan Newman and Matt Kenseth, while Tony Stewart was scored fifth. In the evening session, Robby Gordon was quickest, after Logano spun sideways. There was another caution later in the session, involving Denny Hamlin, Kyle Busch, Stewart, and Reed Sorenson. Greg Biffle was scored in second, ahead of Marcos Ambrose and Kasey Kahne in third and fourth. A. J. Allmendinger ended up fifth quickest.

During qualifying, forty-five cars were entered, but only forty-three was able to race because of NASCAR's qualifying procedure. Only twelve cars were able to qualify because of wet conditions. Kevin Harvick earned the pole position, because of being the points leader. He was joined on the front row of the grid by Jimmie Johnson, who was second in the point standings. Kyle Busch was third, as his teammate Hamlin was supposed to start in fourth, but had to go to the rear of the grid because of switching to a back-up car. Jeff Gordon started fourth, after being eighth in the second practice session. Kurt Busch, Kenseth, Jeff Burton, Stewart, Biffle, and Dale Earnhardt Jr. rounded off the top ten. The two drivers that did not qualify were Michael McDowell and Todd Bodine.

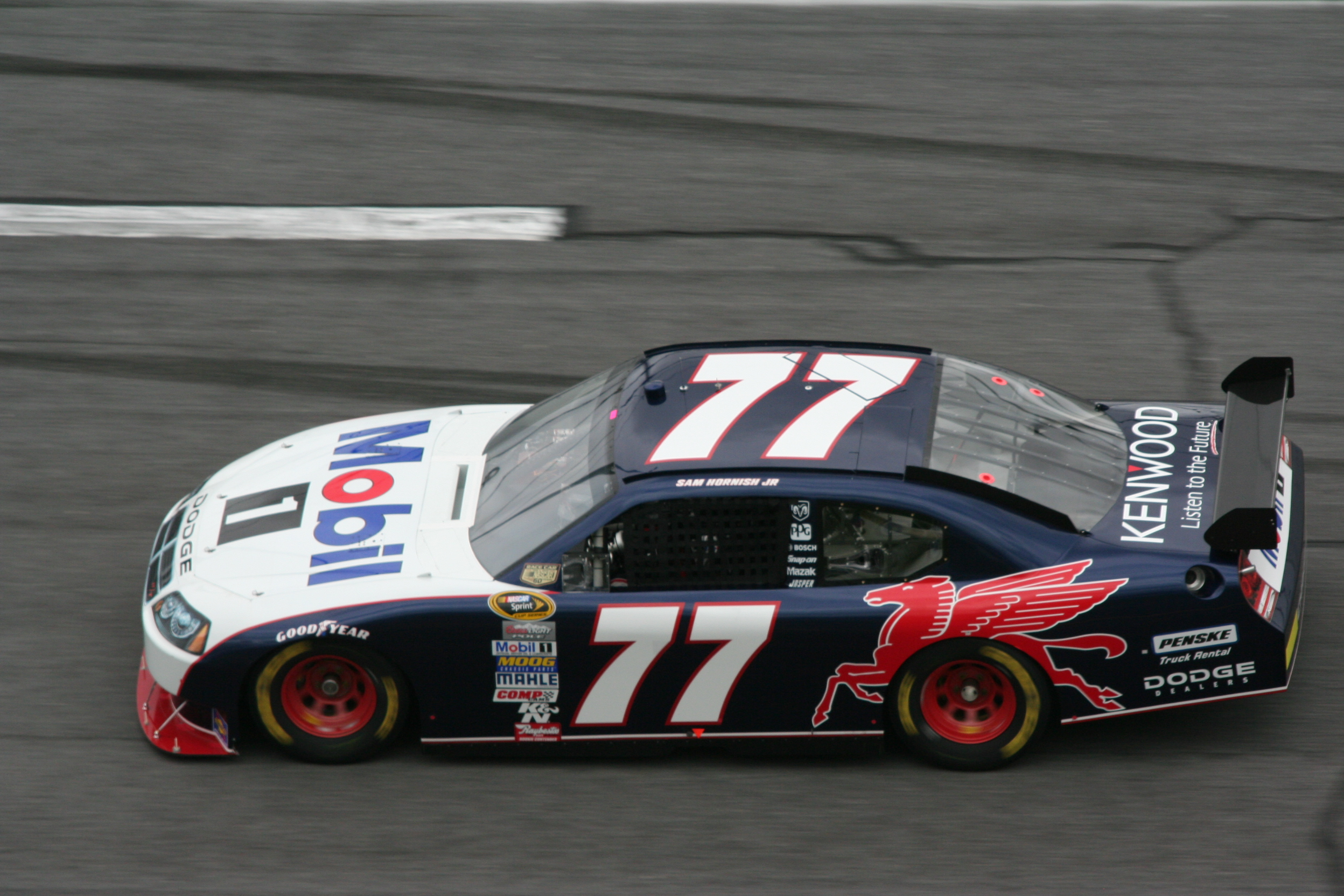
Sam Hornish Jr. was fastest out of the twelve cars that qualified before qualifying was cancelled.

=== Race summary ===
In comparison to Friday's wet qualifying session, frequent showers soaked the track Saturday evening, making racing slippery and potentially hazardous which delayed the start of the race until 9:24 US EDT. However, pre-race ceremonies continued, as Pastor Corwin Lasenby Sr., from New Mt. Zion Missionary Baptist Church delivered the invocation. Then, Capitol Records Nashville recording artist Darius Rucker performed the United States National Anthem. By 8:13, forty-three minutes after the scheduled start time, the showers had moved away, and dryers started to dry the track. 43 minutes later, crew members and the drivers were called to pit road. Bobby Labonte ended pre-race ceremonies, giving the command from his Coke Zero-sponsored Phoenix Racing Chevrolet.

Kevin Harvick and Jimmie Johnson stayed side-by-side going through the first turn, but Johnson maintained a steady pace and passed Harvick. Jeff Gordon moved into 3rd, after starting in the 5th position. Johnson's vacated 2nd position was filled by Kyle Busch as Jeff Burton moved into the 8th spot. On lap 5, Harvick passed Johnson to begin leading the race. By lap 7, Johnson had fallen 3 places, as his teammate Gordon moved into the 3rd position. Three laps later, Gordon claimed the lead as Harvick battled him for it. Gordon fell to 13th after two laps since he claimed the lead. Greg Biffle, now 2nd, passed Harvick for the 1st position on lap 14. One lap later, Busch claimed the lead, as the competition caution decided by NASCAR officials, was displayed. While under caution, Max Papis and Dave Blaney exited the track to go to their garage stalls due to vibration and transmission problems.

Harvick led on the restart, from entering the track from pit road in first. Brad Keselowski climbed to 3rd a lap after starting 26th, as Elliott Sadler moved to the 3rd position. Harvick's vacated first position was taken by Sadler, as Busch improved his position to 2nd on the grid. Four laps later, Busch became the new leader, but Sadler would reclaim it during lap 29, when Busch had to make a pit stop. On lap 30, Busch's brother Kurt became the leader, as Sam Hornish Jr. moved into 2nd. Harvick reclaimed the lead on lap 32, but Ku. Busch maintained a position and became the new leader. Harvick dropped to 7th two laps later. Johnson moved to 4th, after passing Hornish Jr. Soon after, Sadler reclaimed the 2nd position, as David Reutimann followed. On lap 41, Sadler became the new leader. Seven laps later, Johnson made a pit stop because of a tire problem, and Hornish Jr. took the lead on lap 50.

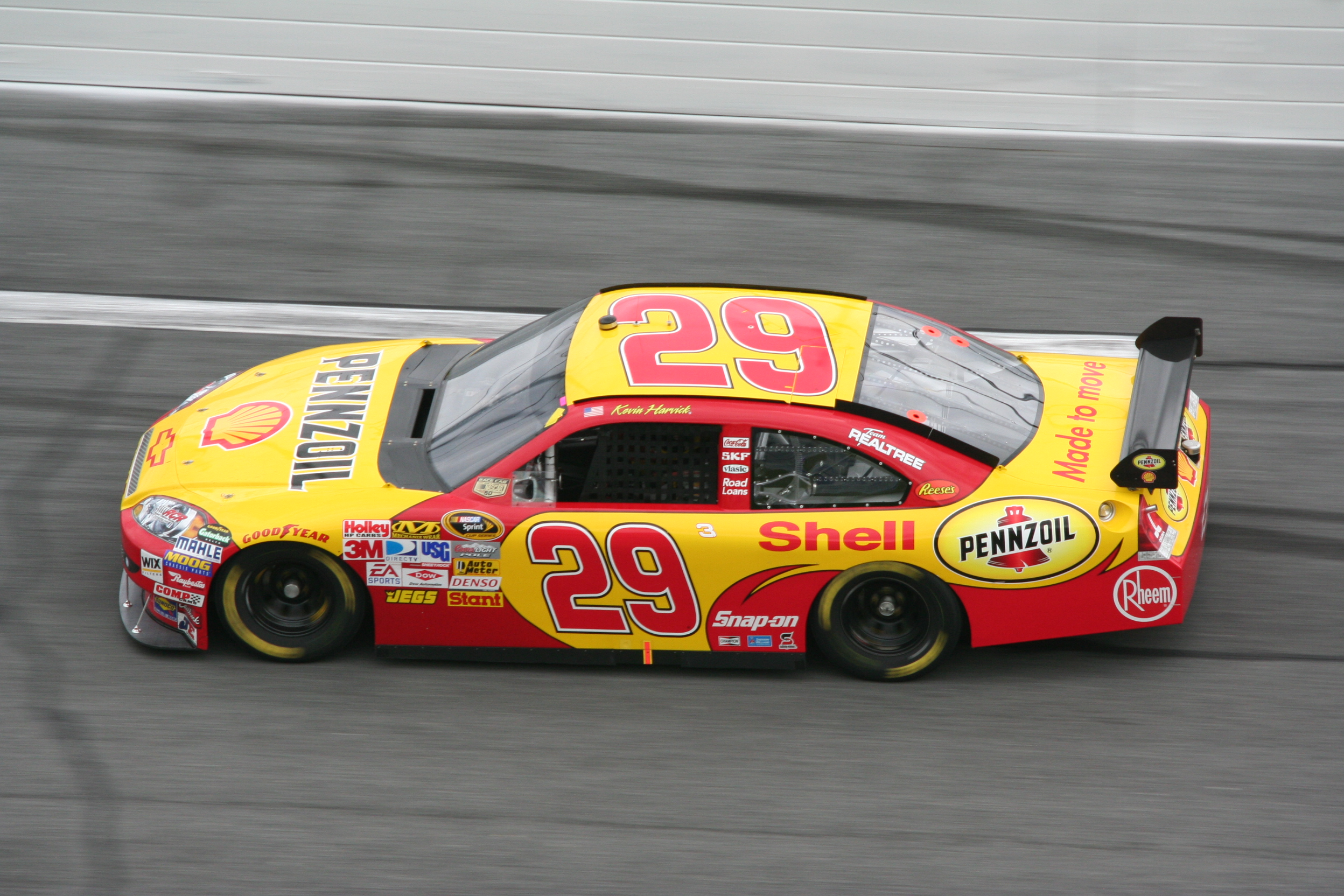
Kevin Harvick remained the Drivers' Championship leader after winning the race.

On lap 52, Matt Kenseth made a pit stop, as Ku. Busch passed Sadler for 2nd. Sadler fell to 4th on the next lap while Gordon and Juan Pablo Montoya moved into the 5th and 2nd positions. On lap 56, Montoya became the new leader, and J. J. Yeley had a flat tire, as drivers began to pit. As Montoya made a pit stop, debris from Yeley's race car brought out a caution on the next lap. The green flag returned on lap 63, as Gordon passed Montoya for first. On the following lap, A. J. Allmendinger collided with Ky. Busch, turned backwards, and collided with the wall. Gordon led the driver to the green flag on lap 69, but Keselowski led lap 70 after passing Gordon. Gordon reclaimed the lead after passing Keselowski. Then, Montoya reclaimed the lead from Gordon on lap 74.

Montoya led 2 laps before he was passed by Denny Hamlin. After 3 laps of leading, Hamlin was passed by Hornish Jr. on lap 79. Jamie McMurray moved into the 4th position on lap 85, after passing Montoya. With some help from Johnson, Ky. Busch claimed the lead one lap later. On lap 93, Burton passed Montoya for the 3rd position, then he passed Johnson 1 lap afterward. On lap 99, there were several pit stops that included Hornish, Keselowski, Ku. Busch, Reutimann, Gordon, and Sadler. Four laps later, Montoya and Ky. Busch collided with each other, causing the 18 car to turn sideways and crash into the wall, which brought out the 4th caution. Since Ky. Busch was the leader, Burton took his vacated first position. Mark Martin led the drivers to the green flag on lap 110, but Montoya passed him a lap later.

On lap 116, the fifth yellow flag was given. This happened when David Ragan, McMurray; and Martin Truex Jr. crashed into the wall when Ragan turned sideways. Tony Stewart led the field of drivers to green flag conditions on lap 121. During laps 126–134, there were several lead changes; the leaders were Burton, Clint Bowyer, and Harvick, then Burton took the lead. On lap 136, the sixth caution came out when Robert Richardson Jr. and David Stremme run into each other and turned sideways. Ku. Busch led the drivers to green, but Martin and Matt Kenseth both crashed into the wall, bringing out the seventh caution. Harvick led the drivers to the green flag on lap 145, but he couldn't keep Bowyer behind him. Two laps later, the race was red flagged for a large wreck involving 21 cars in turn 3, the largest crash since 2005. This began when Ku. Busch hit into Burton and ran him into Sam Hornish Jr. while behind them, Montoya turned Brad Keselowski into Reed Sorenson and Johnson. The smoke from the two collisions reduced visibility to the point that most of the field was collected behind them. Only a few drivers made it through cleanly. Mark Martin, who had damage from the crash that had brought out the seventh caution, hit the wall hardly, and Johnson's pit crew ran over from their stall to pull Martin out of his burning car when he came to pit road. The drivers involved included Burton, Ryan Newman, Bobby Labonte; Hornish Jr., Robby Gordon, Scott Speed, Greg Biffle, Paul Menard, Ku. Busch, Montoya, Keselowski, Regan Smith, Sorenson, Johnson, Joey Logano, Martin, Marcos Ambrose, and Stewart. Dale Earnhardt Jr. also collected minor damage to the right side of his car weaving through the wreckage. Bowyer stayed out to lead the drivers to the green flag on lap 152.

Two laps later, J. Gordon climbed into the 2nd position, as Harvick followed. On lap 157, Jeff Gordon claimed the lead. Two laps later, Bowyer reclaimed the lead, as the ninth caution was given because Ku. Busch; Hornish Jr.; and Sadler all ran into each other. 4 laps after the scheduled distance the green flag waved, as Bowyer led. On the last lap, Harvick passed Bowyer and crossed the finish line first to win his 2nd race in the 2010 season. Kasey Kahne finished 2nd, ahead of J. Gordon in 3rd. Kurt Busch finished seventh after three accidents in the last twelve laps.

=== Post-Race ===
Kevin Harvick appeared in victory lane after his victory lap to start celebrating his fourth win. In the subsequent press conference, Harvick said, "We're in a fortunate position with the start to our season, and we need to keep trying to make things better, you've just got to make it happen at the right time."

Harvick expressed his enjoyment of winning the race, but he also stated:

Daytona has been one of those magical places for us since we started coming here, I don't really care about the trophy. I want some of that pavement from the start/finish line out there. This is pretty cool.

"I got behind Harvick and I thought that would be the spot, I was watching Jeff (Gordon) because I knew he would be coming and would be quick. It would have been nice to get our Budweiser Ford in Victory Lane," said Kasey Kahne following his second-place finish. The race result left Kevin Harvick leading the Driver's Championship with 2,684 points. Jeff Gordon was second with 2,472, thirteen points ahead of Jimmie Johnson and thirty-three ahead of Kurt Busch. Denny Hamlin was fifth with 2,400 points. In the Manufacturers' Championship, Chevrolet maintained their lead with 130 points. Toyota remained second with 110 points. Dodge followed with 78 points, even with Ford in fourth.

== Race results ==
Pos	Grid	Car	Driver	Team	Manufacturer	Laps	Progress
1	1	29	Kevin Harvick	Richard Childress Racing	Chevrolet	166	Running
2	20	9	Kasey Kahne	Richard Petty Motorsports	Ford	166	Running
3	5	24	Jeff Gordon	Hendrick Motorsports	Chevrolet	166	Running
4	13	88	Dale Earnhardt Jr.	Hendrick Motorsports	Chevrolet	166	Running
5	8	31	Jeff Burton	Richard Childress Racing	Chevrolet	166	Running
6	12	99	Carl Edwards	Roush Fenway Racing	Ford	166	Running
7	6	2	Kurt Busch	Penske Racing	Dodge	166	Running
8	24	83	Reed Sorenson	Red Bull Racing	Toyota	166	Running
9	35	71	Mike Bliss	TRG Motorsports	Chevrolet	166	Running
10	27	82	Scott Speed	Red Bull Racing	Toyota	166	Running
11	19	00	David Reutimann	Michael Waltrip Racing	Toyota	166	Running
12	32	7	Robby Gordon	Robby Gordon Motorsports	Toyota	166	Running
13	39	36	Steve Park	Tommy Baldwin Racing	Chevrolet	166	Running
14	33	34	Kevin Conway	Front Row Motorsports	Ford	166	Running
15	7	17	Matt Kenseth	Roush Fenway Racing	Ford	166	Running
16	37	09	Bobby Labonte	Phoenix Racing	Chevrolet	166	Running
17	15	33	Clint Bowyer	Richard Childress Racing	Chevrolet	166	Running
18	23	98	Paul Menard	Richard Petty Motorsports	Ford	165	Running
19	41	46	J. J. Yeley	Whitney Motorsports	Dodge	164	Running
20	10	16	Greg Biffle	Roush Fenway Racing	Ford	163	Running
21	30	77	Sam Hornish Jr.	Penske Racing	Dodge	159	Accident
22	29	19	Elliott Sadler	Richard Petty Motorsports	Ford	159	Accident
23	34	37	Robert Richardson Jr.	Front Row Motorsports	Ford	159	Running
24	4	11	Denny Hamlin	Joe Gibbs Racing	Toyota	158	Running
25	9	14	Tony Stewart	Stewart Haas Racing	Chevrolet	158	Running
26	14	39	Ryan Newman	Stewart Haas Racing	Chevrolet	148	Accident
27	22	42	Juan Pablo Montoya	Earnhardt Ganassi Racing	Chevrolet	148	Accident
28	11	5	Mark Martin	Hendrick Motorsports	Chevrolet	148	Accident
29	16	20	Joey Logano	Joe Gibbs Racing	Toyota	148	Accident
30	26	12	Brad Keselowski	Penske Racing	Dodge	147	Accident
31	2	48	Jimmie Johnson	Hendrick Motorsports	Chevrolet	147	Accident
32	28	47	Marcos Ambrose	JTG Daugherty Racing	Toyota	147	Accident
33	31	78	Regan Smith	Furniture Row Racing	Chevrolet	147	Accident
34	38	38	Travis Kvapil	Front Row Motorsports	Ford	145	Accident
35	18	56	Martin Truex Jr.	Michael Waltrip Racing	Toyotoa	141	Running
36	21	43	A. J. Allmendinger	Richard Petty Motorsports	Ford	136	Running
37	36	26	David Stremme	Latitude 43 Motorsports	Ford	135	Accident
38	25	6	David Ragan	Roush Fenway Racing	Ford	116	Accident
39	17	1	Jamie McMurray	Earnhardt Ganassi Racing	Chevrolet	116	Accident
40	3	18	Kyle Busch	Joe Gibbs Racing	Toyota	103	Accident
41	42	87	Joe Nemechek	NEMCO Motorsports	Toyota	38	Electrical
42	40	13	Max Papis	Germain Racing	Toyota	6	Vibration
43	43	66	Dave Blaney	Prism Motorsports	Toyota	4	Transmission

Previous race: 2010 Lenox Industrial Tools 301	Sprint Cup Series; 2010 season	Next race: 2010 LifeLock.com 400
