= 2016 Can-Am Duels =

NASCAR races at Daytona International Speedway

Race details
- Date: February 18, 2016
- Location: Daytona International Speedway; Daytona Beach, Florida
- Course: Permanent racing facility 2.5 mi (4 km)
- Distance: Race 1: 60 laps, 150 mi (240 km); Race 2: 60 laps, 150 mi (240 km)
- Avg Speed: Race 1 172.911 mph (278.273 km/h); Race 2 191.898 mph (308.830 km/h)
- Weather: Clear night skies with a temperature of 59 °F (15 °C); wind out of the north/northeast at 14 mph (23 km/h)

Race 1
- Pole position: Chase Elliott (R)
- Most laps led: Dale Earnhardt Jr. (43)
- Winner: Dale Earnhardt Jr.

Race 2
- Pole position: Matt Kenseth
- Most laps led: Kyle Busch (35)
- Winner: Kyle Busch

Television
- Network: FS1 & MRN
- Announcers: Mike Joy, Jeff Gordon and Darrell Waltrip (Television); Joe Moore, Jeff Striegle and Rusty Wallace (Booth); Dave Moody (1 & 2), Mike Bagley (Backstretch) and Kyle Rickey (3 & 4) (Turns) (Radio)

The 2016 Can-Am Duels were a pair of NASCAR Sprint Cup Series stock car races held on February 18, 2016, at Daytona International Speedway in Daytona Beach, Florida. Both contested over 60 laps, they were the qualifying races for the 2016 Daytona 500. Dale Earnhardt Jr. won the first Duel race and Kyle Busch won the second Duel race.

== Report ==
=== Background ===
Daytona International Speedway, where the races were held.

Daytona International Speedway is a four-turn superspeedway that is 2.5 miles (4.0 km) long. The track's turns are banked at 31 degrees, while the front stretch, the location of the finish line, is banked at 18 degrees.

== Practice ==
=== First practice (February 13) ===
Dale Earnhardt Jr. was the fastest in the first practice session with a time of 46.364 and a speed of 194.116 mph (312.399 km/h).

Pos	No.	Driver	Team	Manufacturer	Time	Speed
1	88	Dale Earnhardt Jr.	Hendrick Motorsports	Chevrolet	46.364	194.116
2	22	Joey Logano	Team Penske	Ford	46.427	193.853
3	20	Matt Kenseth	Joe Gibbs Racing	Toyota	46.444	193.782
Official first practice results

=== Second practice (February 13) ===
Joey Logano was the fastest in the second practice session with a time of 45.934 and a speed of 195.933 mph (315.324 km/h).

Pos	No.	Driver	Team	Manufacturer	Time	Speed
1	22	Joey Logano	Team Penske	Ford	45.934	195.933
2	2	Brad Keselowski	Team Penske	Ford	45.954	195.848
3	21	Ryan Blaney (R)	Wood Brothers Racing	Ford	45.966	195.797
Official second practice results

== Pole qualifying ==
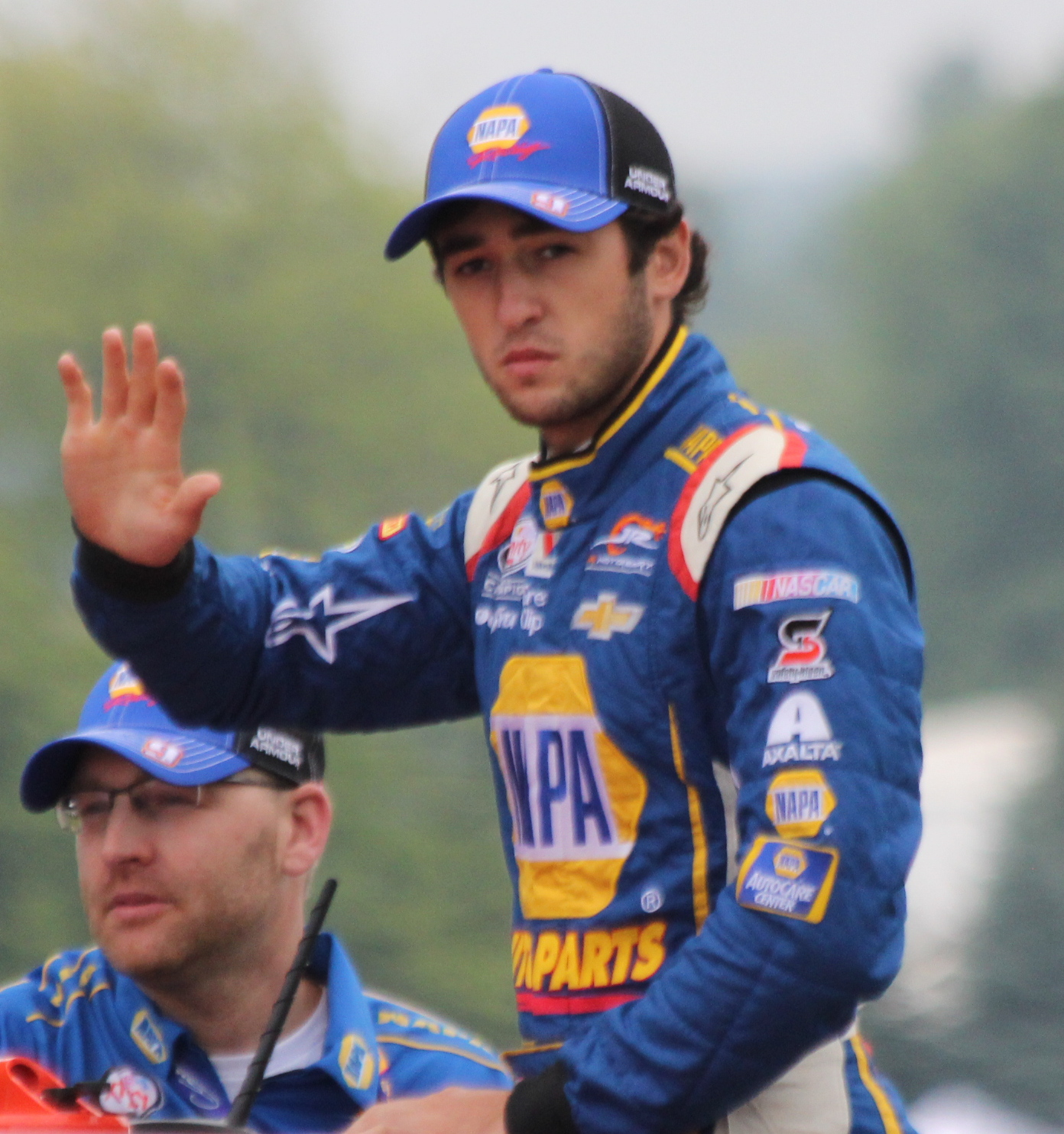
Chase Elliott, seen here at Road America, scored the pole for the Daytona 500.

Qualifying for the Daytona 500 is different from any other race weekend because the starting lineup for the race – except for the two drivers that post the two fastest timed laps in the final round of qualifying – isn't set on qualifying day. It sets the lineup for the two duel races the following Thursday.

Unlike qualifying at non-restrictor plate races, qualifying at Daytona International Speedway and Talladega Superspeedway consists of two rounds of cars being sent out one at a time to make a single timed lap. The fastest 12 advance to the final round to run for the pole position.

Chase Elliott scored the pole for the race with a time of 45.845 and a speed of 196.314 mph (315.937 km/h). He said that today was "a very, very cool day. I don’t know that this opportunity has sunk in yet, much less sitting on the pole for the Daytona 500. I think the big thing is just the team and the Daytona 500 qualifying is about the team guys and the effort they put into these cars and it’s nothing special I did, it’s really what kind of work they did this off-season to make it happen."

After qualifying seventh and being all but guaranteed into the Daytona 500 based on speed, Ryan Blaney said that he "wasn't really too nervous going into today. I knew we had a really fast race car. We just had to do our job and we did it and we just had to lock ourselves in. I really wasn't feeling any different than I do any other day."

Likewise, Matt DiBenedetto – who is also all but guaranteed in on his speed after qualifying 24th – said that he could "sleep well, finally. I was really nervous all night. This is just a testament to the hard work from the guys on my team. Two-hundredths of a second. I'm really thankful, thankful to be racing in my first Daytona 500, most importantly. I'm really thankful and blessed to be here.”

Martin Truex Jr. was unable to post a time over a roof flap issue. The Stewart Haas Racing cars of Kevin Harvick and Brian Vickers had their times disqualified after their track bars failed inspection.

=== Qualifying results ===
Pos	No.	Driver	Team	Manufacturer	R1	R2	Grid
1	24	Chase Elliott (R)	Hendrick Motorsports	Chevrolet	46.031	45.845	1 (1)
2	20	Matt Kenseth	Joe Gibbs Racing	Toyota	45.994	45.910	1 (2)
3	88	Dale Earnhardt Jr.	Hendrick Motorsports	Chevrolet	45.968	45.993	2 (1)
4	18	Kyle Busch	Joe Gibbs Racing	Toyota	46.127	46.105	2 (2)
5	17	Ricky Stenhouse Jr.	Roush Fenway Racing	Ford	46.191	46.126	3 (1)
6	48	Jimmie Johnson	Hendrick Motorsports	Chevrolet	46.215	46.192	3 (2)
7	21	Ryan Blaney (R)	Wood Brothers Racing	Ford	46.257	46.214	4 (1)
8	3	Austin Dillon	Richard Childress Racing	Chevrolet	46.201	46.231	4 (2)
9	19	Carl Edwards	Joe Gibbs Racing	Toyota	46.269	46.234	5 (1)
10	11	Denny Hamlin	Joe Gibbs Racing	Toyota	46.266	46.267	5 (2)
11	41	Kurt Busch	Stewart–Haas Racing	Chevrolet	46.330	46.270	6 (1)
12	22	Joey Logano	Team Penske	Ford	46.331	46.282	6 (2)
13	13	Casey Mears	Germain Racing	Chevrolet	46.332	—	7 (1)
14	5	Kasey Kahne	Hendrick Motorsports	Chevrolet	46.367	—	7 (2)
15	31	Ryan Newman	Richard Childress Racing	Chevrolet	46.368	—	8 (1)
16	27	Paul Menard	Richard Childress Racing	Chevrolet	46.407	—	8 (2)
17	95	Ty Dillon	Circle Sport – Leavine Family Racing	Chevrolet	46.407	—	9 (1)
18	2	Brad Keselowski	Team Penske	Ford	46.421	—	9 (2)
19	43	Aric Almirola	Richard Petty Motorsports	Ford	46.451	—	10 (1)
20	16	Greg Biffle	Roush Fenway Racing	Ford	46.472	—	10 (2)
21	1	Jamie McMurray	Chip Ganassi Racing	Chevrolet	46.536	—	11 (1)
22	44	Brian Scott (R)	Richard Petty Motorsports	Ford	46.552	—	11 (2)
23	42	Kyle Larson	Chip Ganassi Racing	Chevrolet	46.647	—	12 (1)
24	93	Matt DiBenedetto	BK Racing	Toyota	46.708	—	12 (2)
25	59	Michael McDowell	Circle Sport – Leavine Family Racing	Chevrolet	46.728	—	13 (1)
26	7	Regan Smith	Tommy Baldwin Racing	Chevrolet	46.743	—	13 (2)
27	83	Michael Waltrip	BK Racing	Toyota	46.776	—	14 (1)
28	34	Chris Buescher (R)	Front Row Motorsports	Ford	46.786	—	14 (2)
29	10	Danica Patrick	Stewart–Haas Racing	Chevrolet	46.804	—	15 (1)
30	32	Bobby Labonte	Go FAS Racing	Ford	46.922	—	15 (2)
31	47	A. J. Allmendinger	JTG Daugherty Racing	Chevrolet	46.977	—	16 (1)
32	6	Trevor Bayne	Roush Fenway Racing	Ford	47.013	—	16 (2)
33	46	Michael Annett	HScott Motorsports	Chevrolet	47.046	—	17 (1)
34	15	Clint Bowyer	HScott Motorsports	Chevrolet	47.059	—	17 (2)
35	38	Landon Cassill	Front Row Motorsports	Ford	47.073	—	18 (1)
36	26	Robert Richardson Jr.	BK Racing	Toyota	47.245	—	18 (2)
37	98	Cole Whitt	Premium Motorsports	Toyota	47.275	—	19 (1)
38	35	David Gilliland	Front Row Motorsports	Ford	47.531	—	19 (2)
39	23	David Ragan	BK Racing	Toyota	47.602	—	20 (1)
40	30	Josh Wise	The Motorsports Group	Chevrolet	48.056	—	20 (2)
41	40	Reed Sorenson	Premium Motorsports	Chevrolet	49.679	—	21 (1)
42	14	Brian Vickers	Stewart–Haas Racing	Chevrolet	0.000	-	21 (2)
43	4	Kevin Harvick	Stewart–Haas Racing	Chevrolet	0.000	-	22 (1)
44	78	Martin Truex Jr.	Furniture Row Racing	Toyota	0.000	-	22 (2)
Official qualifying results

Key	Meaning
(1)	Race 1
(2)	Race 2

== Practice (post-qualifying) ==
=== Third practice (February 17) ===
Michael McDowell was the fastest in the third practice session with a time of 44.961 and a speed of 200.173 mph (322.147 km/h).

Pos	No.	Driver	Team	Manufacturer	Time	Speed
1	59	Michael McDowell	Circle Sport – Leavine Family Racing	Chevrolet	44.961	200.173
2	6	Trevor Bayne	Roush Fenway Racing	Ford	45.019	199.916
3	16	Greg Biffle	Roush Fenway Racing	Ford	45.086	199.619
Official third practice results

=== Fourth practice (February 17) ===
Brian Scott was the fastest in the fourth practice session with a time of 45.045 and a speed of 199.800 mph (321.547 km/h). Kyle Larson and Michael Waltrip will start from the rear of the field in their respective Duel races after being involved in a four-car crash in turn 1.

Pos	No.	Driver	Team	Manufacturer	Time	Speed
1	44	Brian Scott (R)	Richard Petty Motorsports	Ford	45.045	199.800
2	3	Austin Dillon	Richard Childress Racing	Chevrolet	45.052	199.762
3	18	Kyle Busch	Joe Gibbs Racing	Toyota	45.061	199.729
Official fourth practice results

=== Final practice (February 18) ===
Jimmie Johnson was the fastest in the final practice session with a time of 46.619 and a speed of 193.054 mph (310.690 km/h).

Pos	No.	Driver	Team	Manufacturer	Time	Speed
1	48	Jimmie Johnson	Hendrick Motorsports	Chevrolet	46.619	193.054
2	44	Brian Scott (R)	Richard Petty Motorsports	Ford	47.394	189.897
3	43	Aric Almirola	Richard Petty Motorsports	Ford	47.394	189.897
Official final practice results

== Races ==
=== Race 1 ===
==== First half ====
===== Start =====
Under clear night Florida skies, Chase Elliott led the field to the green flag at 7:21 p.m. He drafted ahead of teammate Dale Earnhardt Jr. to lead the first lap. After stalling out heading to the line, Earnhardt took the lead on lap 3. He spent the next few laps holding the reins of the field controlling the top and bottom lanes. Eventually the field formed a single-file line and rode around the top lane of the track. Brad Keselowski made a few attempts to pass him, but Earnhardt continued to control the track to the point he settled back behind. By lap 27, the single-file train broke up and two lines formed amongst the front pack. A number of cars hit pit road to kick off a cycle of green flag stops on lap 40. Earnhardt hit pit road on lap 41 and teammate Kasey Kahne assumed the lead. He pitted the next lap and the lead cycled to Denny Hamlin.

==== Second half ====
The first caution of the race flew on lap 43 for a single-car spin in turn 1. Going for the pass on Michael McDowell, Cole Whitt got turned and sent spinning by Regan Smith. He retired from the race and would go on to miss the Daytona 500.

The race restarted with 13 laps to go. Hamlin got a jump on Earnhardt and pulled to the front with ease. Earnhardt worked his way back to the front and drove underneath Hamlin to retake the lead with five laps to go. As Brian Scott got turned and slammed the inside wall exiting turn 4, Earnhardt took the checkered flag. McDowell raced his way in as the fastest of the non-charter cars while Cole Whitt and Josh Wise did not qualify.

==== Results ====
Pos	Grid	No.	Driver	Team	Manufacturer	Laps
1	2	88	Dale Earnhardt Jr.	Hendrick Motorsports	Chevrolet	60
2	7	22	Joey Logano	Team Penske	Ford	60
3	4	21	Ryan Blaney	Wood Brothers Racing	Ford	60
4	22	4	Kevin Harvick	Stewart Haas Racing	Chevrolet	60
5	6	11	Denny Hamlin	Joe Gibbs Racing	Toyota	60
6	1	24	Chase Elliott (R)	Hendrick Motorsports	Chevrolet	60
7	8	5	Kasey Kahne	Hendrick Motorsports	Chevrolet	60
8	11	16	Greg Biffle	Roush Fenway Racing	Ford	60
9	15	34	Chris Buescher (R)	Front Row Motorsports	Ford	60
10	3	17	Ricky Stenhouse Jr.	Roush Fenway Racing	Ford	60
11	5	3	Austin Dillon	Richard Childress Racing	Chevrolet	60
12	17	6	Trevor Bayne	Roush Fenway Racing	Ford	60
13	10	2	Brad Keselowski	Team Penske	Ford	60
14	13	59	Michael McDowell	Circle Sport – Leavine Family Racing	Chevrolet	60
15	14	7	Regan Smith	Tommy Baldwin Racing	Chevrolet	60
16	20	23	David Ragan	BK Racing	Toyota	60
17	21	30	Josh Wise	The Motorsports Group	Chevrolet	60
18	18	15	Clint Bowyer	HScott Motorsports	Chevrolet	60
19	16	32	Bobby Labonte	Go FAS Racing	Ford	60
20	12	44	Brian Scott (R)	Richard Petty Motorsports	Ford	59
21	9	27	Paul Menard	Richard Childress Racing	Chevrolet	58
22	19	98	Cole Whitt	Premium Motorsports	Toyota	47
Unofficial race results

=== Race 2 ===
==== First half ====
===== Start =====
Matt Kenseth led the field to the green flag at 9:02 p.m. He pulled ahead of teammate Kyle Busch to lead the first lap. Unlike the first Duel race, the bottom line disappeared and the field formed a single-file train by the fifth lap. After Ryan Newman led the second pack of cars back up to the lead 11 cars, Martin Truex Jr. jumped in front of him and reformed the bottom line. However, the line lost momentum and merged with the top line. Running with debris on his grille, Kenseth let Busch go by him in turn 1 to get it off and Busch took over the lead on lap 25. Kyle Busch hit pit road on lap 39 and handed the lead to Aric Almirola. He pitted the next lap and the lead cycled back to Busch.

==== Second half ====
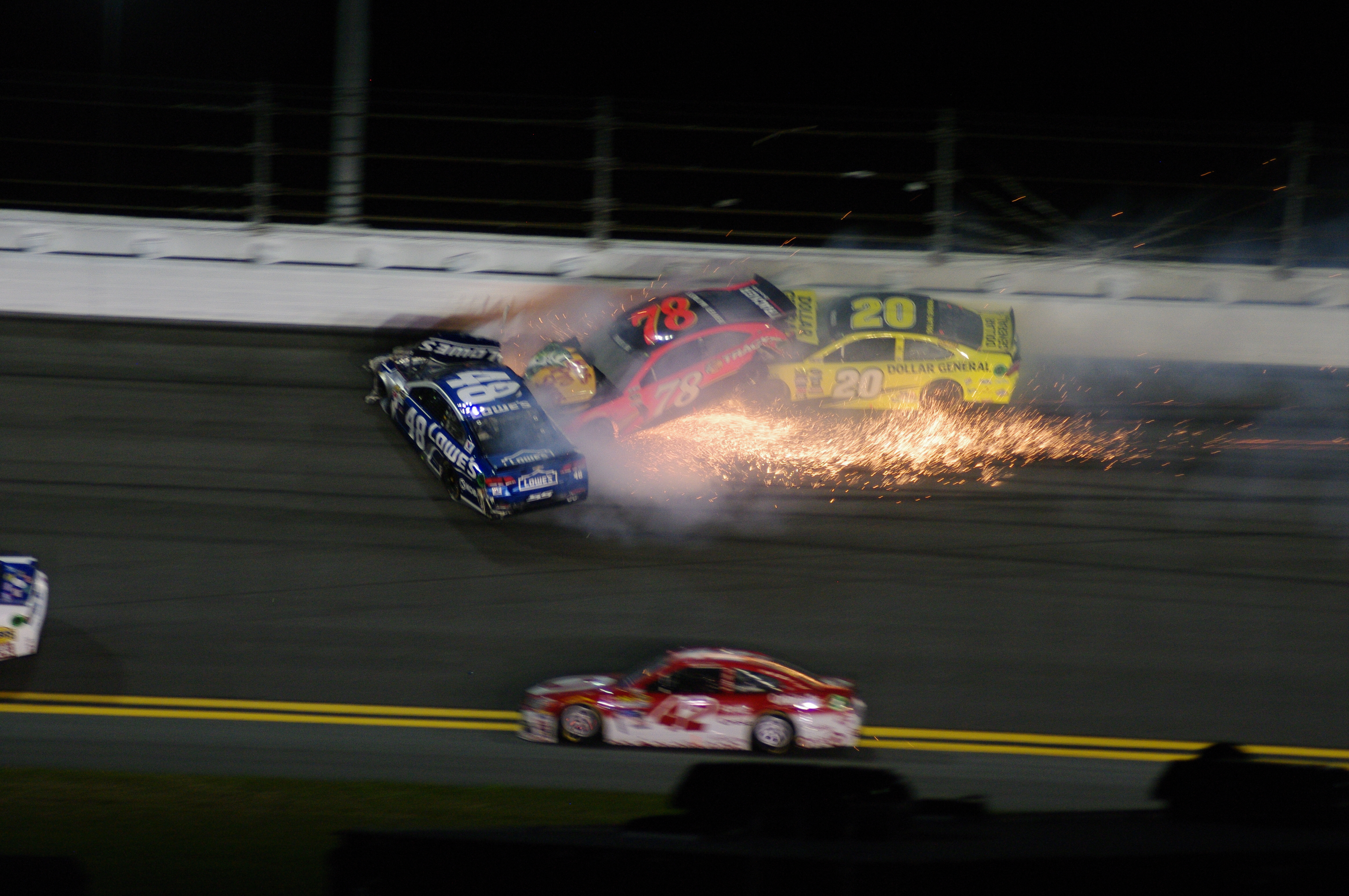
Jimmie Johnson, Matt Kenseth and Martin Truex Jr. on the final lap in turn 2

With six laps to go, Jimmie Johnson broke out of line and caused the single-file line to form multiple lines before reforming into a single line. Eventually, Kenseth tried to break the line up again, but the field remained in place. With two laps to go, Casey Mears ran out of gas, nearly caused a wreck amongst the leaders and broke up the single-file train. The final lap saw a multi-car wreck in turn 1 that ended the race and gave the win to Busch. Robert Richardson Jr. raced his way in, while David Gilliland and Reed Sorenson failed to qualify.

==== Results ====
Pos	Grid	No.	Driver	Team	Manufacturer	Laps
1	2	18	Kyle Busch	Joe Gibbs Racing	Toyota	60
2	10	1	Jamie McMurray	Chip Ganassi Racing	Chevrolet	60
3	5	41	Kurt Busch	Stewart–Haas Racing	Chevrolet	60
4	4	19	Carl Edwards	Joe Gibbs Racing	Toyota	60
5	8	95	Ty Dillon	Circle Sport – Leavine Family Racing	Chevrolet	60
6	11	42	Kyle Larson	Chip Ganassi Racing	Chevrolet	60
7	14	10	Danica Patrick	Stewart–Haas Racing	Chevrolet	60
8	22	14	Brian Vickers	Stewart–Haas Racing	Chevrolet	60
9	12	93	Matt DiBenedetto	BK Racing	Toyota	60
10	16	46	Michael Annett	HScott Motorsports	Chevrolet	60
11	17	38	Landon Cassill	Front Row Motorsports	Ford	60
12	19	35	David Gilliland	Front Row Motorsports	Ford	60
13	3	48	Jimmie Johnson	Hendrick Motorsports	Chevrolet	59
14	21	78	Martin Truex Jr.	Furniture Row Racing	Toyota	59
15	15	47	A. J. Allmendinger	JTG Daugherty Racing	Chevrolet	59
16	1	20	Matt Kenseth	Joe Gibbs Racing	Toyota	59
17	6	13	Casey Mears	Germain Racing	Chevrolet	59
18	18	26	Robert Richardson Jr.	BK Racing	Toyota	59
19	9	43	Aric Almirola	Richard Petty Motorsports	Ford	59
20	13	83	Michael Waltrip	BK Racing	Toyota	59
21	20	40	Reed Sorenson	Premium Motorsports	Chevrolet	56
22	7	31	Ryan Newman	Richard Childress Racing	Chevrolet	31
Unofficial race results

== Media ==
=== Television ===
FS1
Booth announcers	Pit reporters
Lap-by-lap: Mike Joy; Color-commentator: Jeff Gordon; Color commentator: Darrell Waltrip	Jamie Little; Chris Neville; Vince Welch; Matt Yocum

=== Radio ===
MRN Radio
Booth announcers	Turn announcers	Pit reporters
Lead announcer: Joe Moore; Announcer: Jeff Striegle; Announcer: Rusty Wallace	Turns 1 & 2: Dave Moody; Backstretch: Mike Bagley; Turns 3 & 4: Kyle Rickey	Alex Hayden; Winston Kelley; Steve Post
