= 2009 AMP Energy 500 =

Race details
- Race 33 of 36 in the 2009 NASCAR Sprint Cup Series
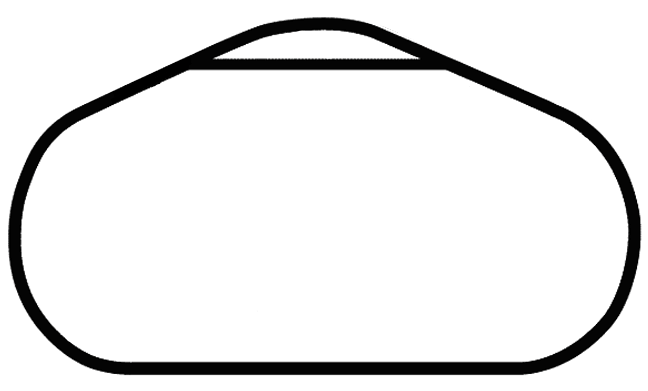
- Talladega Superspeedway
- Date: November 1, 2009
- Location: Talladega Superspeedway, Talladega, Alabama
- Course: Permanent racing facility
- Course length: 2.66 miles (4.28 km)
- Distance: 191 laps, 508.06 mi (817.643 km)
- Scheduled distance: 188 laps, 500.08 mi (804.80 km)
- Weather: Temperatures reaching up to 62.6 °F (17.0 °C); wind speeds up to 11.1 miles per hour (17.9 km/h)
- Average speed: 157.213 miles per hour (253.010 km/h)

Pole position
| Driver | Jimmie Johnson | Hendrick Motorsports |
- Time: No time trials

Most laps led
| Driver | Jamie McMurray | Roush Fenway Racing |
- Laps: 32

Winner
| No. 26 | Jamie McMurray | Roush Fenway Racing |

Television in the United States
- Network: ABC
- Announcers: Jerry Punch, Dale Jarrett, and Andy Petree

The 2009 AMP Energy 500 was the 33rd race of the 2009 NASCAR Sprint Cup season and the seventh event of the Chase for the Sprint Cup.

== Summary ==
It was held on November 1, 2009, at Talladega Superspeedway in Talladega, Alabama, and is the only race in the Championship Chase to utilize restrictor plates. This marks the first time the race was run in an early November spot, the slot formerly occupied by the Atlanta Motor Speedway event. Jamie McMurray won the race, his first since Daytona in 2007. The last 15 laps of the race were a duel between McMurray and David Stremme, who had never had a top-five in Sprint Cup competition. Stremme ended up 22nd after running out of fuel. Nationwide Series regular Robert Richardson Jr. made his first Cup start and finished 18th.

=== Qualifying ===
Because qualifying was rained out, the rules awarded points leader Jimmie Johnson the pole position.

=== Single-file racing ===
NASCAR told the drivers in the drivers meeting that they could not bump draft in the corners. That was followed by a controversial race where drivers drove in a single file line all the way around the track for a few segments. Many fans believed and still believe that that was a protest by the drivers to the new rule. Jimmie Johnson and Jamie McMurray all defended their actions. Johnson responded by saying, "No, there's not truth to that. When we hit single-file like that, we just know there's no need to race at that point. All that matters is from that last pit stop on." Instead of deciding to wreck and dwindle down the field on Sunday, Johnson said the drivers finally got smart about how to approach the race. Everyone seemed to realize that you can't win if you aren't around at the end.

McMurray, the eventual race winner, said, "It wasn't like everybody was in their cars and we were like, 'Let's get single-file and prove a point' or 'Let's just follow each other.' You had to be in the outside groove because that's where all the momentum was." This continued with Casey Mears leading the line for many laps until the first round of green flag pit stops started.

=== Race ends under caution ===
With five laps to go, Ryan Newman's car flipped on the back straightaway, landing on Kevin Harvick, and also collecting Marcos Ambrose and Elliott Sadler. The race was briefly red-flagged as debris was cleaned up and paramedics cut Newman from his car. Newman was uninjured. After a green-white-checkered restart, a big wreck happened with two laps to go, causing Kurt Busch, Scott Speed, Mark Martin, Jeff Gordon and Robby Gordon to crash; Martin's car blew over, but landed back on its wheels. The race ended under the caution flag and McMurray was scored as winner.

=== Top 20 finishers ===
1. Jamie McMurray
2. Kasey Kahne
3. Joey Logano
4. Greg Biffle
5. Jeff Burton
6. Jimmie Johnson
7. Michael Waltrip
8. Brad Keselowski
9. Elliott Sadler
10. Bobby Labonte
11. Dale Earnhardt Jr.
12. Clint Bowyer
13. Brian Vickers
14. Carl Edwards
15. Kyle Busch
16. Reed Sorenson
17. David Ragan
18. Robert Richardson Jr.
19. Juan Pablo Montoya
20. Jeff Gordon

| Previous race: 2009 TUMS Fast Relief 500 | Sprint Cup Series; 2009 season | Next race: 2009 Dickies 500 |
