= 2009 Dickies 500 =

34th race of 2009 NASCAR Sprint Cup season

Race details
- Race 34 of 36 in the 2009 NASCAR Sprint Cup Series
- The 2009 Dickies 500 program cover, with artwork by Sam Bass. "Ghost Riders!"
- Date: November 8, 2009
- Location: Texas Motor Speedway, Fort Worth, Texas
- Course: Permanent racing facility
- Course length: 1.5 miles (2.4 km)
- Distance: 334 laps, 501 mi (806.281 km)
- Weather: Temperatures up to 71.6 °F (22.0 °C); wind speeds up to 8.90 miles per hour (14.32 km/h)
- Average speed: 147.137 miles per hour (236.794 km/h)

Pole position
Driver	Jeff Gordon	Hendrick Motorsports
- Time: 28.255

Most laps led
Driver	Kyle Busch	Joe Gibbs Racing
- Laps: 232

Winner
No. 2	Kurt Busch	Penske Racing

Television in the United States
- Network: ABC
- Announcers: Jerry Punch, Dale Jarrett, Andy Petree
- Nielsen ratings: 3.7/7 (Final); 3.2/6 (Overnight); (5.827 million)

The 2009 Dickies 500 was the 34th stock car race of the 2009 NASCAR Sprint Cup Series and the eighth in the ten-race season-ending Chase for the Sprint Cup. It was held on November 8, 2009, at Texas Motor Speedway, in Fort Worth, Texas, before a crowd of 167,000. Kurt Busch of the Penske Racing team won the 334-lap race starting from third position. Denny Hamlin of Joe Gibbs Racing finished second and Roush Fenway Racing's Matt Kenseth was third.

Going into the event, Jimmie Johnson was leading his Hendrick Motorsports teammate Mark Martin in the Drivers' Championship by 184 points. Jeff Gordon won the pole position with the quickest recorded lap time in the qualifying session, although he was almost immediately passed by Kasey Kahne at the start of the race. Many Chase for the Sprint Cup participants, including Johnson and Carl Edwards encountered problems during the race. Kyle Busch was leading the race with three laps remaining but ran out of fuel, giving the lead, and the victory, to Kurt Busch. There were a total of eight cautions during the race and thirteen lead changes among four different drivers during the course of the race.

The race saw Kurt Busch achieve his second win of the 2009 season, his first at Texas Motor Speedway, and the 20th of his career. The result advanced Busch from sixth to fourth in the Drivers' Championship, 171 points behind the leader Johnson and seven ahead of third-placed Tony Stewart. Chevrolet maintained its lead in the Manufacturers' Championship, fifty-five ahead of Toyota, eighty-nine ahead of Ford, and ninety-six in front of Dodge. The race attracted 5.82 million television viewers.

== Background ==
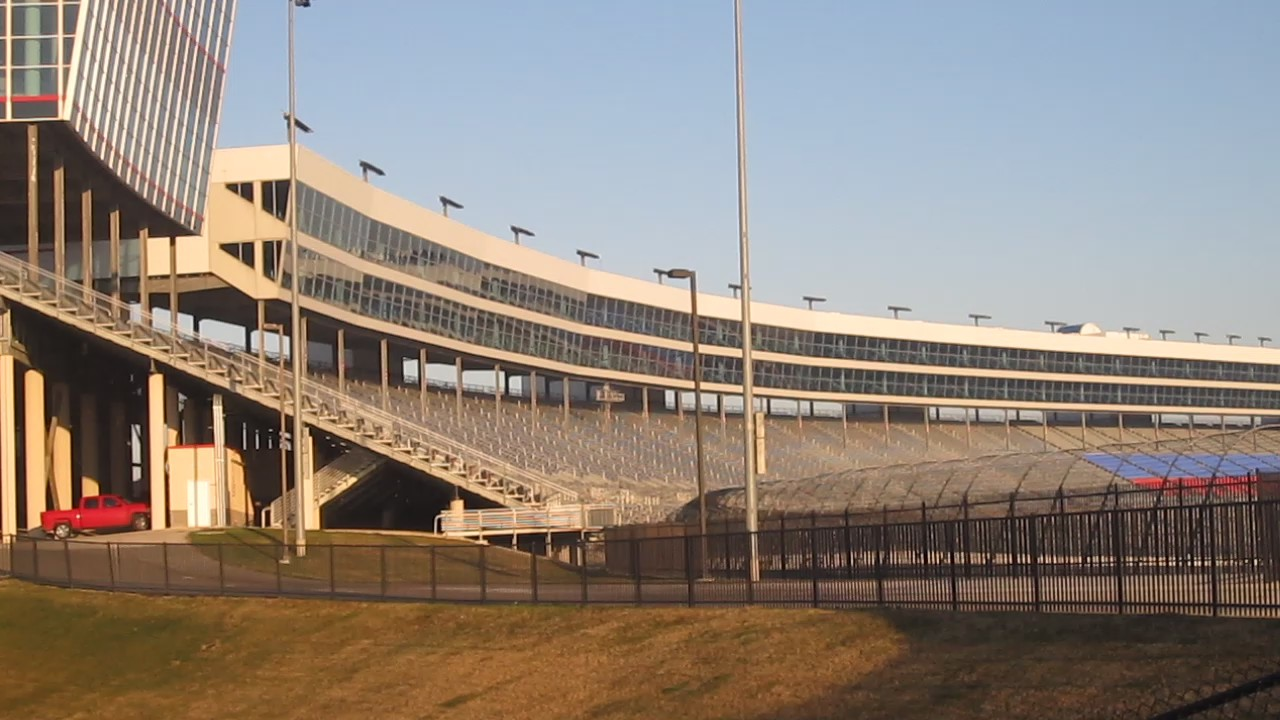
Texas Motor Speedway, where the race was held.

The layout of Texas Motor Speedway, the venue where the race was held.

The Dickies 500 was the 34th of 36 scheduled stock car races of the 2009 NASCAR Sprint Cup Series and the eighth in the ten-race season-ending Chase for the Sprint Cup. It was held on November 8, 2009, in Fort Worth, Texas at Texas Motor Speedway, an intermediate track that hold NASCAR races. The standard track at Texas Motor Speedway is a four-turn quad-oval track that is 1.5 miles (2.4 km) long. The track's turns are banked at twenty-four degrees, and both the front stretch (the location of the finish line) and the back stretch have a five degree banking.

One team chose to replace their regular driver with a substitute. Penske Championship Racing driver David Stremme (who was unable to secure a top-ten finish) was replaced by the 2009 Aaron's 499 winner Brad Keselowski for the final three races of the 2009 season, to allow Keselowski to gain experience before driving full-time with the team the following season. Richard Petty Motorsports switched from fielding a Dodge to a Ford for driver A. J. Allmendinger in its No. 44 entry starting from the Dickies 500 as preparation for the team fielding three Ford Fusions for the following season.

Before the race, Jimmie Johnson led the Drivers' Championship, with 6,248 points, with Mark Martin 184 points behind in second and Jeff Gordon a further eight points adrift in third. Juan Pablo Montoya and Tony Stewart were fourth and fifth, and Kurt Busch, Greg Biffle, Ryan Newman, Kasey Kahne, Carl Edwards, Denny Hamlin and Brian Vickers rounded out the top twelve drivers competing for the 2009 Chase for the Sprint Cup. In the Manufacturers' Championship, Chevrolet were leading with 244 points, sixty-two points ahead of their rivals Toyota. Ford with 145 points, were nine points ahead of Dodge in the battle for third. Edwards was the race's defending champion.

With three rounds of the season remaining, Johnson said he felt he could win one or two more races and would not approach the final three events with a view to protecting his points lead, "We're showing up to win races. Finishing 10th isn't as easy as it sounds. It's a tough field of cars out there and we need to be on our game." His teammate Martin crashed in the preceding race at Talladega Superspeedway and was worn out over people talking to him about his standing in the points, adding, "I'm just ready to have a fresh outlook and get back to it just being about the race itself." Jeff Gordon had won the Samsung 500 at the circuit earlier in the season but acknowledged his team had to "take another step forward", saying, "If we showed up this weekend with the same setup we used in April, we'd run 15th. That's just the way the sport is. Everybody is constantly learning and the competition is constantly getting better and quicker."

== Practice and qualifying ==
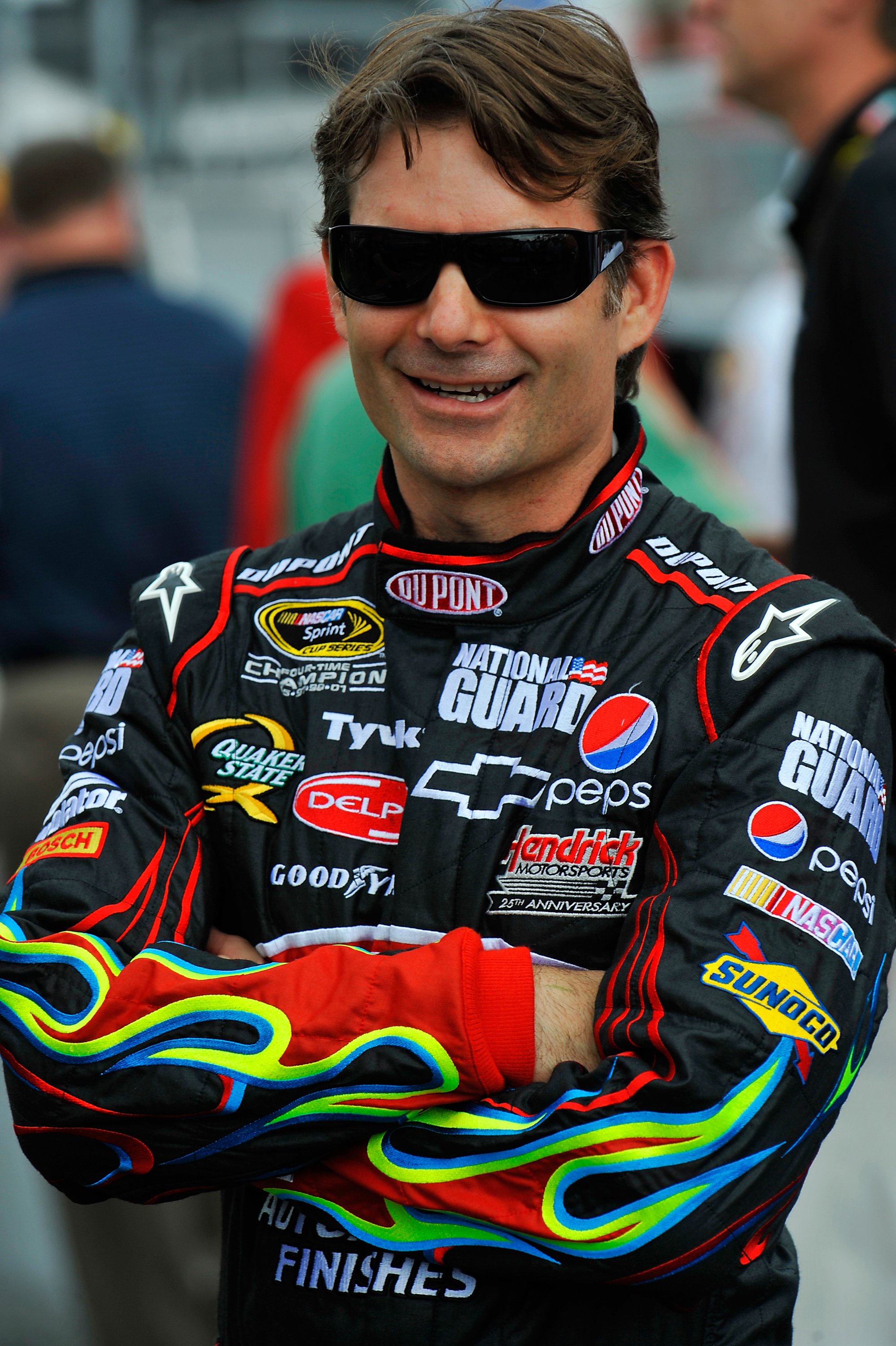
Jeff Gordon had the pole position of his season.

Three practice sessions were held before the Sunday race—one on Friday, and two on Saturday. The first session lasted 90 minutes, the second 45 minutes, and the third and final session 60 minutes. In the first practice session, Clint Bowyer was fastest with a lap of 28.514 seconds, placing ahead of Biffle in second, and Johnson in third. Gordon was fourth fastest, and Edwards placed fifth. Kurt Busch, David Ragan, Jeff Burton, Keselowski and Kevin Harvick rounded out the top ten fastest drivers in the session. Max Papis damaged the right-hand side of his car when he hit the turn two wall; Jamie McMurray, David Reutimann and Mike Bliss also hit the turn two wall. Bliss went to a back-up car because the right side of his car was heavily damaged. John Andretti's engine failed during the early phase of the session, and Andretti changed engines. Burton switched to a back-up car after he collided with the turn two outside wall.

A total of forty-seven drivers were entered in the qualifier on Friday afternoon; according to NASCAR's qualifying procedure, forty-three were allowed to race. Each driver ran two laps, with the starting order determined by the competitor's fastest times. Gordon clinched his first pole position of the season, and the 68th of his career, with a time of 28.255 seconds, which was a record in qualifying for the Car of Tomorrow specification at the circuit. This extended his streak of securing a pole position in the Cup Series to seventeen successive seasons. He was joined on the grid's front row by Kahne who held pole position until Jeff Gordon's lap. Kurt Busch qualified third, Stewart took fourth, and Kyle Busch started fifth. Edwards qualified sixth after sliding sideways leaving the final turn, while Martin set the seventh fastest time. Biffle qualified eighth, Dale Earnhardt Jr. ninth and Clint Bowyer tenth. The four drivers that failed to qualify were Tony Raines, Dave Blaney, Papis and Mike Bliss. Derrike Cope withdrew from the race prior to qualifying. After the qualifier Gordon said, "Our efforts here have improved because we've really focused on it, They started with qualifying, and luckily last time they showed up in the race. ... So we certainly hope we can take this qualifying effort and create those types of results as well."

On Saturday morning, David Reutimann was fastest in the second practice session by setting a lap time of 28.906 seconds, ahead of Stewart in second, and Montoya in third. Kyle Busch was fourth quickest, and Kurt Busch took fifth. Kahne managed sixth. Matt Kenseth, Hamlin, Martin and Johnson followed in the top ten. Of the other drivers in the Chase, Gordon set the eleventh fastest time, while Biffle was placed thirteenth. Later that day, Johnson paced the final practice session with a time of 28.928 seconds, with Edwards in second, and Hamlin in third. Biffle was fourth quickest, and Bill Elliott took fifth. Ragan managed sixth. Robby Gordon was seventh fastest, Earnhardt eighth, Reutimann ninth, and Martin Truex Jr. tenth. Other Chase drivers included Montoya in fourteenth and Newman in sixteenth. Harvick collided with the turn two wall; he sustained minor damage, allowing his team to repair his car.

=== Qualifying results ===
Grid	No.	Driver	Team	Manufacturer	Time	Speed
1	24	Jeff Gordon	Hendrick Motorsports	Chevrolet	28.255	191.117
2	9	Kasey Kahne	Richard Petty Motorsports	Dodge	28.276	190.975
3	2	Kurt Busch	Penske Championship Racing	Dodge	28.281	190.941
4	14	Tony Stewart	Stewart–Haas Racing	Chevrolet	28.328	190.624
5	18	Kyle Busch	Joe Gibbs Racing	Toyota	28.343	190.523
6	99	Carl Edwards	Roush Fenway Racing	Ford	28.399	190.148
7	5	Mark Martin	Hendrick Motorsports	Chevrolet	28.408	190.087
8	16	Greg Biffle	Roush Fenway Racing	Ford	28.413	190.054
9	88	Dale Earnhardt Jr.	Hendrick Motorsports	Chevrolet	28.427	189.960
10	33	Clint Bowyer	Richard Childress Racing	Chevrolet	28.428	189.954
11	77	Sam Hornish Jr.	Team Penske	Dodge	28.436	189.900
12	48	Jimmie Johnson	Hendrick Motorsports	Chevrolet	28.442	189.860
13	00	David Reutimann	Michael Waltrip Racing	Toyota	28.448	189.820
14	20	Joey Logano	Joe Gibbs Racing	Toyota	28.451	189.800
15	83	Brian Vickers	Red Bull Racing Team	Toyota	28.452	189.793
16	44	A. J. Allmendinger	Richard Petty Motorsports	Ford	28.466	189.700
17	6	David Ragan	Furniture Row Racing	Ford	28.466	189.700
18	43	Reed Sorenson	Richard Petty Motorsports	Dodge	28.482	189.593
19	47	Marcos Ambrose	JTG Daugherty Racing	Toyota	28.483	189.587
20	42	Juan Pablo Montoya	Earnhardt Ganassi Racing	Chevrolet	28.510	189.407
21	02	David Gilliland	Joe Gibbs Racing	Toyota	28.579	188.950
22	26	Jamie McMurray	Roush Fenway Racing	Ford	28.589	188.884
23	70	Mike Skinner	TRG Motorsports	Chevrolet	28.595	188.844
24	29	Kevin Harvick	Richard Childress Racing	Chevrolet	28.617	188.699
25	11	Denny Hamlin	Joe Gibbs Racing	Toyota	28.619	188.686
26	39	Ryan Newman	Stewart–Haas Racing	Chevrolet	28.625	188.646
27	1	Martin Truex Jr.	Earnhardt Ganassi Racing	Chevrolet	28.634	188.587
28	71	Bobby Labonte	TRG Motorsports	Chevrolet	28.670	188.350
29	7	Robby Gordon	Robby Gordon Motorsports	Toyota	28.675	188.317
30	17	Matt Kenseth	Roush Fenway Racing	Ford	28.677	188.304
31	82	Scott Speed	Red Bull Racing Team	Toyota	28.721	188.016
32	78	Regan Smith	Furniture Row Racing	Chevrolet	28.725	187.990
33	19	Elliott Sadler	Richard Petty Motorsports	Dodge	28.732	187.944
34	87	Joe Nemechek	NEMCO Motorsports	Toyota	28.751	187.820
35	12	Brad Keselowski	Penske Championship Racing	Dodge	28.754	187.800
36	07	Casey Mears	Richard Childress Racing	Chevrolet	28.755	187.793
37	36	Michael McDowell	Tommy Baldwin Racing	Toyota	28.804	187.474
38	96	Erik Darnell	Hall of Fame Racing	Ford	28.849	187.182
39	98	Paul Menard	Robert Yates Racing	Ford	28.903	186.832
40	55	Michael Waltrip	Michael Waltrip Racing	Toyota	28.964	186.438
41	34	John Andretti	Front Row Motorsports	Chevrolet	29.003	186.188^{1}
42	31	Jeff Burton	Richard Childress Racing	Chevrolet	29.385	183.767
43	21	Bill Elliott	Wood Brothers Racing	Ford	Champion's Provisional^{1}	
Failed to qualify
44	37	Tony Raines	Front Row Motorsports	Chevrolet	28.929	186.664
45	66	Dave Blaney	Prism Motorsports	Toyota	29.008	186.156
46	13	Max Papis	Germain Racing	Toyota	29.057	185.842
47	09	Mike Bliss	Phoenix Racing	Dodge	29.413	183.592
WD	08	Derrike Cope	John Carter Racing	Toyota		
^{1} Moved to the back of the field for changing engines (#41) and for changing transmissions (#21)

== Race ==
The race began at 3:15 p.m. Eastern Standard Time and was televised live in the United States on ABC. Commentary was provided by play-by-play announcer Jerry Punch, with analysis given by Dale Jarrett and Andy Petree. At the start of the race, weather conditions were cloudy. Approximately 167,000 spectators attended the race; Texas Motor Speedway president Eddie Gossage said that he had anticipated that between 175,000 and 185,000 people would go to the race. Dr. Roger Marsh began pre-race ceremonies by giving the invocation. The Texas Christian University Marching Band performed the national anthem, and rock band ZZ Top gave the command for drivers to start their engines. During the pace laps, two drivers moved to the back of the grid due to unapproved changes: Bill Elliott because of a transmission change, and Andretti because he changed his engine.

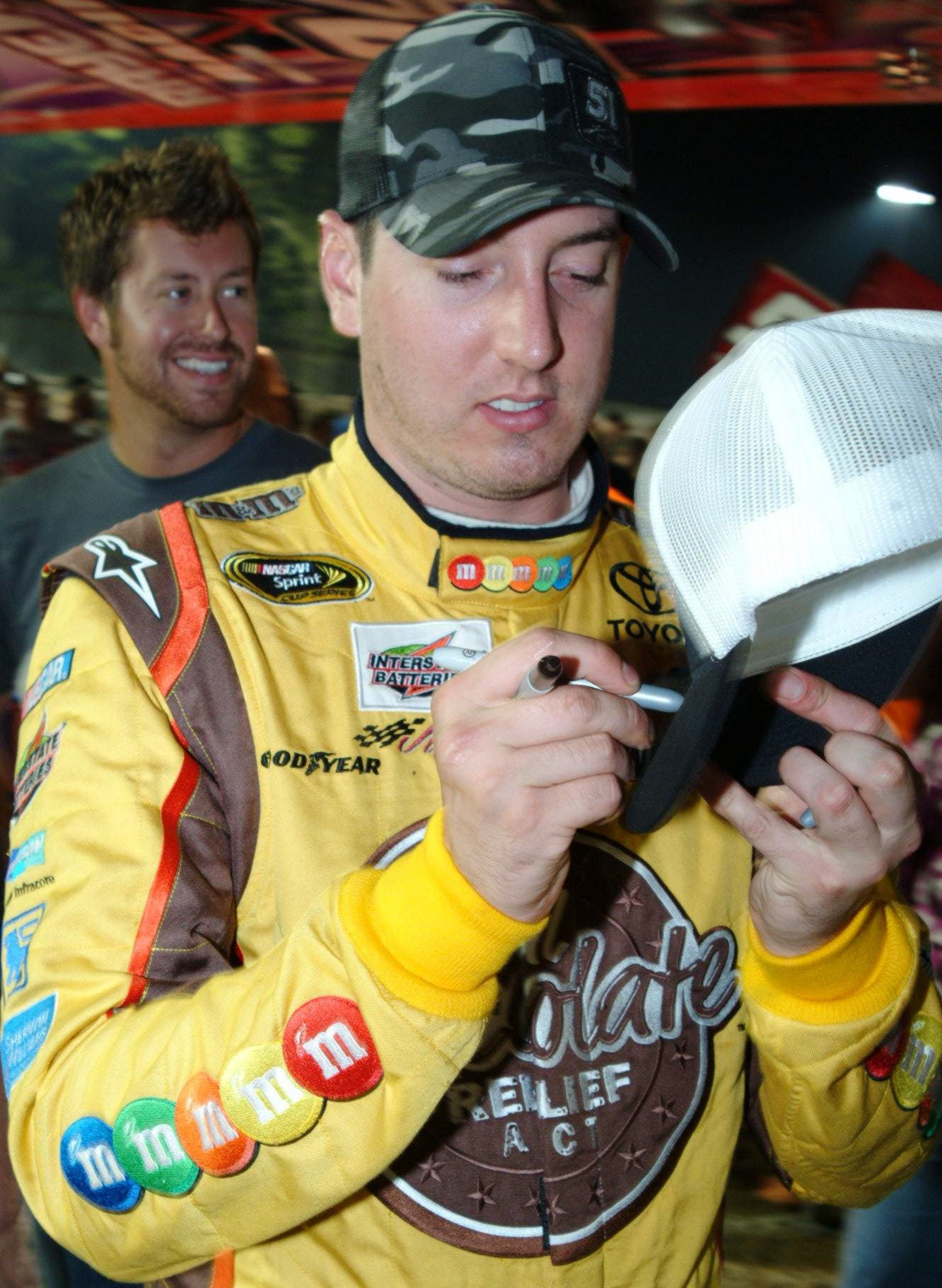
Kyle Busch led the most laps of the race (232).

Jeff Gordon retained his pole position lead into the first corner. Exiting the second turn on the third lap, Reutimann made contact with Hornish on the inside lane, who was sent up the track and into the left-hand side door on Johnson's car. Johnson collided with the outside wall with the right-rear of his car, and damaged multiple car components; secondary contact with Hornish sent him into the outside barrier. The first caution of the race was subsequently given. None of the leaders elected to make pit stops during the caution, and Johnson drove to his garage for multiple car components to be replaced. Jeff Gordon maintained his lead on the lap nine restart. Kurt Busch passed Jeff Gordon on the inside of the track for the lead position three laps later. After starting twenty-ninth, Robby Gordon had moved up thirteen positions to sixteenth by lap 34. One lap later, Johnson's car was fitted with a new driveshaft.

Earnhardt had moved into fourth by lap 38 and was closing the gap to Gordon in third. Six laps later, Kurt Busch was leading by more than three seconds from Kyle Busch. By the 48th lap, Reutimann, who started thirteenth, had moved into the third position. Green flag pit stops for tires, fuel and car adjustments began on lap 52, when Elliott Sadler became the first driver to pit. Stewart became the new leader after Kurt Busch came onto pit road. Stewart made his pit stop on lap 56, handing the lead to Michael Waltrip. After the leaders made their pit stops, Kyle Busch claimed the lead on lap 58. Six laps later, Kyle Busch had a 2.5 second lead over Kurt Busch. On lap 70, Jeff Gordon fell to eleventh due to a slow pit stop. Two laps later, Marcos Ambrose, who started thirty-fifth, had moved up twenty-nine positions to sixth.

By the 84th lap, Kyle Busch's lead was half a second from Kurt Busch. Two laps later, Hornish collided with the wall and suffered three flat tires, prompting the second caution. During the caution, most of the leaders made pit stops. Kyle Busch remained the leader after the pit stops and maintained it at the lap 92 restart. Montoya moved into ninth, as Stewart passed Reutimann for third on the same. Two laps later, Jeff Gordon had moved up into ninth. Sunlight came off the track surface by lap 99, causing track temperatures to cool and drivers were reminded by their crew chiefs to drive cautiously in the turns. Martin moved into the thirteenth position by lap 102. Ambrose had moved into third nine laps later. Although Johnson's crew chief Chad Knaus told the driver that his vehicle was damaged beyond repair due to the heavy damage it sustained, Johnson rejoined the race on lap 115 after repairs took 68 minutes to complete, albeit without his car's rear bumper. Kyle Busch had built up a one and a half second lead over Kurt Busch by lap 116. Johnson drove to pit road to resolve tire rubbing problems two laps later. Martin moved into the top ten positions by lap 122, as Gordon fell down to fourteenth four laps later. On lap 134, Johnson rejoined the track, but returned to pit road eight laps later as the green flag pit stop period began. Hamlin gained the lead on lap 146. After pit stops, Kyle Busch reclaimed the first position.

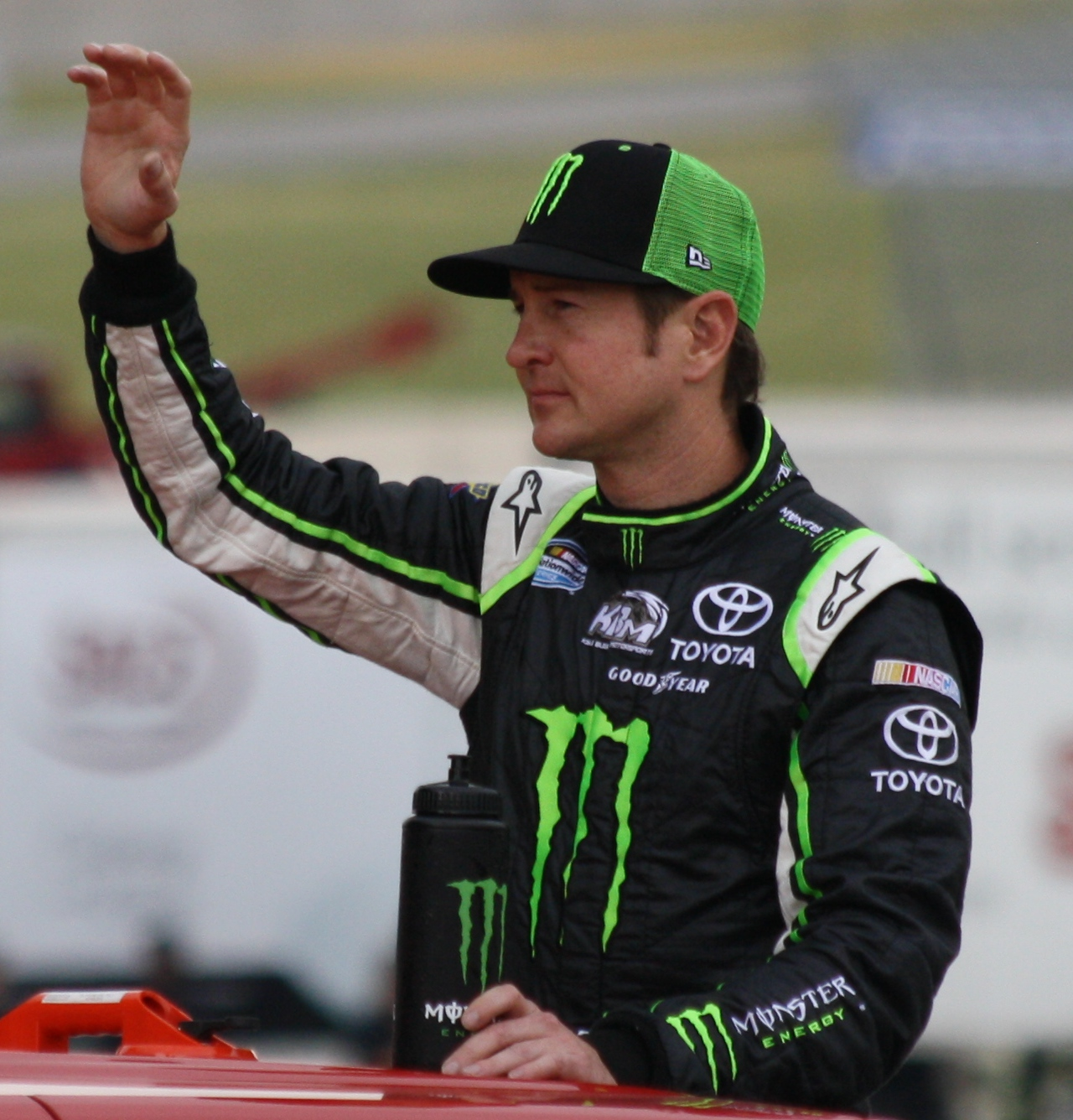
Kurt Busch won the race after Kyle Busch made a pit stop for fuel with three laps remaining.

Drivers reported track conditions were changing as cooler air came over the circuit by lap 148. Just as he was about to be lapped by the race leader, Jeff Gordon reported seeing debris at turn one on the 167th lap, which triggered the third caution. Some of the leaders chose to make pit stops during the caution as race officials cleaned the debris. Kyle Busch maintained his lead at the restart on lap 173, ahead of Kurt Busch and Earnhardt. The fourth caution was given on lap 175 when Montoya collided with the wall between the first and second turns, damaging his car. Edwards, who was hit by Montoya, had sustained a similar amount of damage to his car. Keselowski was caught up in the crash, and Jeff Gordon was forced to spin sideways but he avoided damaging his car. None of the leaders made pit stops during the caution. Officials cleared the surface at turn one and checked turn two for a brake motor. The race restarted on lap 182 with Kurt Busch leading, ahead of Kyle Busch, and Reutimann.

Kurt Busch had built up a 1.4 second lead four laps later. On lap 206, Reed Sorenson damaged his car, after colliding with the turn two walls due to a right-front tire failure, which caused the fifth and final caution. Most of the leaders made pit stops for fuel and car adjustments during the caution. Kyle Busch led on the restart on lap 213, followed by Kurt Busch and Reutimann. Kurt Busch was planned to stay on the track for two stints lasting 60 laps each by his crew chief Pat Tryson as other drivers required fuel stops after 58 lap stints. Five laps later, Kahne moved into ninth position. On lap 221, Earnhardt. dropped two positions to seventh. Eight laps later, Martin moved into the fifth position.

On lap 238, Martin passed Stewart to claim fourth. Kyle Busch maintained a 1.4 second lead over Kurt Busch by the 249th lap. Three laps later, Keselowski exited his garage to rejoin the race. By lap 262, drivers reported their cars were sliding in the corners as their tires became worn. Green flag pit stops began on lap 265; Kyle Busch maintained the lead at the end of the cycle, ahead of Reutimann and Kenseth. On the 290th lap, Kurt Busch's crew reported to him that he was running two laps short of fuel. Six laps later, Kyle Busch started to slow in the corners to conserve fuel. On the 298th lap, Martin dropped one position to run fifth. By the 302nd lap, overall speeds had dropped due to drivers starting to conserve fuel. Green flag pit stops began on lap 311, as Truex made a stop for fuel.

Kyle Busch was leading Reutimann by four seconds by the 314th lap. He and his crew chief Dave Rogers made the decision on the 320th lap not to make a pit stop for additional fuel and remained on the circuit. Two laps later, Kyle Busch was told by his team to slow. On lap 332, Kyle Busch drove to pit road, having run out of fuel in turn three, handing the lead to Kurt Busch. This prevented Kyle Busch from becoming the first driver to win all three events in NASCAR's three major touring series at the same track on the same weekend. One lap later, Ambrose ran out of fuel, as Kurt Busch held the lead to achieve his second victory of the 2009 season and the 20th of his career. Hamlin conserved enough fuel to finish second; he had collided with the barrier earlier in the race while attempting to recover positions from being delayed by slow stops on pit road. Kenseth placed third, ahead of Martin in fourth, and Harvick in fifth. Stewart, Bowyer, Biffle, Burton and Allmendinger rounded out the top ten finishers. There were thirteen lead changes among four different drivers during the race. Kyle Busch led six times for a total of 232 laps, more than any other racer. Kurt Busch led for six periods in the race, for a total of 89 laps.

=== Post-race ===
"This is the first time Kyle and I raced each other hard. It's bittersweet. I was rooting for him, but at the same time, this is for us."

— Kurt Busch, speaking after the race.

Kurt Busch performed a backwards victory lap while holding the checkered flag. He required assistance to move his car into victory lane, when he celebrated his second win of the season, and his first at Texas Motor Speedway, earning $440,575 in race winnings. Afterward, he said, "I knew what we had for fuel mileage – I was confident in our guys' numbers. They gave me what I needed to win [Sunday]. We were fast, we were playing cat-and-mouse with Kyle on restarts – you know, it's the first true time that Kyle and I have raced each other hard for a victory like this." Hamlin, who finished second, said "Hats off to Mike (Ford, crew chief) and this whole FedEx Office Camry team. We have a really good car, we just had to learn to stay in the pits. We just lost too many spots on pit road that we couldn't overcome that track position. I was trying to make something happen and got in the wall which ended up killing our car. The good part about that is I was able to save fuel because there was no pressure from behind. I was able to save fuel and our Camry got the best fuel mileage it got all day."

Kyle Busch did not speak to the press after the race. Rogers said of his drivers' performance, "I think he handled it well – it's tough. You lead all these laps and he could have gone for the clean sweep this weekend – win all three in a row. He deserved to win all three in a row and to get beat – it's tough.", he continued, "We're disappointed – this Toyota deserved to be in Victory Lane. I thought we had one of the best cars throughout the entire race, but it just didn't work out that way. We were a little short on fuel." Johnson initially blamed the third-lap accident that saw him place 38th and his Drivers' Championship lead reduced to 73 points on Hornish losing control of his car. Hornish attributed blame for the accident on Reutimann making contact with his car and him having no time to correct his vehicle. Five days after the race, Johnson changed his mind after briefly reviewing the race and speaking to Reutimann; he now thought that Hornish was dealing with handling difficulties and had slowed more than Reutimann thought.

Two days after the race, Earnhardt Ganassi Racing were given penalties for Truex's car. Earnhardt Ganassi Racing's penalty, for actions "detrimental to stock car racing", race equipment that did not conform to NASCAR rules, and for the ride height of Truex's car being too low, included a fine of $50,000 for crew chief Kevin Manion, and the loss of 50 owner and driver points for Teresa Earnhardt and Truex. Manion was also placed on probation until December 31, 2009. The car and power plant of race winner Kurt Busch, the vehicle and power unit of second-place finisher Hamlin, Martin's fourth-place entry and Jeff Gordon's engine were transported to the NASCAR Research and Development Center in Concord, North Carolina for inspection.

The race result left Johnson leading the Drivers' Championship with 6,297 points. Martin stood in second, seventy-three points behind Johnson, and thirty-nine ahead of Jeff Gordon, Kurt Busch who finished first, moved into fourth position with 6,126 points. Stewart was fifth, as Montoya, Biffle, Hamlin, Newman, and Kahne followed in the top ten positions. The final two positions available in the Chase for the Sprint Cup was occupied with Edwards in eleventh and Vickers in twelfth. In the Manufacturers' Championship, Chevrolet maintained their lead with 247 points. Toyota remained second with 192 points. Ford followed with 158 points, seven ahead of Dodge in fourth. 5.82 million people watched the race on television. The race took three hours, twenty-four minutes and eighteen seconds to complete, and the margin of victory was 25.686 seconds.

=== Race results ===
Finish	No.	Driver	Team	Manufacturer	Laps	Pts.
1	2	Kurt Busch	Penske Racing	Dodge	334	190^{1}
2	11	Denny Hamlin	Joe Gibbs Racing	Chevrolet	334	175^{1}
3	17	Matt Kenseth	Roush Fenway Racing	Ford	334	165
4	5	Mark Martin	Hendrick Motorsports	Chevrolet	334	160
5	29	Kevin Harvick	Richard Childress Racing	Chevrolet	334	155
6	14	Tony Stewart	Stewart–Haas Racing	Chevrolet	334	150
7	33	Clint Bowyer	Richard Childress Racing	Chevrolet	333	146
8	16	Greg Biffle	Roush Fenway Racing	Ford	333	142
9	31	Jeff Burton	Richard Childress Racing	Chevrolet	333	138
10	44	A.J. Allmedinger	Richard Petty Motorsports	Ford	333	134
11	18	Kyle Busch	Joe Gibbs Racing	Chevrolet	333	140^{2}
12	39	Ryan Newman	Stewart–Haas Racing	Chevrolet	333	127
13	24	Jeff Gordon	Hendrick Motorsports	Chevrolet	333	129^{1}
14	1	Martin Truex Jr.	Earnhardt Ganassi Racing	Chevrolet	333	121
15	47	Marcos Ambrose	JTG Daugherty Racing	Toyota	333	118
16	00	David Reutimann	Michael Waltrip Racing	Toyota	333	115
17	6	David Ragan	Furniture Row Racing	Ford	332	112
18	12	Scott Speed	Red Bull Racing Team	Toyota	332	109
19	21	Joey Logano	Joe Gibbs Racing	Chevrolet	332	106
20	26	Jamie McMurray	Roush Fenway Racing	Ford	332	103
21	07	Casey Mears	Richard Childress Racing	Chevrolet	332	100
22	19	Elliott Sadler	Richard Petty Motorsports	Dodge	332	97
23	55	Michael Waltrip	Michael Waltrip Racing	Toyota	331	94
24	34	John Andretti	Front Row Motorsports	Chevrolet	331	91
25	88	Dale Earnhardt Jr.	Hendrick Motorsports	Chevrolet	331	88
26	83	Brian Vickers	Red Bull Racing Team	Toyota	331	85
27	7	Robby Gordon	Robby Gordon Motorsports	Toyota	331	82
28	02	David Gilliland	Joe Gibbs Racing	Toyota	331	79
29	98	Paul Menard	Robert Yates Racing	Ford	331	76
30	96	Erik Darnell	Hall of Fame Racing	Ford	331	73
31	71	Bobby Labonte	TRG Motorsports	Chevrolet	331	70
32	78	Regan Smith	Furniture Row Racing	Chevrolet	330	67
33	9	Kasey Kahne	Richard Petty Motorsports	Dodge	330	64
34	21	Bill Elliott	Wood Brothers Racing	Ford	311	61
35	12	Brad Keselowski	Penske Championship Racing	Dodge	262	58
36	43	Reed Sorenson	Richard Petty Motorsports	Dodge	248	55
37	42	Juan Pablo Montoya	Earnhardt Ganassi Racing	Chevrolet	231	52
38	48	Jimmie Johnson	Hendrick Motorsports	Chevrolet	205	49
39	99	Carl Edwards	Roush Fenway Racing	Ford	174	46
40	77	Sam Hornish Jr.	Penske Racing	Dodge	88	43
41	36	Michael McDowell	Tommy Baldwin Racing	Toyota	20	40
42	87	Joe Nemechek	NEMCO Motorsports	Toyota	13	37
43	70	Mike Skinner	TRG Motorsports	Chevrolet	6	34
^{1} Includes five bonus points for leading a lap
^{2} Includes ten bonus points for leading the most laps

== Standings after the race ==
Drivers' Championship standings

Pos	+/–	Driver	Points
1		Jimmie Johnson	6,297
2		Mark Martin	6,224 (−73)
3		Jeff Gordon	6,185 (−112)
4	2	Kurt Busch	6,126 (−171)
5		Tony Stewart	6,119 (−178)
6	2	Juan Pablo Montoya	6,061 (−236)
7		Greg Biffle	6,050 (−247)
8	3	Denny Hamlin	5,975 (−322)
9	1	Ryan Newman	5,973 (−324)
10	1	Kasey Kahne	5,898 (−399)
11	1	Carl Edwards	5,857 (−440)
12		Brian Vickers	5,777 (−520)

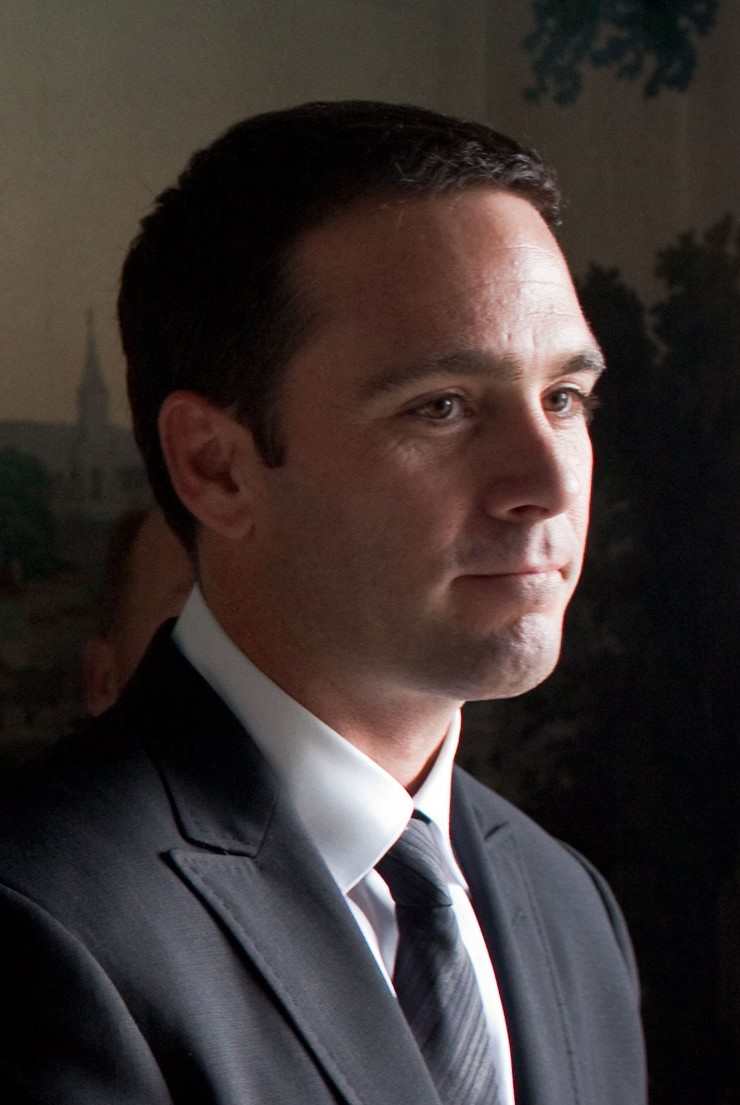
Jimmie Johnson remained the points leader with 6,297 points, after finishing thirty-eighth in the race.

Manufacturers' Championship standings

Pos	+/–	Manufacturer	Points
1		Chevrolet	247
2		Toyota	192 (−55)
3		Ford	158 (−89)
4		Dodge	151 (−96)

- Note: Only the top twelve positions are included for the driver standings. These drivers qualified for the Chase for the Sprint Cup.

Previous race: 2009 AMP Energy 500	Sprint Cup Series; 2009 season	Next race: 2009 Checker O'Reilly Auto Parts 500
