= Evernham Motorsports =

Former American racecar team

- Owner(s): Ray Evernham; George N. Gillett Jr.
- Base: Mooresville, North Carolina
- Series: NASCAR Cup Series
- Opened: 2000
- Closed: 2008

Career
- Debut: Cup Series; 2000 Chevrolet Monte Carlo 400 (Richmond) (as Evernham Motorsports); 2007 Centurion Boats at the Glen (Watkins Glen) (as Gillett Evernham Motorsports); Nationwide Series; 2003 Target House 200 (Rockingham); Craftsman Truck Series; 2006 GM Flex Fuel 250 (Daytona)
- Latest race: Cup Series; 2007 Pennsylvania 500 (as Evernham Motorsports); 2008 Ford 400 (as Gillett Evernham Motorsports); Craftsman Truck Series; 2006 Ford 200 (Homestead)
- Races competed: Total: 760; Cup Series: 626; 492 (as Evernham Motorsports); 134 (as Gillett Evernham Motorsports); Nationwide Series: 109; Craftsman Truck Series: 25
- Drivers' Championships: Total: 0 Cup Series: 0 Nationwide Series: 0 Craftsman Truck Series: 0
- Race victories: Total: 20; Cup Series: 15; 13 (as Evernham Motorsports); 2 (as Gillett Evernham Motorsports); Nationwide Series: 5 Craftsman Truck Series: 0
- Pole positions: Total: 32; Cup Series: 27; 23 (as Evernham Motorsports); 4 (as Gillett Evernham Motorsports); Nationwide Series: 5 Craftsman Truck Series: 0

Evernham Motorsports was an American professional stock car racing organization that competed in the NASCAR Cup Series. The team was founded in 2000 by former Hendrick Motorsports crew chief Ray Evernham, entering full-time competition as a two-car operation in 2001 and fielding additional full-time entries in alliances with Ultra Motorsports and the Valvoline corporation. The organization was renamed Gillett Evernham Motorsports in 2007 after former Montreal Canadiens and Liverpool F.C. owner George Gillett bought a controlling interest from founder Evernham, and merged with Petty Enterprises in 2009 to become Richard Petty Motorsports.

== Team history ==
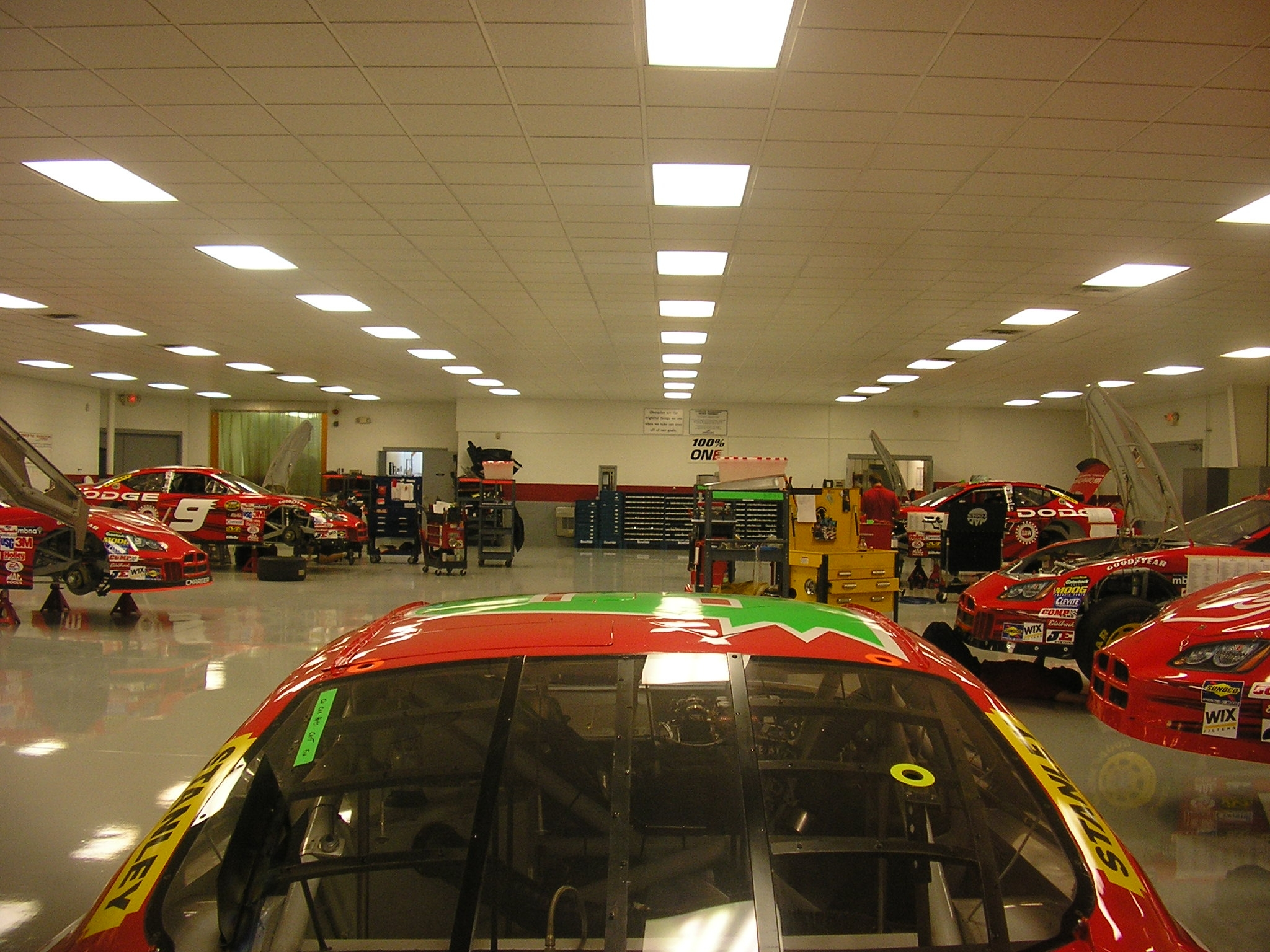
The Evernham Shop in 2005.

Evernham Motorsports was founded in 2000 by former crew chief Ray Evernham, who won three championships atop the pit box for Jeff Gordon and Hendrick Motorsports. Evernham was named a team manager and owner for Daimler Chrysler's return to NASCAR's top level through their Dodge brand, leading the development of the Intrepid R/T race car that debuted in 2001. The team also operated with direct factory backing and sponsorship from Dodge. The team originally operated out of the former facility of Bill Elliott Racing.

In August 2007, then Montreal Canadiens and Liverpool F.C. owner George N. Gillett Jr. purchased a majority stake in the race team. The operation was renamed Gillett Evernham Motorsports, with Ray Evernham retaining substantial ownership and the role of CEO. Evernham stated the partnership would allow him to focus on "racing operations and team performance", with the Gillett family handling the business end of the operation. GEM proceeded to hire several financial executives to assist with corporate marketing, including former chairman of LendingTree Tom Reddin to replace Evernham as CEO.

At the beginning of the 2008 season, GEM signed a technical and marketing agreement with independent driver Robby Gordon, with plans to eventually absorb Robby Gordon Motorsports into the GEM stable. Under the terms of the alleged merger, Gordon would sell his one-car-operation to GEM for $23.5 million, then receive a four-year contract worth $12 million to drive for the team. The deal fell through, with GEM suing Gordon for violating the terms of the agreement.

After the 2008 season, turmoil emerged when A. J. Allmendinger and Reed Sorenson were signed to drive for the team, while Elliott Sadler was released from his ride in the 19 car and planned to sue the team to keep his job. In the midst of a struggling economy, in January 2009 GEM merged with fellow Dodge team Petty Enterprises, which could no longer find sponsors for any of its cars, thus expanding the team to four cars. The organization was renamed Richard Petty Motorsports in the process. Ray Evernham was not involved in the merger negotiations, and both he and Richard Petty only maintained minority shares in the new team.

== NASCAR Cup Series ==
=== Car No. 7 history ===
On November 16, 2001, Ultra Motorsports announced they had entered into a joint venture with Evernham Motorsports where the team would switch to Dodge Intrepids from Ford. Casey Atwood, who had been driving Evernham's No. 19 and needed a ride once Jeremy Mayfield became the team's second driver, would take over the 7 car for the 2002 season. The venture was known as Ultra-Evernham Motorsports, with Ultra owner Jim Smith handling day-to-day operations and Evernham handling technical and competition aspects of the team. Ray Evernham described it as "doing two and a half teams." In January 2002, Sirius Satellite Radio was named as the sponsor for the 7 car. In his sophomore season, Atwood struggled severely, with a 29.4 average finish for the year and a best finish of 11th. The poor performance was attributed to a lack of competitive equipment (with the team using second-hand Evernham machines), and a lack of effort on driver Atwood's part. The partnership was dissolved after Smith decided to remove Atwood from the car with two races left in the season. Ultra Motorsports Truck Series driver Jason Leffler was named the interim driver. Jimmy Spencer would take over the car in 2003 for the once again independent Ultra Motorsports Dodge.

==== Car No. 7 results ====
Year	Driver	No.	Make	1	2	3	4	5	6	7	8	9	10	11	12	13	14	15	16	17	18	19	20	21	22	23	24	25	26	27	28	29	30	31	32	33	34	35	36	Owners	Pts
2002	Casey Atwood	7	Dodge	DAY; 35	CAR; 39	LVS; 41	ATL; 32	DAR; 26	BRI; 18	TEX; 35	MAR; 38	TAL; 26	CAL; 28	RCH; 22	CLT; 17	DOV; 14	POC; 11	MCH; 39	SON; 21	DAY; 20	CHI; 28	NHA; 36	POC; 28	IND; 38	GLN; 27	MCH; 42	BRI; 18	DAR; 28	RCH; 24	NHA; 34	DOV; 32	KAN; 42	TAL; 34	CLT; 30	MAR; 21	ATL; 38	CAR; 29	PHO	HOM	35th	2621

=== Car No. 9 history ===
Bill Elliott (2001–2003)

The No. 9 debuted in the 2001 Daytona 500 with Dodge's return to NASCAR. After half a decade as a driver and owner, 1988 Winston Cup Series champion Bill Elliott joined Evernham as a driver and re-assumed the No. 9 that he drove with Melling Racing. Elliott won the pole for the Daytona 500 and finished fifth. He marked the season with his first win in seven years at Homestead–Miami Speedway and finished 15th in points. Elliott would score two wins and finish 13th in points in 2002. He scored his final career win at North Carolina in fall 2003. After a ninth-place finish in the points that season, Elliott announced that due to the pressures of a full Nextel Cup schedule, he would step down from his full-time ride and would race the team's research and development car.

Kasey Kahne (2004–2008)

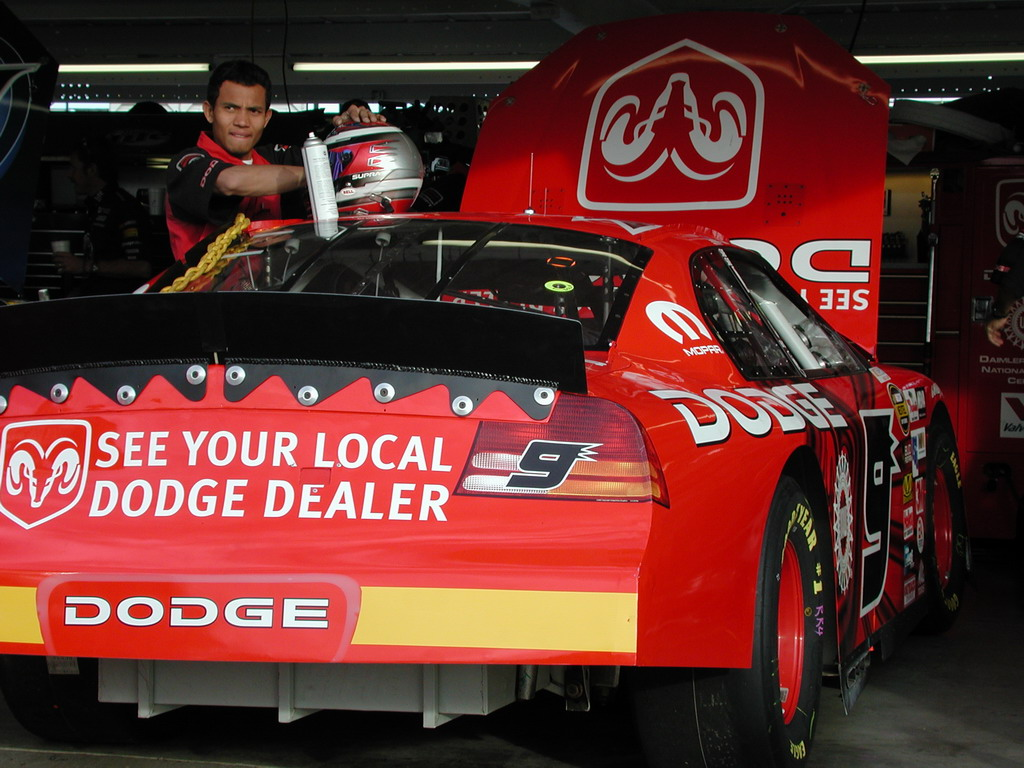
Kasey Kahne's 9 car in his rookie season of 2004.

Elliott was replaced by rookie driver Kasey Kahne, a successful open-wheel racer just starting to gain respect in the Busch Series, who left a development contract with Ford to sign with Evernham's Dodge team for the 2004 season. Tommy Baldwin Jr. would serve as crew chief for the No. 9 team. Kahne was arguably the least accomplished driver in a rookie class that included Busch Series winners Brian Vickers (the 2003 Champion), Scott Riggs, Scott Wimmer, and Johnny Sauter, as well as Craftsman Truck Series winner Brendan Gaughan. Kahne would have the strongest performance out of all the young drivers, earning three second-place finishes through the first eleven races and five on the season, including two close finishes with Matt Kenseth and Elliott Sadler. Kahne earned four poles and 14 Top 10 finishes to score a 13th-place finish in points, winning the Rookie of the Year honors by over 100 points. In 2005, he won the spring Richmond race, but finished 23rd in the final point standings.

Near the end of the 2005 season, Evernham initiated a crew swap between his teams, citing performance issues with both cars. As a result, Kahne received most of what was Mayfield's team from 2005. In 2006, Kahne won six races, including the prestigious Coca-Cola 600 at Lowe's Motor Speedway in May. He also made his first Chase for the Nextel Cup, finishing eighth in the standings at the end of the season. His six wins were a series high in 2006 and he also tied for the most pole awards with Kurt Busch at six. On September 18, 2007, it was announced that Budweiser would sponsor the No. 9 car beginning in 2008, after Dodge Dealers/Mopar/UAW had sponsored the team since 2001. In his first year with the Budweiser sponsorship, Kahne had two wins and finished 14th in points.

==== Car No. 9 results ====
Year	Driver	No.	Make	1	2	3	4	5	6	7	8	9	10	11	12	13	14	15	16	17	18	19	20	21	22	23	24	25	26	27	28	29	30	31	32	33	34	35	36	Owners	Pts
2001	Bill Elliott	9	Dodge	DAY; 5	CAR; 23	LVS; 14	ATL; 16	DAR; 23	BRI; 17	TEX; 14	MAR; 14	TAL; 32	CAL; 14	RCH; 37	CLT; 26	DOV; 40	MCH; 9	POC; 27	SON; 9	DAY; 35	CHI; 10	NHA; 21	POC; 4	IND; 8	GLN; 24	MCH; 3*	BRI; 19	DAR; 5	RCH; 17	DOV; 30	KAN; 40	CLT; 15	MAR; 42	TAL; 20	PHO; 27	CAR; 40	HOM; 1	ATL; 14	NHA; 22	15th	3824
2002	Bill Elliott	9	Dodge	DAY; 11	CAR; 11	LVS; 8	ATL; 35	DAR; 10	BRI; 21	TEX; 9	MAR; 31	TAL; 19	CAL; 4	RCH; 14	CLT; 9	DOV; 2	POC; 30	MCH; 11	SON; 8	DAY; 17	CHI; 7	NHA; 34	POC; 1	IND; 1*	GLN; 21	MCH; 22	BRI; 17	DAR; 3	RCH; 16	NHA; 23	DOV; 18	KAN; 5	TAL; 19	CLT; 35	MAR; 42	ATL; 33	CAR; 39	PHO; 30	HOM; 7	13th	4158
2003	Bill Elliott	9	Dodge	DAY; 32	CAR; 32	LVS; 14	ATL; 39	DAR; 9	BRI; 18	TEX; 43	TAL; 13	MAR; 13	CAL; 4	RCH; 20	CLT; 26	DOV; 22	POC; 19	MCH; 24	SON; 4	DAY; 16	CHI; 11	NHA; 31	POC; 17	IND; 5	GLN; 20	MCH; 15	BRI; 16	DAR; 5	RCH; 37	NHA; 4	DOV; 14	TAL; 13	KAN; 2*	CLT; 4	MAR; 9	ATL; 4	PHO; 14	CAR; 1*	HOM; 8*	9th	4303
2004	Kasey Kahne	9	Dodge	DAY; 41	CAR; 2	LVS; 2	ATL; 3	DAR; 13	BRI; 40	TEX; 2*	MAR; 21	TAL; 30	CAL; 13	RCH; 28	CLT; 12	DOV; 21	POC; 14	MCH; 2	SON; 31	DAY; 25	CHI; 36	NHA; 8	POC; 3	IND; 4	GLN; 14	MCH; 5	BRI; 21	CAL; 2	RCH; 24	NHA; 4	DOV; 42	TAL; 27	KAN; 12	CLT; 32*	MAR; 15	ATL; 5	PHO; 5	DAR; 5	HOM; 38	13th	4274
2005	Kasey Kahne	9	Dodge	DAY; 22	CAL; 40	LVS; 38	ATL; 5	BRI; 14	MAR; 2	TEX; 35	PHO; 17	TAL; 24	DAR; 3	RCH; 1*	CLT; 26	DOV; 35	POC; 27	MCH; 18	SON; 41	DAY; 16	CHI; 41	NHA; 6	POC; 27	IND; 2	GLN; 17	MCH; 29	BRI; 42	CAL; 6	RCH; 8	NHA; 38	DOV; 16	TAL; 13	KAN; 19	CLT; 23	MAR; 17	ATL; 35	TEX; 42	PHO; 27	HOM; 16	23rd	3611
2006	Kasey Kahne	9	Dodge	DAY; 11	CAL; 4	LVS; 4	ATL; 1	BRI; 10	MAR; 35	TEX; 1	PHO; 6	TAL; 39	RCH; 34	DAR; 21	CLT; 1	DOV; 7	POC; 7	MCH; 1	SON; 31	DAY; 25	CHI; 23	NHA; 8	POC; 31	IND; 36	GLN; 22	MCH; 4	BRI; 12	CAL; 1*	RCH; 3	NHA; 16	DOV; 38	KAN; 33	TAL; 2	CLT; 1*	MAR; 7	ATL; 38	TEX; 33	PHO; 7	HOM; 4*	8th	6173
2007	Kasey Kahne	9	Dodge	DAY; 7	CAL; 38	LVS; 35	ATL; 39	BRI; 19	MAR; 25	TEX; 20	PHO; 31	TAL; 12	RCH; 40	DAR; 20	CLT; 23	DOV; 11	POC; 22	MCH; 32	SON; 23	NHA; 25	DAY; 9	CHI; 32	IND; 40	POC; 27	GLN; 26	MCH; 31	BRI; 2*	CAL; 10	RCH; 8	NHA; 20	DOV; 32	KAN; 9	TAL; 16	CLT; 8	MAR; 15	ATL; 9	TEX; 18	PHO; 40	HOM; 24	19th	3489
2008	Kasey Kahne	9	Dodge	DAY; 7	CAL; 9	LVS; 6	ATL; 28	BRI; 7	MAR; 17	TEX; 25	PHO; 36	TAL; 23	RCH; 10	DAR; 22	CLT; 1	DOV; 31	POC; 1*	MCH; 2	SON; 33	NHA; 30	DAY; 7	CHI; 15	IND; 7	POC; 7	GLN; 14	MCH; 40	BRI; 40	CAL; 8	RCH; 19	NHA; 11	DOV; 26	KAN; 21	TAL; 36	CLT; 2	MAR; 33	ATL; 33	TEX; 24	PHO; 13	HOM; 6	14th	4085

=== Car No. 10 history ===
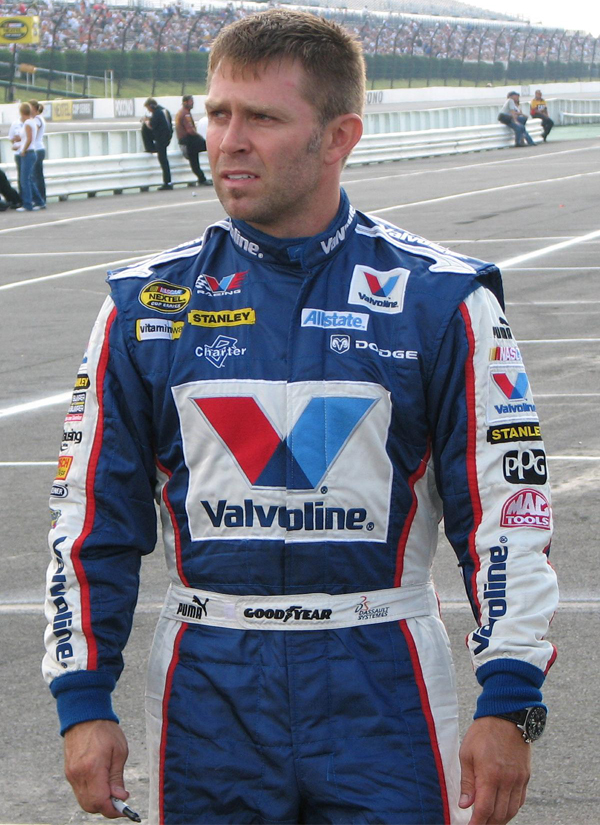
Scott Riggs drove the 10 for Evernham from 2006 to 2007.

Scott Riggs (2006–2007)

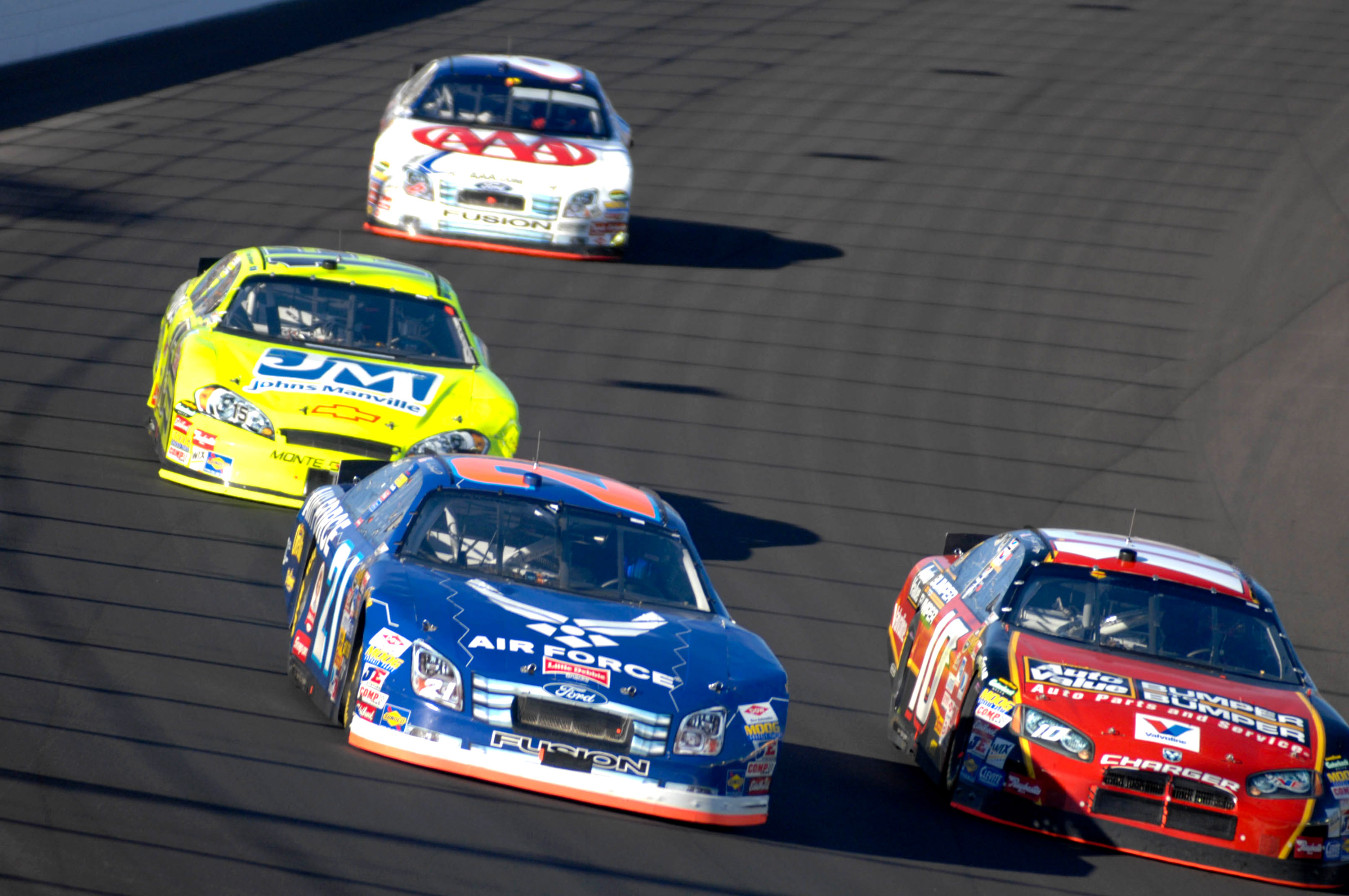
Riggs (right) at Las Vegas in 2007.

In 2006, Scott Riggs and his Valvoline sponsorship moved over from struggling MB2 Motorsports. In addition to sponsoring 22 races in 2006, Valvoline also maintained an ownership stake in the team through Senior Vice President James Rocco (like with MBV), called Valvoline-Evernham Motorsports (also written as Valvoline-Evernham Racing). The team nearly won on several occasions including Charlotte, Talladega, and Texas — where he crashed out in second place with two laps to go. He finished 20th in the final standings despite missing the Daytona 500. Going into 2007 with high hopes, Evernham's performance suffered; Riggs failed to qualify for six races and had five DNF's with only one Top 10 finish all season. He was released with two races remaining in favor of former Champ car driver Patrick Carpentier, who had also replaced him at Watkins Glen.

Patrick Carpentier (2007–2008)

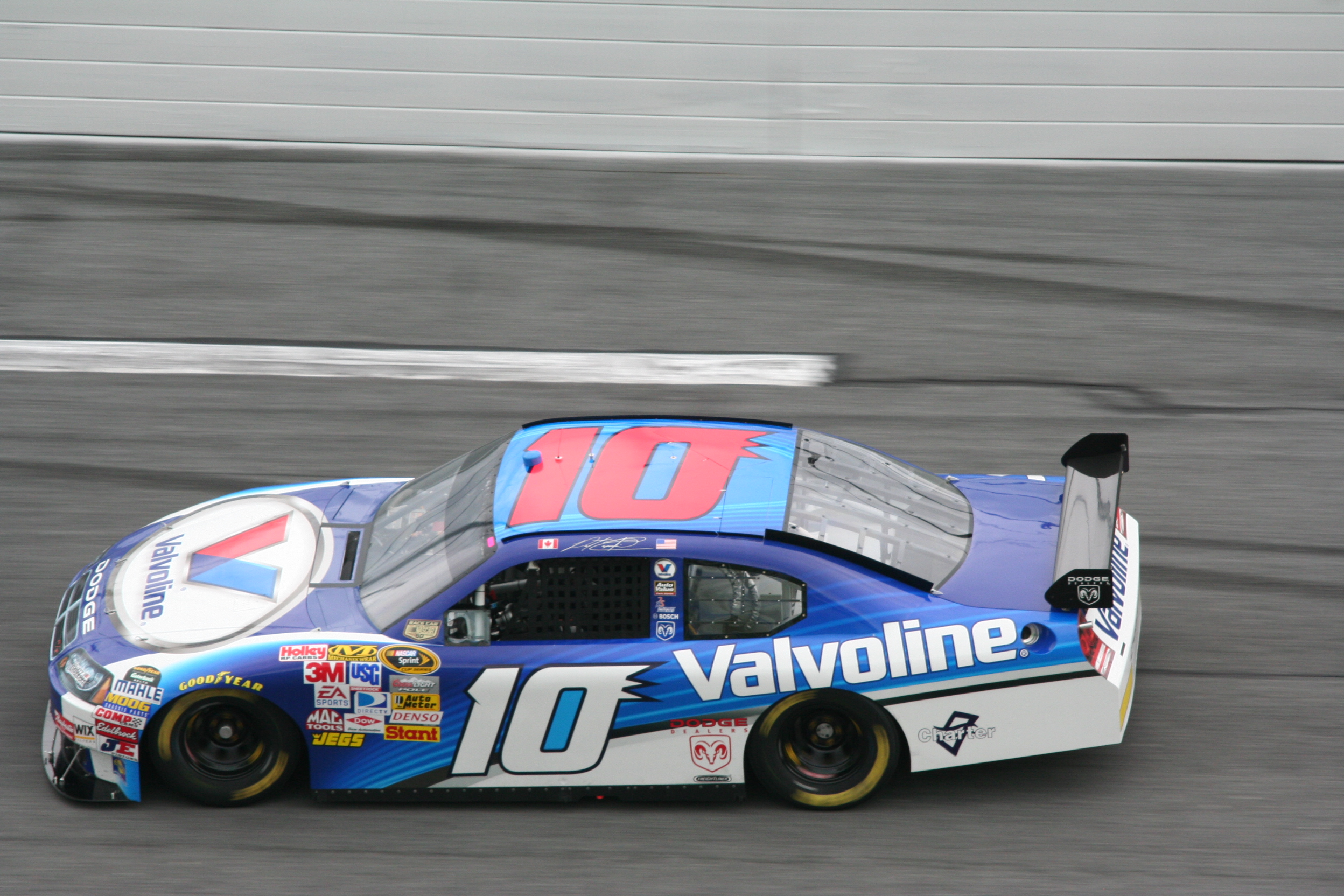
Patrick Carpentier at Daytona in 2008.

Carpentier, who was 36 years old at the time, became the full-time driver for 2008, part of a unique rookie class stacked with open wheel veterans all trying to emulate the success found by Juan Pablo Montoya the previous year. This included IndyCar Series Champions Dario Franchitti and Sam Hornish Jr., and CART and Formula One champion Jacques Villeneuve, as well as DEI development drivers Regan Smith and Aric Almirola. With Valvoline taking a backseat role in 2008 and Stanley Tools moving to the No. 19 car, GEM signed LifeLock for eight races, an identity security company making a large entrance investment into NASCAR. Charter Communications and Auto Value/Bumper to Bumper also sponsored several races. Carpentier won the pole at Loudon but otherwise struggled, as did his fellow open-wheel counterparts. He had no Top 10s, missed six races — including the Daytona 500 and at Pocono, where Terry Labonte drove in his place - and was out of the Top 35 in points when he was released after failing to qualify at Talladega. Mike Wallace drove at Charlotte, before second-year driver A. J. Allmendinger took over, after being released from Red Bull Racing in favor of Scott Speed. In his five races for GEM, Allmendinger was impressive, posting three Top 15s and often outrunning his teammates. Allmendinger was initially rewarded with a full-time ride in the No. 19 car, replacing Elliott Sadler. This was derailed when Sadler intended to sue the team and Allmendinger to keep his job, when Reed Sorenson was signed as a third driver, and when several sponsors threatened to leave the team in response to the recent moves.

==== Car No. 10 results ====
Year	Driver	No.	Make	1	2	3	4	5	6	7	8	9	10	11	12	13	14	15	16	17	18	19	20	21	22	23	24	25	26	27	28	29	30	31	32	33	34	35	36	Owners	Pts
2006	Scott Riggs	10	Dodge	DAY; DNQ	CAL; 19	LVS; 28	ATL; 11	BRI; 41	MAR; 10	TEX; 7	PHO; 38	TAL; 9	RCH; 14	DAR; 31	CLT; 13	DOV; 20	POC; 8	MCH; 29	SON; 27	DAY; 20	CHI; 15	NHA; 10	POC; 22	IND; 21	GLN; 23	MCH; 14	BRI; 4	CAL; 17	RCH; 10	NHA; 35	DOV; 34	KAN; 34	TAL; 19	CLT; 17	MAR; 30	ATL; 22	TEX; 31	PHO; 22	HOM; 7	20th	3619
2007	Scott Riggs	10	Dodge	DAY; 37	CAL; 41	LVS; 23	ATL; 43	BRI; 31	MAR; 8	TEX; 27	PHO; 42	TAL; 11	RCH; 30	DAR; DNQ	CLT; 20	DOV; 23	POC; 18	MCH; 33	SON; DNQ	NHA; DNQ	DAY; 41	CHI; DNQ	IND; 29	POC; 24		MCH; 36	BRI; 18	CAL; DNQ	RCH; 40	NHA; 32	DOV; 34	KAN; 13	TAL; DNQ	CLT; 36	MAR; 16	ATL; 29	TEX; 13			37th	3125
2007	Patrick Carpentier	10	Dodge																						GLN; 22													PHO; 33	HOM; 40	37th	3125
2008	Patrick Carpentier	10	Dodge	DAY; DNQ	CAL; DNQ	LVS; 40	ATL; 35	BRI; DNQ	MAR; 29	TEX; 28	PHO; 33	TAL; 31	RCH; 43	DAR; 40	CLT; 37	DOV; 29	POC; 32	MCH; 24	SON; 23	NHA; 31	DAY; 14	CHI; 30	IND; 18		GLN; 20	MCH; 30	BRI; DNQ	CAL; 18	RCH; 25	NHA; 31	DOV; 41	KAN; 29	TAL; DNQ							37th	2625
2008	Terry Labonte	10	Dodge																					POC; 32																37th	2625
2008	Mike Wallace	10	Dodge																															CLT; 31						37th	2625
2008	A. J. Allmendinger	10	Dodge																																MAR; 15	ATL; 14	TEX; 26	PHO; 16	HOM; 11	37th	2625

=== Car No. 19 history ===
Casey Atwood (2000–2001)

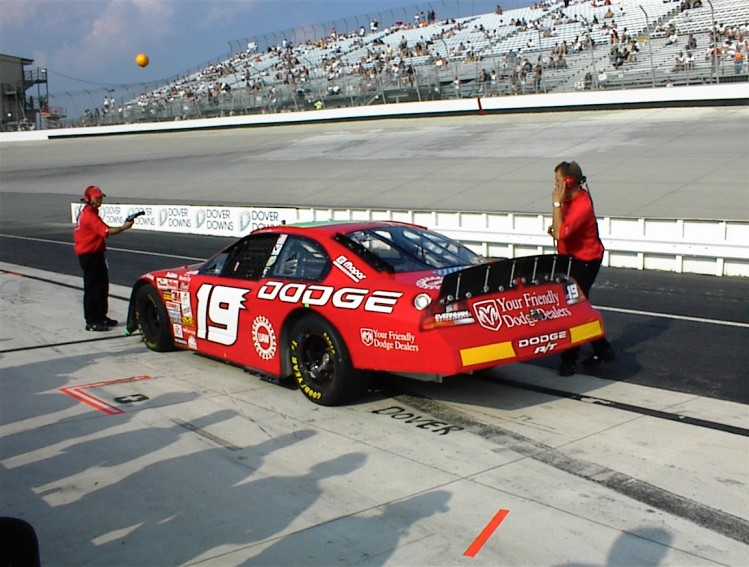
Casey Atwood in the No. 19 at Dover International Speedway in 2001

The No. 19 car was Evernham Motorsports' first foray into racing in the Cup series. It debuted in the 2000 Chevrolet Monte Carlo 400 at Richmond International Raceway as the No. 19 Motorola-sponsored Ford with 20-year-old Busch Series driver Casey Atwood as the driver. In that race, the car scored a 19th-place finish. The abbreviated season was capped off by Atwood's tenth-place finish at Homestead that year.

For Evernham's full-time debut in 2001, Atwood was named as the driver of the 19 car, teammate to Bill Elliott in the No. 9. The team was part of Dodge's return into NASCAR, with Dodge Dealers sponsoring the entire season. The year was off to a sluggish start when Atwood failed to qualify at the spring Atlanta race, but picked up steam towards the end of the year, winning the pole at Phoenix International Raceway, and almost winning the Homestead race before relinquishing the lead to teammate Elliott late in the race. Atwood barely missed wrestling the rookie of the year crown away from Kevin Harvick, despite Harvick finishing much higher in the points (ninth) and winning twice.

Jeremy Mayfield (2002–2006)

Evernham decided to make a driver change prior to the start of the 2002 season. He replaced Atwood with three-time Cup Series race winner Jeremy Mayfield, who had been fired from his ride at Team Penske before the end of the 2001 season. As part of the move, Evernham agreed to the aforementioned deal with Ultra Motorsports which gave Atwood a car to drive. Mayfield struggled in his initial year with Evernham, posting just four top tens and finishing 26th in points. He won a pole at Talladega Superspeedway the next year however, and improved to 19th in points. 2004 was even better, winning at Richmond and barely making the cut for the inaugural Chase for the Nextel Cup. He claimed one more win in 2005 and qualified once again for the Chase.

However, after the 2006 Allstate 400 at the Brickyard, where an early-race crash dropped the No. 19 team out of the top-35 in owner points (thus requiring the team to qualify for each race on time), owner Ray Evernham replaced Mayfield with Bill Elliott for the race at Watkins Glen, citing a lack of performance through the 2006 season. However, in affidavits filed in court Mayfield blamed his lack of performance and subsequent termination from the team on Evernham's heavy involvement with development driver Erin Crocker, and the "close personal relationship" that developed between the two.

Elliott Sadler (2006–2008)

On August 16, Elliott Sadler, after leaving Robert Yates Racing, was officially named the driver of the No. 19 car for the remainder of the 2006 season, as well as being named the driver for the 2007 season. In his first race, Sadler qualified second and finished tenth. This was the No. 19 car's best finish of the 2006 season until Sadler scored a sixth-place finish at New Hampshire several weeks later. Sadler finished 22nd in driver points, while the No. 19 team finished 34th in owner points, guaranteeing it a spot in the first five races of the 2007 season. Sadler would score only two top tens in 2007, finishing 25th in points.

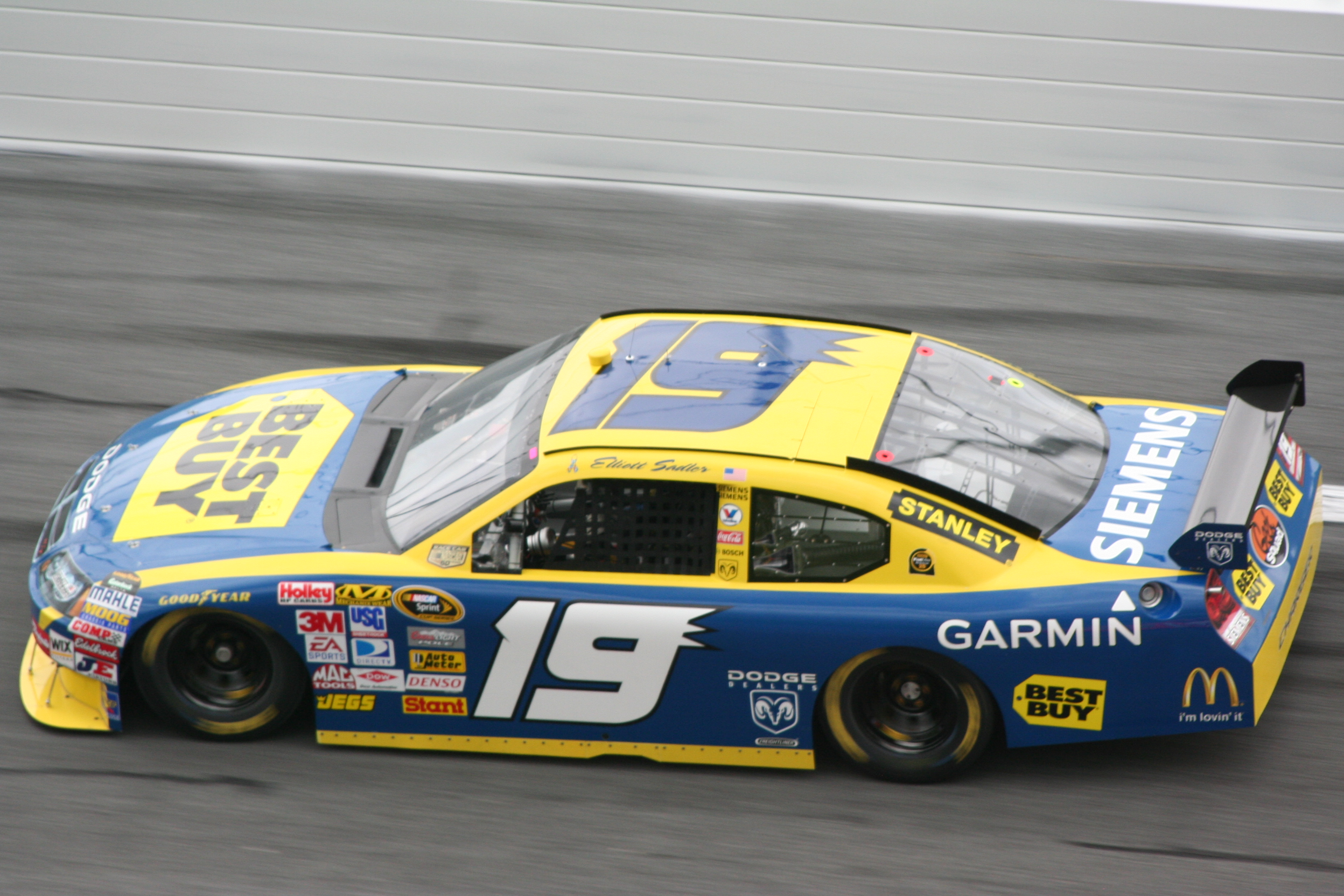
Elliott Sadler in the No. 19 in 2008.

In November 2007, Best Buy was announced as the new sponsor for fifteen races in the 2008 NASCAR Sprint Cup season. Later Stanley and McDonald's were announced as the two other primary sponsors on the No. 19. In May, Sadler reached a two-year contract extension with the team. However, on December 27, 2008, GEM announced that A. J. Allmendinger, who drove the team's No. 10 car at the end of the season, would be replacing Sadler in the No. 19 for the 2009 season. At the same time the team also announced several of its sponsors were considering leaving the team and that Ray Evernham had cleared his personal belongings out of the team's race shop, but it was not clear whether it was related to the hire. On January 3, 2009, Sadler's attorney announced that he would be seeking a breach of contract lawsuit against GEM for the dismissal. Looking to avoid the lawsuit GEM and Sadler's attorneys reached a settlement six days later that would return Sadler to the No. 19 for 2009 while keeping Allmendinger with the team.

==== Car No. 19 results ====
Year	Driver	No.	Make	1	2	3	4	5	6	7	8	9	10	11	12	13	14	15	16	17	18	19	20	21	22	23	24	25	26	27	28	29	30	31	32	33	34	35	36	Owners	Pts
2000	Casey Atwood	19	Ford	DAY	CAR	LVS	ATL	DAR	BRI	TEX	MAR	TAL	CAL	RCH	CLT	DOV	MCH	POC	SON	DAY	NHA	POC	IND	GLN	MCH	BRI	DAR	RCH; 19	NHA	DOV	MAR; 25	CLT	TAL	CAR	PHO	HOM; 10	ATL			54th	328
2001	Casey Atwood	19	Dodge	DAY; 20	CAR; 18	LVS; 24	ATL; DNQ	DAR; 26	BRI; 20	TEX; 36	MAR; 26	TAL; 30	CAL; 39	RCH; 12	CLT; 42	DOV; 29	MCH; 30	POC; 38	SON; 41	DAY; 28	CHI; 28	NHA; 12	POC; 15	IND; 41	GLN; 22	MCH; 10	BRI; 17	DAR; 25	RCH; 27	DOV; 9	KAN; 43	CLT; 24	MAR; 25	TAL; 39	PHO; 14	CAR; 20	HOM; 3	ATL; 20	NHA; 16	26th	3132
2002	Jeremy Mayfield	19	Dodge	DAY; 39	CAR; 29	LVS; 2	ATL; 23	DAR; 16	BRI; 14	TEX; 18	MAR; 11	TAL; 36	CAL; 38	RCH; 5	CLT; 39	DOV; 35	POC; 36	MCH; 36	SON; 28	DAY; 13	CHI; 34	NHA; 19	POC; 38	IND; 39	GLN; 15	MCH; 16	BRI; 25	DAR; 20	RCH; 10	NHA; 24	DOV; 20	KAN; 9	TAL; 20	CLT; 28	MAR; 28	ATL; 27	CAR; 21	PHO; 25	HOM; 33	26th	3309
2003	Jeremy Mayfield	19	Dodge	DAY; 8	CAR; 41	LVS; 21	ATL; 22	DAR; 30	BRI; 23	TEX; 25	TAL; 18	MAR; 40	CAL; 35	RCH; 25	CLT; 43	DOV; 21	POC; 15	MCH; 13	SON; 10	DAY; 8	CHI; 10	NHA; 34	POC; 38	IND; 41	GLN; 16	MCH; 28	BRI; 10	DAR; 6	RCH; 2	NHA; 11	DOV; 2	TAL; 38	KAN; 3	CLT; 12	MAR; 33	ATL; 7	PHO; 43	CAR; 3	HOM; 6	19th	3736
2004	Jeremy Mayfield	19	Dodge	DAY; 25	CAR; 11	LVS; 14	ATL; 2	DAR; 9	BRI; 17	TEX; 34	MAR; 36	TAL; 21	CAL; 14	RCH; 22	CLT; 8	DOV; 8	POC; 2	MCH; 19	SON; 30	DAY; 22	CHI; 5	NHA; 10	POC; 9	IND; 11	GLN; 7	MCH; 11	BRI; 22	CAL; 16	RCH; 1*	NHA; 35	DOV; 7	TAL; 38	KAN; 5*	CLT; 30	MAR; 6	ATL; 26	PHO; 21	DAR; 19	HOM; 35	10th	6000
2005	Jeremy Mayfield	19	Dodge	DAY; 23	CAL; 28	LVS; 20	ATL; 13	BRI; 17	MAR; 15	TEX; 11	PHO; 13	TAL; 4	DAR; 33	RCH; 13	CLT; 4	DOV; 14	POC; 14	MCH; 22	SON; 7	DAY; 12	CHI; 6	NHA; 19	POC; 18	IND; 4	GLN; 11	MCH; 1	BRI; 18	CAL; 26	RCH; 6	NHA; 16	DOV; 7	TAL; 14	KAN; 16	CLT; 11	MAR; 28	ATL; 38	TEX; 35	PHO; 24	HOM; 10	9th	6073
2006	Jeremy Mayfield	19	Dodge	DAY; 36	CAL; 22	LVS; 25	ATL; 41	BRI; 16	MAR; 26	TEX; 31	PHO; 26	TAL; 13	RCH; 32	DAR; 38	CLT; 15	DOV; 18	POC; 23	MCH; 36	SON; 22	DAY; 36	CHI; 24	NHA; 29	POC; 37	IND; 41																34th	2983
2006	Bill Elliott	19	Dodge																						GLN; 27															34th	2983
2006	Elliott Sadler	19	Dodge																							MCH; 10	BRI; 39	CAL; 16	RCH; 13	NHA; 6	DOV; 16	KAN; 40	TAL; 29	CLT; 35	MAR; 38	ATL; 21	TEX; 37	PHO; 17	HOM; 36	34th	2983
2007	Elliott Sadler	19	Dodge	DAY; 6	CAL; 24	LVS; 14	ATL; 18	BRI; 27	MAR; 24	TEX; 17	PHO; 34	TAL; 15	RCH; 27	DAR; 21	CLT; 36	DOV; 26	POC; 21	MCH; 35	SON; 14	NHA; 33	DAY; 33	CHI; 33	IND; 28	POC; 32	GLN; 17	MCH; 32	BRI; 29	CAL; 35	RCH; 27	NHA; 38	DOV; 17	KAN; 8	TAL; 24	CLT; 41	MAR; 40	ATL; 14	TEX; 12	PHO; 27	HOM; 38	25th	3140
2008	Elliott Sadler	19	Dodge	DAY; 6	CAL; 24	LVS; 12	ATL; 43	BRI; 19	MAR; 15	TEX; 26	PHO; 41	TAL; 29	RCH; 20	DAR; 42	CLT; 8	DOV; 42	POC; 34	MCH; 9	SON; 19	NHA; 5	DAY; 39	CHI; 12	IND; 4	POC; 27	GLN; 15	MCH; 9	BRI; 32	CAL; 34	RCH; 37	NHA; 24	DOV; 27	KAN; 10	TAL; 10	CLT; 20	MAR; 41	ATL; 25	TEX; 35	PHO; 30	HOM; 28	24th	3364

=== R&D car history ===
2002–2007

The 98 car started as the 91 car in 2002. Three drivers drove the No. 91: Dick Trickle at Talladega Superspeedway (failing to qualify); Hank Parker Jr. at Rockingham Speedway with sponsorship from USG Corporation; and Casey Atwood at Homestead–Miami Speedway with a sponsorship from Mountain Dew (after being released from the No. 7 car). The car returned in 2003 at Pocono Raceway and Indianapolis Motor Speedway, with Atwood driving the 91 Mountain Dew Live Wire-sponsored Dodge at Pocono and an unsponsored entry at Indy. In 2004, Bill Elliott relinquished his full-time duties to drive the No. 91 in a part-time deal at Las Vegas, Texas, and Indianapolis. Elliott also ran three races in a No. 98 Dodge under his own Bill Elliott Racing banner, utilizing Evernham equipment and crew members and the owners points of Mach 1 Racing, in part to avoid conflict with sponsor Coca-Cola (Evernham's No. 9 and No. 19 cars were both sponsored by Mountain Dew). He returned to drive the 91 in a part-time deal in 2005 in nine races held at Fontana, Atlanta, Texas, Charlotte, Michigan, Indianapolis, Michigan, Fontana, and Texas. Elliott had sponsorships from UAW, Coca-Cola, McDonald's, Stanley Tools, Auto Value / Bumper to Bumper, and Visteon.

==== Car No. 91 results ====
Year	Driver	No.	Make	1	2	3	4	5	6	7	8	9	10	11	12	13	14	15	16	17	18	19	20	21	22	23	24	25	26	27	28	29	30	31	32	33	34	35	36	Owners	Pts
2002	Dick Trickle	91	Dodge	DAY	CAR	LVS	ATL	DAR	BRI	TEX	MAR	TAL; DNQ	CAL	RCH	CLT	DOV	POC	MCH	SON	DAY	CHI	NHA	POC	IND	GLN	MCH	BRI	DAR	RCH	NHA	DOV	KAN	TAL	CLT	MAR	ATL				66th	111
2002	Hank Parker Jr.	91	Dodge																																		CAR; 33	PHO		66th	111
2002	Casey Atwood	91	Dodge																																				HOM; 37	66th	111
2003	Casey Atwood	91	Dodge	DAY	CAR	LVS	ATL	DAR	BRI	TEX	TAL	MAR	CAL	RCH	CLT	DOV	POC; 40	MCH	SON	DAY	CHI	NHA	POC	IND; 31	GLN	MCH	BRI	DAR	RCH	NHA	DOV	TAL	KAN	CLT	MAR	ATL	PHO	CAR	HOM	61st	113
2004	Bill Elliott	91	Dodge	DAY	CAR	LVS; 20	ATL	DAR	BRI	TEX; 36	MAR	TAL	CAL	RCH	CLT	DOV	POC	MCH	SON	DAY	CHI	NHA	POC	IND; 9	GLN	MCH	BRI	CAL	RCH	NHA	DOV	TAL	KAN	CLT	MAR	ATL	PHO	DAR	HOM	48th	595
2005	Bill Elliott	91	Dodge	DAY	CAL; 43	LVS	ATL; 22	BRI	MAR	TEX; 33	PHO	TAL	DAR	RCH	CLT; 20	DOV	POC	MCH; 35	SON	DAY	CHI	NHA	POC	IND; 23	GLN	MCH; 11	BRI	CAL; 40	RCH	NHA	DOV	TAL	KAN	CLT	MAR	ATL	TEX; 32	PHO	HOM	45th	695
2007	Boris Said	98	Dodge	DAY	CAL	LVS	ATL	BRI	MAR	TEX	PHO	TAL	RCH	DAR	CLT	DOV	POC	MCH	SON	NHA	DAY	CHI	IND	POC	GLN	MCH	BRI	CAL	RCH	NHA; 40	DOV	KAN	TAL	CLT	MAR	ATL	TEX	PHO	HOM	59th	43

== Nationwide Series ==
=== Car No. 9 history ===
Tommy Baldwin Racing (2002–2004)

The No. 9 Ultimate Chargers Busch team started as the No. 6 Pepsi-sponsored Dodge Intrepid for Tommy Baldwin Racing. The team made its debut in 2002 at the fall Michigan Busch Series race, where Wally Dallenbach Jr. drove the team to a 14th-place finish. Dallenbach finished in the top ten in his other two starts in the car that year, splitting the car with Damon Lusk. Lusk took over on a limited basis for 2003 but did not finish in the top 10.

In 2004, primary sponsor Unilever backed the Hungry Drivers program to allow for young drivers to compete for a full-time seat in NASCAR. Four drivers were chosen to compete for the seat and the chosen drivers were Scott Lynch, Mark McFarland, Tracy Hines, and Paul Wolfe. Each driver was given three races to prove their talent. After scoring 2 top-20 finishes, including a 12th-place effort at New Hampshire, Wolfe was awarded the No. 6 Busch seat for the 2005 season.

Evernham Motorsports (2005–2008)

In October 2004, Evernham Motorsports acquired Tommy Baldwin Racing, and with it, the Hungry Drivers program. Paul Wolfe started out the 2005 season, but was let go after the first four races due to poor performance. Kasey Kahne and Jeremy Mayfield took the brunt of the driving duties of the No. 6 team with Kahne scoring the team's first win at Kansas in October. Other drivers would also share in the driving duties of the car, including Mike Wallace, Tracy Hines, Bill Elliott, Casey Atwood, and also Paul Wolfe for three races. Erin Crocker would also make her Busch Series racing debut with the team at Richmond.

For the 2006 season, a number of changes were made to the team. First, a number switch with Roush Racing gave Evernham the No. 9 to use for his team while the No. 6 went with Mark Martin's Busch team. Also, Unilever's sponsorship of the team was expanded. Now called the Ultimate Chargers team, it would feature Kasey Kahne, Jeremy Mayfield, and Scott Riggs as the main drivers of the car throughout the year. Crocker, who competed under the No. 98 with sponsorship from General Mills, and Boris Said also shared driving duties in the car. Kahne, who drove the majority of races for the team, won twice at Las Vegas in the spring and Fontana in the fall. In 2007, Kahne won the spring race at Charlotte and the fall race at Bristol with sponsorship again from Unilever. Kahne, Elliott Sadler, Scott Riggs, Boris Said, and Chase Miller shared the brunt of the driving duties in the car. Deac McCaskill drove for the team in a single race at O'Reilly Raceway Park at Indianapolis.

In 2008, Unilever, along with additional backing from AutoValue/Bumper-to-Bumper and Ingersoll Rand, continued sponsorship of the team with Kahne, Sadler, Patrick Carpentier, and Chase Miller sharing driving duties in the car through the year. Results were mixed for the Nationwide GEM team. For the first time since the program's inception, the team failed to record a win. The car's best results were two second-place finishes. The first was recorded by Kasey Kahne in the spring race at Bristol while Patrick Carpentier finished 2nd in the race at Montreal.

Later in the year, it was announced that primary sponsor Unilever would move to the No. 5 of JR Motorsports. As a result of the loss of the sponsor, the organization announced that the car would move to a part-time schedule for the 2009 season. With the cutback, the team also let go about 65 employees, some of whom were also from the engine shop.

=== Car No. 19 history ===
Evernham No. 79 (2003, 2005)

In the 2003 season, the team debuted with Jeremy Mayfield driving the No. 79 Dodge Intrepid, with Mountain Dew sponsoring, at Rockingham. He finished 4th in the only race for the team that year. The team returned for the 2005 season, operating as a 2nd Busch team. Sponsorship for this car came mainly from Trus Joist and Auto Value. Kahne and Mayfield shared the driving duties for the three races the team ran with a best finish of 4th at Richmond in May. Kahne also drove the car to a 12th-place finish at New Hampshire and Mayfield had a best finish of 29th at Charlotte. While the team didn't run in 2006, a couple of the chassis from the No. 79 were run by Erin Crocker in her first couple of races.

Evernham No. 19 (2007–2008)

In the last race of the 2007 season at Homestead–Miami Speedway, Patrick Carpentier made his second Busch Series start. The car was the No. 19 sponsored by Stanley.

Chase Miller drove the car as a second GEM car in select Nationwide Series races in 2008, with sponsorship from Cellco Partnerships (a joint venture of Verizon and Vodafone) on the car. The team was retired once the Braun-Petty deal was announced.

== Truck Series and ARCA ==
=== Casey Atwood (2002) ===
In 2002, Casey Atwood ran a Dodge-sponsored No. 19 car at Pocono Raceway in the ARCA Racing Series, winning the race from the pole.

=== Erin Crocker (2005–2007) ===
In 2005, Erin Crocker made her ARCA Racing Series debut in a No. 98 Dodge at Nashville Superspeedway. Crocker won the pole, and finished 12th after leading 28 laps. Crocker would run six more races with another pole at Kentucky and five top five finishes. Crocker ran seven more ARCA races in 2006, and moved up to NASCAR's Craftsman Truck Series full-time with sponsorship from General Mills brands Cheerios and Betty Crocker. Crocker would score another Kentucky pole and three top tens in ARCA, but the success would not translate in the Truck Series, with a best finish of 16th twice leading to a 25th finish in the championship standings. General Mills would leave at the end of the season, leading the Truck Series team to close. Crocker returned to ARCA for 12 races in 2007, with Mac Tools sponsoring five races. Crocker won the pole at Daytona and her third consecutive Kentucky pole, scoring six top fives and eight total top ten finishes.
