= 2008 Chevy Rock & Roll 400 =

Race details
- Race 26 of 36 in the 2008 NASCAR Sprint Cup Series season
- Richmond International Speedway
- Date: September 7, 2008
- Official name: Chevy Rock & Roll 400
- Location: Richmond Fairgrounds, Richmond, Virginia
- Course: Permanent racing facility
- Course length: 0.75 miles (1.207 km)
- Distance: 400 laps, 300.0 mi (482.803 km)
- Weather: Temperatures reaching up to 86 °F (30 °C); wind speeds up to 8 miles per hour (13 km/h)
- Average speed: 92.68 miles per hour (149.15 km/h)

Pole position
| Driver | Kyle Busch | Joe Gibbs Racing |

Most laps led
| Driver | David Reutimann | Michael Waltrip Racing |
- Laps: 104

Winner
| No. 48 | Jimmie Johnson | Hendrick Motorsports |

Television in the United States
- Network: ESPN
- Announcers: Jerry Punch; Dale Jarrett; Andy Petree

The 2008 Chevy Rock & Roll 400 was the twenty-sixth race of the 2008 NASCAR Sprint Cup season and served as the final "regular season" race before the 2008 Chase for the Sprint Cup, where the top twelve drivers were "locked into" the ten-race playoff.

== Summary ==
The 400 lap (300 miles (480 km)) event was scheduled to have been held on Saturday night, September 6 at the 0.75 miles (1.21 km) Richmond International Raceway in Henrico County, Virginia, outside Richmond, the Commonwealth's capital city. However, Hurricane Hanna altered the plans and forced the race to be moved to the next day, September 7 at 1 PM EDT. This was to have been the first race to be carried on ABC, however due to a prior commitment to carry both a WNBA game and an IndyCar Series race in Chicago, ESPN carried the race. In place of the race that night, ABC aired the movie Catch Me If You Can. Radio coverage via MRN along with Sirius Satellite Radio commenced at 12 noon EDT Sunday.

=== Chasing The Chase ===
As this is the final race before the Chase is set, five drivers have clinched their positions in the 2008 playoff, while two more will clinch a spot when the green flag drops.

Kyle Busch, Carl Edwards, Jimmie Johnson, Dale Earnhardt Jr. and Jeff Burton have all wrapped up positions in the Chase, where Kyle Busch will be ranked number one with at least 5,080 points. Edwards will be seeded second with a minimum of 5,050 points, even though he has six wins; one win was taken away as part of punishment after a post-race inspection following the UAW-Dodge 400 at Las Vegas in March.

Greg Biffle and Kevin Harvick were exempt as per the Top 35 Owner Points standings rule, both started the race and clinched spots. This left seven drivers and five spaces in the chase. With the assumption that both past two-time champion Tony Stewart and 2003 series champion Matt Kenseth made the chase, the three that were "sitting on the bubble" are all qualifiers from last year's Chase: four-time series champion Jeff Gordon, Clint Bowyer and Denny Hamlin.

Just below them were David Ragan, who was 17 points out of the chase in 13th and Kasey Kahne, 48 points out of the chase in 14th. In addition, both Hamlin and Bowyer had won races in the Commonwealth of Virginia this season, and they carried a ten-point bonus into the Chase if they make it; Hamlin winning the spring event at Martinsville and Bowyer the most recent Richmond race. Kahne held two wins (the Memorial Day Charlotte race and the June race at Pocono); Ragan has not won a race despite being the most improved driver this season, while Jeff Gordon's last win was last October in Charlotte.

== Pre-race news ==
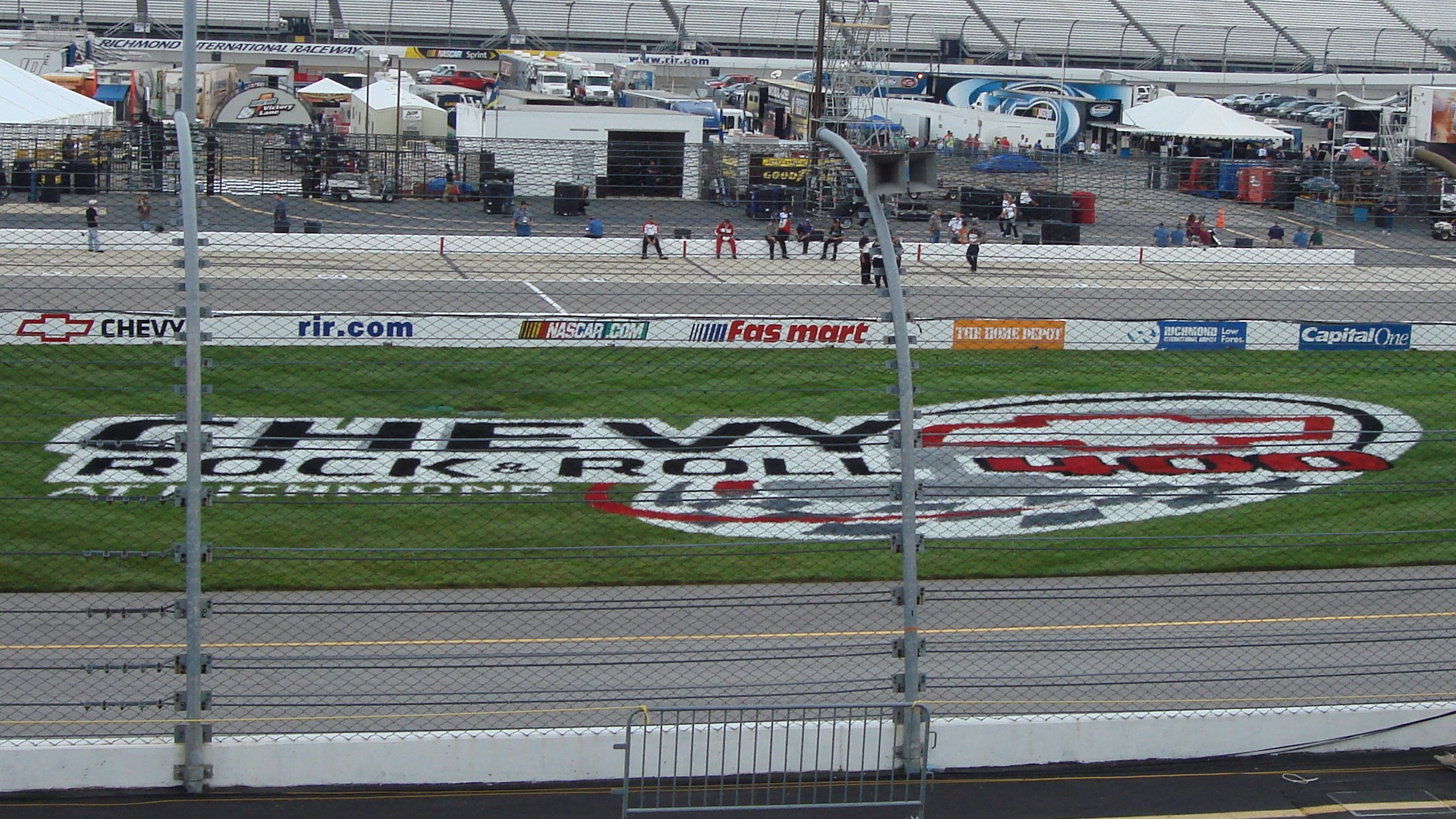
Rock & Roll 400 Logo

- As announced last week, 18-year-old sensation Joey Logano moved into the #20 Toyota at Joe Gibbs Racing after Tony Stewart leaves. He was to have attempted to qualify for this week's race driving the #02 ride. Tropical Storm Hanna had other ideas as qualifying was cancelled, and because he was outside the Top 35, he did not make the race. Logano will later try to run five races for Hall of Fame Racing in the #96 car later this season, and two more in the #02.
- NASCAR began a new drug testing policy within the next few weeks, and will now use random drug testing on all drivers, crews and other personnel as part of the new program. This puts the stock car sanctioning body with all the other major North American sports on random testing.
- David Stremme, who lost his ride to Dario Franchitti, became the new driver of the #12 Penske Racing Dodge in 2009. Stremme had been driving in the Nationwide Series and was a test driver for PR this year.

=== Qualifying ===
As earlier stated, Hanna caused the cancellation of the qualifying of the race, and the field was set by the rulebook.

Failed to make race as a result of qualifying being cancelled by rain: Joey Logano (#02), Sterling Marlin (#09), Tony Raines (#34).

== Race Recap ==
David Reutimann dominated the race and led 104 laps, but a braking problem cut his hopes short. It was Jimmie Johnson who took over and won the race by holding off a determined Tony Stewart. David Ragan's chances of making the chase were all but finished when he was involved in an incident with teammate Matt Kenseth. Jimmie Johnson held off Tony Stewart and win the first daytime fall race at Richmond since 1990.

It was the first Sprint Cup race since the 2007 Sylvania 300 where all 43 cars started finished the race, with no retirements.

Top Ten Finishers
| Pos | Car # | Driver | Make | Team |
|---|---|---|---|---|
| 1 | 48 | Jimmie Johnson | Chevrolet | Hendrick Motorsports |
| 2 | 20 | Tony Stewart | Toyota | Joe Gibbs Racing |
| 3 | 11 | Denny Hamlin | Toyota | Joe Gibbs Racing |
| 4 | 88 | Dale Earnhardt Jr. | Chevrolet | Hendrick Motorsports |
| 5 | 8 | Mark Martin | Chevrolet | Dale Earnhardt, Inc. |
| 6 | 31 | Jeff Burton | Chevrolet | Richard Childress Racing |
| 7 | 29 | Kevin Harvick | Chevrolet | Richard Childress Racing |
| 8 | 24 | Jeff Gordon | Chevrolet | Hendrick Motorsports |
| 9 | 44 | David Reutimann | Toyota | Michael Waltrip Racing |
| 10 | 5 | Casey Mears | Chevrolet | Hendrick Motorsports |

Drivers in green made Chase for Sprint Cup.

| Previous race: 2008 Pepsi 500 | Sprint Cup Series; 2008 season | Next race: 2008 Sylvania 300 |
