= 2007 Pennsylvania 500 =

Race details
- Race 21 of 36 in the 2007 NASCAR Nextel Cup Series season
- The 2007 Pennsylvania 500 program cover.
- Date: August 5, 2007
- Official name: Pennsylvania 500
- Location: Pocono Raceway, Long Pond, Pennsylvania
- Course: Permanent racing facility
- Course length: 2.5 miles (4.023 km)
- Distance: 200 laps, 500 mi (804.672 km)
- Weather: Temperatures reaching up to 89.1 °F (31.7 °C); wind speeds up to 8 miles per hour (13 km/h)
- Average speed: 131.627 miles per hour (211.833 km/h)

Pole position
Driver	Dale Earnhardt Jr.	Dale Earnhardt, Inc.
- Time: 52.949

Most laps led
Driver	Kurt Busch	Penske Racing
- Laps: 175

Winner
No. 2	Kurt Busch	Penske Racing

Television in the United States
- Network: ESPN
- Announcers: Jerry Punch, Andy Petree and Rusty Wallace

The 2007 Pennsylvania 500, the twenty-first race of the 2007 NASCAR Nextel Cup season was held on Sunday, August 5, 2007, at Pocono Raceway in Long Pond, Pennsylvania.

The layout of Pocono Raceway, the venue where the race was held.

== Background ==
#	Driver	Team	Make
00	David Reutimann	Michael Waltrip Racing	Toyota
01	Mark Martin	Dale Earnhardt, Inc.	Chevrolet
1	Martin Truex Jr.	Dale Earnhardt, Inc.	Chevrolet
2	Kurt Busch	Penske Racing South	Dodge
4	Ward Burton	Morgan–McClure Motorsports	Chevrolet
5	Kyle Busch	Hendrick Motorsports	Chevrolet
6	David Ragan	Roush Fenway Racing	Ford
7	P.J. Jones	Robby Gordon Motorsports	Ford
07	Clint Bowyer	Richard Childress Racing	Chevrolet
8	Dale Earnhardt Jr.	Dale Earnhardt, Inc.	Chevrolet
9	Kasey Kahne	Evernham Motorsports	Dodge
10	Scott Riggs	Evernham Motorsports	Dodge
11	Denny Hamlin	Joe Gibbs Racing	Chevrolet
12	Ryan Newman	Penske Racing South	Dodge
15	Paul Menard	Dale Earnhardt, Inc.	Chevrolet
16	Greg Biffle	Roush Fenway Racing	Ford
17	Matt Kenseth	Roush Fenway Racing	Ford
18	J.J. Yeley	Joe Gibbs Racing	Chevrolet
19	Elliott Sadler	Evernham Motorsports	Dodge
20	Tony Stewart	Joe Gibbs Racing	Chevrolet
21	Bill Elliott	Wood Brothers Racing	Ford
22	Dave Blaney	Bill Davis Racing	Toyota
24	Jeff Gordon	Hendrick Motorsports	Chevrolet
25	Casey Mears	Hendrick Motorsports	Chevrolet
26	Jamie McMurray	Roush Fenway Racing	Ford
29	Kevin Harvick	Richard Childress Racing	Chevrolet
31	Jeff Burton	Richard Childress Racing	Chevrolet
36	Jeremy Mayfield	Bill Davis Racing	Toyota
37	Kevin Lepage	Front Row Motorsports	Dodge
38	David Gilliland	Robert Yates Racing	Ford
40	David Stremme	Chip Ganassi Racing with Felix Sabates	Dodge
41	Reed Sorenson	Chip Ganassi Racing with Felix Sabates	Dodge
42	Juan Pablo Montoya	Chip Ganassi Racing with Felix Sabates	Dodge
43	Bobby Labonte	Petty Enterprises	Dodge
44	Dale Jarrett	Michael Waltrip Racing	Toyota
45	Kyle Petty	Petty Enterprises	Dodge
48	Jimmie Johnson	Hendrick Motorsports	Chevrolet
49	Mike Bliss	BAM Racing	Dodge
55	Michael Waltrip	Michael Waltrip Racing	Toyota
66	Jeff Green	Haas CNC Racing	Chevrolet
70	Johnny Sauter	Haas CNC Racing	Chevrolet
78	Kenny Wallace	Furniture Row Racing	Chevrolet
83	Brian Vickers	Red Bull Racing Team	Toyota
84	A.J. Allmendinger	Red Bull Racing Team	Toyota
88	Ricky Rudd	Robert Yates Racing	Ford
96	Tony Raines	Hall of Fame Racing	Chevrolet
99	Carl Edwards	Roush Fenway Racing	Ford

== Qualifying ==
Dale Earnhardt Jr. won the pole position after being allowed to requalify when a rainstorm interrupted his attempt which resulted in a 45-minute rain delay. NASCAR allowed Earnhardt to put on new tires and cool down his car because of the delay, when temperatures cooled down.

Pos.	#	Driver	Team	Make	Time	Speed
1	8	Dale Earnhardt Jr.	Dale Earnhardt, Inc.	Chevrolet	52.949	169.975
2	2	Kurt Busch	Penske Racing South	Dodge	52.984	169.863
3	5	Kyle Busch	Hendrick Motorsports	Chevrolet	53.009	169.782
4	12	Ryan Newman	Penske Racing South	Dodge	53.023	169.738
5	9	Kasey Kahne	Evernham Motorsports	Dodge	53.070	169.587
6	11	Denny Hamlin	Joe Gibbs Racing	Chevrolet	53.097	169.501
7	48	Jimmie Johnson	Hendrick Motorsports	Chevrolet	53.153	169.323
8	25	Casey Mears	Hendrick Motorsports	Chevrolet	53.170	169.268
9	42	Juan Pablo Montoya	Chip Ganassi Racing with Felix Sabates	Dodge	53.281	168.916
10	41	Reed Sorenson	Chip Ganassi Racing with Felix Sabates	Dodge	53.367	168.644
11	24	Jeff Gordon	Hendrick Motorsports	Chevrolet	53.428	168.451
12	16	Greg Biffle	Roush Fenway Racing	Ford	53.432	168.438
13	1	Martin Truex Jr.	Dale Earnhardt, Inc.	Chevrolet	53.476	168.300
14	19	Elliott Sadler	Evernham Motorsports	Dodge	53.496	168.237
15	07	Clint Bowyer	Richard Childress Racing	Chevrolet	53.549	168.070
16	10	Scott Riggs	Evernham Motorsports	Dodge	53.590	167.942
17	96	Tony Raines	Hall of Fame Racing	Chevrolet	53.596	167.923
18	31	Jeff Burton	Richard Childress Racing	Chevrolet	53.598	167.917
19	22	Dave Blaney	Bill Davis Racing	Toyota	53.615	167.863
20	88	Ricky Rudd	Robert Yates Racing	Ford	53.639	167.788
21	21	Bill Elliott	Wood Brothers Racing	Ford	53.640	167.785
22	26	Jamie McMurray	Roush Fenway Racing	Ford	53.697	167.607
23	29	Kevin Harvick	Richard Childress Racing	Chevrolet	53.758	167.417
24	20	Tony Stewart	Joe Gibbs Racing	Chevrolet	53.788	167.324
25	01	Mark Martin	Dale Earnhardt, Inc.	Chevrolet	53.809	167.258
26	43	Bobby Labonte	Petty Enterprises	Dodge	53.822	167.218
27	18	J.J. Yeley	Joe Gibbs Racing	Chevrolet	53.842	167.156
28	83	Brian Vickers	Red Bull Racing Team	Toyota	53.875	167.053
29	99	Carl Edwards	Roush Fenway Racing	Ford	53.881	167.035
30	7	Robby Gordon*	Robby Gordon Motorsports	Ford	53.911	166.942
31	00	David Reutimann	Michael Waltrip Racing	Toyota	53.982	166.722
32	66	Jeff Green	Haas CNC Racing	Chevrolet	53.993	166.688
33	38	David Gilliland	Robert Yates Racing	Ford	54.026	166.586
34	40	David Stremme	Chip Ganassi Racing with Felix Sabates	Dodge	54.133	166.257
35	15	Paul Menard	Dale Earnhardt, Inc.	Chevrolet	54.196	166.064
36	6	David Ragan	Roush Fenway Racing	Ford	54.254	165.886
37	17	Matt Kenseth	Roush Fenway Racing	Ford	54.293	165.767
38	4	Ward Burton	Morgan–McClure Motorsports	Chevrolet	54.349	165.596
39	55	Michael Waltrip	Michael Waltrip Racing	Toyota	54.353	165.584
40	44	Dale Jarrett	Michael Waltrip Racing	Toyota	54.355	165.578
41	70	Johnny Sauter	Haas CNC Racing	Chevrolet	54.361	165.560
42	45	Kyle Petty	Petty Enterprises	Dodge	54.692	164.558
Last car to make it on time (not locked in by owner's points)
43	36	Jeremy Mayfield	Bill Davis Racing	Toyota	54.367	165.542
Failed to qualify
44	49	Mike Bliss	BAM Racing	Dodge	54.382	165.496
45	84	A.J. Allmendinger	Red Bull Racing Team	Toyota	54.651	164.681
46	37	Kevin Lepage	Front Row Motorsports	Dodge	54.982	163.690
47	78	Kenny Wallace	Furniture Row Racing	Chevrolet	55.454	162.297

Kevin Lepage (#37), Mike Bliss (#49), Kenny Wallace (#78) and A. J. Allmendinger (#84) all failed to make the race.

== Race ==
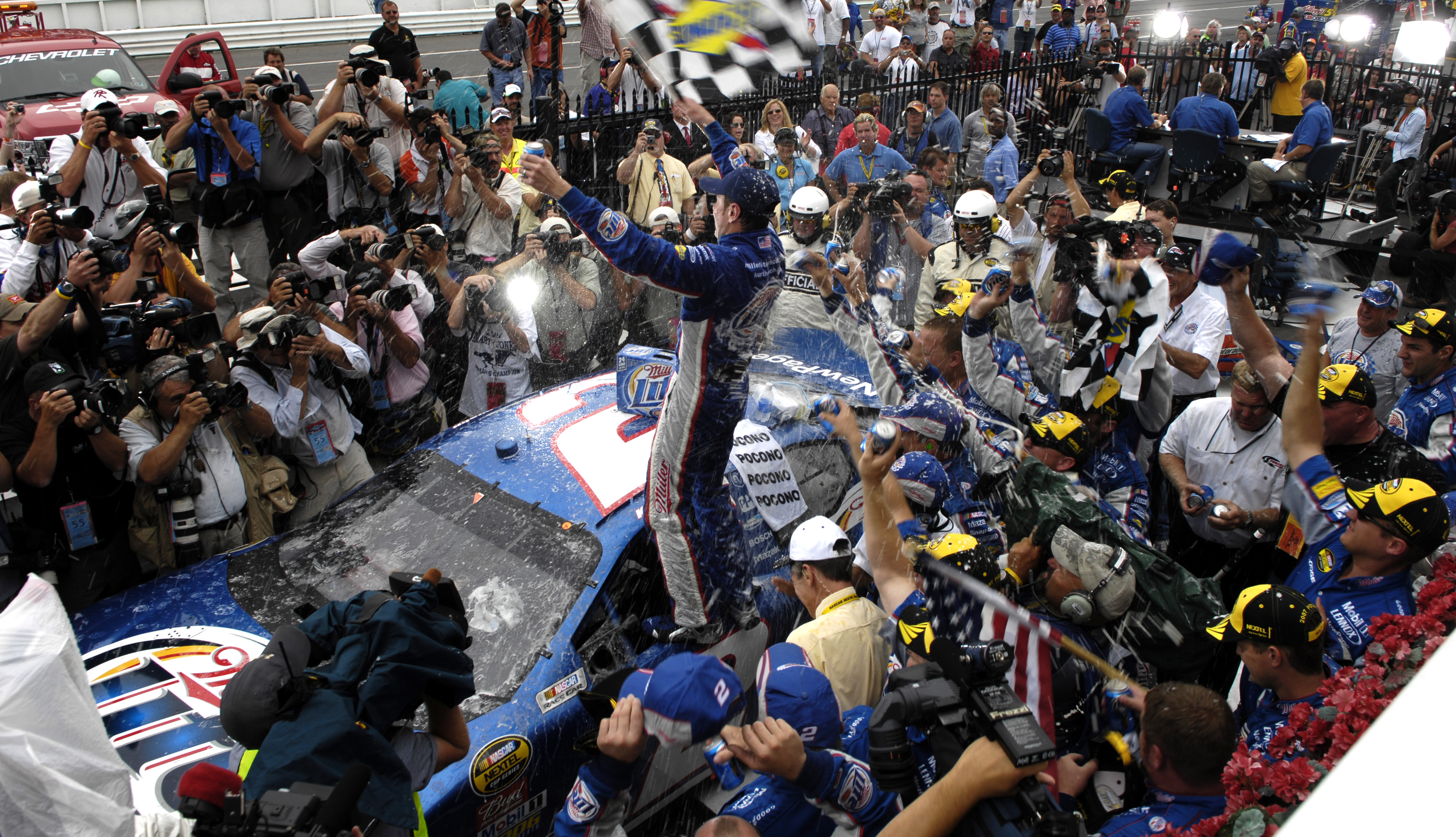
Kurt Busch celebrating winning the Pennsylvania 500.

Outside polesitter Kurt Busch would be the class of the field, dominating for 175 of 200 laps and taking his first victory since the Food City 500 at Bristol Motor Speedway in March 2006. While Busch dominated, the main story of the day was that of the polesitter. Dale Jr.'s team had brought an overly aggressive shock package to Pocono, and it was not working for them as the car was tight despite numerous adjustments. Their struggles hit a low point when Earnhardt Jr. spun the car in turn three. The team changed the shock and Dale Jr. rallied back to second place. Despite this comeback, Busch had overtaken Earnhardt Jr. for the critical 12th position in points.

Jeff Gordon extended his points lead over Denny Hamlin to 366 points.

== Race results ==
Fin	St	#	Driver	Team	Make	Laps	Led	Status	Pts	Winnings
1	2	2	Kurt Busch	Penske Racing South	Dodge	200	175	running	195	$212,108
2	1	8	Dale Earnhardt Jr.	Dale Earnhardt, Inc.	Chevrolet	200	8	running	175	$218,708
3	6	11	Denny Hamlin	Joe Gibbs Racing	Chevrolet	200	0	running	165	$157,200
4	11	24	Jeff Gordon	Hendrick Motorsports	Chevrolet	200	0	running	160	$155,136
5	7	48	Jimmie Johnson	Hendrick Motorsports	Chevrolet	200	0	running	155	$148,936
6	24	20	Tony Stewart	Joe Gibbs Racing	Chevrolet	200	0	running	150	$136,361
7	4	12	Ryan Newman	Penske Racing South	Dodge	200	1	running	151	$127,350
8	15	07	Clint Bowyer	Richard Childress Racing	Chevrolet	200	1	running	147	$88,925
9	25	01	Mark Martin	Dale Earnhardt, Inc.	Chevrolet	200	0	running	138	$87,325
10	8	25	Casey Mears	Hendrick Motorsports	Chevrolet	200	0	running	134	$94,475
11	18	31	Jeff Burton	Richard Childress Racing	Chevrolet	200	0	running	130	$111,391
12	3	5	Kyle Busch	Hendrick Motorsports	Chevrolet	200	2	running	132	$87,650
13	20	88	Ricky Rudd	Robert Yates Racing	Ford	200	0	running	124	$104,533
14	37	17	Matt Kenseth	Roush Fenway Racing	Ford	200	1	running	126	$122,191
15	17	96	Tony Raines	Hall of Fame Racing	Chevrolet	200	0	running	118	$81,100
16	9	42	Juan Pablo Montoya	Chip Ganassi Racing with Felix Sabates	Dodge	200	0	running	115	$106,425
17	23	29	Kevin Harvick	Richard Childress Racing	Chevrolet	200	0	running	112	$114,186
18	21	21	Bill Elliott	Wood Brothers Racing	Ford	200	1	running	114	$89,214
19	32	66	Jeff Green	Haas CNC Racing	Chevrolet	200	4	running	111	$94,958
20	19	22	Dave Blaney	Bill Davis Racing	Toyota	200	0	running	103	$95,483
21	29	99	Carl Edwards	Roush Fenway Racing	Ford	200	0	running	100	$76,625
22	13	1	Martin Truex Jr.	Dale Earnhardt, Inc.	Chevrolet	200	1	running	102	$94,170
23	12	16	Greg Biffle	Roush Fenway Racing	Ford	200	0	running	94	$83,375
24	16	10	Scott Riggs	Evernham Motorsports	Dodge	200	0	running	91	$75,350
25	34	40	David Stremme	Chip Ganassi Racing with Felix Sabates	Dodge	200	0	running	88	$67,525
26	35	15	Paul Menard	Dale Earnhardt, Inc.	Chevrolet	200	0	running	85	$66,775
27	5	9	Kasey Kahne	Evernham Motorsports	Dodge	200	0	running	82	$110,616
28	10	41	Reed Sorenson	Chip Ganassi Racing with Felix Sabates	Dodge	200	5	running	84	$88,533
29	28	83	Brian Vickers	Red Bull Racing Team	Toyota	200	0	running	76	$66,125
30	26	43	Bobby Labonte	Petty Enterprises	Dodge	199	1	running	78	$103,411
31	43	36	Jeremy Mayfield	Bill Davis Racing	Toyota	199	0	running	70	$62,825
32	14	19	Elliott Sadler	Evernham Motorsports	Dodge	198	0	running	67	$83,520
33	36	6	David Ragan	Roush Fenway Racing	Ford	198	0	running	64	$99,550
34	42	45	Kyle Petty	Petty Enterprises	Dodge	198	0	running	61	$73,933
35	27	18	J.J. Yeley	Joe Gibbs Racing	Chevrolet	198	0	running	58	$90,033
36	41	70	Johnny Sauter	Haas CNC Racing	Chevrolet	198	0	running	55	$61,900
37	30	7	P. J. Jones	Robby Gordon Motorsports	Ford	198	0	running	52	$61,725
38	39	55	Michael Waltrip	Michael Waltrip Racing	Toyota	194	0	fuel pump	49	$71,147
39	33	38	David Gilliland	Robert Yates Racing	Ford	192	0	running	46	$88,689
40	22	26	Jamie McMurray	Roush Fenway Racing	Ford	177	0	crash	43	$69,325
41	31	00	David Reutimann	Michael Waltrip Racing	Toyota	159	0	fuel pump	40	$61,180
42	40	44	Dale Jarrett	Michael Waltrip Racing	Toyota	151	0	fuel pump	37	$61,030
43	38	4	Ward Burton	Morgan–McClure Motorsports	Chevrolet	109	0	engine	34	$61,197
Failed to qualify
44		49	Mike Bliss	BAM Racing	Dodge					
45		84	A.J. Allmendinger	Red Bull Racing Team	Toyota					
46		37	Kevin Lepage	Front Row Motorsports	Dodge					
47		78	Kenny Wallace	Furniture Row Racing	Chevrolet					

== Notes ==
- Kurt Busch has led a track record 175 laps.
- Kurt's track record for most laps led can't be broken because in 2012 Pocono revised the distances of their races down from 500 to 400 miles. Making the distances of the events only 160 laps. In 2020, when Pocono started the doubleheader weekend, the Saturday Cup event was revised down to 325 miles/130 laps, and the Sunday Cup event was revised down to 350 miles/140 laps.

Previous race: 2007 Allstate 400 at the Brickyard	Nextel Cup Series; 2007 season	Next race: 2007 Centurion Boats at the Glen
