= 2008 Coca-Cola 600 =

Race details
- Race 12 of 36 in the 2008 NASCAR Sprint Cup Series
- 2008 Coca-Cola 600 program cover, made by NASCAR artist Sam Bass. The painting is named "Classic!"
- Date: May 25, 2008
- Official name: Coca-Cola 600
- Location: Lowe's Motor Speedway, Concord, North Carolina
- Course: Permanent racing facility
- Course length: 1.5 miles (2.414 km)
- Distance: 400 laps, 600 mi (965.606 km)
- Weather: Warm with temperatures approaching 79 °F (26 °C); wind speeds up to 7 miles per hour (11 km/h)
- Average speed: 135.772 miles per hour (218.504 km/h)
- Attendance: 160,000

Pole position
Driver	Kyle Busch	Joe Gibbs Racing
- Time: 29.121

Most laps led
Driver	Dale Earnhardt Jr.	Hendrick Motorsports
- Laps: 76

Winner
No. 9	Kasey Kahne	Gillett Evernham Motorsports

Television in the United States
- Network: Fox Broadcasting Company
- Announcers: Mike Joy, Darrell Waltrip and Larry McReynolds

Radio in the United States
- Radio: Performance Racing Network

The 2008 Coca-Cola 600, the 49th running of the event, was a NASCAR stock car race held on May 25, 2008, at Lowe's Motor Speedway in Concord, North Carolina. The race was the twelfth stock car race of the 2008 NASCAR Sprint Cup season. The 400-lap race was won by Kasey Kahne of the Gillett Evernham Motorsports team, who started from the 2nd position. Greg Biffle finished second and Kyle Busch came in third.

== Background ==
Lowe's Motor Speedway, the track where the race was held.

The Coca-Cola 600 was the twelfth scheduled stock car race of the 2008 NASCAR Sprint Cup Series, out of 36, and the 49th iteration of the event. It was held on May 25, 2008, at Lowe's Motor Speedway in Concord, North Carolina. Lowe's Motor Speedway is a motorsports complex located thirteen miles from Charlotte, North Carolina in Concord, North Carolina. The complex features a 1.5 miles (2.4 km) quad-oval track that hosts NASCAR racing including the prestigious Coca-Cola 600 on Memorial Day weekend, the Nextel All-Star Challenge, and the Bank of America 500. The speedway was built in 1959 by Bruton Smith and is considered the home track for NASCAR. The track is owned and operated by Speedway Motorsports Inc. (SMI). Following the 2008 Coca-Cola 600, Humpy Wheeler retired as track president.

== Entry list ==
Car	Driver	Make	Team
00	Michael McDowell	Toyota	Michael Waltrip Racing
01	Regan Smith	Chevrolet	Dale Earnhardt, Inc.
1	Martin Truex Jr	Chevrolet	Dale Earnhardt, Inc.
2	Kurt Busch	Dodge	Penske Racing
5	Casey Mears	Chevrolet	Hendrick Motorsports
6	David Ragan	Ford	Roush Fenway Racing
07	Clint Bowyer	Chevrolet	Richard Childress Racing
7	Robby Gordon	Dodge	Robby Gordon Motorsports
08	Tony Raines	Dodge	E&M Motorsports
8	Mark Martin	Chevrolet	Dale Earnhardt, Inc.
9	Kasey Kahne	Dodge	Evernham Motorsports
10	Patrick Carpentier	Dodge	Evernham Motorsports
11	Denny Hamlin	Toyota	Joe Gibbs Racing
12	Ryan Newman	Dodge	Penske Racing
15	Paul Menard	Chevrolet	Dale Earnhardt, Inc.
16	Greg Biffle	Ford	Roush Fenway Racing
17	Matt Kenseth	Ford	Roush Fenway Racing
18	Kyle Busch	Toyota	Joe Gibbs Racing
19	Elliott Sadler	Dodge	Evernham Motorsports
20	Tony Stewart	Toyota	Joe Gibbs Racing
21	Jon Wood	Ford	Wood Brothers Racing
22	Dave Blaney	Toyota	Bill Davis Racing
24	Jeff Gordon	Chevrolet	Hendrick Motorsports
26	Jamie McMurray	Ford	Roush Fenway Racing
28	Travis Kvapil	Ford	Yates Racing
29	Kevin Harvick	Chevrolet	Richard Childress Racing
31	Jeff Burton	Chevrolet	Richard Childress Racing
33	Ken Schrader	Chevrolet	Richard Childress Racing
34	Jeff Green	Chevrolet	Front Row Motorsports
38	David Gilliland	Ford	Yates Racing
40	Sterling Marlin	Dodge	Chip Ganassi Racing
41	Reed Sorenson	Dodge	Chip Ganassi Racing
42	Juan Pablo Montoya	Dodge	Chip Ganassi Racing
43	Bobby Labonte	Dodge	Petty Enterprises
44	David Reutimann	Toyota	Michael Waltrip Racing
45	Kyle Petty	Dodge	Petty Enterprises
48	Jimmie Johnson	Chevrolet	Hendrick Motorsports
50	Stanton Barrett	Chevrolet	SKI Motorsports
55	Michael Waltrip	Toyota	Michael Waltrip Racing
66	Scott Riggs	Chevrolet	Haas CNC Racing
70	Johnny Sauter	Chevrolet	Haas CNC Racing
77	Sam Hornish Jr	Dodge	Penske Racing
78	Joe Nemechek	Chevrolet	Furniture Row Racing
83	Brian Vickers	Toyota	Red Bull Racing Team
84	AJ Allmendinger	Toyota	Red Bull Racing Team
88	Dale Earnhardt Jr	Chevrolet	Hendrick Motorsports
96	JJ Yeley	Toyota	Hall of Fame Racing
99	Carl Edwards	Ford	Roush Fenway Racing

== Qualifying ==
There were a total of three practice sessions prior to the race. During the first session on Thursday, May 22, 2008, David Ragan had the fastest speed at 181.622 mph. Before Saturday's first practice session, both Haas CNC Racing cars - the No. 66 of Scott Riggs and the No. 70 Johnny Sauter - were impounded by NASCAR officials and taken to the research and development center for illegal wing adjustments. As a result, they were forced to drive backup cars and start at the rear of the starting lineup. Both teams were also charged a US $100,000 fine in addition to having their crew chiefs suspended for the next six races starting at Dover and running through Daytona.

The second practice session took place on Saturday, May 24, 2008, with Greg Biffle taking the top position with a speed of 180.282 mph. Brian Vickers had the fastest practice speed at 180.735 mph during the third and final practice session on Saturday. Kyle Busch won the Coors Light Pole, currently known as the Busch Pole Award, with a speed of 185.433 mph for his second pole of 2008 and the fourth of his career. He began on P-1 with Sprint All-Star Race XXIV champion Kasey Kahne next to him filling out the front row.

Pos	No.	Driver	Manufacturer	Time	Speed
1	18	Kyle Busch	Toyota	29.121	185.433
2	9	Kasey Kahne	Dodge	29.142	185.300
3	83	Brian Vickers	Toyota	29.150	185.249
4	16	Greg Biffle	Ford	29.194	184.969
5	6	David Ragan	Ford	29.273	184.470
6	88	Dale Earnhardt Jr	Chevrolet	29.278	184.439
7	8	Mark Martin	Chevrolet	29.319	184.181
8	2	Kurt Busch	Dodge	29.331	184.106
9	19	Elliott Sadler	Dodge	29.352	183.974
10	48	Jimmie Johnson	Chevrolet	29.360	183.924
11	22	Dave Blaney	Toyota	29.373	183.842
12	17	Matt Kenseth	Ford	29.383	183.780
13	66	Scott Riggs	Chevrolet	29.400	183.673
14	31	Jeff Burton	Chevrolet	29.409	183.617
15	26	Jamie McMurray	Ford	29.415	183.580
16	11	Denny Hamlin	Toyota	29.435	183.455
17	41	Reed Sorenson	Dodge	29.437	183.443
18	24	Jeff Gordon	Chevrolet	29.438	183.436
19	29	Kevin Harvick	Chevrolet	29.439	183.430
20	77	Sam Hornish Jr	Dodge	29.452	183.349
21	5	Casey Mears	Chevrolet	29.464	183.275
22	7	Robby Gordon	Dodge	29.474	183.212
23	43	Bobby Labonte	Dodge	29.476	183.200
24	1	Martin Truex Jr	Chevrolet	29.481	183.169
25	15	Paul Menard	Chevrolet	29.487	183.132
26	40	Sterling Marlin	Dodge	29.499	183.057
27	84	AJ Allmendinger	Toyota	29.532	182.852
28	44	David Reutimann	Toyota	29.552	182.729
29	55	Michael Waltrip	Toyota	29.558	182.692
30	99	Carl Edwards	Ford	29.643	182.168
31	20	Tony Stewart	Toyota	29.652	182.113
32	38	David Gilliland	Ford	29.667	182.020
33	33	Ken Schrader	Chevrolet	29.673	181.984
34	10	Patrick Carpentier	Dodge	29.692	181.867
35	96	JJ Yeley	Toyota	29.715	181.726
36	45	Kyle Petty	Dodge	29.717	181.714
37	01	Regan Smith	Chevrolet	29.719	181.702
38	12	Ryan Newman	Dodge	29.747	181.531
39	07	Clint Bowyer	Chevrolet	29.755	181.482
40	00	Michael McDowell	Toyota	29.758	181.464
41	28	Travis Kvapil	Ford	29.974	180.156
42	42	Juan Montoya	Dodge	30.080	179.521
43	70	Johnny Sauter	Chevrolet	29.761	181.446
Failed to qualify
44	34	Jeff Green	Chevrolet	29.774	181.366
45	50	Stanton Barrett	Chevrolet	29.982	180.108
46	21	Jon Wood	Ford	29.991	180.054
47	78	Joe Nemechek	Chevrolet	30.061	179.635
48	08	Tony Raines	Dodge	30.739	175.673

Failed to Qualify: Jeff Green (No. 34), Stanton Barrett (No. 50), Jon Wood (No. 21), Joe Nemechek (No. 78) and Tony Raines (No. 08).

== Race recap ==
The 2008 Coca-Cola 600 began with a scheduled green flag at 5:45 p.m. EST. The race award was set at approximately $6,648,557. The Car of Tomorrow had a successful race following its initial introduction at the 2007 Food City 500, and a record number of green flag passes was set with the average green flag run lasting 29.2 laps. Kyle Busch led for the first 33 laps and lost his lead to Brian Vickers until a cut tire sent Vickers into the turn 4 wall while leading the field by an entire backstretch. Kasey Kahne, Jimmie Johnson, Tony Stewart, and Busch then traded the lead amongst themselves several times after Vickers fell out of contention. Kurt Busch held the longest lead of the race from laps 67 to 119 which totaled to 53 laps led in one consecutive run. Dale Earnhardt Jr. maintained the most laps led throughout at 76 laps. There was a total of 39 lead changes during the race with 16 different drivers leading a lap. Johnson, who was leading late in the race, fell out of the race after experiencing engine failure that caused him to finish 39th. Robby Gordon and Patrick Carpentier also had engine trouble, and Paul Menard was eliminated from the running due to his car overheating. Approximately 12.5% of the race was run under caution, including five turning related accidents and three cautions citing debris.

After pit stops cycled through with 10 laps to go, Tony Stewart led the 2nd place car of Kasey Kahne by a large margin. Stewart cut a tire while leading with 2 laps to go, putting the victory in the lap of Kahne. With his eighth career win, Kahne completed the Charlotte sweep by following up his 2008 Sprint All-Star Race win with a win in the 600. Kahne's margin of victory was 10.203 seconds. This was his first win in 2008—ending his 52 race winless drought. Greg Biffle finished 2nd, Busch finished 3rd, while Jeff Gordon and Earnhardt Jr. rounded out the Top 5. The total race time was 4:25:09.

Live television coverage of the 2008 Coca-Cola 600 began at 6:30 p.m. EDT in the United States on Fox. Radio coverage was handled by Sirius Satellite Radio and the Speedway Motorsports, Inc.-owned Performance Racing Network on terrestrial radio stations.

== Race results ==
Fin	St	#	Driver	Make	Team	Laps	Led	Status	Pts
1	2	9	Kasey Kahne	Dodge	Evernham Motorsports	400	66	running	190
2	4	16	Greg Biffle	Ford	Roush Fenway Racing	400	2	running	175
3	1	18	Kyle Busch	Toyota	Joe Gibbs Racing	400	61	running	170
4	18	24	Jeff Gordon	Chevy	Hendrick Motorsports	400	0	running	160
5	6	88	Dale Earnhardt Jr.	Chevy	Hendrick Motorsports	400	76	running	165
6	14	31	Jeff Burton	Chevy	Richard Childress Racing	400	1	running	155
7	12	17	Matt Kenseth	Ford	Roush Fenway Racing	400	1	running	151
8	9	19	Elliott Sadler	Dodge	Evernham Motorsports	400	3	running	147
9	30	99	Carl Edwards	Ford	Roush Fenway Racing	400	0	running	138
10	28	44	David Reutimann	Toyota	Michael Waltrip Racing	400	0	running	134
11	23	43	Bobby Labonte	Dodge	Petty Enterprises	400	0	running	130
12	5	6	David Ragan	Ford	Roush Fenway Racing	400	2	running	132
13	20	77	Sam Hornish Jr.	Dodge	Penske Racing	400	0	running	124
14	19	29	Kevin Harvick	Chevy	Richard Childress Racing	400	0	running	121
15	7	8	Mark Martin	Chevy	Dale Earnhardt, Inc.	400	0	running	118
16	8	2	Kurt Busch	Dodge	Penske Racing	400	64	running	120
17	11	22	Dave Blaney	Toyota	Bill Davis Racing	400	2	running	117
18	31	20	Tony Stewart	Toyota	Joe Gibbs Racing	399	23	running	114
19	37	01	Regan Smith	Chevy	Dale Earnhardt, Inc.	399	0	running	106
20	27	84	A.J. Allmendinger	Toyota	Red Bull Racing Team	399	0	running	103
21	38	12	Ryan Newman	Dodge	Penske Racing	399	1	running	105
22	17	41	Reed Sorenson	Dodge	Chip Ganassi Racing	399	0	running	97
23	15	26	Jamie McMurray	Ford	Roush Fenway Racing	399	0	running	94
24	16	11	Denny Hamlin	Toyota	Joe Gibbs Racing	399	1	running	96
25	39	07	Clint Bowyer	Chevy	Richard Childress Racing	398	0	running	88
26	41	28	Travis Kvapil	Ford	Yates Racing	398	0	running	85
27	29	55	Michael Waltrip	Toyota	Michael Waltrip Racing	397	0	running	82
28	13	66	Scott Riggs	Chevy	Haas CNC Racing	397	0	running	-71
29	21	5	Casey Mears	Chevy	Hendrick Motorsports	396	1	running	81
30	42	42	Juan Pablo Montoya	Dodge	Chip Ganassi Racing	396	0	running	73
31	26	40	Sterling Marlin	Dodge	Chip Ganassi Racing	396	0	running	70
32	40	00	Michael McDowell	Toyota	Michael Waltrip Racing	395	0	running	67
33	33	33	Ken Schrader	Chevy	Richard Childress Racing	395	0	running	64
34	24	1	Martin Truex Jr.	Chevy	Dale Earnhardt, Inc.	395	0	running	61
35	43	70	Johnny Sauter	Chevy	Haas CNC Racing	395	0	running	-92
36	36	45	Kyle Petty	Dodge	Petty Enterprises	389	0	running	55
37	34	10	Patrick Carpentier	Dodge	Evernham Motorsports	363	0	engine	52
38	35	96	J.J. Yeley	Toyota	Hall of Fame Racing	353	0	running	49
39	10	48	Jimmie Johnson	Chevy	Hendrick Motorsports	351	35	engine	51
40	32	38	David Gilliland	Ford	Yates Racing	343	0	running	43
41	25	15	Paul Menard	Chevy	Dale Earnhardt, Inc.	244	0	overheating	40
42	3	83	Brian Vickers	Toyota	Red Bull Racing Team	184	61	crash	42
43	22	7	Robby Gordon	Dodge	Robby Gordon Motorsports	181	0	engine	34

== Post-race standings ==
Rank	Driver	Points
1	Kyle Busch	1860
2	Jeff Burton	1766 (–94)
3	Dale Earnhardt Jr.	1721 (–139)
4	Denny Hamlin	1596 (–264)
5	Clint Bowyer	1578 (–282)
6	Carl Edwards	1538 (–322)
7	Kevin Harvick	1517 (–343)
8	Tony Stewart	1511 (–349)
9	Jimmie Johnson	1493 (–367)
10	Jeff Gordon	1486 (–374)
11	Greg Biffle	1483 (–377)
12	Kasey Kahne	1454 (–406)
13	David Ragan	1398 (–462)
14	Ryan Newman	1369 (–491)
15	Martin Truex Jr.	1291 (–569)
16	Matt Kenseth	1264 (–596)
17	Juan Pablo Montoya	1263 (–597)
18	Bobby Labonte	1258 (–602)
19	Travis Kvapil	1240 (–620)
20	Brian Vickers	1203 (–657)

Previous race: 2008 Dodge Challenger 500	Sprint Cup Series; 2008 season	Next race: 2008 Best Buy 400
