= 2008 LifeLock 400 =

2008 Lifelock 400
Race details
- Race 15 of 36 in the 2008 NASCAR Sprint Cup Series season
- 2008 LifeLock 400 program cover
- Date: June 15, 2008
- Official name: Lifelock 400
- Location: Michigan International Speedway, Brooklyn, Michigan
- Course: Permanent racing facility
- Course length: 2.0 miles (3.218 km)
- Distance: 203 laps, 406 mi (653.393 km)
- Scheduled distance: 200 laps, 400 mi (643.737 km)
- Weather: Temperatures up to 81 °F (27 °C); wind speeds reaching 12 miles per hour (19 km/h)
- Average speed: 145.375 miles per hour (233.958 km/h)

Pole position
Driver	Kyle Busch	Joe Gibbs Racing
- Time: 2008 Owner's Points

Most laps led
Driver	Jimmie Johnson	Hendrick Motorsports
- Laps: 65

Winner
No. 88	Dale Earnhardt Jr.	Hendrick Motorsports

Television in the United States
- Network: TNT
- Announcers: Bill Weber, Kyle Petty and Wally Dallenbach Jr.

The 2008 LifeLock 400 was the fifteenth points race in the 2008 NASCAR Sprint Cup schedule. Held on Sunday, June 15 at Michigan International Speedway in Brooklyn, Michigan, it was the first of two races sponsored by the internet protection service LifeLock, the other being the LifeLock.com 400 at Chicagoland Speedway on July 12.

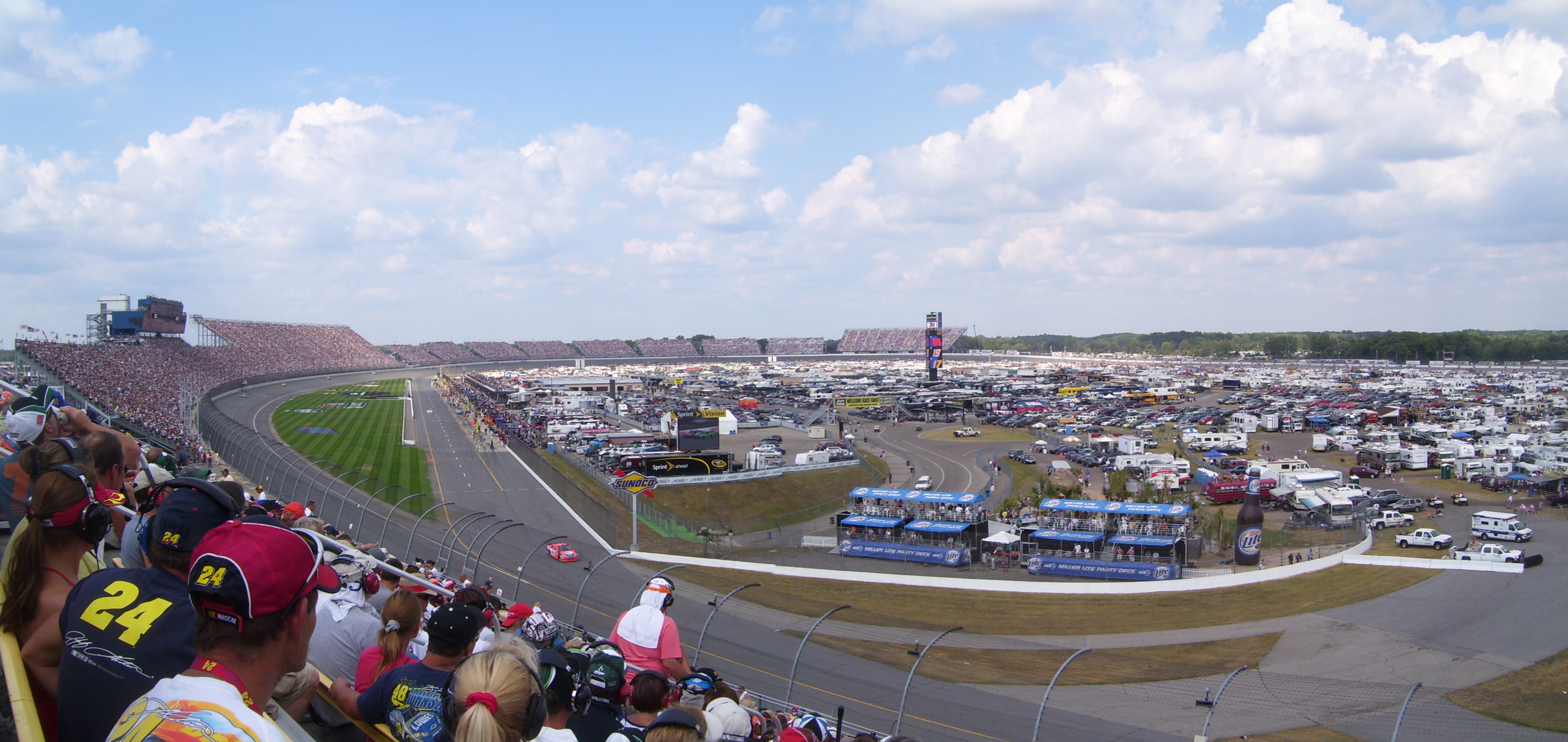
View of Michigan International Speedway; circa 2008

Eleven cars set times before rain set in and cancelled qualifying, so the field was set by the rule book with points leader Kyle Busch on pole, Jeff Burton second and Dale Earnhardt Jr. third. Jason Leffler (#70) and Tony Raines (#34) did not start because qualifying was cancelled due to rain. Kenny Wallace and the #87 car, and the #08 car, without a driver, were both withdrawn earlier in the week.

== Race recap ==
In a mixture of luck, fuel economy, and strategy, Dale Earnhardt Jr. scored his first win in 76 points races thanks to a late caution due to Sam Hornish Jr.'s late-race crash, and a green-white-checker finish with Patrick Carpentier and Michael Waltrip crashing near the start/finish line to end the race. Instead of completing a victory lap, or doing the traditional burnout, Earnhardt coasted on to pit road after he had run out of fuel.

== Results ==
POS	ST	#	DRIVER	SPONSOR / OWNER	CAR	LAPS	MONEY	STATUS	LED	PTS
1	3	88	Dale Earnhardt Jr.	National Guard / AMP Energy (Rick Hendrick)	Chevrolet	203	173550	running	14	190
2	9	9	Kasey Kahne	Budweiser / LifeLock (Gillett Evernham Motorsports)	Dodge	203	161116	running	0	170
3	16	17	Matt Kenseth	Carhartt (Jack Roush)	Ford	203	155066	running	41	170
4	18	83	Brian Vickers	Red Bull (Dietrich Mateschitz)	Toyota	203	97100	running	44	165
5	12	20	Tony Stewart	Home Depot (Joe Gibbs)	Toyota	203	136986	running	1	160
6	6	48	Jimmie Johnson	Lowe's (Rick Hendrick)	Chevrolet	203	149061	running	65	160
7	4	99	Carl Edwards	Office Depot (Jack Roush)	Ford	203	130200	running	21	151
8	13	6	David Ragan	AAA Insurance (Jack Roush)	Ford	203	98975	running	6	147
9	27	19	Elliott Sadler	McDonald's Big Mac (Gillett Evernham Motorsports)	Dodge	203	112120	running	0	138
10	23	26	Jamie McMurray	Crown Royal Cask No. 16 (Jack Roush)	Ford	203	95125	running	1	139
11	26	15	Paul Menard	Menards / Sylvania (Dale Earnhardt, Inc.)	Chevrolet	203	91875	running	0	130
12	10	29	Kevin Harvick	Shell / Pennzoil (Richard Childress)	Chevrolet	203	124786	running	0	127
13	1	18	Kyle Busch	M&M's (Joe Gibbs)	Toyota	203	101800	running	5	129
14	5	11	Denny Hamlin	FedEx Freight (Joe Gibbs)	Toyota	203	115841	running	1	126
15	2	31	Jeff Burton	AT&T Mobility (Richard Childress)	Chevrolet	203	123008	running	0	118
16	19	28	Travis Kvapil	FreeCreditReport.com (Yates Racing)	Ford	203	107314	running	0	115
17	17	1	Martin Truex Jr.	Bass Pro Shops / Tracker Boats (Dale Earnhardt, Inc.)	Chevrolet	203	110383	running	0	112
18	8	24	Jeff Gordon	DuPont (Rick Hendrick)	Chevrolet	203	124286	running	0	109
19	39	84	A.J. Allmendinger	Red Bull (Dietrich Mateschitz)	Toyota	203	78650	running	1	111
20	7	16	Greg Biffle	Dish Network / Dish DVRs (Jack Roush)	Ford	203	88875	running	0	103
21	22	2	Kurt Busch	Miller Lite (Roger Penske)	Dodge	203	82850	running	0	100
22	35	77	Sam Hornish Jr.	Mobil 1 (Roger Penske)	Dodge	203	121325	running	2	102
23	38	55	Michael Waltrip	NAPA Auto Parts (Michael Waltrip)	Toyota	203	96408	running	1	99
24	43	10	Patrick Carpentier	LifeLock (Gillett Evernham Motorsports)	Dodge	202	78800	crash	0	91
25	15	8	Mark Martin	U.S. Army (Dale Earnhardt, Inc.)	Chevrolet	202	110933	out of fuel	0	88
26	11	07	Clint Bowyer	Jack Daniel's (Richard Childress)	Chevrolet	202	91825	running	0	85
27	24	38	David Gilliland	FreeCreditReport.com (Yates Racing)	Ford	202	92383	running	0	82
28	42	78	Joe Nemechek	Furniture Row / Denver Mattress (Barney Visser)	Chevrolet	202	72975	running	0	79
29	36	45	Terry Labonte	Marathon American Spirit Motor Oil (Petty Enterprises)	Dodge	202	89933	running	0	76
30	25	5	Casey Mears	Kellogg's / Carquest (Rick Hendrick)	Chevrolet	201	91200	running	0	73
31	20	43	Bobby Labonte	Marathon American Spirit Motor Oil (Petty Enterprises)	Dodge	201	112486	running	0	70
32	31	01	Regan Smith	Principal Financial Group (Dale Earnhardt, Inc.)	Chevrolet	201	82950	running	0	67
33	34	66	Scott Riggs	State Water Heaters (Gene Haas)	Chevrolet	201	84983	running	0	64
34	32	41	Reed Sorenson	Target (Chip Ganassi)	Dodge	200	99489	running	0	61
35	28	44	David Reutimann	UPS (Michael Waltrip)	Toyota	200	72125	running	0	58
36	37	21	Bill Elliott	Motorcraft (Wood Brothers)	Ford	200	90420	running	0	55
37	33	00	Michael McDowell	Champion Mortgage (Michael Waltrip)	Toyota	199	81572	running	0	52
38	21	42	Juan Pablo Montoya	Big Red Slim Pack (Chip Ganassi)	Dodge	194	99848	running	0	49
39	29	22	Dave Blaney	Caterpillar (Bill Davis)	Toyota	180	71890	running	0	46
40	30	7	Robby Gordon	RVs.com / Camping World (Robby Gordon)	Dodge	150	79850	crash	0	43
41	40	96	J.J. Yeley	DLP HDTV (Jeff Moorad)	Toyota	116	79815	engine	0	40
42	14	12	Ryan Newman	Alltel (Roger Penske)	Dodge	114	113845	engine	0	37
43	41	40	Dario Franchitti	Juicy Fruit Slim Pack (Chip Ganassi)	Dodge	30	79258	engine	0	34
Failed to qualify
POS	NAME	NBR	SPONSOR	OWNER	CAR					
44	Jason Leffler	70	Haas Automation	Gene Haas	Chevrolet					
45	Tony Raines	34	Front Row Motorsports	Bob Jenkins	Chevrolet					

Previous race: 2008 Pocono 500	Sprint Cup Series; 2008 season	Next race: 2008 Toyota/Save Mart 350
