= 2008 Pocono 500 =

Race details
- Race 14 of 36 in the 2008 NASCAR Sprint Cup Series season
- 2008 Pocono 500 program cover
- Date: June 8, 2008
- Official name: Pocono 500
- Location: Pocono Raceway, Long Pond, Pennsylvania
- Course: Permanent racing facility
- Course length: 2.5 miles (4.023 km)
- Distance: 200 laps, 500 mi (804.672 km)
- Weather: Temperatures reaching up to 91.9 °F (33.3 °C); average wind speeds of 20 miles per hour (32 km/h)
- Average speed: 125.209 miles per hour (201.504 km/h)

Pole position
Driver	Kasey Kahne	Gillett Evernham Motorsports
- Time: 52.873

Most laps led
Driver	Kasey Kahne	Gillett Evernham Motorsports
- Laps: 69

Winner
No. 9	Kasey Kahne	Gillett Evernham Motorsports

Television in the United States
- Network: TNT
- Announcers: Bill Weber, Kyle Petty and Wally Dallenbach Jr.

The 2008 Pocono 500 was the fourteenth race of the 2008 NASCAR Sprint Cup schedule and was run on Sunday, June 8 at Pocono Raceway in Long Pond, Pennsylvania. The race was the first NASCAR telecast on TNT for the 2008 season starting at 12:30 PM EDT and on radio via MRN and Sirius Satellite Radio at 1:15 PM US EDT.

== Pre-race news ==
- Terry Labonte would fill in for Kyle Petty in the #45 Petty Enterprises Dodge for six races as Petty moves upstairs to the broadcast booth.
- Dario Franchitti returns to the #40 Chip Ganassi Racing Dodge following his injury several weeks ago.

== Qualifying ==
Jimmie Johnson started out on the pole position, but almost an hour later, Kasey Kahne bumped him. Dale Earnhardt, Inc. teammates Mark Martin and Regan Smith made up the second row, while Joe Nemechek and Carl Edwards made up their third row.

RANK	DRIVER	NBR	CAR	TIME	SPEED	
1	Kasey Kahne	9	Dodge	52.873	170.219	
2	Jimmie Johnson	48	Chevrolet	52.986	169.856	
3	Mark Martin	8	Chevrolet	53.287	168.897	
4	Regan Smith	01	Chevrolet	53.335	168.745	
5	Joe Nemechek	78	Chevrolet	53.342	168.723	*
6	Carl Edwards	99	Ford	53.407	168.517	
7	Dale Earnhardt Jr.	88	Chevrolet	53.411	168.505	
8	A. J. Allmendinger	84	Toyota	53.419	168.479	*
9	Scott Riggs	66	Chevrolet	53.447	168.391	*
10	Kyle Busch	18	Toyota	53.527	168.139	
11	Kurt Busch	2	Dodge	53.532	168.124	
12	Tony Stewart	20	Toyota	53.554	168.055	
13	Matt Kenseth	17	Ford	53.581	167.970	
14	Dario Franchitti	40	Dodge	53.591	167.939	*
15	Brian Vickers	83	Toyota	53.602	167.904	
16	Denny Hamlin	11	Toyota	53.605	167.895	
17	Paul Menard	15	Chevrolet	53.623	167.838	
18	Elliott Sadler	19	Dodge	53.640	167.785	
19	Michael Waltrip	55	Toyota	53.655	167.738	
20	Jeff Burton	31	Chevrolet	53.656	167.735	
21	Juan Pablo Montoya	42	Dodge	53.742	167.467	
22	Jamie McMurray	26	Ford	53.752	167.436	
23	Travis Kvapil	28	Ford	53.774	167.367	
24	Patrick Carpentier	10	Dodge	53.781	167.345	*
25	Martin Truex Jr.	1	Chevrolet	53.787	167.327	
26	Jason Leffler	70	Chevrolet	53.809	167.258	*
27	Ryan Newman	12	Dodge	53.810	167.255	
28	Kevin Harvick	29	Chevrolet	53.883	167.029	
29	Bill Elliott	21	Ford	53.970	166.759	*
30	David Ragan	6	Ford	53.986	166.710	
31	Reed Sorenson	41	Dodge	53.993	166.688	
32	Dave Blaney	22	Toyota	54.006	166.648	
33	Greg Biffle	16	Ford	54.007	166.645	
34	Casey Mears	5	Chevrolet	54.020	166.605	
35	Clint Bowyer	07	Chevrolet	54.024	166.593	
36	David Reutimann	44	Toyota	54.025	166.590	
37	Bobby Labonte	43	Dodge	54.032	166.568	
38	Jeff Gordon	24	Chevrolet	54.069	166.454	
39	J. J. Yeley	96	Toyota	54.103	166.349	*
40	Michael McDowell	00	Toyota	54.127	166.276	
41	Terry Labonte	45	Dodge	54.127	166.276	PC
42	Robby Gordon	7	Dodge	54.259	165.871	
43	Sam Hornish Jr.	77	Dodge	54.522	165.071	OP
44	David Gilliland	38	Ford	54.555	164.971	OP

OP: qualified via owners points

PC: qualified as past champion

PR: provisional

QR: via qualifying race

* - had to qualify on time

Failed to qualify, withdrew, or driver changes: J.J. Yeley (#96), Kenny Wallace (#87-WD)

== Happy Hour ==
It was anything but happy for points leader Kyle Busch, attempting to race all three series in three days in three sites. His primary car crashed and will be forced to a back-up car and start from the rear as a result. Also going to the back of the field was Sam Hornish Jr. for the same reason. Carl Edwards ran the fastest lap of the session at 164.769 mph. Eventual race winner Kasey Kahne ran the second lap of the session, which was 0.6 seconds slower than Edwards lap.

== Race ==
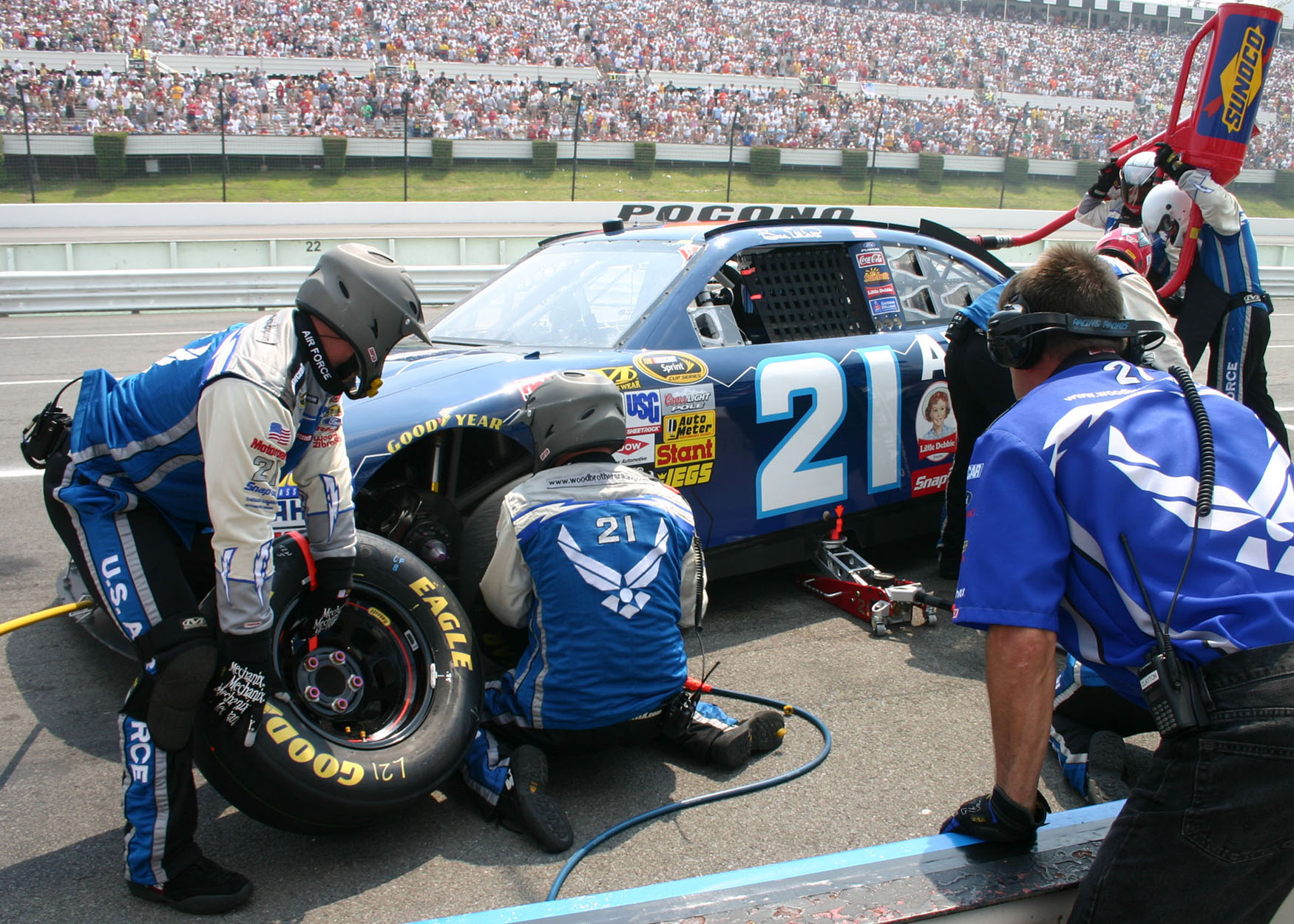
Car #21 pitting during the race

=== Information ===
- Elapsed Time: 3:59:36
- Average Speed: 125.209 mph
- Margin of Victory: 3.702 sec
- Cautions: 10 for 38 laps
- Lead Changes: 23
- Leaders: 12

The woes of the #18 team continued into the race, when Kyle Busch crashed into the wall early into the race, and had to replace the nose, finishing dead last in the 43-car field, changing a 142-point lead to a 21-point lead to Jeff Burton. Greg Biffle suffered a pit road speeding penalty late in the race under green, causing him to lose the race. Carl Edwards looked to be a favorite to win the race in the closing laps, but a flat tire under a caution with about 20 laps to go destroyed his chances, as there were 33 cars on the lead lap. As the green flag came out, polesitter Kasey Kahne took the lead with 15 laps remaining from Brian Vickers in the Team Red Bull #83 Toyota and won his second points race of the season within the last three weeks.

== Results ==
POS	ST	#	DRIVER	OWNER	CAR	LAPS	STATUS	LED	PTS
1	1	9	Kasey Kahne	Gillett Evernham Motorsports	Dodge	200	running	69	195
2	15	83	Brian Vickers	Dietrich Mateschitz	Toyota	200	running	18	175
3	16	11	Denny Hamlin	Joe Gibbs	Toyota	200	running	17	170
4	7	88	Dale Earnhardt Jr.	Rick Hendrick	Chevrolet	200	running	0	160
5	20	31	Jeff Burton	Richard Childress	Chevrolet	200	running	0	155
6	2	48	Jimmie Johnson	Rick Hendrick	Chevrolet	200	running	59	155
7	13	17	Matt Kenseth	Jack Roush	Ford	200	running	2	151
8	11	2	Kurt Busch	Roger Penske	Dodge	200	running	0	142
9	6	99	Carl Edwards	Jack Roush	Ford	200	running	2	143
10	3	8	Mark Martin	Dale Earnhardt, Inc.	Chevrolet	200	running	0	134
11	37	43	Bobby Labonte	Petty Enterprises	Dodge	200	running	0	130
12	8	84	A. J. Allmendinger	Dietrich Mateschitz	Toyota	200	running	0	127
13	28	29	Kevin Harvick	Richard Childress	Chevrolet	200	running	0	124
14	38	24	Jeff Gordon	Rick Hendrick	Chevrolet	200	running	0	121
15	33	16	Greg Biffle	Jack Roush	Ford	200	running	4	123
16	42	38	David Gilliland	Yates Racing	Ford	200	running	0	115
17	25	1	Martin Truex Jr.	Dale Earnhardt, Inc.	Chevrolet	200	running	2	117
18	27	12	Ryan Newman	Roger Penske	Dodge	200	running	0	109
19	36	44	David Reutimann	Michael Waltrip	Toyota	200	running	0	106
20	22	26	Jamie McMurray	Jack Roush	Ford	200	running	0	103
21	9	66	Scott Riggs	Gene Haas	Chevrolet	200	running	6	105
22	32	22	Dave Blaney	Bill Davis	Toyota	200	running	1	102
23	23	28	Travis Kvapil	Yates Racing	Ford	200	running	0	94
24	30	6	David Ragan	Jack Roush	Ford	200	running	0	91
25	17	15	Paul Menard	Dale Earnhardt, Inc.	Chevrolet	200	running	0	88
26	34	5	Casey Mears	Rick Hendrick	Chevrolet	200	running	0	85
27	39	00	Michael McDowell	Michael Waltrip	Toyota	200	running	0	82
28	4	01	Regan Smith	Dale Earnhardt, Inc.	Chevrolet	200	running	0	79
29	5	78	Joe Nemechek	Barney Visser	Chevrolet	200	running	0	76
30	43	45	Terry Labonte	Petty Enterprises	Dodge	200	running	0	73
31	29	21	Bill Elliott	Wood Brothers	Ford	200	running	0	70
32	24	10	Patrick Carpentier	Gillett Evernham Motorsports	Dodge	200	running	0	67
33	31	41	Reed Sorenson	Chip Ganassi	Dodge	200	running	0	64
34	18	19	Elliott Sadler	Gillett Evernham Motorsports	Dodge	200	running	6	66
35	12	20	Tony Stewart	Joe Gibbs	Toyota	199	running	14	63
36	40	7	Robby Gordon	Robby Gordon	Dodge	199	running	0	55
37	19	55	Michael Waltrip	Michael Waltrip	Toyota	199	running	0	52
38	21	42	Juan Pablo Montoya	Chip Ganassi	Dodge	157	crash	0	49
39	35	07	Clint Bowyer	Richard Childress	Chevrolet	155	running	0	46
40	26	70	Jason Leffler	Gene Haas	Chevrolet	140	crash	0	43
41	14	40	Dario Franchitti	Chip Ganassi	Dodge	137	crash	0	40
42	41	77	Sam Hornish Jr.	Roger Penske	Dodge	130	crash	0	37
43	10	18	Kyle Busch	Joe Gibbs	Toyota	95	crash	0	34
Failed to qualify, withdrew, or driver changes:
POS	NAME	NBR	OWNER	CAR					
44	J. J. Yeley	96	Jeff Moorad	Toyota					
WD	Kenny Wallace	87	Barney Visser	Chevrolet					

=== Incidents ===
- On lap 41, Kurt Busch would lose control of his car exiting turn 1, he slides into the grass and briefly becomes airborne due to the bumpiness of the infield. He would later recover with no significant damage and rally to an 8th-place finish.
- Points leader Kyle Busch would hit the frontstretch wall after unsuccessfully trying to change lanes on lap 48, causing Jamie McMurray to make contact with the left rear corner of his car. The incident causes significant body damage on the entire right side of his car.
- Patrick Carpentier and Sam Hornish Jr. make contact in turn 1 on lap 58, also collecting David Gilliland.
- On lap 82, Clint Bowyer loses control of his car exiting turn 3. Juan Pablo Montoya has nowhere to go, and ends up hitting Bowyer behind the driver's door on the left side of the car. Bowyer spins and eventually finds the pit road wall where his car comes to a stop. Montoya's car is on fire and he limps to the end of pit road where he exits the car. Bowyer later returns to finish the race 45 laps down, and Montoya parks his car after 157 laps.
- Michael Waltrip would hit the turn 1 outside retaining wall on lap 106.
- Dario Franchitti would spin in turn 3 on lap 123.
- Already nursing a damaged race car, Kyle Busch hits the curb in the famed tunnel turn causing him to spin during the cycle of the last green flag pit stops on lap 178. This spin would seal his 43rd-place finish in the event.

Previous race: 2008 Best Buy 400	Sprint Cup Series; 2008 season	Next race: 2008 LifeLock 400
