= 2007 Goody's Cool Orange 500 =

Race details
- Race 6 of 36 in the 2007 NASCAR Nextel Cup Series season
- The 2007 Goody's Cool Orange 500 program cover, celebrating the 60th anniversary since the track opened.
- Date: April 1, 2007
- Location: Martinsville Speedway, Ridgeway, Virginia
- Course: Permanent racing facility
- Course length: 0.526 miles (0.847 km)
- Distance: 500 laps, 263 mi (423.257 km)
- Average speed: 70.258 miles per hour (113.069 km/h)

Pole position
Driver	Denny Hamlin	Joe Gibbs Racing
- Time: 19.911

Most laps led
Driver	Dale Earnhardt Jr.	Dale Earnhardt, Inc.
- Laps: 137

Winner
No. 48	Jimmie Johnson	Hendrick Motorsports

Television in the United States
- Network: Fox Broadcasting Company
- Announcers: Mike Joy, Darrell Waltrip and Larry McReynolds

The 2007 Goody's Cool Orange 500 was the sixth race of the 2007 NASCAR Nextel Cup Series season. It was held on Sunday, April 1, 2007 at the 0.526 mile Martinsville Speedway in Martinsville, Virginia, the circuit's shortest (by distance) oval.

The event was the second to use NASCAR's Car of Tomorrow template, and the first in which the 2007 Top 35 teams (by owner points) were awarded exemptions.

The winner of the race was Jimmie Johnson of the Hendrick Motorsports team. His teammate, Jeff Gordon, placed second by less than a second after a battle between the two during the last laps of the race. Gordon attempted many times to take the lead from Johnson by passing on the inside, however Johnson held his position and managed to regain spacing ahead of Gordon on the straightaways.

== Race results ==
Fin	St	Driver	Car No.	Make	Points	Bonus	Laps	Winnings
1	20	Jimmie Johnson	48	Chevrolet	190	5	500	$198,736
2	3	Jeff Gordon	24	Chevrolet	175	5	500	$153,861
3	1	Denny Hamlin	11	Chevrolet	170	5	500	$139,125
4	14	Kyle Busch	5	Chevrolet	165	5	500	$105,375
5	8	Dale Earnhardt Jr.	8	Chevrolet	165	10	500	$141,833
6	19	Jeff Burton	31	Chevrolet	150		500	$119,316
7	7	Tony Stewart	20	Chevrolet	151	5	500	$124,486
8	26	Scott Riggs	10	Dodge	142		500	$89,275
9	2	Jamie McMurray	26	Ford	138		500	$88,525
10	33	Matt Kenseth	17	Ford	139	5	500	$130,266
11	21	Clint Bowyer	7	Chevrolet	130		500	$84,325
12	12	Kurt Busch	2	Dodge	127		500	$114,858
13	17	Ricky Rudd	88	Ford	124		500	$107,383
14	24	Ryan Newman	12	Dodge	121		500	$107,175
15	27	David Ragan *	6	Ford	118		500	$113,250
16	23	Juan Montoya *	42	Dodge	115		500	$109,850
17	9	Carl Edwards	99	Ford	112		500	$82,050
18	28	Reed Sorenson	41	Dodge	109		500	$100,083
19	4	Ken Schrader	21	Ford	106		500	$95,239
20	11	Tony Raines	96	Chevrolet	103		500	$84,550
21	37	Sterling Marlin	14	Chevrolet	100		500	$88,558
22	42	Kyle Petty	45	Dodge	97		499	$86,258
23	5	J. J. Yeley	18	Chevrolet	94		499	$100,958
24	18	Elliott Sadler	19	Dodge	96	5	498	$89,845
25	41	Kasey Kahne	9	Dodge	88		498	$115,366
26	36	Regan Smith	01	Chevrolet	85		498	$91,083
27	30	Joe Nemechek	13	Chevrolet	82		497	$67,700
28	38	Dale Jarrett	44	Toyota	79		496	$67,500
29	15	Martin Truex Jr.	1	Chevrolet	81	5	496	$96,670
30	39	Mike Bliss	49	Dodge	73		493	$79,747
31	10	Johnny Sauter	70	Chevrolet	70		493	$67,050
32	34	Greg Biffle	16	Ford	67		492	$84,925
33	43	David Reutimann *	00	Toyota	64		491	$67,650
34	25	Robby Gordon	7	Ford	61		490	$66,575
35	29	David Stremme	40	Dodge	58		490	$66,525
36	32	Jeff Green	66	Chevrolet	55		487	$74,475
37	22	Dave Blaney	22	Toyota	52		485	$74,400
38	40	A. J. Allmendinger *	84	Toyota	49		483	$66,350
39	16	David Gilliland	38	Ford	46		469	$93,514
40	13	Jeremy Mayfield	36	Toyota	43		451	$66,225
41	6	Kevin Harvick	29	Chevrolet	40		445	$114,911
42	35	Casey Mears	25	Chevrolet	37		371	$74,115
43	31	Bobby Labonte	43	Dodge	34		265	$102,409

== Did not qualify ==
The following drivers did not make the race:

Michael Waltrip (No. 55), Brian Vickers (No. 83), Paul Menard (No. 15), Kenny Wallace (No. 78), Kevin Lepage (No. 37), and Ward Burton (No. 4).

Previous race: 2007 Food City 500	Nextel Cup Series; 2007 season	Next race: 2007 Samsung 500
