= 2008 Best Buy 400 benefiting Student Clubs for Autism Speaks =

Race details
- Race 13 of 36 in the 2008 NASCAR Sprint Cup Series season
- 2008 Best Buy 400 benefiting Student Clubs for Autism Speaks program cover
- Date: June 1, 2008
- Location: Dover International Speedway, Dover, Delaware
- Course: Permanent racing facility
- Course length: 1.0 miles (1.609 km)
- Distance: 400 laps, 400 mi (643.737 km)
- Weather: Temperatures reaching up to 84.7 °F (29.3 °C); wind speeds up to 13 miles per hour (21 km/h)
- Average speed: 121.171 miles per hour (195.006 km/h)

Pole position
Driver	Greg Biffle	Roush Fenway Racing
- Time: 23.193

Most laps led
Driver	Greg Biffle	Roush Fenway Racing
- Laps: 164

Winner
No. 18	Kyle Busch	Joe Gibbs Racing

Television in the United States
- Network: Fox Broadcasting Company
- Announcers: Mike Joy, Darrell Waltrip and Larry McReynolds

The 2008 Best Buy 400 benefiting Student Clubs for Autism Speaks was the thirteenth race of the 2008 NASCAR Sprint Cup schedule which was run on Sunday, June 1 at Dover International Speedway in Delaware's state capital, and serves as a fundraiser for Autism Speaks, with $5 from each ticket sold benefitting the charity. The race was the final NASCAR telecast on Fox for the 2008 season starting at 1:30 PM US EDT and on radio via MRN and Sirius Satellite Radio at 1:15 PM US EDT.

== Pre-race news ==
- John Andretti, after finishing 16th in the Indianapolis 500, returned to the #34 Chevrolet of Front Row Motorsports replacing Jeff Green.
- With Dario Franchitti sitting out again this week (he would run in the NNS race the day before,) Jeremy Mayfield got a one-off try in the #40 Chip Ganassi Racing Dodge, qualifying an impressive 10th.
- Robby Gordon, owner/driver of the #7 Dodge, was in the Baja 500 this weekend, so Craftsman Truck Series driver Matt Crafton subbed for Gordon in qualifying and practice on Friday and Saturday. No matter what happened, the #7 Dodge started in the back as the owner is expected to drive on Sunday.

== Qualifying ==
Greg Biffle earned his 5th Cup Career pole by qualifying first for the Best Buy 400, with a time of 23.193 and a speed of 155.219. Starting alongside him was Kurt Busch, the 2004 NASCAR Nextel Cup Series Champion, with a time of 23.381.

RANK	DRIVER	NBR	CAR	TIME	SPEED	
1	Greg Biffle	16	Ford	23.193	155.219	
2	Kurt Busch	2	Dodge	23.381	153.971	
3	Kyle Busch	18	Toyota	23.412	153.767	
4	Jimmie Johnson	48	Chevrolet	23.414	153.754	
5	Jamie McMurray	26	Ford	23.438	153.597	
6	Brian Vickers	83	Toyota	23.466	153.413	
7	Jeff Gordon	24	Chevrolet	23.473	153.368	
8	A. J. Allmendinger	84	Toyota	23.543	152.912	*
9	Elliott Sadler	19	Dodge	23.549	152.873	
10	Jeremy Mayfield	40	Dodge	23.553	152.847	*
11	Ryan Newman	12	Dodge	23.563	152.782	
12	Travis Kvapil	28	Ford	23.578	152.685	
13	Paul Menard	15	Chevrolet	23.579	152.678	
14	Carl Edwards	99	Ford	23.584	152.646	
15	Kasey Kahne	9	Dodge	23.603	152.523	
16	Sam Hornish Jr.	77	Dodge	23.613	152.458	*
17	David Gilliland	38	Ford	23.628	152.362	
18	Dave Blaney	22	Toyota	23.644	152.259	
19	Bobby Labonte	43	Dodge	23.654	152.194	
20	Martin Truex Jr.	1	Chevrolet	23.668	152.104	
21	Matt Kenseth	17	Ford	23.668	152.104	
22	Tony Stewart	20	Toyota	23.672	152.078	
23	David Ragan	6	Ford	23.720	151.771	
24	Bill Elliott	21	Ford	23.726	151.732	*
25	Dale Earnhardt Jr.	88	Chevrolet	23.742	151.630	
26	Clint Bowyer	07	Chevrolet	23.743	151.624	
27	J. J. Yeley	96	Toyota	23.756	151.541	*
28	Scott Riggs	66	Chevrolet	23.758	151.528	
29	Regan Smith	01	Chevrolet	23.786	151.350	
30	Mark Martin	8	Chevrolet	23.791	151.318	
31	Joe Nemechek	78	Chevrolet	23.799	151.267	*
32	Michael McDowell	00	Toyota	23.800	151.261	
33	Denny Hamlin	11	Toyota	23.820	151.134	
34	Kevin Harvick	29	Chevrolet	23.844	150.981	
35	Juan Pablo Montoya	42	Dodge	23.869	150.823	
36	Patrick Carpentier	10	Dodge	23.887	150.710	*
37	David Reutimann	44	Toyota	23.918	150.514	
38	Jeff Burton	31	Chevrolet	23.927	150.458	
39	Tony Raines	34	Chevrolet	23.963	150.232	*
40	Jason Leffler	70	Chevrolet	23.988	150.075	*
41	Casey Mears	5	Chevrolet	24.024	149.850	
42	Michael Waltrip	55	Toyota	24.057	149.645	
43	Matt Crafton	7	Dodge	24.145	149.099	OP
44	Chad McCumbee	45	Dodge	24.173	148.926	*
45	Reed Sorenson	41	Dodge	24.209	148.705	OP

OP: qualified via owners points

PC: qualified as past champion

PR: provisional

QR: via qualifying race

* - had to qualify on time

Failed to qualify, withdrew, or driver changes: Jason Leffler (#70), Chad McCumbee (#45), Matt Crafton (#7-DC), Tony Raines (#08-WD)

== Race recap ==
There was a major wreck on lap 17 that claimed many of the front runners for the lead. This occurred when David Gilliland and Elliott Sadler touched, putting Sadler in the middle of the backstretch. Clint Bowyer, Kasey Kahne, Denny Hamlin, Paul Menard, Elliott Sadler, Tony Stewart, Bill Elliott, Kevin Harvick, Bobby Labonte, Scott Riggs, and Dale Earnhardt Jr. were all caught up in the wreck. When the smoke cleared, Kyle Busch won his fourth race of 2008.

== Results ==
POS	ST	#	DRIVER	CAR	LAPS	STATUS	LED	PTS
1	3	18	Kyle Busch	Toyota	400	running	158	190
2	14	99	Carl Edwards	Ford	400	running	64	175
3	1	16	Greg Biffle	Ford	400	running	164	175
4	21	17	Matt Kenseth	Ford	400	running	1	165
5	7	24	Jeff Gordon	Chevrolet	400	running	3	160
6	20	1	Martin Truex Jr.	Chevrolet	400	running	0	150
7	4	48	Jimmie Johnson	Chevrolet	399	running	2	151
8	38	31	Jeff Burton	Chevrolet	399	running	0	142
9	18	22	Dave Blaney	Toyota	399	running	0	138
10	5	26	Jamie McMurray	Ford	399	running	1	139
11	12	28	Travis Kvapil	Ford	399	running	0	130
12	35	42	Juan Pablo Montoya	Dodge	399	running	0	127
13	6	83	Brian Vickers	Toyota	398	running	0	124
14	11	12	Ryan Newman	Dodge	398	running	6	126
15	23	6	David Ragan	Ford	398	running	0	118
16	17	38	David Gilliland	Ford	397	running	0	115
17	39	5	Casey Mears	Chevrolet	397	running	0	112
18	16	77	Sam Hornish Jr.	Dodge	397	running	0	109
19	41	7	Robby Gordon	Dodge	397	running	0	106
20	2	2	Kurt Busch	Dodge	396	running	0	103
21	29	01	Regan Smith	Chevrolet	396	running	0	100
22	13	15	Paul Menard	Chevrolet	396	running	0	97
23	30	8	Mark Martin	Chevrolet	394	running	0	94
24	27	96	J. J. Yeley	Toyota	394	running	0	91
25	10	40	Jeremy Mayfield	Dodge	394	running	0	88
26	42	41	Reed Sorenson	Dodge	394	running	0	85
27	37	44	David Reutimann	Toyota	394	running	0	82
28	40	55	Michael Waltrip	Toyota	393	running	0	79
29	36	10	Patrick Carpentier	Dodge	393	running	0	76
30	32	00	Michael McDowell	Toyota	393	running	1	78
31	15	9	Kasey Kahne	Dodge	392	running	0	70
32	19	43	Bobby Labonte	Dodge	391	running	0	67
33	24	21	Bill Elliott	Ford	389	running	0	64
34	31	78	Joe Nemechek	Chevrolet	388	running	0	61
35	25	88	Dale Earnhardt Jr.	Chevrolet	387	running	0	58
36	26	07	Clint Bowyer	Chevrolet	381	running	0	55
37	8	84	A. J. Allmendinger	Toyota	365	running	0	52
38	34	29	Kevin Harvick	Chevrolet	326	running	0	49
39	28	66	Scott Riggs	Chevrolet	308	running	0	46
40	43	34	Tony Raines	Chevrolet	296	transmission	0	43
41	22	20	Tony Stewart	Toyota	199	crash	0	40
42	9	19	Elliott Sadler	Dodge	16	crash	0	37
43	33	11	Denny Hamlin	Toyota	16	crash	0	34
Failed to qualify, withdrew, or driver changes:
POS	NAME	NBR	OWNER	CAR				
44	Jason Leffler	70	Gene Haas	Chevrolet				
45	Chad McCumbee	45	Petty Enterprises	Dodge				
DC	Matt Crafton	7	Robby Gordon	Dodge				
WD	Tony Raines	08	John Carter	Dodge				

Previous race: 2008 Coca-Cola 600	Sprint Cup Series; 2008 season	Next race: 2008 Pocono 500
