= 2007 Samsung 500 =

Race details
- Race 7 of 36 in the 2007 NASCAR Nextel Cup Series season
- 2007 Samsung 500 program cover
- Date: April 15, 2007
- Location: Texas Motor Speedway, Fort Worth, Texas
- Course: Permanent racing facility
- Course length: 1.5 miles (2.414 km)
- Distance: 334 laps, 501 mi (806.281 km)
- Weather: Temperatures reaching up to 71.1 °F (21.7 °C); wind speeds up to 8.9 miles per hour (14.3 km/h)
- Average speed: 143.359 miles per hour (230.714 km/h)

Pole position
Driver	No time trials	

Most laps led
Driver	Jeff Gordon	Hendrick Motorsports
- Laps: 173

Winner
No. 31	Jeff Burton	Richard Childress

Television in the United States
- Network: Fox
- Announcers: Mike Joy, Darrell Waltrip and Larry McReynolds

The 2007 Samsung 500, the seventh race of the 2007 Nextel Cup Series, was held on Sunday, April 15 of that year at the 1.5-mile Texas Motor Speedway in Fort Worth, Texas. The race was won by Jeff Burton of Richard Childress Racing. Jeff Gordon would lead the most laps with 173 laps led.

== Race recap ==
Hendrick Motorsports was shooting for its fifth consecutive win as a team. The last team to accomplish this feat was Petty Enterprises in 1971. HMS driver Jeff Gordon started from pole as qualifying was rained out. The race itself featured many attritions, including a hard first lap crash involving David Ragan, J. J. Yeley, and Ricky Rudd. Gordon dominated the early part of the race until a pit mistake forced him to lose the lead. November Texas winner Tony Stewart struggled throughout the day, first being spun out after contact with rookie Juan Pablo Montoya, and being hit by Jimmie Johnson in the driver's side, and spun again later. However, Dale Earnhardt Jr., who got his first cup win at Texas, slowed to avoid the spinning Stewart, but was hit from behind by Kyle Busch, who was traveling over 30 mph faster. In the end, the race came down to former Texas Motor Speedway winners and ex-teammates Matt Kenseth and Jeff Burton. Burton attempted many times to pass Kenseth low, but he held the top spot. On the last lap, however, Burton was able to get underneath and clear Kenseth off turn 2 and hold him off to become the first repeat winner of a Cup series event held at the speedway.

While Burton won his second race, being the first repeat winner, still the past twelve races have been won by twelve different drivers, and it was the fourth different winning team at Texas Motor Speedway in the past four races (Roush, Evernham, Gibbs, Childress), with the past three teams winning at Texas winning for the first time.

On lap 288, Dale Earnhardt Jr.'s engine blew up, forcing him to retire. Meanwhile, Kyle Busch, who was also wrecked was out, but the team still wanted to compete until the end. However, Busch was nowhere to be found as he had already left the speedway. Therefore, a crew member from Busch's team asked Earnhardt Jr. if he would drive the rest of the laps to finish the car. Earnhardt agreed, and would ride the last 10 laps in Kyle Busch's No. 5 car owned by Rick Hendrick. Earnhardt Jr. said of the incident "I’ll always jump at a chance to climb into someone else’s car to see what it’s like. They used to do that all the time back in the day. You’d have relief drivers getting into someone’s car almost every week, so it was kinda like a step back into NASCAR history or something. Old school! It was cool.”

Earnhardt signed a contract with Hendrick one month after the race. Busch signed a contract to go to Joe Gibbs Racing to drive the No. 18 car.

== Race results ==
Fin	St	Driver	Car No.	Make	Points	Bonus	Laps	Winnings
1	2	Jeff Burton	31	Chevrolet	190	5	334	$526,766
2	4	Matt Kenseth	17	Ford	175	5	334	$357,266
3	6	Mark Martin	01	Chevrolet	165		334	$275,583
4	1	Jeff Gordon	24	Chevrolet	170	10	334	$255,811
5	13	Jamie McMurray	26	Ford	155		334	$173,325
6	21	Greg Biffle	16	Ford	150		334	$160,125
7	24	Martin Truex Jr.	1	Chevrolet	146		334	$164,945
8	16	Juan Montoya *	42	Dodge	142		334	$168,375
9	7	Denny Hamlin	11	Chevrolet	138		334	$143,100
10	14	David Stremme	40	Dodge	134		334	$130,175
11	17	Kurt Busch	2	Dodge	135	5	334	$157,233
12	10	Carl Edwards	99	Ford	127		334	$129,975
13	27	Tony Raines	96	Chevrolet	124		334	$131,325
14	36	Brian Vickers	83	Toyota	126	5	334	$114,325
15	42	Paul Menard *	15	Chevrolet	118		333	$113,325
16	8	Clint Bowyer	7	Chevrolet	115		333	$123,775
17	15	Elliott Sadler	19	Dodge	117	5	333	$131,870
18	25	Joe Nemechek	13	Chevrolet	109		333	$108,325
19	30	David Gilliland	38	Ford	106		332	$137,639
20	34	Kasey Kahne	9	Dodge	103		332	$154,816
21	40	Dave Blaney	22	Toyota	100		332	$137,033
22	35	Johnny Sauter	70	Chevrolet	97		332	$102,325
23	33	Casey Mears	25	Chevrolet	94		332	$113,175
24	23	Robby Gordon	7	Ford	96	5	332	$102,625
25	9	Tony Stewart	20	Chevrolet	88		332	$146,861
26	31	Jeff Green	66	Chevrolet	85		332	$121,683
27	39	Scott Riggs	10	Dodge	82		331	$105,925
28	22	Bobby Labonte	43	Dodge	79		331	$133,261
29	11	Kevin Harvick	29	Chevrolet	76		331	$140,961
30	37	Dale Jarrett	44	Toyota	73		331	$91,575
31	38	Ken Schrader	21	Ford	70		331	$112,364
32	20	Ryan Newman	12	Dodge	67		330	$122,625
33	29	Ricky Rudd	88	Ford	64		321	$118,933
34	28	Sterling Marlin	14	Chevrolet	61		304	$97,508
35	32	Kyle Petty	45	Dodge	58		291	$94,272
36	12	Dale Earnhardt Jr.	8	Chevrolet	60	5	288	$128,983
37	5	Kyle Busch	5	Chevrolet	52		262	$100,475
38	3	Jimmie Johnson	48	Chevrolet	49		260	$135,261
39	19	David Ragan *	6	Ford	46		239	$117,025
40	26	Reed Sorenson	41	Dodge	48	5	197	$89,075
41	41	Mike Bliss	49	Dodge	40		42	$80,960
42	43	Kenny Wallace	78	Chevrolet	37		38	$80,865
43	18	J. J. Yeley	18	Chevrolet	34		1	$108,898

Failed to Qualify-#00-David Reutimann, #36-Jeremy Mayfield, #37-John Andretti, #84-A. J. Allmendinger, #55-Michael Waltrip, #4-Ward Burton, #33-Scott Wimmer, #34-Kevin Lepage

Previous race: 2007 Goody's Cool Orange 500	Nextel Cup Series; 2007 season	Next race: 2007 Subway Fresh Fit 500
