= Brad Coleman =

American racing driver

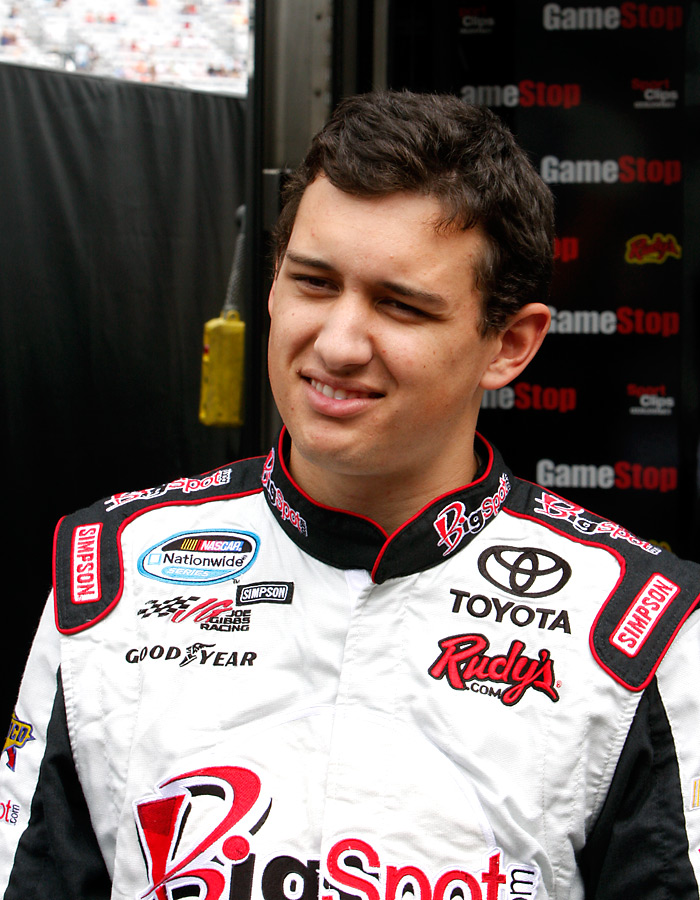
- Coleman at Bristol Motor Speedway in 2009
- Born: February 26, 1988 (age 38); Houston, Texas, U.S.
- Awards: 2005 NASCAR Dodge Weekly Series Rookie Points Champion

NASCAR Cup Series career
- 1 race run over 1 year
- Best finish: 69th (2008)
- First race: 2008 3M Performance 400 (Michigan)
Wins	Top tens	Poles
0	0	0

NASCAR O'Reilly Auto Parts Series career
- 57 races run over 5 years
- 2010 position: 50th
- Best finish: 23rd (2008)
- First race: 2006 Federated Auto Parts 300 (Nashville)
- Last race: 2010 5-Hour Energy 250 (Gateway)
Wins	Top tens	Poles
0	9	1
- Statistics up to date as of July 2, 2012.

Bradford Coleman (born February 26, 1988) is an American former professional stock car racing driver. He mostly ran full or part-time in what is now the NASCAR O'Reilly Auto Parts Series, with his last start coming in 2010. Prior to that, Coleman drove part-time in the ARCA Re/Max Series. He also made one Cup Series start in 2008. During his career, Coleman was a development driver for Brewco Motorsports and Joe Gibbs Racing.

== Racing career ==
Coleman was discovered at an indoor karting center in Houston by LeMans champion Price Cobb. He set a record at the age of sixteen years at the Rolex 24 at Daytona when he and his teammates finished seventh in the GT class driving a Porsche 911 GT3, making them the youngest team in history to drive and complete the famed race.

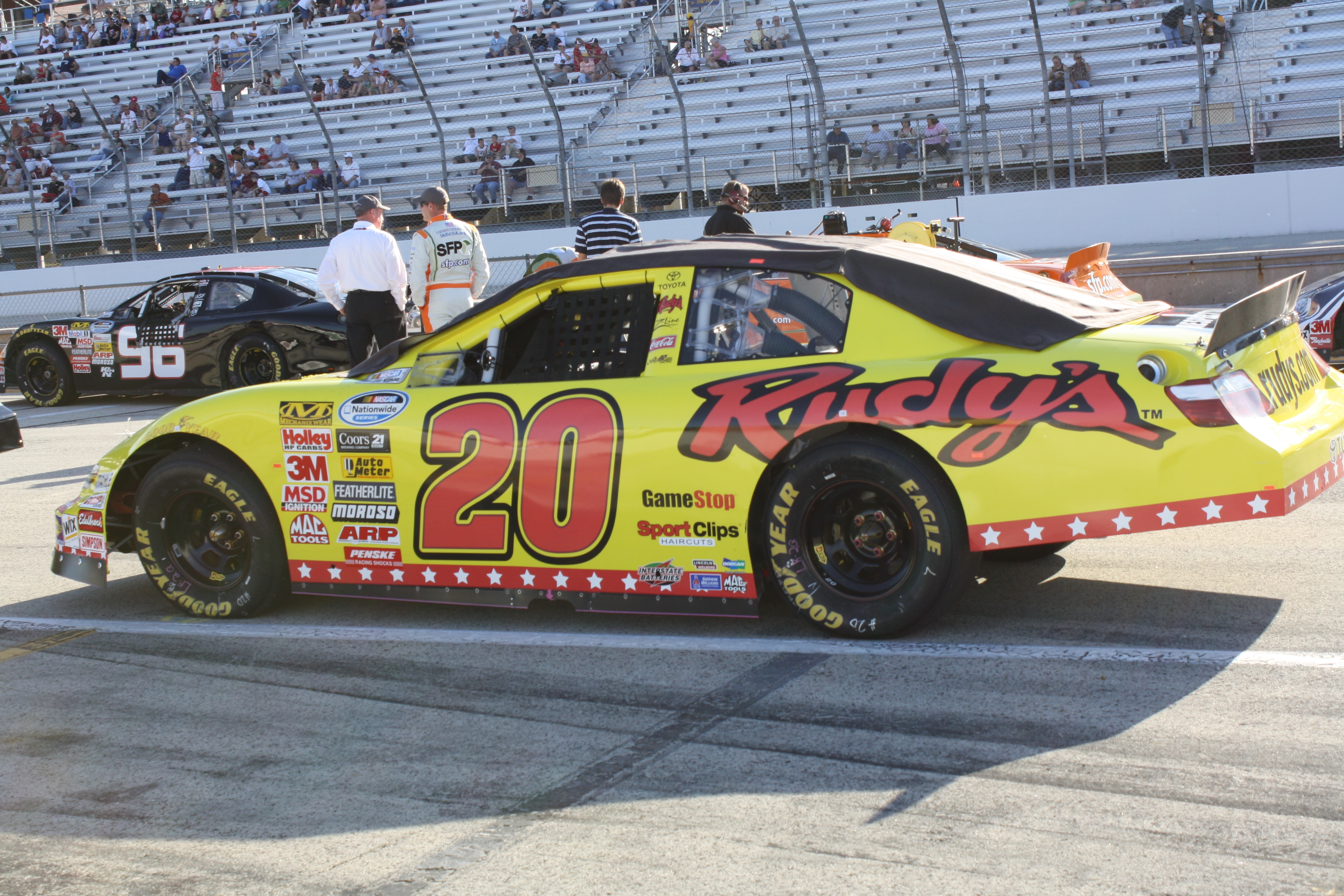
Coleman's car in 2009 at Milwaukee

Following extensive training and racing in stock cars and formula cars, Coleman made his big league stock car racing debut in the ARCA Re/Max Series at Nashville Superspeedway on April 15, 2006, where he finished second. In nine starts, Coleman posted 8 top five finishes including three poles and one win. On June 10 of the same year, Coleman made his debut in the Busch Series for Brewco Motorsports driving the No. 37 the same week he graduated from high school. He started 27th and finished 29th, five laps down. He made another start for Brewco at Kansas Speedway that same year in the No. 66 where he would DNF finishing in 41st. In 2007, Coleman ran seventeen races for Joe Gibbs Racing in the No. 18 Chevrolet in the NASCAR Busch Series with Aric Almirola, Kevin Conway, and Tony Stewart filling in the remainder. At Kentucky that year, Coleman was in line for his first win in the closing laps of the race but lost the lead to Stephen Leicht with thirteen laps to go and finished in second place. Overall, he put together three top-five finishes, five top-ten finishes, seven top-fifteen finished and nine top-twenty finishes in only fourteen races, including back to back top-five finishes at Milwaukee and Kentucky and another top-five finish at Watkins Glen.

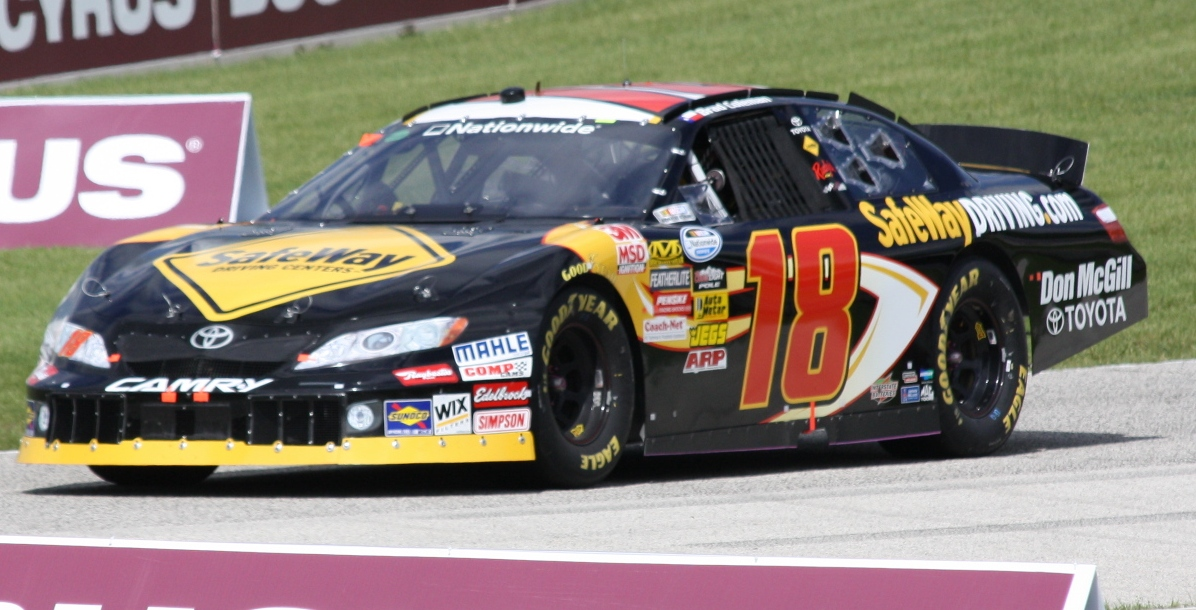
Coleman's car in 2010 at Road America

It was announced in October 2007 that Coleman would leave Joe Gibbs Racing after the 2007 season. He signed with Baker Curb to drive the No. 27 Kleenex Ford Fusion full-time in the NASCAR Nationwide Series in 2008, and it was later announced that he had signed with Hall of Fame Racing as well, with plans of running a part-time schedule in 2008, and a full-time run in 2009. He made his Sprint Cup Series debut in the No. 96 Toyota Camry starting at the 3M Performance 400 on August 17, 2008, due to previous driver J. J. Yeley being released. Due to his new Sprint Cup ride, Coleman left Baker Curb Racing. However, after only one start, he was released by Hall of Fame Racing. In 2009, Coleman returned to the Nationwide Series for Joe Gibbs Racing. He shared the No. 20 Toyota with Joey Logano and Denny Hamlin and drove eight races. In 2010, he move back to Joe Gibbs Racing's No. 18 Toyota, the car he drove in 2007 and share the ride with Kyle Busch. During the year, Coleman ran six races with a best finish of sixth, twice. He qualified on the outside front row at Kentucky, alongside teammate Joey Logano. He was running in the top-ten at Gateway until being involved in a wreck with teammate Matt DiBenedetto. At Road America he was leading inside of ten laps to go but was forced off the track on a late restart by Brad Keselowski but recovered to finish sixth.

== Personal life ==
Coleman was a high school graduate of Carlisle School.

== Motorsports career results ==
=== NASCAR ===
(key) (Bold – Pole position awarded by qualifying time. Italics – Pole position earned by points standings or practice time. * – Most laps led.)

==== Sprint Cup Series ====
NASCAR Sprint Cup Series results
Year	Team	No.	Make	1	2	3	4	5	6	7	8	9	10	11	12	13	14	15	16	17	18	19	20	21	22	23	24	25	26	27	28	29	30	31	32	33	34	35	36–	NSCC	Pts	Ref
2008	Hall of Fame Racing	96	Toyota	DAY	CAL	LVS	ATL	BRI	MAR	TEX	PHO	TAL	RCH	DAR	CLT	DOV	POC	MCH	SON	NHA	DAY	CHI	IND	POC	GLN	MCH; 38	BRI	CAL	RCH	NHA	DOV	KAN	TAL	CLT	MAR	ATL	TEX	PHO	HOM	69th	49	

==== Nationwide Series ====
NASCAR Nationwide Series results
Year	Team	No.	Make	1	2	3	4	5	6	7	8	9	10	11	12	13	14	15	16	17	18	19	20	21	22	23	24	25	26	27	28	29	30	31	32	33	34	35	NNSC	Pts	Ref
2006	Brewco Motorsports	37	Ford	DAY	CAL	MXC	LVS	ATL	BRI	TEX	NSH	PHO	TAL	RCH	DAR	CLT	DOV	NSH; 29	KEN	MLW	DAY	CHI	NHA	MAR	GTY	IRP	GLN	MCH	BRI	CAL	RCH	DOV							108th	116	
2006	Brewco Motorsports	66	Ford																														KAN; 41	CLT	MEM	TEX	PHO	HOM	108th	116	
2007	Joe Gibbs Racing	18	Chevy	DAY	CAL	MXC; 38	LVS; 35	ATL	BRI	NSH; 15	TEX; 16	PHO	**TAL**; 9	RCH; 27	DAR	CLT	DOV	NSH	KEN; 2	MLW; 4	NHA	DAY	CHI	GTY; 27	IRP; 31	CGV; 8	GLN; 5	MCH; 15	BRI; 17	CAL	RCH	DOV; 42	KAN	CLT	MEM; 33	TEX	PHO; 16	HOM	33rd	1795	
2008	Baker Curb Racing	27	Ford	DAY; 26	CAL; 19	LVS; 9	ATL; 35	BRI; 33	NSH; 27	TEX; 22	PHO; 23	MXC; 16	TAL; 24	RCH; 26	DAR; 12	CLT; 21	DOV; 32	NSH; 35	KEN; 15	MLW; 25	NHA; 31	DAY; 21	CHI; 30	GTY; 17	IRP; 23	CGV; 21	GLN; 10	MCH	BRI	CAL	RCH	DOV	KAN	CLT	MEM	TEX	PHO	HOM	23rd	2271	
2009	Joe Gibbs Racing	20	Toyota	DAY	CAL	LVS	BRI	TEX	NSH	PHO	TAL	RCH	DAR	CLT	DOV	NSH; 10	KEN	MLW; 24	NHA	DAY	CHI	GTY; 5	IRP; 16	IOW; 13	GLN	MCH; 23	BRI; 29	CGV; 28	ATL	RCH	DOV	KAN	CAL	CLT	MEM	TEX	PHO	HOM	52nd	873	
2010	Joe Gibbs Racing	18	Toyota	DAY	CAL	LVS	BRI	NSH	PHO	TEX	TAL	RCH	DAR	DOV	CLT	NSH; 6	KEN; 13	ROA; 6	NHA	DAY	CHI	GTY; 30	IRP	IOW	GLN	MCH	BRI	CGV; 12	ATL	RCH	DOV	KAN	CAL	CLT	GTY; 8	TEX	PHO	HOM	50th	776	

=== ARCA Re/Max Series ===
(key) (Bold – Pole position awarded by qualifying time. Italics – Pole position earned by points standings or practice time. * – Most laps led.)

ARCA Re/Max Series results
Year	Team	No.	Make	1	2	3	4	5	6	7	8	9	10	11	12	13	14	15	16	17	18	19	20	21	22	23	ARMC	Pts	Ref
2006	Brewco Motorsports	62	Ford	DAY	NSH; 2	**SLM**; 32	WIN	KEN; 2	TOL	POC	MCH; 5	**KAN**; 3	KEN; 1*	BLN	POC	GTW; 3	**NSH**; 3*	MCH; 5	ISF	MIL	TOL	DSF	CHI	SLM	TAL	IOW	26th	1900	
2007	Bobby Gerhart Racing	94	Chevy	DAY; 32	USA	NSH	SLM	KAN	WIN	KEN	TOL	IOW	POC	MCH	BLN	KEN	POC	NSH	ISF	MIL	GTW	DSF	CHI	SLM	TAL	TOL	163rd	70	
