= Hall of Fame Racing =

Former NASCAR team

- Owner(s): Roger Staubach, Troy Aikman, Bill Saunders (2006–2007); Jeff Moorad, Tom Garfinkel, Tom Davin (2008–2009)
- Base: Concord, North Carolina
- Series: NASCAR Sprint Cup Series
- Race drivers: Terry Labonte (2006); Tony Raines (2006–2007) Ron Fellows (2007); J. J. Yeley (2008); P. J. Jones (2008); Brad Coleman (2008); Ken Schrader (2008); Joey Logano (2008); Bobby Labonte (2009); Erik Darnell (2009)
- Manufacturer: Chevy (2006–2007); Toyota (2008); Ford (2009)
- Opened: 2005
- Closed: 2010

Career
- Drivers' Championships: 0
- Race victories: 0

Hall of Fame Racing was a NASCAR Sprint Cup Series racing team principally owned by former Dallas Cowboys quarterbacks Roger Staubach, Troy Aikman and veteran Trans Am driver Bill Saunders. The team was founded in 2006 and sponsored by Texas Instruments DLP division. In 2007 with drivers Tony Raines and Ron Fellows (for the road courses) behind the wheel of the No. 96 DLP Chevrolet, the team would finish 25th in owners points. The team was sold to Jeff Moorad and Tom Garfinkle after the 2007 season and eventually closed after the 2009 season.

== History ==
=== Car No. 96 history ===
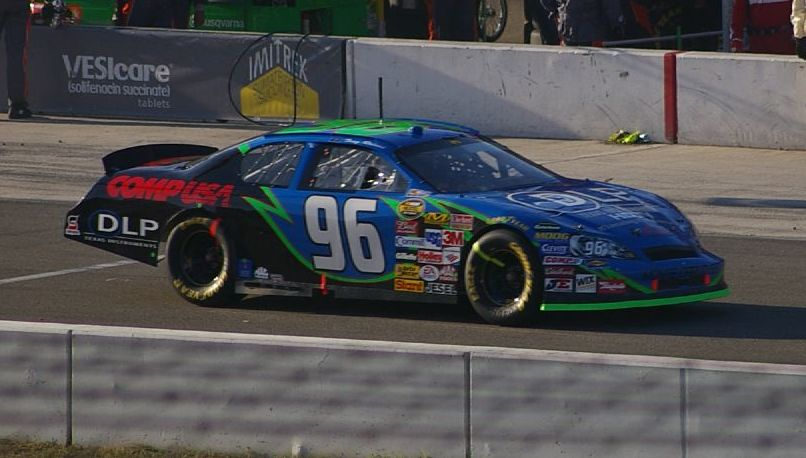
Tony Raines in the No. 96 at California Speedway in 2006

Terry Labonte and Tony Raines (2006)

Hall of Fame Racing was first rumored in 2003, but it took three years to start competing. The team announced at Texas Motor Speedway on November 3, 2005, that for the 2006 season, the team would be operating only one car, the No. 96 sponsored by Texas Instruments' Digital Light Processing technology. As a new team with nothing to fall back on, Terry Labonte took advantage of the Past Champion's Provisional and drove the car for the first five races, placing it inside the top 35 in the point standings, and guaranteeing a starting spot in upcoming races. Labonte also drove the car at the two road courses, with Tony Raines racing at the others. Raines and the team had a solid night during the Bank of America 500 at Charlotte Motor Speedway, taking the lead for 28 laps and finishing in 7th place. The team's highest finish in 2006 was third at Infineon Raceway with Labonte at the wheel, and finished 26th in owners points.

Tony Raines (2007)

Raines was to compete in 2007 on a full-time basis, however those plans changed after the year began, when it was announced that road course driver Ron Fellows would take the wheel at the road courses at Infineon Raceway and Watkins Glen. Fellows went on to finish 15th at Infineon and 4th at the Glen, and Raines' best finish was 9th at the UAW-Ford 500. Raines was able to earn the team 25th in the final owners' points standings, however, the highest finish for any single car team in the Sprint Cup Series since 2005 with the Wood Brothers and Ricky Rudd, and also improving upon HOF's 26th-place finish the year before. Raines ended 2007 with 18 top 25 finishes.

J. J. Yeley (2008)

For 2008, the team decided to hire J. J. Yeley from Joe Gibbs Racing. The contract was to last throughout 2010, and it was announced that they would be switching to Toyota. With Yeley at the wheel, the team quickly fell out of the top 35 in points and, by the end of the year, failed to qualify for five races. In August 2008, Hall of Fame Racing released Yeley, replacing him with Brad Coleman for one race, and later Ken Schrader and Joey Logano. P. J. Jones also ran a one-off race for HOF Racing at Watkins Glen, finishing 37th. The team's highest finish in 2008 was 3rd at New Hampshire with Yeley in a rained shorted race, but finished better than 25th only 5 times out of 36 attempts, and ended the year 39th in the Nextel Cup Series owners standings (out of 43 full-time teams). It was also announced in September 2008 that Troy Aikman, Roger Staubach, Bill Saunders and Mark Griege were no longer part of the ownership group, leaving only Moorad, Garfunkel, and Whitman as the owners.

Brad Coleman had signed a development contract with Hall of Fame and was expected to drive the car in 2009, but he was reported to be released at the end of the year and replaced by Bobby Labonte after running only one race for the team in 2008.

Bobby Labonte (2009)

On January 13, 2009, Hall of Fame Racing announced an alignment with Yates Racing. Technically, Hall of Fame Racing closed its doors, laying off all of its employees, and brought over sponsorship to the former No. 38 car, changing the number to No. 96. Bobby Labonte was to be the full-time driver with sponsorship from search engine Ask.com, who provided primary sponsorship for 18 races, Academy Sports and Outdoors for 5 races, and Texas Instruments/DLP for 8 races. However, in August due to sponsorship problems, Labonte was replaced by Roush Fenway Racing Nationwide Series driver Erik Darnell, for 7 of the last 12 races. Darnell came over with sponsorship from Northern Tool and Equipment and Labonte replaced David Gilliland in the 71 TRG Motorsports car. The team ended the season 31st in owners points, with only 1 top-5 finish.

Following the 2009 season, Yates Racing merged with Richard Petty Motorsports and Front Row Motorsports, and the No. 96 team was shut down. The car owner points were transferred to Front Row for the 2010 season.

==== Car No. 96 results ====
NASCAR Sprint Cup Series results
| Year | Team | No. | Make | 1 | 2 | 3 | 4 | 5 | 6 | 7 | 8 | 9 | 10 | 11 | 12 | 13 | 14 | 15 | 16 | 17 | 18 | 19 | 20 | 21 | 22 | 23 | 24 | 25 | 26 | 27 | 28 | 29 | 30 | 31 | 32 | 33 | 34 | 35 | 36 | NSCC | Pts |
|---|---|---|---|---|---|---|---|---|---|---|---|---|---|---|---|---|---|---|---|---|---|---|---|---|---|---|---|---|---|---|---|---|---|---|---|---|---|---|---|---|---|
| 2006 | Terry Labonte | 96 | Chevy | DAY; 17 | CAL; 34 | LVS; 24 | ATL; 22 | BRI; 27 | | | | | | | | | | | SON; 3 | | | | | | GLN; 37 | | | | | | | | | | | | | | | 26th | 3259 |
| 2006 | Tony Raines | 96 | Chevy | | | | | | MAR; 21 | TEX; 24 | PHO; 17 | TAL; 17 | RCH; 30 | DAR; 20 | CLT; 40 | DOV; 26 | POC; 16 | MCH; 38 | | DAY; 21 | CHI; 40 | NHA; 22 | POC; 21 | IND; 11 | | MCH; 32 | BRI; 25 | CAL; 37 | RCH; 39 | NHA; 26 | DOV; 23 | KAN; 28 | TAL; 20 | CLT; 7 | MAR; 14 | ATL; 34 | TEX; 19 | PHO; 21 | HOM; 20 | 26th | 3259 |
| 2007 | Tony Raines | 96 | Chevy | DAY; 33 | CAL; 23 | LVS; 19 | ATL; 38 | BRI; 24 | MAR; 20 | TEX; 13 | PHO; 14 | TAL; 22 | RCH; 22 | DAR; 39 | CLT; 14 | DOV; 21 | POC; 36 | MCH; 39 | | NHA; 20 | DAY; 39 | CHI; 24 | IND; 41 | POC; 15 | | MCH; 34 | BRI; 28 | CAL; 27 | RCH; 35 | NHA; 21 | DOV; 36 | KAN; 18 | TAL; 9 | CLT; 31 | MAR; 14 | ATL; 23 | TEX; 20 | PHO; 37 | HOM; 29 | 25th | 3203 |
| 2007 | Ron Fellows | 96 | Chevy | | | | | | | | | | | | | | | | SON; 15 | | | | | | GLN; 4 | | | | | | | | | | | | | | | 25th | 3203 |
| 2008 | J. J. Yeley | 96 | Toyota | DAY; 25 | CAL; 29 | LVS; 27 | ATL; 37 | BRI; 25 | MAR; 27 | TEX; 42 | PHO; 39 | TAL; DNQ | RCH; 34 | DAR; 26 | CLT; 38 | DOV; 24 | POC; DNQ | MCH; 41 | SON; DNQ | NHA; 3 | DAY; DNQ | CHI; 24 | IND; 28 | POC; 39 | | | | | | | | | | | | | | | | 39th | 2368 |
| 2008 | P. J. Jones | 96 | Toyota | | | | | | | | | | | | | | | | | | | | | | GLN; 37 | | | | | | | | | | | | | | | 39th | 2368 |
| 2008 | Brad Coleman | 96 | Toyota | | | | | | | | | | | | | | | | | | | | | | | MCH; 38 | | | | | | | | | | | | | | 39th | 2368 |
| 2008 | Ken Schrader | 96 | Toyota | | | | | | | | | | | | | | | | | | | | | | | | BRI; 21 | CAL; 41 | RCH; 27 | | DOV; 33 | | TAL; 16 | CLT; 38 | MAR; 28 | ATL; 35 | TEX; 30 | PHO; 27 | HOM; DNQ | 39th | 2368 |
| 2008 | Joey Logano | 96 | Toyota | | | | | | | | | | | | | | | | | | | | | | | | | | | NHA; 32 | | KAN; 39 | | | | | | | | 39th | 2368 |
| 2009 | Bobby Labonte | 96 | Ford | DAY; 22 | CAL; 20 | LVS; 5 | ATL; 40 | BRI; 22 | MAR; 16 | TEX; 40 | PHO; 29 | TAL; 28 | RCH; 31 | DAR; 18 | CLT; 12 | DOV; 28 | POC; 28 | MCH; 28 | SON; 20 | NHA; 21 | DAY; 21 | CHI; 21 | IND; 23 | POC; 36 | GLN; 20 | MCH; 43 | BRI; 36 | | RCH; 31 | | DOV; 23 | | CAL; 26 | CLT; 31 | MAR; 13 | | | | | 31st | 3035 |
| 2009 | Erik Darnell | 96 | Ford | | | | | | | | | | | | | | | | | | | | | | | | | ATL; 30 | | NHA; 30 | | KAN; 29 | | | | TAL; 37 | TEX; 30 | PHO; 31 | HOM; 36 | 31st | 3035 |
