= 2008 Sharpie 500 =

Race details
- Race 24 of 36 in the 2008 NASCAR Sprint Cup Series season
- 2008 Sharpie 500 program cover
- Date: August 23, 2008
- Official name: Sharpie 500
- Location: Bristol Motor Speedway, Bristol, Tennessee
- Course: Permanent racing facility
- Course length: 0.533 miles (0.857 km)
- Distance: 500 laps, 266.5 mi (428.89 km)
- Weather: Temperatures averaging around 74.5 °F (23.6 °C); wind speeds up to 11.1 miles per hour (17.9 km/h)
- Average speed: 91.581 miles per hour (147.385 km/h)

Pole position
Driver	Carl Edwards	Roush Fenway Racing
- Time: 15.746

Most laps led
Driver	Kyle Busch	Joe Gibbs Racing
- Laps: 415

Winner
No. 99	Carl Edwards	Roush Fenway Racing

Television in the United States
- Network: ESPN
- Announcers: Jerry Punch, Andy Petree and Dale Jarrett

The 2008 Sharpie 500 was the twenty-fourth race of the 2008 NASCAR Sprint Cup season and was raced on Saturday night, August 23 at Bristol Motor Speedway in Bristol, Tennessee.

== Pre-race news ==
- Ken Schrader will drive the No. 96 Hall of Fame Racing Toyota this week in place of Brad Coleman.
- Four drivers in the second through fifth positions can clinch spots in the 2008 Chase for the Sprint Cup this week. Carl Edwards, Jeff Burton, Jimmie Johnson and Dale Earnhardt Jr. can lock up positions by finishing this week's race.

== Qualifying ==
Carl Edwards won the pole for the race.

RANK	DRIVER	NBR	CAR	TIME	SPEED	
1	Carl Edwards	99	Ford	15.746	121.860	
2	David Reutimann	44	Toyota	15.835	121.175	
3	Jeff Gordon	24	Chevrolet	15.842	121.121	
4	Regan Smith	01	Chevrolet	15.847	121.083	
5	Bill Elliott	21	Ford	15.892	120.740	*
6	Kevin Harvick	29	Chevrolet	15.904	120.649	
7	Ken Schrader	96	Toyota	15.906	120.634	*
8	A.J. Allmendinger	84	Toyota	15.912	120.588	*
9	Kyle Busch	18	Toyota	15.917	120.550	
10	Elliott Sadler	19	Dodge	15.920	120.528	
11	Ryan Newman	12	Dodge	15.922	120.512	
12	Martin Truex, Jr.	1	Chevrolet	15.947	120.324	
13	Kasey Kahne	9	Dodge	15.948	120.316	
14	Greg Biffle	16	Ford	15.957	120.248	
15	David Gilliland	38	Ford	15.963	120.203	
16	Paul Menard	15	Chevrolet	15.963	120.203	
17	Casey Mears	5	Chevrolet	15.966	120.180	
18	Jeff Burton	31	Chevrolet	15.970	120.150	
19	Kurt Busch	2	Dodge	15.974	120.120	
20	Tony Raines	70	Chevrolet	15.978	120.090	*
21	Denny Hamlin	11	Toyota	15.979	120.083	
22	Clint Bowyer	07	Chevrolet	15.979	120.083	
23	Aric Almirola	8	Chevrolet	15.979	120.083	
24	Sterling Marlin	09	Chevrolet	15.985	120.038	*
25	Matt Kenseth	17	Ford	15.990	120.000	
26	Brian Vickers	83	Toyota	15.994	119.970	
27	David Ragan	6	Ford	16.019	119.783	
28	Tony Stewart	20	Toyota	16.021	119.768	
29	Kyle Petty	45	Dodge	16.041	119.618	*
30	Reed Sorenson	41	Dodge	16.043	119.604	
31	Robby Gordon	7	Dodge	16.045	119.589	
32	Travis Kvapil	28	Ford	16.060	119.477	
33	Mike Skinner	00	Toyota	16.071	119.395	*
34	Jimmie Johnson	48	Chevrolet	16.084	119.299	
35	Sam Hornish, Jr.	77	Dodge	16.086	119.284	
36	Dave Blaney	22	Toyota	16.099	119.188	
37	Joe Nemechek	78	Chevrolet	16.102	119.165	*
38	Jeff Green	34	Chevrolet	16.121	119.025	*
39	Bobby Labonte	43	Dodge	16.141	118.877	
40	Patrick Carpentier	10	Dodge	16.144	118.855	*
41	Scott Riggs	66	Chevrolet	16.164	118.708	
42	Juan Pablo Montoya	42	Dodge	16.172	118.650	
43	Dale Earnhardt, Jr.	88	Chevrolet	16.216	118.328	OP
44	Jamie McMurray	26	Ford	16.232	118.211	OP
45	Michael Waltrip	55	Toyota	16.366	117.243	OP
46	Johnny Sauter	08	Dodge	16.623	115.430	*

OP: qualified via owners points

PC: qualified as past champion

PR: provisional

QR: via qualifying race

* - had to qualify on time

Failed to qualify: Jeff Green (#34), Johnny Sauter (#70), Patrick Carpentier (#10)

== Race recap ==
Since the addition of the Car of Tomorrow and the repaving of the track, many fans thought that the old days of Bristol were over. These thoughts however were blown away in the closing laps of the race when Carl Edwards used the "Bump and Run" technique to get past Kyle Busch for the win, causing a post race confrontation where Busch rammed into the side of Edwards car during the cool down lap. Edwards responded by spinning Busch out as Busch turned to enter pit road. Busch used the same technique to take the lead from Carl Edwards on lap 55. Kyle Busch was called to the NASCAR Hauler after his post-race interview for the incident, and on August 27, both Edwards and Kyle Busch were put on probation for the next six Sprint Cup Races. The race was also red-flagged at Lap 210 after an accident commonly called "The Big One" saw nine cars - including Chase contender Kasey Kahne - pile up in Turn 2.

There were only three lap leaders the entire race. Edwards and Busch led 499 laps combined, while Jeff Gordon led a lap.

== Results ==
POS	ST	#	DRIVER	SPONSOR / OWNER	CAR	LAPS	MONEY	STATUS	LED	PTS
1	1	99	Carl Edwards	Office Depot (Jack Roush)	Ford	500	344625	running	84	190
2	9	18	Kyle Busch	M&M's (Joe Gibbs)	Toyota	500	220675	running	415	180
3	21	11	Denny Hamlin	FedEx Freight (Joe Gibbs)	Toyota	500	202716	running	0	165
4	6	29	Kevin Harvick	Pennzoil Platinum (Richard Childress)	Chevrolet	500	184511	running	0	160
5	3	24	Jeff Gordon	DuPont (Rick Hendrick)	Chevrolet	500	167561	running	1	160
6	11	12	Ryan Newman	Alltel (Roger Penske)	Dodge	500	156950	running	0	150
7	22	07	Clint Bowyer	Jack Daniel's (Richard Childress)	Chevrolet	500	125425	running	0	146
8	28	20	Tony Stewart	Home Depot (Joe Gibbs)	Toyota	500	152261	running	0	142
9	25	17	Matt Kenseth	DeWalt (Jack Roush)	Ford	500	149591	running	0	138
10	27	6	David Ragan	AAA Insurance (Jack Roush)	Ford	500	115775	running	0	134
11	14	16	Greg Biffle	Dish Network Turbo HD (Jack Roush)	Ford	500	110525	running	0	130
12	41	26	Jamie McMurray	Sharpie Pen (Jack Roush)	Ford	500	114175	running	0	127
13	23	8	Aric Almirola	U.S. Army (Dale Earnhardt, Inc.)	Chevrolet	500	136733	running	0	124
14	4	01	Regan Smith	DEI / Principal Financial Group (Dale Earnhardt, Inc.)	Chevrolet	500	109225	running	0	121
15	19	2	Kurt Busch	Miller Lite (Roger Penske)	Dodge	500	99175	running	0	118
16	16	15	Paul Menard	Menards / Quaker State (Dale Earnhardt, Inc.)	Chevrolet	499	106550	running	0	115
17	20	70	Tony Raines	Hunt Brothers Pizza (Gene Haas)	Chevrolet	499	94200	running	0	112
18	40	88	Dale Earnhardt, Jr.	National Guard / AMP Energy (Rick Hendrick)	Chevrolet	498	104725	running	0	109
19	39	42	Juan Pablo Montoya	Juicy Fruit Slim Pack (Chip Ganassi)	Dodge	498	124008	running	0	106
20	26	83	Brian Vickers	Red Bull (Dietrich Mateschitz)	Toyota	498	103450	running	0	103
21	7	96	Ken Schrader	DLP HDTV (Jeff Moorad)	Toyota	498	105050	running	0	100
22	15	38	David Gilliland	Ford. Drive One. (Yates Racing)	Ford	498	112208	running	0	97
23	37	43	Bobby Labonte	Cheerios / Box Tops for Education (Petty Enterprises)	Dodge	498	130311	running	0	94
24	32	28	Travis Kvapil	Knight Rider (Yates Racing)	Ford	498	120864	running	0	91
25	2	44	David Reutimann	UPS (Michael Waltrip)	Toyota	497	93075	running	0	88
26	5	21	Bill Elliott	Motorcraft / Quick Lane (Wood Brothers)	Ford	497	106395	running	0	85
27	38	66	Scott Riggs	State Water Heaters (Gene Haas)	Chevrolet	496	106688	running	0	82
28	33	00	Mike Skinner	Champion Mortgage (Michael Waltrip)	Toyota	496	104178	running	0	79
29	43	78	Joe Nemechek	Furniture Row / DenverMattress.com (Barney Visser)	Chevrolet	494	86910	running	0	76
30	42	55	Michael Waltrip	NAPA Auto Parts (Michael Waltrip)	Toyota	492	101433	running	0	73
31	29	45	Kyle Petty	Wells Fargo (Petty Enterprises)	Dodge	491	96212	running	0	70
32	10	19	Elliott Sadler	Stanley (Gillett Evernham Motorsports)	Dodge	490	112900	running	0	67
33	34	48	Jimmie Johnson	Lowe's (Rick Hendrick)	Chevrolet	482	141531	running	0	64
34	8	84	A.J. Allmendinger	Red Bull (Dietrich Mateschitz)	Toyota	400	86335	running	0	61
35	12	1	Martin Truex, Jr.	Bass Pro Shops / Red Head (Dale Earnhardt, Inc.)	Chevrolet	396	117233	running	0	58
36	30	41	Reed Sorenson	Tums Quik Pack (Chip Ganassi)	Dodge	383	113304	running	0	55
37	35	77	Sam Hornish, Jr.	Mobil 1 (Roger Penske)	Dodge	297	131530	crash	0	52
38	36	22	Dave Blaney	Caterpillar (Bill Davis)	Toyota	279	85845	crash	0	49
39	31	7	Robby Gordon	Planet Color / Barrett-Jackson (Robby Gordon)	Dodge	227	93735	crash	0	46
40	13	9	Kasey Kahne	Budweiser (Gillett Evernham Motorsports)	Dodge	215	115616	crash	0	43
41	17	5	Casey Mears	Pop Tarts / Carquest (Rick Hendrick)	Chevrolet	214	103475	crash	0	40
42	18	31	Jeff Burton	AT&T Mobility (Richard Childress)	Chevrolet	195	130763	crash	0	37
43	24	09	Sterling Marlin	Miccosukee Resorts & Gaming (James Finch)	Chevrolet	184	85570	crash	0	34

Previous race: 2008 3M Performance 400	Sprint Cup Series; 2008 season	Next race: 2008 Pepsi 500
