= 2008 Coke Zero 400 =

Race details
- Race 18 of 36 in the 2008 NASCAR Sprint Cup Series
- 2008 Coke Zero 400 program cover, featuring the 2007 Coke Zero 400 finish
- Date: July 5, 2008
- Official name: Coke Zero 400
- Location: Daytona International Speedway in Daytona Beach, Florida.
- Course: Permanent racing facility
- Course length: 2.5 miles (4 km)
- Distance: 162 laps, 405 mi (651.784 km)
- Scheduled distance: 160 laps, 400 mi (643.737 km)
- Weather: Temperatures reaching as low as 71.1 °F (21.7 °C); wind speeds up to 11.1 miles per hour (17.9 km/h)
- Average speed: 138.554 miles per hour (222.981 km/h)

Pole position
Driver	Paul Menard	Dale Earnhardt, Inc.
- Time: 48.409

Most laps led
Driver	Dale Earnhardt Jr.	Hendrick Motorsports
- Laps: 51

Winner
No. 18	Kyle Busch	Joe Gibbs Racing

Television in the United States
- Network: Turner Network Television
- Announcers: Bill Weber, Wally Dallenbach Jr. and Kyle Petty

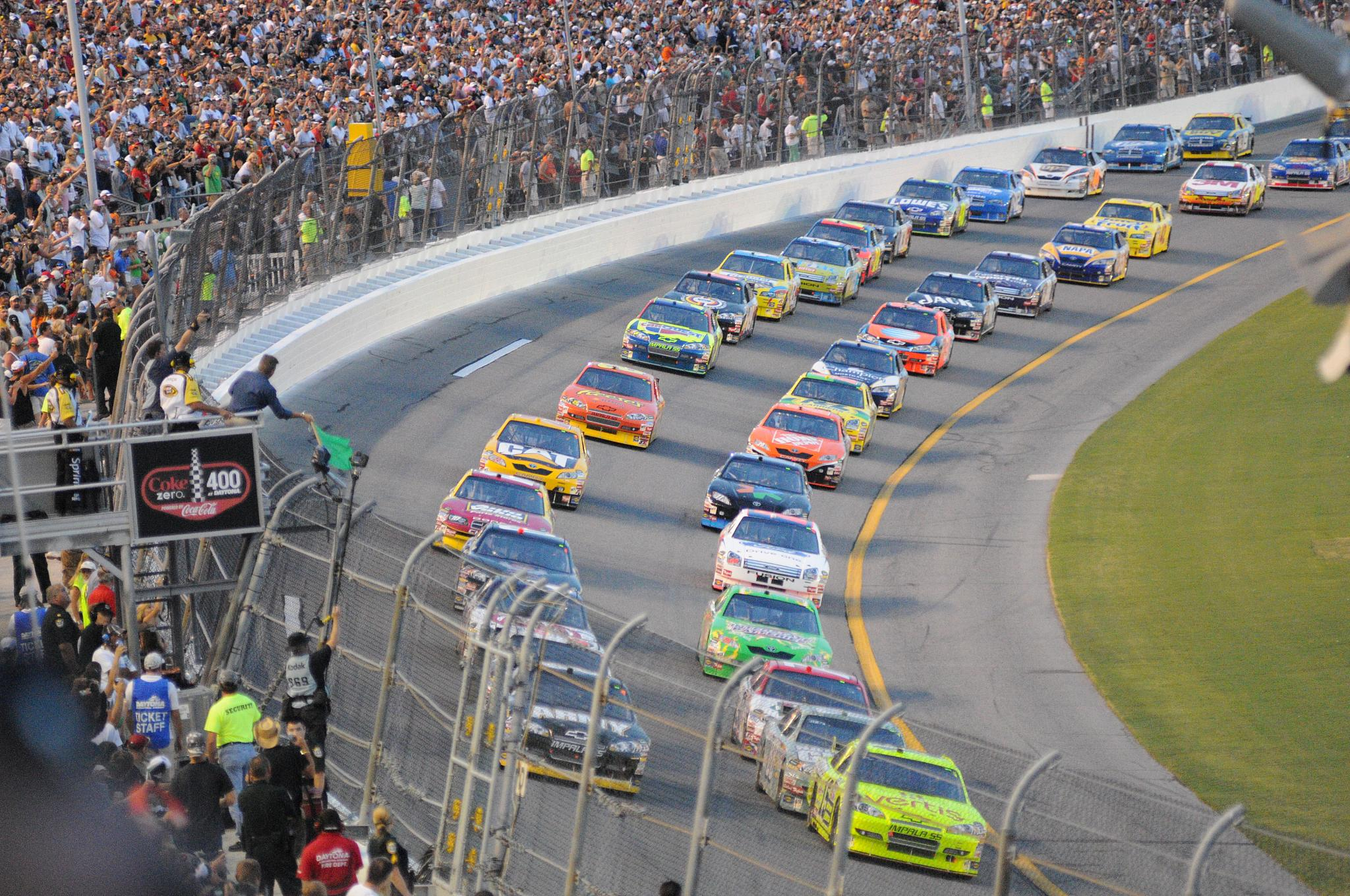
The start of the 2008 Coke Zero 400.

The 2008 Coke Zero 400 Powered by Coca-Cola was the eighteenth race of the 2008 NASCAR Sprint Cup season, marking the official halfway point of the season.

== Background ==
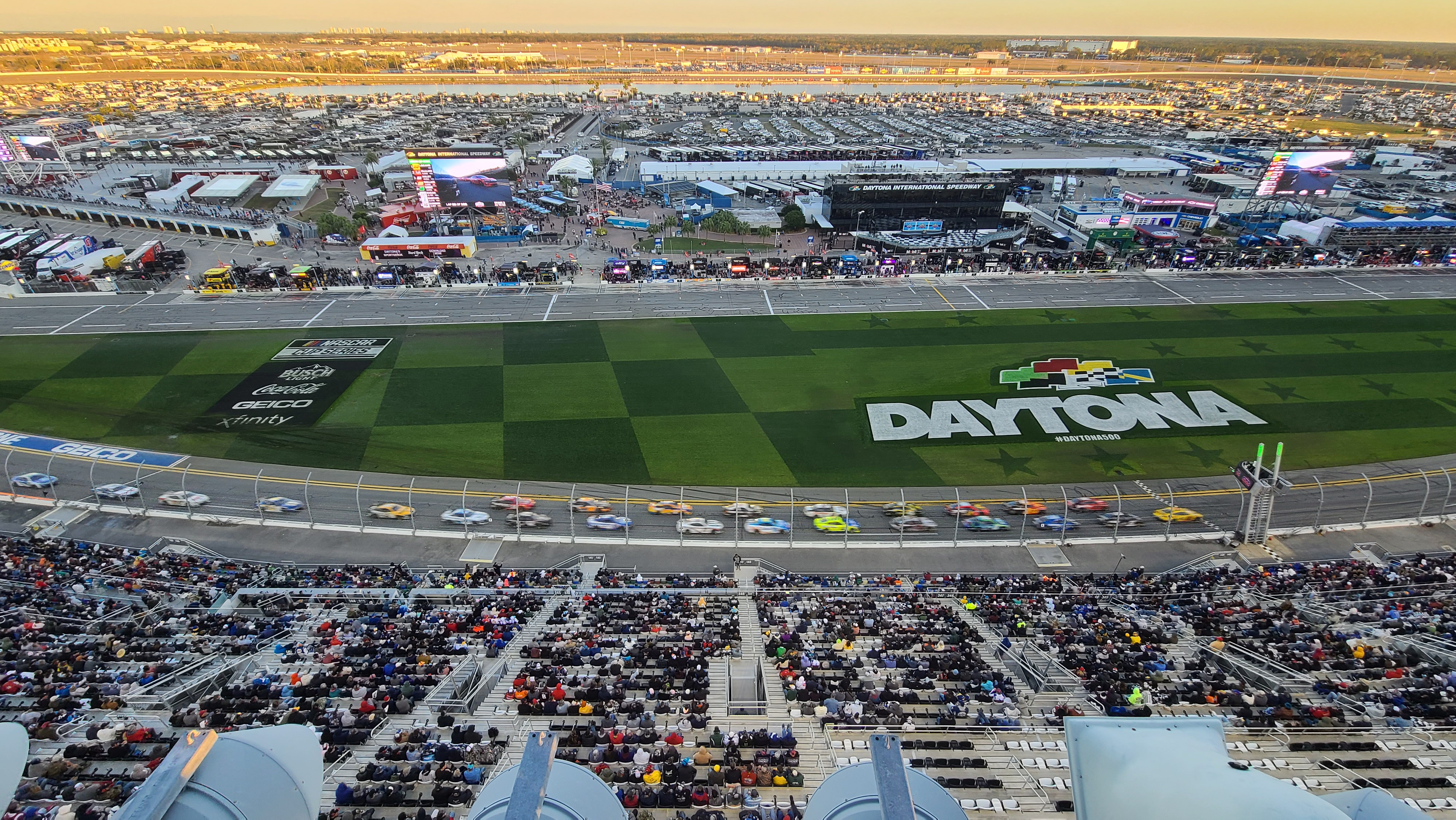
View of cars racing on the front stretch at the 2024 Daytona 500, held at Daytona International Speedway.

Daytona International Speedway is one of three superspeedways to hold NASCAR races, the other two being Atlanta Motor Speedway and Talladega Superspeedway. The standard track at Daytona International Speedway is a four-turn superspeedway that is 2.5 miles (4.0 km) long. The track's turns are banked at 31 degrees, while the front stretch, the location of the finish line, is banked at 18 degrees.

== Summary ==
This race was held on July 5 of that year at Daytona International Speedway in Daytona Beach, Florida, and was the third race utilizing restrictor plates this season. TNT's air time began at 6:30 PM EDT, and MRN with Sirius Satellite Radio carried the radio broadcast beginning at 7:15 PM US EDT.

=== Pre-Race news ===
- Dario Franchitti is out of a ride and Chip Ganassi Racing's #40 car is out of the series. The Dodge team shut down July 1 due to a lack of permanent sponsorship along with a lack of success in qualifying for races, even with Franchitti injured earlier in the season. Ganassi Racing fired some 70 employees who had been working on the car at the time of closure.
- The Dale Earnhardt, Inc. #1 car driven by Truex was a backup car, as NASCAR impounded the primary car due to a rules violation on the roof in a pre-practice inspection. On July 8, Martin Truex Jr. was docked 150 driver points, the team docked 150 owners points, and their crew chief slapped with the now seemingly mandatory $100,000 fine, six-week suspension and probation until December 31.
- David Reutimann tied the record for most consecutive Lucky Dog passes due to a pitting strategy that forced him to pit about 6 laps before the other leaders did. As soon as he pitted, a caution came out almost instantly. As a result, Reutimann finished 21st.

== Qualifying ==
Paul Menard won his first pole of his career in Sprint Cup racing, edging his teammate, Mark Martin out for the honor.

RANK	DRIVER	NBR	CAR	TIME	SPEED	
1	Paul Menard	15	Chevrolet	48.409	185.916	
2	Mark Martin	8	Chevrolet	48.421	185.870	
3	Dale Earnhardt Jr.	88	Chevrolet	48.534	185.437	
4	Joe Nemechek	78	Chevrolet	48.573	185.288	*
5	Johnny Sauter	70	Chevrolet	48.583	185.250	*
6	David Ragan	6	Ford	48.584	185.246	
7	Boris Said	60	Ford	48.601	185.181	*
8	Regan Smith	01	Chevrolet	48.655	184.976	
9	Kyle Busch	18	Toyota	48.694	184.828	
10	Patrick Carpentier	10	Dodge	48.734	184.676	*
11	Travis Kvapil	28	Ford	48.735	184.672	
12	Dave Blaney	22	Toyota	48.740	184.653	
13	A. J. Allmendinger	84	Toyota	48.744	184.638	*
14	Kevin Harvick	29	Chevrolet	48.772	184.532	
15	Denny Hamlin	11	Toyota	48.773	184.528	
16	Casey Mears	5	Chevrolet	48.784	184.487	
17	Tony Stewart	20	Toyota	48.788	184.472	
18	Sterling Marlin	09	Chevrolet	48.791	184.460	*
19	Matt Kenseth	17	Ford	48.799	184.430	
20	Bobby Labonte	43	Dodge	48.810	184.388	
21	Michael McDowell	00	Toyota	48.817	184.362	
22	Jon Wood	21	Ford	48.817	184.362	*
23	Scott Riggs	66	Chevrolet	48.842	184.268	*
24	Jeff Burton	31	Chevrolet	48.857	184.211	
25	Carl Edwards	99	Ford	48.869	184.166	
26	Clint Bowyer	07	Chevrolet	48.869	184.166	
27	Jeff Gordon	24	Chevrolet	48.889	184.090	
28	David Gilliland	38	Ford	48.891	184.083	
29	J. J. Yeley	96	Toyota	48.892	184.079	*
30	Brian Vickers	83	Toyota	48.900	184.049	
31	Michael Waltrip	55	Toyota	48.921	183.970	
32	Jimmie Johnson	48	Chevrolet	48.961	183.820	
33	Juan Pablo Montoya	42	Dodge	48.964	183.809	
34	Ryan Newman	12	Dodge	48.977	183.760	
35	Greg Biffle	16	Ford	48.983	183.737	
36	David Reutimann	44	Toyota	49.013	183.625	
37	Martin Truex Jr.	1	Chevrolet	49.023	183.587	
38	Kurt Busch	2	Dodge	49.035	183.542	
39	Robby Gordon	7	Dodge	49.062	183.441	
40	Elliott Sadler	19	Dodge	49.085	183.355	
41	Reed Sorenson	41	Dodge	49.098	183.307	
42	Jamie McMurray	26	Ford	49.111	183.258	
43	Terry Labonte	45	Dodge	49.127	183.199	PC
44	Kasey Kahne	9	Dodge	49.269	182.671	OP
45	Sam Hornish Jr.	77	Dodge	49.523	181.734	OP

OP: qualified via owners points

PC: qualified as past champion

PR: provisional

QR: via qualifying race

* - had to qualify on time

Failed to qualify, withdrew, or driver changes: Scott Riggs (#66), J. J. Yeley (#96), Dario Franchitti (#40-WD)

== Race recap ==
The biggest news in the event was that Tony Stewart dropped out during a caution in Lap 72 because of flu-like symptoms, and J. J. Yeley took his place in the #20 Toyota. Yeley was on standby after he failed to qualify in the #96 Hall of Fame Racing Toyota.

Also making news was David Reutimann, driver of the Michael Waltrip Racing #44 Toyota, as he tied the record for most consecutive lucky dog free passes in a race between the fourth and eighth of 11 cautions overall, as in each case his car was the first car one lap (or more) down, and as a result, finished 21st.

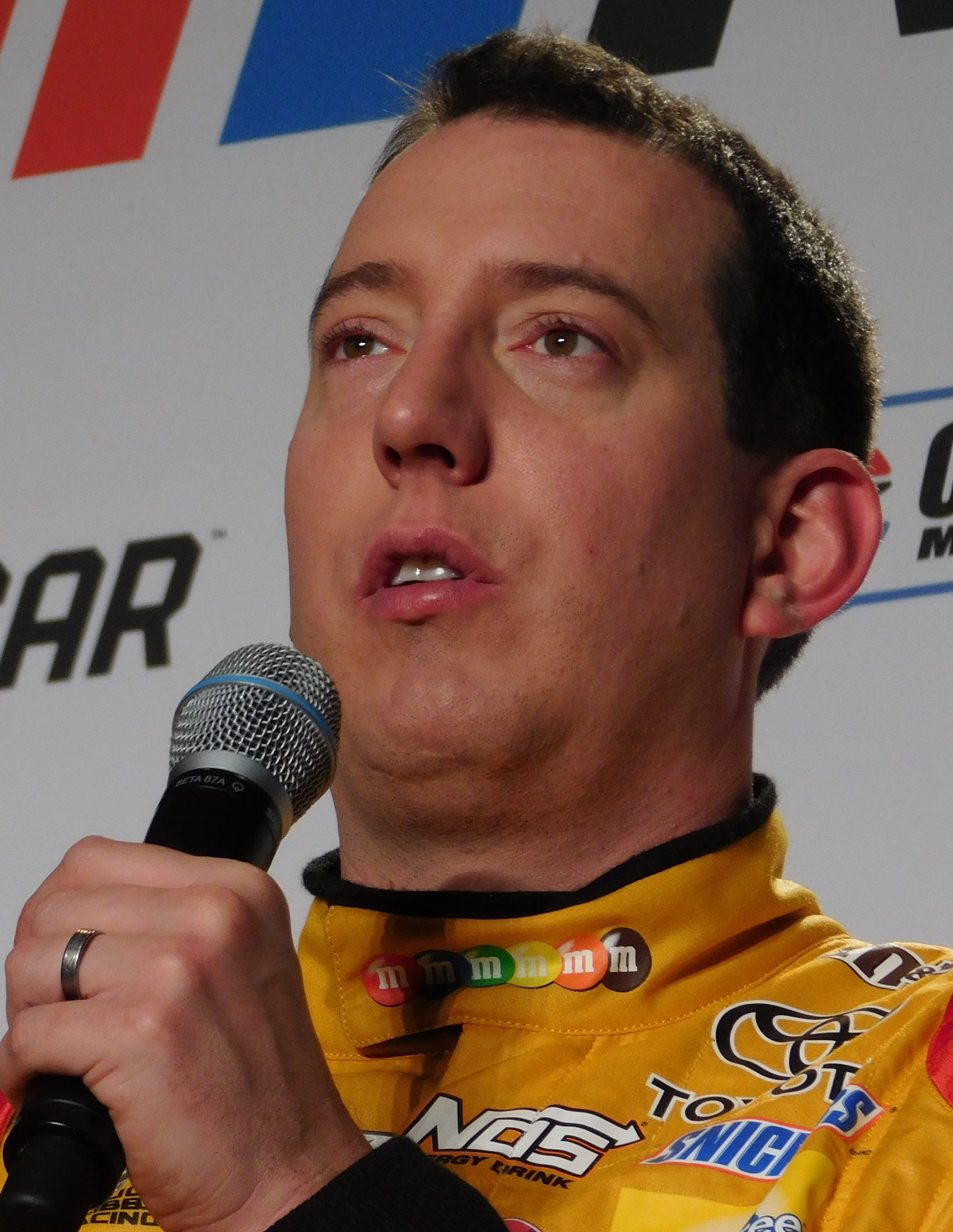
Kyle Busch won the race.

The tenth caution sent the race went to a green–white–checkered finish with four laps remaining. In the first lap of "Checkers or Wreckers", second place driver Jeff Gordon was bumped by Carl Edwards, and spun onto the infield but the green flag stay aloft. However, the second "Big One" occurred on the white flag lap involving Michael Waltrip, Travis Kvapil and Yeley amongst others, and when the yellow light was lit, Kyle Busch, who was as far down as 37th due to a steering wheel problem, was declared the winner over Edwards by 0.026 of a second.

== Results ==
POS	ST	#	DRIVER	OWNER	CAR	LAPS	STATUS	LED	PTS
1	9	18	Kyle Busch	Joe Gibbs	Toyota	162	running	31	190
2	24	99	Carl Edwards	Jack Roush	Ford	162	running	1	175
3	19	17	Matt Kenseth	Jack Roush	Ford	162	running	0	165
4	36	2	Kurt Busch	Roger Penske	Dodge	162	running	0	160
5	6	6	David Ragan	Jack Roush	Ford	162	running	0	155
6	37	7	Robby Gordon	Robby Gordon	Dodge	162	running	1	155
7	41	9	Kasey Kahne	Gillett Evernham Motorsports	Dodge	162	running	0	146
8	3	88	Dale Earnhardt Jr.	Rick Hendrick	Chevrolet	162	running	51	152
9	25	07	Clint Bowyer	Richard Childress	Chevrolet	162	running	0	138
10	2	8	Mark Martin	Dale Earnhardt, Inc.	Chevrolet	162	running	0	134
11	28	83	Brian Vickers	Dietrich Mateschitz	Toyota	162	running	0	130
12	14	29	Kevin Harvick	Richard Childress	Chevrolet	162	running	0	127
13	20	43	Bobby Labonte	Petty Enterprises	Dodge	162	running	0	124
14	10	10	Patrick Carpentier	Gillett Evernham Motorsports	Dodge	162	running	0	121
15	1	15	Paul Menard	Dale Earnhardt, Inc.	Chevrolet	162	running	19	123
16	43	45	Terry Labonte	Petty Enterprises	Dodge	162	running	0	115
17	35	1	Martin Truex Jr.	Dale Earnhardt, Inc.	Chevrolet	162	running	0	-38
18	4	78	Joe Nemechek	Barney Visser	Chevrolet	162	running	0	109
19	12	22	Dave Blaney	Bill Davis	Toyota	162	running	0	106
20	17	20	Tony Stewart (Note: Stewart started the race, but was substituted by J. J. Yeley after Stewart exited the race due to illness. Since Stewart started the race, he is officially credited with the 20th place finish.)	Joe Gibbs	Toyota	162	running	0	103
21	34	44	David Reutimann	Michael Waltrip	Toyota	162	running	0	100
22	39	41	Reed Sorenson	Chip Ganassi	Dodge	162	running	0	97
23	30	48	Jimmie Johnson	Rick Hendrick	Chevrolet	162	running	4	99
24	8	01	Regan Smith	Dale Earnhardt, Inc.	Chevrolet	162	running	0	91
25	21	00	Michael McDowell	Michael Waltrip	Toyota	162	running	0	88
26	15	11	Denny Hamlin	Joe Gibbs	Toyota	162	running	6	90
27	29	55	Michael Waltrip	Michael Waltrip	Toyota	162	running	1	87
28	5	70	Johnny Sauter	Gene Haas	Chevrolet	162	running	0	79
29	42	77	Sam Hornish Jr.	Roger Penske	Dodge	162	running	0	76
30	26	24	Jeff Gordon	Rick Hendrick	Chevrolet	162	running	46	78
31	11	28	Travis Kvapil	Yates Racing	Ford	161	running	0	70
32	40	26	Jamie McMurray	Jack Roush	Ford	157	running	0	67
33	22	21	Jon Wood	Wood Brothers Racing	Ford	155	running	0	64
34	16	5	Casey Mears	Rick Hendrick	Chevrolet	152	running	0	61
35	7	60	Boris Said	Mark Simo	Ford	149	crash	2	63
36	32	12	Ryan Newman	Roger Penske	Dodge	149	running	0	55
37	23	31	Jeff Burton	Richard Childress	Chevrolet	140	crash	0	52
38	31	42	Juan Pablo Montoya	Chip Ganassi	Dodge	132	crash	0	49
39	38	19	Elliott Sadler	Gillett Evernham Motorsports	Dodge	129	running	0	46
40	27	38	David Gilliland	Yates Racing	Ford	124	crash	0	43
41	18	09	Sterling Marlin	James Finch	Chevrolet	103	handling	0	40
42	13	84	A. J. Allmendinger	Dietrich Mateschitz	Toyota	100	running	0	37
43	33	16	Greg Biffle	Jack Roush	Ford	69	crash	0	34

NOTE: Race extended two laps due to green–white–checkered finish.

Failed to Qualify: Scott Riggs (#66) and J. J. Yeley (#96).

Previous race: 2008 Lenox Industrial Tools 301	Sprint Cup Series; 2008 season	Next race: 2008 LifeLock.com 400
