= 2008 Centurion Boats at the Glen =

Race details
- Race 22 of 36 in the 2008 NASCAR Sprint Cup Series season
- 2008 Centurion Boats at the Glen program cover
- Date: August 10, 2008
- Official name: Centurion Boats at the Glen
- Location: Watkins Glen International in Watkins Glen, New York
- Course: Permanent racing facility
- Course length: 2.45 miles (3.942 km)
- Distance: 90 laps, 220.5 mi (354.86 km)
- Weather: Temperatures up to 77 °F (25 °C); wind speeds up to 11.1 miles per hour (17.9 km/h)
- Average speed: 97.148 miles per hour (156.345 km/h)

Pole position
| Driver | Kyle Busch | Joe Gibbs Racing |
- Time: 2008 Owner's Points

Most laps led
| Driver | Kyle Busch | Joe Gibbs Racing |
- Laps: 52

Winner
| No. 18 | Kyle Busch | Joe Gibbs Racing |

Television in the United States
- Network: ESPN
- Announcers: Jerry Punch, Andy Petree and Dale Jarrett

The layout of Watkins Glen International NASCAR uses.

The 2008 Centurion Boats at the Glen was the twenty-second race of the 2008 NASCAR Sprint Cup season and the second and final road course event of the season. The 90-lap, 220.5 miles (354.9 km) race was held on August 10, 2008, at Watkins Glen International Raceway in the New York namesake village. ESPN carried the race at 1 pm EDT and MRN along with Sirius Satellite Radio had radio coverage starting at 1:15 pm EDT.

== Pre-race news ==
- As this event is being held on a road course, several cars are changing drivers to use road course ringers in place of their regular drivers. Among those expected to run at The Glen:
  - Marcos Ambrose will be in the No. 21 Ford Fusion for Wood Brothers Racing;
  - Boris Said was to have brought out the No. 60 Ford for his self-owned No Fear Racing team, and his "teammate" Brian Simo was to have driven the No. 34 Ford, usually raced for Front Row Motorsports as a Chevrolet, however with the cancellation of the qualifying due to rain, neither car made the field;
  - Canadian Ron Fellows, who won the previous week's rain-shortened NASCAR Nationwide Series NAPA Auto Parts 200, will drive the No. 01 Chevy for Dale Earnhardt, Inc. Regan Smith, the usual driver of the No. 01 and a Raybestos Rookie contender, to run a fifth (#81) DEI car for his home race; however, it was announced that the No. 81 car was withdrawn, because Smith had been in 20 races through the Pennsylvania 500.
  - P. J. Jones will be in the No. 96 Toyota Camry for Hall of Fame Racing, replacing J. J. Yeley, who was released. For the rest of the season starting at Michigan, Brad Coleman will take over.
  - Max Papis will race the No. 70 Chevrolet for Haas CNC Racing.
- Kyle Petty was planning to return to the Petty Enterprises No. 45 this week after an absence of nine races - the first due to his daughter's wedding, the next six to be color commentator on TNT, and two following his annual motorcycle charity ride for the Victory Junction Gang camps in North Carolina and Kansas. However, a deal with Boris Said will have him in the car this week.

== Qualifying ==
For the second straight year, qualifying was cancelled due to rain, so the rulebook was used to set the starting field with Kyle Busch starting on pole based on owner's points.

Failed to make race as qualifying was cancelled due to rain: Boris Said (#60) and Brian Simo (#34).

== Recap ==
Kyle Busch set a new NASCAR record with his eighth win of the season, his sixteenth in all three major NASCAR series and swept the road course races by winning. A major accident with eight laps remaining led by Michael McDowell and David Gilliland colliding with one another causing a total of nine cars to be in a wreck. Gilliland hit the tire barrier head on and got hit again 3 more times by Bobby Labonte, Dave Blaney, and by both Max Papis and Joe Nemechek. The wreck also collected Reed Sorenson, Michael Waltrip, and Sam Hornish Jr., who hit the yellow barrels on the entrance of pit road. It also caused Ryan Newman's car to stall but Newman had no damage. The wreck delayed the race under a red flag for 45 minutes. Kyle Busch's win also clinched a spot in the 2008 Chase for the Sprint Cup, which includes the top seed.

== Results ==
| Pos | St | No. | Driver | Car | Laps | Money | Status | Led | Points |
|---|---|---|---|---|---|---|---|---|---|
| 1 | 1 | 18 | Kyle Busch | Toyota | 90 | 227000 | running | 52 | 195 |
| 2 | 9 | 20 | Tony Stewart | Toyota | 90 | 192036 | running | 1 | 175 |
| 3 | 43 | 21 | Marcos Ambrose | Ford | 90 | 141095 | running | 0 | 165 |
| 4 | 25 | 42 | Juan Pablo Montoya | Dodge | 90 | 137983 | running | 2 | 165 |
| 5 | 18 | 1 | Martin Truex Jr. | Chevrolet | 90 | 133783 | running | 0 | 155 |
| 6 | 11 | 29 | Kevin Harvick | Chevrolet | 90 | 134661 | running | 0 | 150 |
| 7 | 4 | 48 | Jimmie Johnson | Chevrolet | 90 | 132236 | running | 2 | 151 |
| 8 | 10 | 11 | Denny Hamlin | Toyota | 90 | 113866 | running | 0 | 142 |
| 9 | 3 | 99 | Carl Edwards | Ford | 90 | 121425 | running | 0 | 138 |
| 10 | 19 | 2 | Kurt Busch | Dodge | 90 | 81225 | running | 0 | 134 |
| 11 | 37 | 84 | A. J. Allmendinger | Toyota | 90 | 74075 | running | 0 | 130 |
| 12 | 13 | 17 | Matt Kenseth | Ford | 90 | 120241 | running | 0 | 127 |
| 13 | 32 | 01 | Ron Fellows | Chevrolet | 90 | 80475 | running | 0 | 124 |
| 14 | 7 | 9 | Kasey Kahne | Dodge | 90 | 100141 | running | 0 | 121 |
| 15 | 22 | 19 | Elliott Sadler | Dodge | 90 | 96520 | running | 0 | 118 |
| 16 | 20 | 26 | Jamie McMurray | Ford | 90 | 76800 | running | 0 | 115 |
| 17 | 5 | 31 | Jeff Burton | Chevrolet | 90 | 109833 | running | 0 | 112 |
| 18 | 17 | 83 | Brian Vickers | Toyota | 90 | 75925 | running | 0 | 109 |
| 19 | 24 | 5 | Casey Mears | Chevrolet | 90 | 81950 | running | 0 | 106 |
| 20 | 39 | 10 | Patrick Carpentier | Dodge | 90 | 67600 | running | 0 | 103 |
| 21 | 8 | 16 | Greg Biffle | Ford | 90 | 75400 | running | 0 | 100 |
| 22 | 2 | 88 | Dale Earnhardt Jr. | Chevrolet | 90 | 74800 | running | 33 | 102 |
| 23 | 12 | 07 | Clint Bowyer | Chevrolet | 90 | 82025 | running | 0 | 94 |
| 24 | 40 | 45 | Boris Said | Dodge | 90 | 84458 | running | 0 | 91 |
| 25 | 36 | 00 | Michael McDowell | Toyota | 90 | 82733 | running | 0 | 88 |
| 26 | 16 | 12 | Ryan Newman | Dodge | 90 | 104700 | running | 0 | 85 |
| 27 | 31 | 7 | Robby Gordon | Dodge | 90 | 87758 | running | 0 | 82 |
| 28 | 27 | 15 | Paul Menard | Chevrolet | 90 | 73350 | running | 0 | 79 |
| 29 | 6 | 24 | Jeff Gordon | Chevrolet | 90 | 111011 | running | 0 | 76 |
| 30 | 14 | 6 | David Ragan | Ford | 90 | 73425 | running | 0 | 73 |
| 31 | 30 | 41 | Reed Sorenson | Dodge | 90 | 91989 | running | 0 | 70 |
| 32 | 34 | 77 | Sam Hornish Jr. | Dodge | 90 | 107125 | running | 0 | 67 |
| 33 | 28 | 44 | David Reutimann | Toyota | 89 | 64850 | running | 0 | 64 |
| 34 | 35 | 66 | Scott Riggs | Chevrolet | 89 | 72933 | running | 0 | 61 |
| 35 | 15 | 8 | Aric Almirola | Chevrolet | 89 | 95283 | running | 0 | 58 |
| 36 | 23 | 28 | Travis Kvapil | Ford | 89 | 88164 | running | 0 | 55 |
| 37 | 38 | 96 | P. J. Jones | Toyota | 89 | 68825 | running | 0 | 52 |
| 38 | 41 | 78 | Joe Nemechek | Chevrolet | 86 | 60650 | crash | 0 | 49 |
| 39 | 33 | 55 | Michael Waltrip | Toyota | 83 | 70072 | running | 0 | 46 |
| 40 | 26 | 38 | David Gilliland | Ford | 81 | 60390 | crash | 0 | 43 |
| 41 | 29 | 22 | Dave Blaney | Toyota | 81 | 60230 | crash | 0 | 40 |
| 42 | 21 | 43 | Bobby Labonte | Dodge | 81 | 97046 | crash | 0 | 37 |
| 43 | 42 | 70 | Max Papis | Chevrolet | 81 | 60373 | crash | 0 | 34 |
Failed to qualify, withdrew, or driver changes:
| Pos | Driver | No. | CAR | | | | | | |
| 44 | Brian Simo | 34 | Chevrolet | | | | | | |
| 45 | Boris Said | 60 | Ford | | | | | | |
| WD | Regan Smith | 81 | Chevrolet | | | | | | |

| Previous race: 2008 Sunoco Red Cross Pennsylvania 500 | Sprint Cup Series; 2008 season | Next race: 2008 3M Performance 400 |
