= 2008 3M Performance 400 =

Race details
- Race 23 of 36 in the 2008 NASCAR Sprint Cup Series season
- 2008 3M Performance 400 program cover
- Date: August 17, 2008
- Official name: 3M Performance 400
- Location: Michigan International Speedway, Brooklyn, Michigan
- Course: Permanent racing facility
- Course length: 2.0 miles (3.218 km)
- Distance: 200 laps, 400 mi (643.737 km)
- Weather: Temperatures reaching up to 84.9 °F (29.4 °C); wind speeds up to 12 miles per hour (19 km/h)
- Average speed: 140.351 miles per hour (225.873 km/h)

Pole position
Driver	Brian Vickers	Red Bull Racing Team
- Time: 38.189

Most laps led
Driver	Carl Edwards	Roush Fenway Racing
- Laps: 84

Winner
No. 99	Carl Edwards	Roush Fenway Racing

Television in the United States
- Network: ESPN
- Announcers: Jerry Punch, Andy Petree and Dale Jarrett

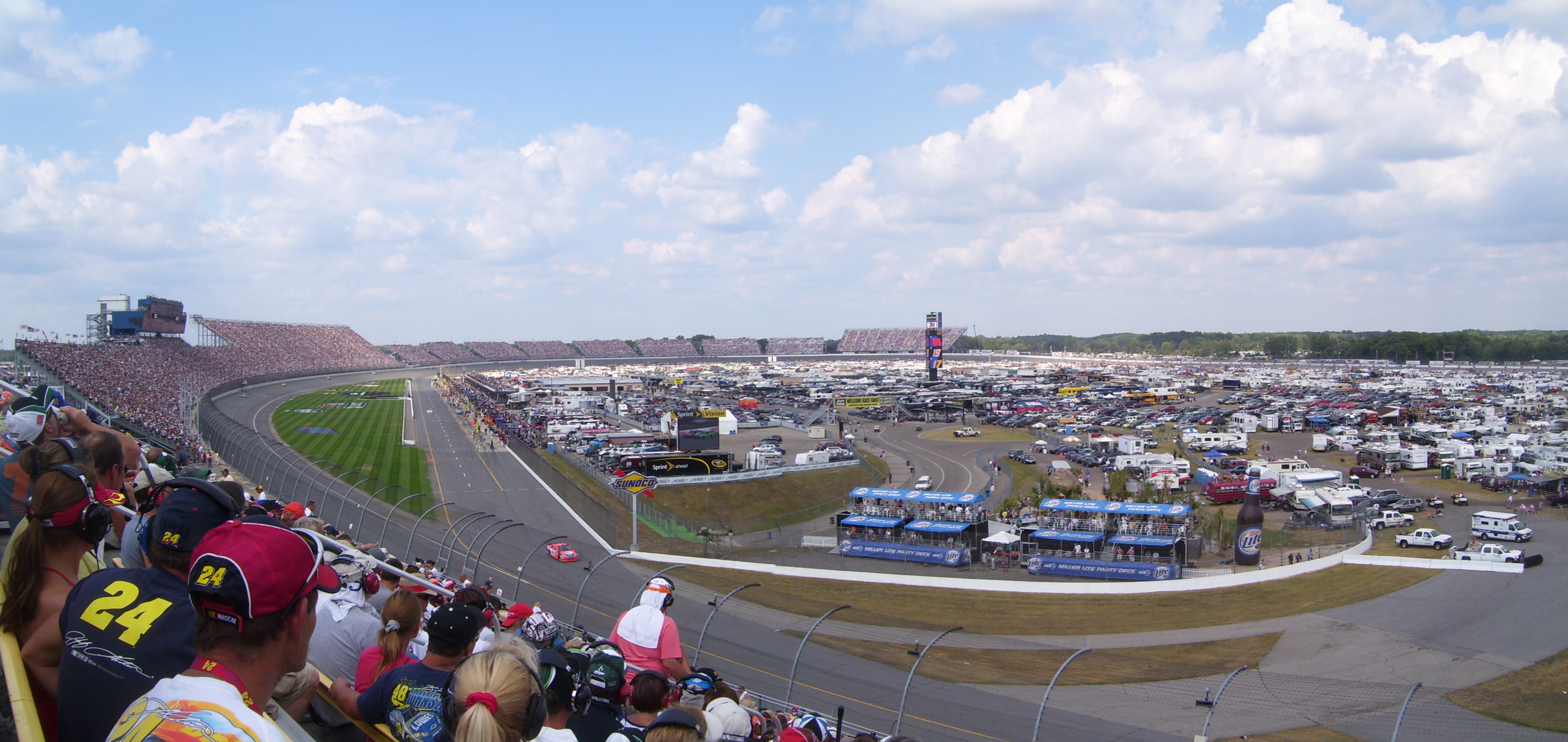
View of Michigan International Speedway, circa 2008

The 2008 3M Performance 400 Presented by Bondo was the twenty-third race of the 2008 NASCAR Sprint Cup season held on August 17 at Michigan International Speedway in Brooklyn, Michigan. ESPN carried the 400 miles (640 km) race beginning at 1 PM US EDT and MRN along with Sirius Satellite Radio had radio coverage starting at 1:15 PM US EDT.

== Pre-Race News ==
- As announced at Watkins Glen last week, Brad Coleman becomes the driver of the #96 Hall of Fame Racing Toyota Camry, replacing J. J. Yeley, who was released. P. J. Jones was at the wheel during the Centurion Boats at the Glen.

== Qualifying ==
Brian Vickers won the first pole for Team Red Bull on August 15. Jimmie Johnson would join him on the front row.

== Race Recap ==
Roush Fenway Racing took four of the top five places, and all five RFR cars were in the top ten as Carl Edwards won the race. Only the Joe Gibbs Racing #18 Toyota driven by points leader Kyle Busch spoiled the parade, finishing second.

== Results ==
POS	ST	#	DRIVER	SPONSOR / OWNER	CAR	LAPS	MONEY	STATUS	LED	PTS
1	27	99	Carl Edwards	Office Depot (Jack Roush)	Ford	200	226075	running	84	195
2	11	18	Kyle Busch	Interstate Batteries (Joe Gibbs)	Toyota	200	136925	running	34	175
3	16	6	David Ragan	AAA Insurance (Jack Roush)	Ford	200	119950	running	3	170
4	9	16	Greg Biffle	3M (Jack Roush)	Ford	200	108700	running	1	165
5	14	17	Matt Kenseth	DeWalt (Jack Roush)	Ford	200	134516	running	0	155
6	15	8	Mark Martin	U.S. Army (Dale Earnhardt, Inc.)	Chevrolet	200	123908	running	0	150
7	1	83	Brian Vickers	Red Bull (Dietrich Mateschitz)	Toyota	200	99800	running	21	151
8	38	29	Kevin Harvick	Shell / Pennzoil (Richard Childress)	Chevrolet	200	134186	running	0	142
9	3	19	Elliott Sadler	Stanley Tools (Gillett Evernham Motorsports)	Dodge	200	117620	running	0	138
10	18	26	Jamie McMurray	Irwin Industrial Tools (Jack Roush)	Ford	200	94900	running	0	134
11	28	31	Jeff Burton	AT&T Mobility (Richard Childress)	Chevrolet	200	123858	running	1	135
12	21	20	Tony Stewart	Home Depot (Joe Gibbs)	Toyota	200	126461	running	0	127
13	26	28	Travis Kvapil	Carfax (Yates Racing)	Ford	200	109489	running	0	124
14	7	44	David Reutimann	UPS (Michael Waltrip)	Toyota	200	85725	running	0	121
15	10	66	Scott Riggs	Haas Automation (Gene Haas)	Chevrolet	200	99433	running	1	123
16	25	1	Martin Truex, Jr.	Bass Pro Shops / Cub Cadet (Dale Earnhardt, Inc.)	Chevrolet	200	110533	running	0	115
17	2	48	Jimmie Johnson	Lowe's / Kobalt Tools (Rick Hendrick)	Chevrolet	200	135386	running	12	117
18	29	5	Casey Mears	Kellogg's / Carquest (Rick Hendrick)	Chevrolet	199	93150	running	0	109
19	42	55	Michael Waltrip	NAPA Auto Parts (Michael Waltrip)	Toyota	199	94608	running	0	106
20	41	07	Clint Bowyer	Jack Daniel's (Richard Childress)	Chevrolet	199	94875	running	0	103
21	20	12	Ryan Newman	Alltel (Roger Penske)	Dodge	199	116625	running	0	100
22	23	77	Sam Hornish, Jr.	Mobil 1 (Roger Penske)	Dodge	199	121125	running	0	97
23	4	88	Dale Earnhardt, Jr.	National Guard / AMP Energy (Rick Hendrick)	Chevrolet	199	91800	running	43	99
24	36	15	Paul Menard	Menards / Moen (Dale Earnhardt, Inc.)	Chevrolet	199	85025	running	0	91
25	19	42	Juan Pablo Montoya	Texaco / Havoline (Chip Ganassi)	Dodge	199	105058	running	0	88
26	40	38	David Gilliland	CitiFinancial (Yates Racing)	Ford	199	90408	running	0	85
27	35	43	Bobby Labonte	Cheerios / Betty Crocker (Petty Enterprises)	Dodge	199	112861	running	0	82
28	33	84	A.J. Allmendinger	Red Bull (Dietrich Mateschitz)	Toyota	199	75675	running	0	79
29	8	01	Regan Smith	DEI / Principal Financial Group (Dale Earnhardt, Inc.)	Chevrolet	199	83500	running	0	76
30	6	10	Patrick Carpentier	Tow Truck In A Box (Gillett Evernham Motorsports)	Dodge	199	72925	running	0	73
31	30	70	Tony Raines	Haas Automation (Gene Haas)	Chevrolet	199	72300	running	0	70
32	17	45	Terry Labonte	Marathon American Spirit Motor Oil (Petty Enterprises)	Dodge	198	86358	running	0	67
33	31	41	Reed Sorenson	Target (Chip Ganassi)	Dodge	198	100289	running	0	64
34	34	78	Joe Nemechek	Furniture Row Racing (Barney Visser)	Chevrolet	198	72025	running	0	61
35	22	00	Mike Skinner	Champion Mortgage (Michael Waltrip)	Toyota	198	81422	running	0	58
36	13	2	Kurt Busch	Miller Lite (Roger Penske)	Dodge	197	71825	running	0	55
37	12	7	Robby Gordon	Jim Beam (Robby Gordon)	Dodge	197	79775	running	0	52
38	43	96	Brad Coleman	DLP HDTV (Jeff Moorad)	Toyota	197	79675	running	0	49
39	37	11	Denny Hamlin	FedEx Office (Joe Gibbs)	Toyota	194	106616	engine	0	46
40	32	9	Kasey Kahne	Budweiser (Gillett Evernham Motorsports)	Dodge	162	101566	engine	0	43
41	24	22	Dave Blaney	Caterpillar (Bill Davis)	Toyota	117	71515	crash	0	40
42	5	24	Jeff Gordon	DuPont (Rick Hendrick)	Chevrolet	111	120376	crash	0	37
43	39	21	Marcos Ambrose	Little Debbie (Wood Brothers)	Ford	17	89252	engine	0	34
Failed to qualify
POS	NAME	NBR	SPONSOR	OWNER	CAR					
44	Johnny Sauter	08	getFUBAR.com	John Carter	Dodge					

Previous race: 2008 Centurion Boats at the Glen	Sprint Cup Series; 2008 season	Next race: 2008 Sharpie 500
