= 2009 Price Chopper 400 =

29th race of 2009 NASCAR Sprint Cup series

2009 Price Chopper 400 presented by Kraft Foods
Race details
- Race 29 of 36 in the 2009 NASCAR Sprint Cup Series
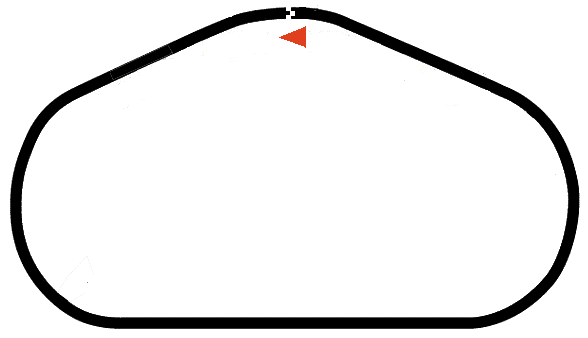
- Date: October 4, 2009
- Location: Kansas Speedway, Kansas City, Kansas
- Course: Permanent racing facility
- Course length: 1.5 miles (2.414 km)
- Distance: 267 laps, 400.5 mi (644.542 km)
- Weather: Temperatures reaching a high of 64.9 °F (18.3 °C); wind speeds approaching 8 miles per hour (13 km/h)
- Average speed: 137.144 miles per hour (220.712 km/h)

Pole position
Driver	Mark Martin	Hendrick Motorsports
- Time: 30.724

Most laps led
Driver	Greg Biffle	Roush Fenway Racing
- Laps: 113

Winner
No. 14	Tony Stewart	Stewart Haas Racing

Television in the United States
- Network: ABC
- Announcers: Jerry Punch, Dale Jarrett, Andy Petree
- Nielsen ratings: 3.2 (Final); 2.6/5 (Overnight); 5.25 million viewers

The 2009 Price Chopper 400 presented by Kraft Foods was the 29th of 36 scheduled stock car races of the 2009 NASCAR Sprint Cup Series and the third in the ten-race season-ending Chase for the Sprint Cup. It was held on October 4, 2009, in Kansas City, Kansas, at Kansas Speedway, before a crowd of 100,000 spectators. Stewart–Haas Racing driver and co-owner Tony Stewart won the 267-lap race, starting from the fifth position. Jeff Gordon of Hendrick Motorsports finished in second, with Roush Fenway Racing's Greg Biffle in third.

Mark Martin won the 47th pole position of his career by posting the fastest lap in qualifying. He lost the lead to his teammate Dale Earnhardt Jr. who passed him on lap 12. Earnhardt kept it until his other teammate Jimmie Johnson emerged in the first position after the first round of green flag pit stops took place. Biffle took the lead for the first time on the 72nd lap, and he led six times for a total of 113 laps, more than any other driver. Stewart became the leader through strategy on lap 238 during a phase of pit stops under a caution period by taking only two tires, while Biffle chose to have four tires installed on his car. He held off the closing Gordon in the final laps to secure the victory. There were six cautions and a track-record 26 lead changes amongst 14 different drivers during the course of the event.

It was Stewart's second win at Kansas Speedway, his fourth of the season, and the 37th of his career. The result advanced him from fifth to fourth in the Drivers' Championship, and past his nearest rival, Penske Championship Racing driver Kurt Busch. He was 67 points behind Martin whose lead over his teammate Johnson was reduced to 18 because Martin finished seventh. Because of Stewart's victory, Chevrolet won its 33rd Manufacturers' Championship in NASCAR Cup Competition, as Toyota could not catch its points total with seven races left in the season. The race attracted 5.25 million television viewers.

== Background ==
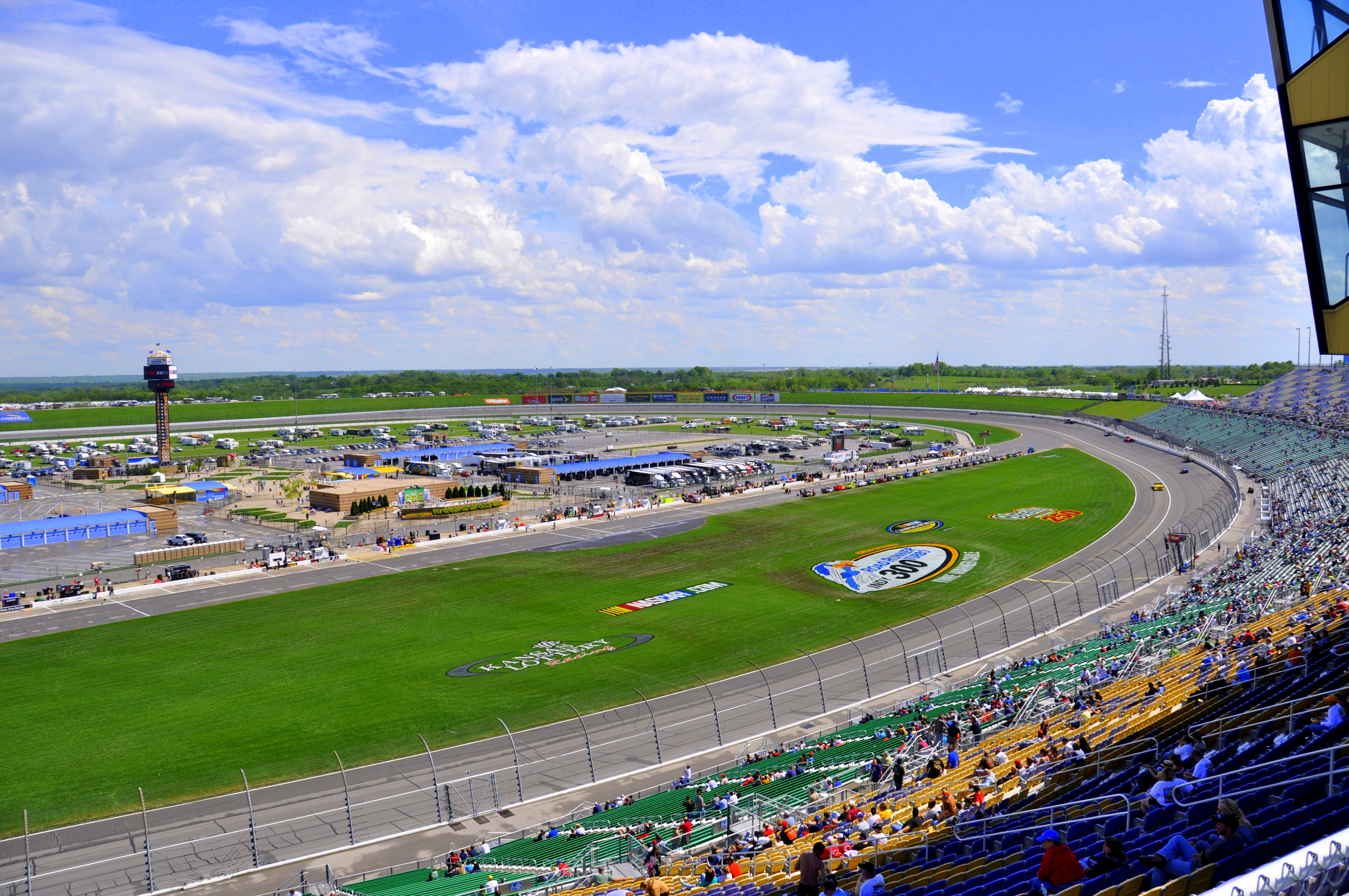
Kansas Speedway, the race track where the race was held.

The 2009 Price Chopper 400 was the twenty-ninth of thirty-six scheduled stock car races of the 2009 NASCAR Sprint Cup Series, and the third in the ten-race season-ending Chase for the Sprint Cup. It was held on October 4, 2009, in Kansas City, Kansas, at Kansas Speedway, an intermediate track that holds NASCAR races. The standard track is a four-turn 1.5 mi (2.4 km) long D-shaped oval track. The track's turns are banked at 15 degrees, while the front stretch, the location of the finish line, is 10.4 degrees. The back stretch, opposite to the front, is five degrees.

Before the race, Mark Martin led the Drivers' Championship with 5,400 points, and Jimmie Johnson stood in second with 5,390. Juan Pablo Montoya was third in the Drivers' Championship with 5,335, ten ahead of Kurt Busch and 21 ahead of Tony Stewart in fourth and fifth. Denny Hamlin was two points ahead of Ryan Newman, as Jeff Gordon with 5,278 points, was 16 ahead of Greg Biffle, and 29 in front of Brian Vickers. Carl Edwards and Kasey Kahne were eleventh and twelfth with 5,247 and 5,211 points. In the Manufacturers' Championship, Chevrolet were leading with 208 points, 45 ahead of their rivals Toyota. Ford, with 123 points, were one point ahead of Dodge in the battle for third place. Johnson was the race's defending champion. The Manufacturers' Championship could have been sealed in Kansas in the event the highest-placed Chevrolet driver finished ahead of the highest-placed Toyota competitor.

== Practice and qualifying ==
Three practice sessions were held before the Sunday race—one on Friday, and two on Saturday. The first session lasted 90 minutes, while the second session lasted 45 minutes. The third and final session lasted 60 minutes. During the first practice session, Newman was fastest, with a time of 31.080 seconds, placing ahead of Johnson in second and Montoya in third. Clint Bowyer was fourth fastest, and David Ragan placed fifth. Tony Stewart, Martin Truex Jr., A. J. Allmendinger, David Stremme and Brad Keselowski rounded out the session's top ten fastest drivers.

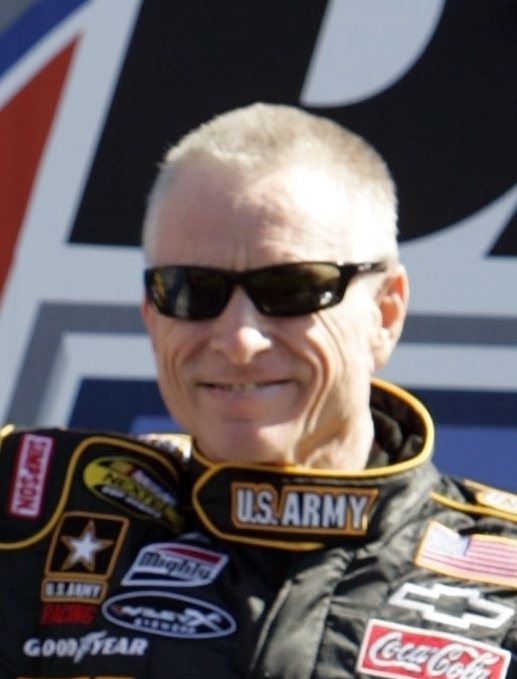
Mark Martin (pictured in 2007) had the 48th pole position of his career.

Forty-six drivers attempted to qualify on Friday afternoon; according to NASCAR's qualifying procedure, forty-three were allowed to race. Each driver ran two laps, with the starting order determined by the competitor's fastest lap times. Hendrick Motorsports and Chevrolet took the first three places as Martin clinched his seventh pole position of the season, his first at Kansas Speedway, and the 48th of his career, with a time of 30.724 seconds. He was joined on the grid's front row by his teammate Dale Earnhardt Jr. whose best lap was 0.084 seconds slower. Keselowski qualified third, Jamie McMurray took fourth, and Stewart started fifth. Kahne, Joe Nemechek, Bowyer, Gordon and Scott Speed completed the top ten positions. The three drivers who failed to qualify were David Gilliland, Michael McDowell and Kevin Hamlin. Once qualifying concluded, Martin said, "Have any of you ever stepped on a cat's tail? I have accidentally stepped on cat's tail before. They make a noise and go really fast. When I stepped on the gas of that No. 5 car today, it was like stepping on a cat's tail it had so much horsepower."

On Saturday morning, Johnson was fastest in the second practice session by setting a lap of 31.144 seconds, ahead of Hamlin in second, and Kenseth in third. Reutimann was fourth quickest, and Stewart took fifth. Joey Logano managed sixth. Bowyer, Gordon, Kurt Busch and Kahne followed in the top ten. Of the drivers in the Chase, Newman set the 12th fastest time, and Biffle was 15th quickest. Later that day, Johnson paced the final practice session with a lap of 31.217 seconds, with Martin in second, and Kenseth in third. Montoya was fourth quickest, and Bowyer took fifth. Gordon managed sixth, Vickers was seventh fastest, Logano eighth, McMurray ninth, and Edwards tenth. Other Chase drivers included Kahne in 12th and Hamlin in 15th.

=== Qualifying results ===
Grid	No.	Driver	Team	Manufacturer	Time	Speed
1	5	Mark Martin	Hendrick Motorsports	Chevrolet	30.724	175.758
2	88	Dale Earnhardt Jr.	Hendrick Motorsports	Chevrolet	30.808	175.279
3	25	Brad Keselowski	Hendrick Motorsports	Chevrolet	30.821	175.205
4	26	Jamie McMurray	Roush Fenway Racing	Ford	30.822	175.199
5	14	Tony Stewart	Stewart–Haas Racing	Chevrolet	30.850	175.040
6	9	Kasey Kahne	Richard Petty Motorsports	Dodge	30.860	174.984
7	87	Joe Nemechek	NEMCO Motorsports	Toyota	30.895	174.786
8	33	Clint Bowyer	Richard Childress Racing	Chevrolet	30.902	174.746
9	24	Jeff Gordon	Hendrick Motorsports	Chevrolet	30.908	174.712
10	82	Scott Speed	Red Bull Racing Team	Toyota	30.918	174.656
11	48	Jimmie Johnson	Hendrick Motorsports	Chevrolet	30.923	174.627
12	83	Brian Vickers	Red Bull Racing Team	Toyota	30.926	174.610
13	00	David Reutimann	Michael Waltrip Racing	Toyota	30.932	174.577
14	42	Juan Pablo Montoya	Earnhardt Ganassi Racing	Chevrolet	30.934	174.565
15	44	A. J. Allmendinger	Richard Petty Motorsports	Dodge	30.943	174.514
16	21	Bill Elliott	Wood Brothers Racing	Ford	30.996	174.216
17	99	Carl Edwards	Roush Fenway Racing	Ford	31.015	174.109
18	20	Joey Logano	Joe Gibbs Racing	Toyota	31.015	174.109
19	09	Mike Bliss	Phoenix Racing	Dodge	31.060	173.857
20	98	Paul Menard	Yates Racing	Ford	31.071	173.796
21	1	Martin Truex Jr.	Earnhardt Ganassi Racing	Chevrolet	31.076	173.768
22	11	Denny Hamlin	Joe Gibbs Racing	Toyota	31.084	173.723
23	17	Matt Kenseth	Roush Fenway Racing	Ford	31.120	173.522
24	66	Dave Blaney	Prism Motorsports	Toyota	31.129	173.472
25	6	David Ragan	Roush Fenway Racing	Ford	31.146	173.377
26	71	Bobby Labonte	TRG Motorsports	Chevrolet	31.151	173.349
27	47	Marcos Ambrose	JTG Daugherty Racing	Toyota	31.163	173.282
28	43	Reed Sorenson	Richard Petty Motorsports	Dodge	31.164	173.277
29	55	Michael Waltrip	Michael Waltrip Racing	Toyota	31.192	173.121
30	39	Ryan Newman	Stewart–Haas Racing	Chevrolet	31.196	173.099
31	16	Greg Biffle	Roush Fenway Racing	Ford	31.203	173.060
32	12	David Stremme	Penske Championship Racing	Dodge	31.214	172.999
33	77	Sam Hornish Jr.	Penske Championship Racing	Dodge	31.269	172.695
34	18	Kyle Busch	Joe Gibbs Racing	Toyota	31.310	172.469
35	31	Jeff Burton	Richard Childress Racing	Chevrolet	31.318	172.425
36	07	Casey Mears	Richard Childress Racing	Chevrolet	31.368	172.150
37	7	Robby Gordon	Robby Gordon Motorsports	Toyota	31.388	172.040
38	29	Kevin Harvick	Richard Childress Racing	Chevrolet	31.408	171.931
39	2	Kurt Busch	Penske Championship Racing	Dodge	31.554	171.135
40	34	John Andretti	Front Row Motorsports	Chevrolet	31.640	170.690
41	96	Erik Darnell	Hall of Fame Racing	Ford	31.704	170.326
42	19	Elliott Sadler	Richard Petty Motorsports	Dodge	31.731	170.181
43	13	Max Papis	Germain Racing	Toyota	31.281	172.629
Failed to qualify
44	04	David Gilliland	Robby Gordon Motorsports	Toyota	31.324	172.392
45	36	Michael McDowell	Tommy Baldwin Racing	Toyota	31.557	171.119
46	37	Kevin Hamlin	Front Row Motorsports	Dodge	31.732	170.176

== Race ==
Live television coverage of the race began in the United States at 2:00 p.m. EDT (UTC−05:00) on ABC. Around the start of the race, weather conditions were sunny, with the air temperature 56 °F (13 °C). Pastor Jimmy Ybarra began pre-race ceremonies by giving the invocation. Country music singer Blaine Larsen performed the national anthem, and the Grand Marshal of the race Kent Blair commanded the drivers to start their engines.

Martin retained his pole position lead into the first corner, with Earnhardt behind him. Keselowski fell to the sixth position on the same lap. On lap two, Logano lost control of his car, and spun sideways off the track at turn two, causing the first caution. All of the leaders stayed out on track, allowing Martin to remain the leader on the restart. On lap 6, McMurray passed Earnhardt to claim the second position. One lap later, the second caution was prompted after Paul Menard spun sideways at turn two, collecting Ragan, Michael Waltrip, Max Papis, and Bobby Labonte. During the caution, most of the leaders elected to make pit stops. Martin maintained his lead on the restart, with Earnhardt in second, and Keselowski third. On the 12th lap, Earnhardt moved into the first position after passing his teammate Martin at turn four. Keselowski overtook Martin shortly after. One lap later, Ragan drove to pit road after smoke billowed from his car.

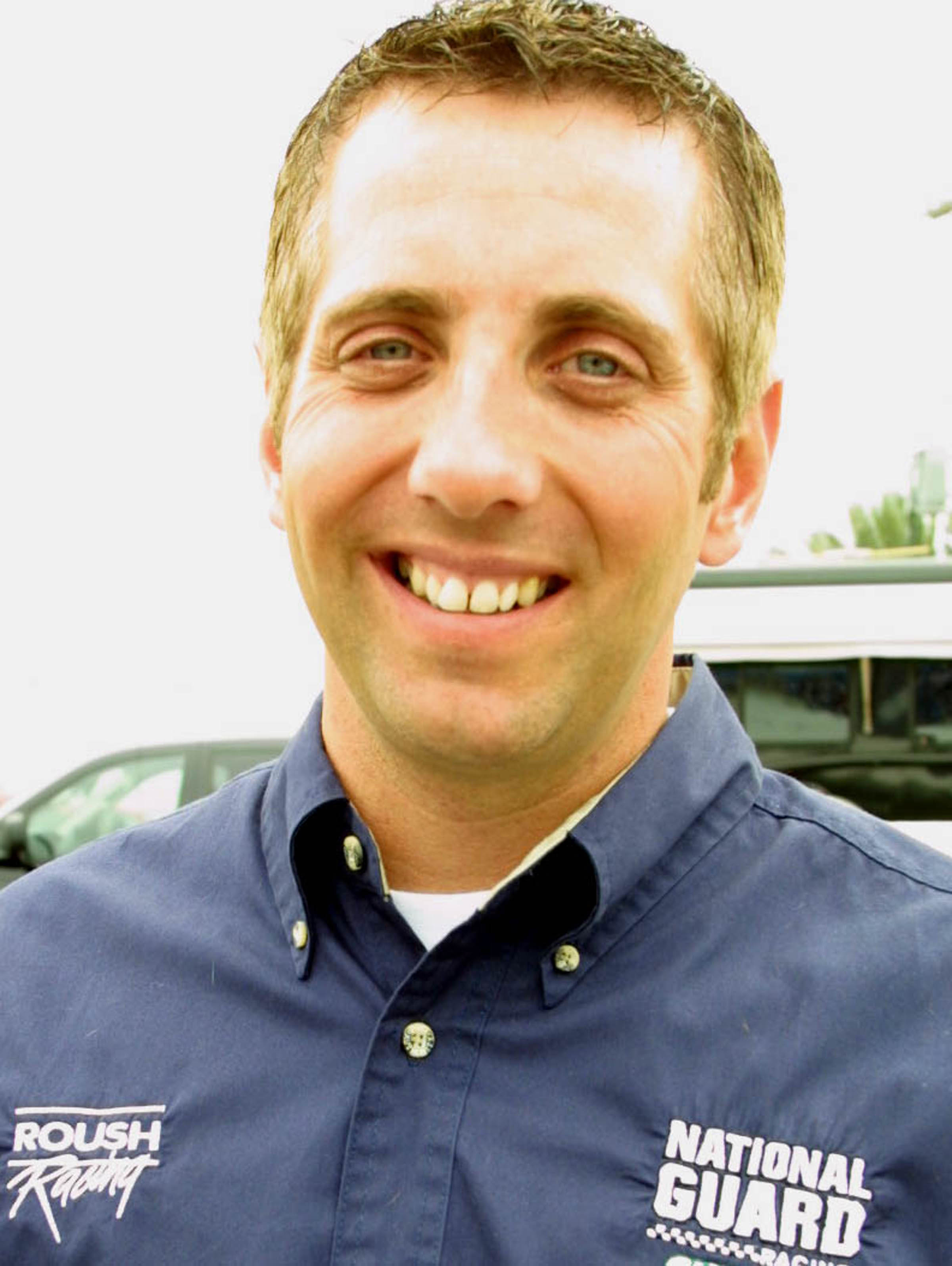
Greg Biffle (pictured in 2004) led more laps than any other driver, 113, but finished third after an incorrect tire strategy.

On lap 15, Johnson passed Reutimann for eighth. After starting the race in 22nd, Hamlin had moved up eleven positions to eleventh by lap 18. One lap later, Johnson passed Gordon for seventh, as Montoya moved into the tenth position by lap 20. On the 21st lap, Johnson claimed the sixth position from Kahne, while Montoya passed Gordon for eighth. By lap 23, Earnhardt had a 1.9 second lead over Keselowski. Two laps later, McMurray passed Martin for the third position. By lap 31, Johnson had moved into the fourth position after passing Stewart and Martin. Four laps later, Stewart moved into fifth after passing Martin. On the 37th lap, Johnson passed McMurray for third. Stewart and Martin got ahead of McMurray to take over the fourth and fifth positions three laps later. Reuitmann got into sixth by the 45th lap. Two laps later, Gordon fell to 12th because of handling difficulties.

On lap 48, Montoya was overtaken by Biffle for the eighth position, and Reuitmann got ahead of Martin on the outside lane to take fifth on the backstretch. Green flag pit stops commenced on lap 52 as Keselowski became the first driver to stop for an air pressure adjustment and tires. They lasted until the 62nd lap, and Johnson took the lead after their conclusion with Keselowski second, and Stewart in third. Seven laps later, the third caution was necessitated for Reed Sorenson who hit the turn two wall. During the caution, several drivers (including Johnson), elected to make pit stops for tires. Biffle won the race off pit road, and lead at the restart on lap 75. Kenseth was passed by Montoya for second on lap 76, and Keselowski and Kurt Busch battled for fourth place. On lap 88, Johnson caught the leader Biffle and they battled alongside each other for the next few laps.

Johnson drew ahead of Biffle as the pair crossed the start/finish line to lead the 91st lap, as Stewart got past Truex for the third position. Johnson and Biffle continued to trade the lead for the next three laps, as they extended their advantage over the rest of the pack to five seconds. By lap 97, Gordon had advanced to eighth. On the next lap, Montoya passed Truex to take over fifth. Biffle was delayed the slower car of Papis, and Johnson took the opportunity to get ahead of him, and retake the lead on the 102nd lap. Kenseth got ahead of Truex to demote him to eighth two laps later. By the 119th lap, Montoya was in fourth, and Keselowski was passed by Kenseth for the fifth position. The second round of green flag pit stops for tires and car adjustments got underway on lap 122. Four laps later, Vickers spun leaving turn four, and the fourth caution was shown. Pit stops continued to be made during the caution.

Biffle got ahead of Johnson as his pit stop was faster than his and led the field at the lap 131 restart. On the next lap, Johnson re-passed Biffle around the outside in the third turn to reclaim the lead. After starting 22nd, Hamlin moved into sixth unnoticed by lap 132. Nine laps later, Montoya overtook Biffle to take the second position, as Johnson increased his lead over Biffle to 4.4 seconds. Elliott Sadler pirouetted through 360 degrees in turn two, but avoided contact with the wall and passing vehicles on lap 147, activating the fifth caution. Under caution, all of the leaders (including Johnson) went to pit road for tires and car adjustments. Biffle regained the lead, and held the position at the lap 152 restart. Hamlin overtook Martin for second place soon after. Three laps later, Gordon passed Martin for fourth, and Marcos Ambrose lost the tenth position to Kahne. Biffle then held off Stewart to keep the lead on the 159th lap, and that allowed Hamlin to close up.

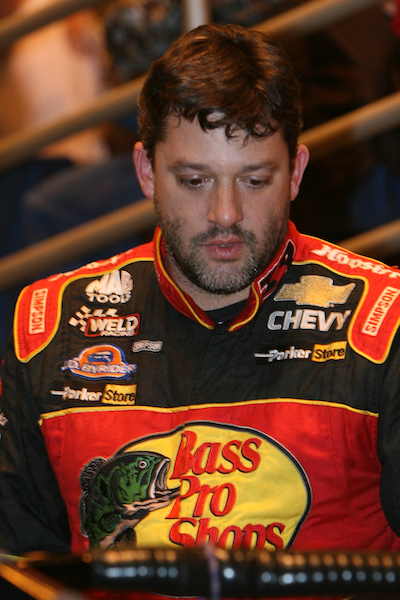
Tony Stewart (pictured in 2008) won his 37th career victory after holding off Jeff Gordon in the final laps of the event.

On the 163rd lap, Johnson got ahead of Kyle Busch to take the tenth position, and Casey Mears was passed by Montoya who took sixth from him two laps later. Johnson advanced to ninth by passing Reutimann on lap 166. Mears fell to eighth when Kahne overtook him on the following lap. Montoya got past Martin for fifth on lap 169. After ending their battle for first place, Biffle and Stewart increased their advantage over the rest of the pack to three seconds. On the 171st lap, Johnson got into seventh when he overtook Mears and Kahne moved into sixth six laps later. Kurt Busch got ahead of Mears to claim the tenth position on lap 180. The third phase of green flag pit stops for fuel, tires, and car adjustments occurred between laps 183 and 209, with Biffle maintaining the lead and Stewart keeping second. On lap 212, Montoya's crew chief Brian Pattie requested he conserve fuel so he could try to finish the race.

Hamlin overtook Gordon to advance into fourth on lap 213. By lap 217, Biffle had a lead of 7.8 seconds but he had to make another pit stop before the race would conclude. Hamlin got ahead of Kahne to claim third place three laps later. Between laps 221 and 223, Johnson, Gordon and Montoya battled for third but neither driver could advance their positions. On the 230th lap, Martin passed Montoya for seventh. The sixth (and final) caution came out as Earnhardt's engine failed, and oil from his car laid on the track. He brought his into the garage to retire from the race. During the caution, the leaders (including Biffle), elected to make pit stops for fuel and tires. Biffle requested four tires be installed on his car after he overruled his crew chief Greg Erwin's decision to have two tires fitted. Stewart, meanwhile, had two tires installed, and exited pit road as the new race leader on lap 238.

Stewart maintained the lead at the lap 242 restart, followed by Kahne, Johnson, Biffle and Hamlin. Biffle then passed Kahne and Johnson to move into second, as Stewart opened up a healthy advantage. In the meantime, Johnson fell to sixth as he struggled with his two new tires. Five laps later, Hamlin went to the track's apron to pass Kahne and Montoya for the fourth position. Johnson was passed by his teammate Martin for eighth on the 248th lap. Gordon caught Biffle and got ahead of him for second six laps later. Although Gordon reduced Stewart's lead, it was not enough for him to challenge the latter, as Stewart responded to Gordon's pace, and took his second win at Kansas Speedway, his fourth of the season, and the 37th of his career. Gordon finished second, Biffle came third, Montoya took fourth and Hamlin fifth. Kahne, Martin, Reuitmann, Johnson and Edwards completed the top ten finishers. The race had a track-record 26 lead changes amongst 14 different drivers. Biffle led six times for a total of 113 laps, more than any other driver. Stewart led five times for a total of 37 laps.

=== Post-race ===
Stewart appeared in Victory Lane to celebrate his fourth victory of the season in front of a crowd of 100,000 people; the win earned him $332,498. He credited his crew chief Darian Grubb for a strategy that allowed him to take the lead, "The guys that took four could just never gain the track position back. We had a really good car on two tyres. Darian and these guys on the pit crew, they are the ones that got us the win. They got us track position and I was able to pick which line I wanted on the restart and that won us the race." Gordon explained that his car became harder to handle the closer he got to Stewart, "As long as he didn't make any big mistakes, I wasn't going to catch him.", and also admitted to have selected the wrong tire strategy, "I know what I did was wrong. I know I made a mistake. But we're sure excited to be running good again, especially going to some tracks we like, like California." Third-placed Johnson said of his situation in the championship and the loss of a victory, "I hate losing points, I felt like we had a shot to win the race, it's just way too early, for myself, even to start worrying about [the Chase standings.] It's only three races in."

Grubb commented on Stewart's victory, "Tony was able to get out there in clean air and was able to take off. The other guys who took two [tyres] ended up 7th and 9th. So Tony was able to get that clean air and just take off. He did an awesome job today; the entire pit crew and everybody did an awesome job all day long." Although he finished seventh, Martin said he was pleased with the result as he was able to keep the points lead, "This is the first time we missed it that much in a while. There have been times when I was off this much and finish 25th. But our team fought for everything we got today." However, he was not celebratory as he was unsure whether he could keep his advantage in the next few races, "What is there, seven more to go? I don't think we should be getting all hyped up about the tally right now, you know? We've got a lot of racing to go."

After the race, Johnson's and Martin's cars were transported to NASCAR's Research and Development Center in Concord, North Carolina for a further precautionary inspection because those two vehicles had been close to exceeding to the organizing body's measurement tolerance limits at the previous week's race at Dover International Speedway. After personnel from Hendrick Motorsports were allowed to observe the potential issues to the two cars, both passed their inspections. The race results left Martin with the Drivers' Championship lead with 5,551 points. Martin's teammate Johnson was 18 points behind in second, and Montoya kept third with 5,500 points. Stewart's win allowed him to move past Kurt Busch and advance into the fourth position. Hamlin, Gordon, Biffle, Newman, Edwards, Kahne, and Vickers completed the top twelve drivers in the points standings. Because of Stewart's victory, Chevrolet won its seventh Manufacturers' Championship in a row, and its 33rd in NASCAR Cup Series competition. Toyota maintained second with 167 points. Ford moved four points clear of Dodge in the battle for third with seven races left in the season. The race attracted 5.25 million television viewers; it took two hours, 55 minutes, and 13 seconds to complete, and the margin of victory was 0.894 seconds.

=== Race results ===
Pos.	Grid	No.	Driver	Team	Manufacturer	Laps	Points
1	5	14	Tony Stewart	Stewart–Haas Racing	Chevrolet	267	190^{1}
2	9	24	Jeff Gordon	Hendrick Motorsports	Chevrolet	267	170
3	31	16	Greg Biffle	Roush Fenway Racing	Ford	267	175^{2}
4	14	42	Juan Pablo Montoya	Earnhardt Ganassi Racing	Dodge	267	165^{1}
5	22	11	Denny Hamlin	Joe Gibbs Racing	Toyota	267	160^{1}
6	6	9	Kasey Kahne	Richard Petty Motorsports	Dodge	267	150
7	1	5	Mark Martin	Hendrick Motorsports	Chevrolet	267	151^{1}
8	13	00	David Reutimann	Michael Waltrip Racing	Toyota	267	142
9	11	48	Jimmie Johnson	Hendrick Motorsports	Chevrolet	267	143^{1}
10	17	99	Carl Edwards	Roush Fenway Racing	Ford	267	139^{1}
11	39	2	Kurt Busch	Penske Championship Racing	Dodge	267	135^{1}
12	34	18	Kyle Busch	Joe Gibbs Racing	Toyota	267	127
13	3	25	Brad Keselowski	Hendrick Motorsports	Chevrolet	267	129^{1}
14	27	47	Marcos Ambrose	JTG Daugherty Racing	Toyota	267	121
15	36	07	Casey Mears	Richard Petty Motorsports	Dodge	267	118
16	21	1	Martin Truex Jr.	Earnhardt Ganassi Racing	Chevrolet	267	120^{1}
17	15	44	A. J. Allmendinger	Richard Petty Motorsports	Dodge	267	112
18	33	77	Sam Hornish Jr.	Penske Championship Racing	Dodge	267	109
19	16	21	Bill Elliott	Wood Brothers Racing	Ford	266	106
20	42	19	Elliott Sadler	Richard Petty Motorsports	Dodge	266	108^{1}
21	42	33	Clint Bowyer	Richard Childress Racing	Chevrolet	266	100
22	30	39	Ryan Newman	Stewart–Haas Racing	Chevrolet	266	97
23	35	31	Jeff Burton	Richard Childress Racing	Chevrolet	266	94
24	38	29	Kevin Harvick	Richard Childress Racing	Chevrolet	266	91
25	32	12	David Stremme	Penske Championship Racing	Dodge	266	88
26	28	43	Reed Sorenson	Richard Petty Motorsports	Dodge	266	85
27	10	82	Scott Speed	Red Bull Racing Team	Toyota	266	82
28	18	20	Joey Logano	Joe Gibbs Racing	Toyota	266	79
29	41	96	Erik Darnell	Hall of Fame Racing	Ford	265	76
30	20	98	Paul Menard	Yates Racing	Ford	265	73
31	4	26	Jamie McMurray	Roush Fenway Racing	Ford	264	70
32	43	13	Max Papis	Germain Racing	Toyota	263	67
33	40	34	John Andretti	Front Row Motorsports	Chevrolet	263	69^{1}
34	37	7	Robby Gordon	Robby Gordon Motorsports	Toyota	263	61
35	25	6	David Ragan	Roush Fenway Racing	Ford	256	58
36	2	88	Dale Earnhardt Jr.	Hendrick Motorsports	Chevrolet	232	60^{1}
37	12	83	Brian Vickers	Red Bull Racing Team	Toyota	208	52
38	29	55	Michael Waltrip	Michael Waltrip Racing	Toyota	141	49
39	23	17	Matt Kenseth	Roush Fenway Racing	Ford	134	51^{1}
40	24	66	Dave Blaney	Prism Motorsports	Toyota	28	43
41	19	09	Mike Bliss	Phoenix Racing	Dodge	26	40
42	7	87	Joe Nemechek	NEMCO Motorsports	Toyota	25	37
43	26	71	Bobby Labonte	TRG Motorsports	Chevrolet	6	34
^{1} Includes five bonus points for leading a lap
^{2} Includes ten bonus points for leading the most laps

== Standings after the race ==
Drivers' Championship standings

Pos	+/–	Driver	Points
1		Mark Martin	5,551
2		Jimmie Johnson	5,533 (−18)
3		Juan Pablo Montoya	5,500 (−51)
4	1	Tony Stewart	5,484 (−67)
5	1	Kurt Busch	5,460 (−91)
6		Denny Hamlin	5,452 (−99)
7	1	Jeff Gordon	5,448 (−103)
8	1	Greg Biffle	5,437 (−114)
9	2	Ryan Newman	5,387 (−164)
10	1	Carl Edwards	5,386 (−165)
11	1	Kasey Kahne	5,361 (−190)
12	2	Brian Vickers	5,301 (−250)

Manufacturers' Championship standings

Pos	+/–	Manufacturer	Points
1		Chevrolet	217
2		Toyota	167 (−50)
3		Ford	129 (−58)
4		Dodge	125 (−92)

- Note: Only the top twelve positions are included for the driver standings.

Previous race: 2009 AAA 400	Sprint Cup Series; 2009 season	Next race: 2009 Pepsi 500
