= 2008 Brickyard 400 =

2008 Allstate 400 at the Brickyard
Race details
- Race 20 of 36 in the 2008 NASCAR Sprint Cup Series season
- 2008 Brickyard 400 program cover
- Date: July 27, 2008
- Official name: Allstate 400 at the Brickyard
- Location: Indianapolis Motor Speedway in Speedway, Indiana
- Course: Permanent racing facility
- Course length: 2.5 miles (4.023 km)
- Distance: 160 laps, 400 mi (643.737 km)
- Weather: Hot with temperatures approaching 88 °F (31 °C); wind speeds up to 9.9 miles per hour (15.9 km/h)
- Average speed: 115.117 miles per hour (185.263 km/h)
- Attendance: 240,000

Pole position
Driver	Jimmie Johnson	Hendrick Motorsports
- Time: 49.515

Most laps led
Driver	Jimmie Johnson	Hendrick Motorsports
- Laps: 71

Winner
No. 48	Jimmie Johnson	Hendrick Motorsports

Television in the United States
- Network: ESPN
- Announcers: Jerry Punch, Andy Petree and Dale Jarrett

The 2008 Allstate 400 at the Brickyard, the 15th running of the event, was the twentieth race of the 2008 NASCAR Sprint Cup season and the fifteenth NASCAR race at the Indianapolis Motor Speedway (IMS). It was also the first race under the ESPN/ABC section of the TV coverage for the 2008 season. The 160-lap, 400 miles (640 km) event was raced on July 27 at the 2.5 miles (4.0 km) Indianapolis Motor Speedway located in Speedway, Indiana (a separate town surrounded by Indiana's state capital). Along with ESPN, the IMS Radio Network, working with Performance Racing Network, provided radio coverage (along with Sirius Satellite Radio) with both broadcasts starting at 1 PM US EDT.

The race was deemed a "disaster" for NASCAR, Goodyear, and Indianapolis. Due to the new Car of Tomorrow, the surface at the Indianapolis Motor Speedway, and problems with Goodyear tires, NASCAR was forced to throw competition cautions every 10–12 laps; an average of just 9 green flag laps were run during the race. Tires started to explode if the race was allowed to continue past that distance. Even at that distance, tires were down to the cords/nylon base. At the end of the race, every tire that Goodyear had brought to the track for the weekend had been used and were no longer usable.

The race was starting to rival the Daytona 500 in terms of the biggest race of the NASCAR season before the tire problems at this race. Since this race, attendance has dropped from a 257,000+ sell out to an estimated 100,000 at the 2010 race. By the 2013 race, the last year NASCAR tracked attendance, it dropped to 70,000.

== Entry list ==
- (W) denotes past Brickyard 400 winner.
- (R) denotes rookie driver.

No.	Driver	Team	Manufacturer
00	Michael McDowell (R)	Michael Waltrip Racing	Toyota
01	Regan Smith (R)	Dale Earnhardt Inc.	Chevrolet
1	Martin Truex Jr.	Dale Earnhardt Inc.	Chevrolet
2	Kurt Busch	Penske Racing South	Dodge
5	Casey Mears	Hendrick Motorsports	Chevrolet
6	David Ragan	Roush Fenway Racing	Ford
07	Clint Bowyer	Richard Childress Racing	Chevrolet
7	Robby Gordon	Robby Gordon Motorsports	Dodge
08	Johnny Sauter	E&M Motorsports	Dodge
8	Mark Martin	Dale Earnhardt Inc.	Chevrolet
9	Kasey Kahne	Gillett Evernham Motorsports	Dodge
10	Patrick Carpentier (R)	Gillett Evernham Motorsports	Dodge
11	Denny Hamlin	Joe Gibbs Racing	Toyota
12	Ryan Newman	Penske Racing South	Dodge
15	Paul Menard	Dale Earnhardt Inc.	Chevrolet
16	Greg Biffle	Roush Fenway Racing	Ford
17	Matt Kenseth	Roush Fenway Racing	Ford
18	Kyle Busch	Joe Gibbs Racing	Toyota
19	Elliott Sadler	Gillett Evernham Motorsports	Dodge
20	Tony Stewart (W)	Joe Gibbs Racing	Toyota
21	Bill Elliott (W)	Wood Brothers Racing	Ford
22	Dave Blaney	Bill Davis Racing	Toyota
24	Jeff Gordon (W)	Hendrick Motorsports	Chevrolet
26	Jamie McMurray	Roush Fenway Racing	Ford
28	Travis Kvapil	Yates Racing	Ford
29	Kevin Harvick (W)	Richard Childress Racing	Chevrolet
31	Jeff Burton	Richard Childress Racing	Chevrolet
34	Tony Raines	Front Row Motorsports	Chevrolet
38	David Gilliland	Yates Racing	Ford
41	Reed Sorenson	Chip Ganassi Racing	Dodge
42	Juan Pablo Montoya	Chip Ganassi Racing	Dodge
43	Bobby Labonte (W)	Petty Enterprises	Dodge
44	David Reutimann	Michael Waltrip Racing	Toyota
45	Terry Labonte	Petty Enterprises	Dodge
47	Marcos Ambrose	JTG Racing	Ford
48	Jimmie Johnson (W)	Hendrick Motorsports	Chevrolet
50	Stanton Barrett	SKI Motorsports	Chevrolet
55	Michael Waltrip	Michael Waltrip Racing	Toyota
66	Scott Riggs	Haas CNC Racing	Chevrolet
70	Jason Leffler	Haas CNC Racing	Chevrolet
77	Sam Hornish Jr. (R)	Penske Racing South	Dodge
78	Joe Nemechek	Furniture Row Racing	Chevrolet
83	Brian Vickers	Team Red Bull	Toyota
84	A. J. Allmendinger	Team Red Bull	Toyota
88	Dale Earnhardt Jr.	Hendrick Motorsports	Chevrolet
96	J. J. Yeley	Hall of Fame Racing	Toyota
99	Carl Edwards	Roush Fenway Racing	Ford

== Qualifying ==
Jimmie Johnson held off Mark Martin to win the pole position. Bill Elliott, after starting the first 14 races at Indianapolis Motor Speedway, failed in his final run to do so, as he retired following the season.

RANK	DRIVER	NBR	CAR	TIME	SPEED	
1	Jimmie Johnson	48	Chevrolet	49.515	181.763	
2	Mark Martin	8	Chevrolet	49.616	181.393	
3	Ryan Newman	12	Dodge	49.732	180.970	
4	Kasey Kahne	9	Dodge	49.776	180.810	
5	Jeff Gordon	24	Chevrolet	49.849	180.545	
6	Elliott Sadler	19	Dodge	49.890	180.397	
7	Kurt Busch	2	Dodge	49.905	180.343	
8	Jamie McMurray	26	Ford	49.911	180.321	
9	Carl Edwards	99	Ford	49.942	180.209	
10	Matt Kenseth	17	Ford	50.023	179.917	
11	Dale Earnhardt Jr.	88	Chevrolet	50.038	179.863	
12	Greg Biffle	16	Ford	50.067	179.759	
13	Juan Pablo Montoya	42	Dodge	50.084	179.698	
14	Tony Stewart	20	Toyota	50.145	179.480	
15	Patrick Carpentier	10	Dodge	50.146	179.476	*
16	David Ragan	6	Ford	50.261	179.065	
17	Brian Vickers	83	Toyota	50.303	178.916	
18	Kevin Harvick	29	Chevrolet	50.319	178.859	
19	Kyle Busch	18	Toyota	50.345	178.767	
20	David Gilliland	38	Ford	50.447	178.405	
21	Jason Leffler	70	Chevrolet	50.467	178.334	*
22	Reed Sorenson	41	Dodge	50.511	178.179	
23	Denny Hamlin	11	Toyota	50.514	178.168	
24	Marcos Ambrose	47	Ford	50.524	178.133	*
25	Martin Truex Jr.	1	Chevrolet	50.568	177.978	
26	A.J. Allmendinger	84	Toyota	50.581	177.932	*
27	Bobby Labonte	43	Dodge	50.594	177.887	
28	Travis Kvapil	28	Ford	50.622	177.788	
29	Robby Gordon	7	Dodge	50.676	177.599	
30	Michael McDowell	00	Toyota	50.678	177.592	
31	Casey Mears	5	Chevrolet	50.698	177.522	
32	Jeff Burton	31	Chevrolet	50.724	177.431	
33	David Reutimann	44	Toyota	50.749	177.343	
34	Michael Waltrip	55	Toyota	50.770	177.270	
35	Scott Riggs	66	Chevrolet	50.796	177.179	*
36	Joe Nemechek	78	Chevrolet	50.823	177.085	*
37	Paul Menard	15	Chevrolet	50.848	176.998	
38	Sam Hornish Jr.	77	Dodge	50.911	176.779	
39	J.J. Yeley	96	Toyota	50.923	176.737	*
40	Terry Labonte	45	Dodge	51.000	176.471	PC
41	Bill Elliott	21	Ford	51.267	175.552	*
42	Clint Bowyer	07	Chevrolet	51.471	174.856	
43	Dave Blaney	22	Toyota	51.728	173.987	OP
44	Johnny Sauter	08	Dodge	51.803	173.735	*
45	Tony Raines	34	Chevrolet	51.996	173.090	*
46	Stanton Barrett	50	Chevrolet	52.258	172.222	*
47	Regan Smith	01	Chevrolet			OP

OP: qualified via owners points

PC: qualified as past champion

PR: provisional

QR: via qualifying race

* - had to qualify on time

Failed to qualify: Bill Elliott (#21), Stanton Barrett (#50), Johnny Sauter (#08), Tony Raines (#34).

== Race ==
Indianapolis Motor Speedway, the race track where the race was held.

In pre-race practice, teams realized that the tires provided for the race wore down quickly, due to the abrasive course at Indianapolis and the different characteristics of the fifth-generation car that was being used for the first time at Indianapolis. Concerns led NASCAR to implement caution periods after ten laps for tire wear, a procedure NASCAR debuted at 1969 Talladega 500, which had a driver boycott over tire wear issues, and NASCAR called cautions after a specific time in order to allow teams to pit and change tires.

Competition cautions were called between 10 and 12 laps. Because of an accident involving Michael Waltrip on Lap 4, the first competition yellow would not wave until Lap 14 for a crash when Kurt Busch lost the car off of Turn 1, hitting Kevin Harvick in the process. The only other non-competition yellow came halfway through the race when Brian Vickers' Toyota had its engine fail. Some drivers compared the racing to the roots of NASCAR with ten-lap heat races, as nine competition cautions and the two incidents combined effectively led to ten "heat races" were thrown with the final sprint being a "feature" race. Jimmie Johnson won the race after a battle with Carl Edwards after various teams attempted a two-tire stop in what effectively had become the caution leading to the final shootout, similar to the NASCAR Sprint All-Star Race.

Numerous drivers suffered tire failures during the race. Dale Earnhardt Jr. was the first on lap 26, blowing a right rear tire while leading the race. Just 3 laps later, Juan Pablo Montoya blew a tire coming off of turn 2. ESPN reported major tire cording on Jeff Gordon. On lap 47, Carl Edwards reported on the radio that he had a right rear tire problem. Just seconds later on the same lap, Matt Kenseth spun on the backstretch with a right rear tire failure, causing major damage to the right side of the car. ESPN reported Kyle Busch had some tire problems on lap 65. After that, tires showed a slight improvement, even though the tires still showed major cording. Throughout the race, drivers expressed their disappointment at the events that had occurred prior and during the event, with Matt Kenseth saying in the garage "It's a really, really disappointing situation. You know, this is one of the biggest races in the year, to never have this car here, before or not come into an open test and then working on this things working the tires, it's pretty darn disappointing... I feel bad for the fans and everything, when we're running three quarters speed because we're worried the tires are going to fall off and we got them blowing every 8 laps. I'm pretty disappointed." NASCAR president Mike Helton announced that NASCAR threw out more competition cautions than expected. Many NASCAR fans compare it to the 2005 United States Grand Prix tire debacle, when tires blowing out became a major concern for drivers. Some also say that this race was another incident that caused the decline of NASCAR's popularity.

== Results ==
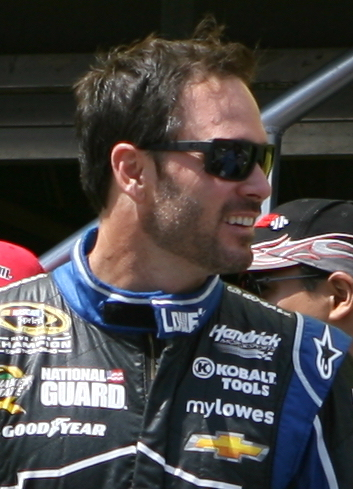
Jimmie Johnson won his second Brickyard 400.

POS	ST	#	DRIVER	SPONSOR / OWNER	CAR	LAPS	MONEY	STATUS	LED	PTS
1	1	48	Jimmie Johnson	Lowe's (Rick Hendrick)	Chevrolet	160	509236	running	71	195
2	9	99	Carl Edwards	Aflac (Jack Roush)	Ford	160	366700	running	4	175
3	23	11	Denny Hamlin	FedEx Office (Joe Gibbs)	Toyota	160	331516	running	26	170
4	6	19	Elliott Sadler	Stanley (Gillett Evernham Motorsports)	Dodge	160	290745	running	5	165
5	5	24	Jeff Gordon	DuPont (Rick Hendrick)	Chevrolet	160	275111	running	7	160
6	8	26	Jamie McMurray	Crown Royal (Jack Roush)	Ford	160	206850	running	0	150
7	4	9	Kasey Kahne	Budweiser / LifeLock (Gillett Evernham Motorsports)	Dodge	160	225491	running	0	146
8	12	16	Greg Biffle	Dish Network / Dish DVRs (Jack Roush)	Ford	160	196225	running	0	142
9	32	31	Jeff Burton	Prilosec OTC (Richard Childress)	Chevrolet	160	233783	running	10	143
10	26	84	A.J. Allmendinger	Red Bull (Dietrich Mateschitz)	Toyota	160	178775	running	4	139
11	2	8	Mark Martin	U.S. Army (Dale Earnhardt, Inc.)	Chevrolet	160	210383	running	0	130
12	11	88	Dale Earnhardt Jr.	National Guard / AMP Energy (Rick Hendrick)	Chevrolet	160	180950	running	8	132
13	3	12	Ryan Newman	Alltel (Roger Penske)	Dodge	160	207975	running	0	124
14	16	6	David Ragan	AAA Insurance (Jack Roush)	Ford	160	170000	running	0	121
15	19	18	Kyle Busch	M&M's (Joe Gibbs)	Toyota	160	180700	running	14	123
16	27	43	Bobby Labonte	Cheerios / Totino's Pizza Rolls (Petty Enterprises)	Dodge	160	195536	running	0	115
17	22	41	Reed Sorenson	Target (Chip Ganassi)	Dodge	160	184689	running	0	112
18	15	10	Patrick Carpentier	Sears Auto Center / Valvoline (Gillett Evernham Motorsports)	Dodge	160	154375	running	0	109
19	40	07	Clint Bowyer	Jack Daniel's (Richard Childress)	Chevrolet	160	169875	running	0	106
20	20	38	David Gilliland	FreeCreditReport.com (Yates Racing)	Ford	160	175183	running	0	103
21	38	77	Sam Hornish Jr.	Mobil 1 (Roger Penske)	Dodge	160	195400	running	0	100
22	24	47	Marcos Ambrose	Little Debbie Snacks (Tad Geschickter)	Ford	160	148825	running	0	97
23	14	20	Tony Stewart	Home Depot (Joe Gibbs)	Toyota	160	197461	running	0	94
24	25	1	Martin Truex Jr.	Bass Pro Shops / Cub Cadet (Dale Earnhardt, Inc.)	Chevrolet	160	182408	running	3	96
25	35	66	Scott Riggs	State Water Heaters (Gene Haas)	Chevrolet	160	166133	running	1	93
26	31	5	Casey Mears	Kellogg's / Carquest (Rick Hendrick)	Chevrolet	160	162725	running	0	85
27	43	45	Terry Labonte	Marathon American Spirit Motor Oil (Petty Enterprises)	Dodge	160	161083	running	0	82
28	39	96	J.J. Yeley	DLP HDTV (Jeff Moorad)	Toyota	160	153825	running	0	79
29	36	78	Joe Nemechek	Furniture Row / DenverMattress.com (Barney Visser)	Chevrolet	160	142225	running	0	76
30	33	44	David Reutimann	UPS (Michael Waltrip)	Toyota	160	145200	running	0	73
31	42	01	Regan Smith	Principal Financial Group (Dale Earnhardt, Inc.)	Chevrolet	160	152600	running	1	75
32	21	70	Jason Leffler	Hunt Brothers Pizza (Gene Haas)	Chevrolet	160	140700	running	0	67
33	29	7	Robby Gordon	Menards / Johns Manville (Robby Gordon)	Dodge	160	163558	running	0	64
34	30	00	Michael McDowell	Champion Mortgage (Michael Waltrip)	Toyota	160	150097	running	1	66
35	41	22	Dave Blaney	Caterpillar (Bill Davis)	Toyota	160	140300	running	1	63
36	28	28	Travis Kvapil	Hitachi Power Tools (Yates Racing)	Ford	160	168214	running	3	60
37	18	29	Kevin Harvick	Shell / Pennzoil (Richard Childress)	Chevrolet	148	186661	running	0	52
38	10	17	Matt Kenseth	DeWalt (Jack Roush)	Ford	144	187241	running	0	49
39	13	42	Juan Pablo Montoya	Wrigley's Big Red Slim Pack (Chip Ganassi)	Dodge	124	167408	crash	0	46
40	7	2	Kurt Busch	Miller Lite (Roger Penske)	Dodge	119	139425	running	0	43
41	37	15	Paul Menard	Menards / Johns Manville (Dale Earnhardt, Inc.)	Chevrolet	118	147300	running	0	40
42	17	83	Brian Vickers	Red Bull (Dietrich Mateschitz)	Toyota	93	147600	engine	1	42
43	34	55	Michael Waltrip	NAPA Auto Parts (Michael Waltrip)	Toyota	91	139494	running	0	34
Failed to qualify, withdrew, or driver changes:
POS	NAME	NBR	SPONSOR	OWNER	CAR					
44	Bill Elliott	21	Motorcraft	Wood Brothers	Ford					
45	Johnny Sauter	08	getFUBAR.com	John Carter	Dodge					
46	Tony Raines	34	doorstopnation.com	Bob Jenkins	Chevrolet					
47	Stanton Barrett	50	NOS Energy Drink	Chris Lencheski	Chevrolet					

== Post-race ==
Two days following the running of the race, NASCAR VP of competition Robin Pemberton formally apologized for the problems, saying that it did not go to IMS with the correct car-tire combination. To rectify those problems, Goodyear staged two additional tire tests at Indy in the fall, the first with only three teams as per the tiremaker's policy September 22 and 23; the other with as many as 12 teams on October 7 and 8 to detect what might have gone wrong and test a new tire to be used for the 2009 race. A total of 7 tests were conducted in preparation for the 2009 race.

The results of these tests indicated an increased amount of load and slip on the right rear tire caused the particle debris to be smaller than anticipated. This prevented rubber from adhering to the track and prevented tire wear from improving as the race progressed.

== Legacy ==
Many fans have pointed to this race to the overall decline of the Brickyard 400 in general. By 2021, NASCAR eventually moved the race to the Speedway's road course, although they returned to the oval in 2024.

== See also ==
- 2005 United States Grand Prix – a similar situation at the same track during the 2005 Formula One race
- 1969 Talladega 500 – the first race at Talladega, which suffered a similar situation

Previous race: 2008 LifeLock.com 400	Sprint Cup Series; 2008 season	Next race: 2008 Sunoco Red Cross Pennsylvania 500
