= 2008 Lenox Industrial Tools 301 =

Race details
- Race 17 of 36 in the 2008 NASCAR Sprint Cup Series
- Date: June 29, 2008
- Official name: Lenox Industrial Tools 301
- Location: New Hampshire Motor Speedway in Loudon, New Hampshire.
- Course: Permanent racing facility
- Course length: 1.058 miles (1.703 km)
- Distance: 284 laps, 300.472 mi (483.562 km)
- Scheduled distance: 301 laps, 318.458 mi (512.508 km)

Pole position
Driver	Patrick Carpentier	Gillett Evernham Motorsports
- Time: 29.349

Most laps led
Driver	Tony Stewart	Joe Gibbs Racing
- Laps: 132

Winner
No. 2	Kurt Busch	Penske Racing

Television in the United States
- Network: Turner Network Television
- Announcers: Bill Weber, Wally Dallenbach Jr. and Kyle Petty

The 2008 Lenox Industrial Tools 301 was the seventeenth race of the 2008 NASCAR Sprint Cup season, and was run on June 29 of that year at New Hampshire Motor Speedway, located in Loudon, New Hampshire. This was the first race under the new ownership of Speedway Motorsports, Inc. after purchasing the track from Bob Bahre in the autumn of 2007.

Televised coverage was handled by TNT starting at 12:30 PM US EDT, and radio was handled in their swan song at this facility by MRN starting at 1:15 PM US EDT and simulcast via Sirius Satellite Radio. Starting with the fall race, SMI-owned Performance Racing Network will carry the events at this track, as this was a result of a compromise on who had radio rights for the 2008 events (save for the NASCAR Craftsman Truck Series race in September, as MRN holds all rights to that series.) This race was also planned to be the first year of an additional lap on the 1.058 miles (1.703 km) track, as suggested by race sponsor Lenox Industrial Tools that says that their employees "go the extra mile" for their customers. However, due to a severe thunderstorm that bore down on the region, the race was stopped with seventeen laps to go. Kurt Busch won the race.

== Qualifying ==
In what may have been 2008's biggest surprise, Québécois Patrick Carpentier won the pole position over Bobby Labonte following a rain delay of almost two hours.

== Race recap ==
There were seven cautions in all, including one that involved an incident between points leader Kyle Busch and Juan Pablo Montoya after the yellow flag waved. Montoya broadsided Kyle Busch just after crossing the start-finish line in what turned out to be the last of several confrontations in the race between the two, and following the race, Montoya was penalized two laps for aggressive driving. A rainstorm shortened the race seventeen laps shy of the scheduled distance, and thanks to pit strategy and fuel mileage, Kurt Busch won the race, while Michael Waltrip had his best finish since winning the fall race at Talladega Superspeedway in 2003, and J. J. Yeley finished third.

Top Ten Finishers
Pos.	Car #	Driver	Car Make	Team
1	2	Kurt Busch	Dodge	Penske Racing
2	55	Michael Waltrip	Toyota	Michael Waltrip Racing
3	96	J. J. Yeley	Toyota	Hall of Fame Racing
4	1	Martin Truex Jr.	Chevrolet	Dale Earnhardt, Inc.
5	19	Elliott Sadler	Dodge	Gillett Evernham Motorsports
6	41	Reed Sorenson	Dodge	Chip Ganassi Racing
7	5	Casey Mears	Chevrolet	Hendrick Motorsports
8	11	Denny Hamlin	Toyota	Joe Gibbs Racing
9	48	Jimmie Johnson	Chevrolet	Hendrick Motorsports
10	43	Bobby Labonte	Dodge	Petty Enterprises

NOTE: Race was cut short to 284 laps due to rain.

Failed to qualify: Marcos Ambrose (#21) and Tony Raines (#34).
