= 2008 Sunoco Red Cross Pennsylvania 500 =

Race details
- Race 21 of 36 in the 2008 NASCAR Sprint Cup Series season
- 2008 Sunoco Red Cross Pennsylvania 500 program cover
- Date: August 3, 2008
- Official name: Sunoco Red Cross Pennsylvania 500
- Location: Pocono Raceway, Long Pond, Pennsylvania
- Course: Permanent racing facility
- Course length: 2.5 miles (4.023 km)
- Distance: 200 laps, 500 mi (804.672 km)
- Weather: Temperatures reaching up to 80.1 °F (26.7 °C); average wind speeds of 17.1 miles per hour (27.5 km/h) with 0.23 inches (0.58 cm) of rain within 24 hours of the race
- Average speed: 130.567 miles per hour (210.127 km/h)

Pole position
Driver	Jimmie Johnson	Hendrick Motorsports
- Time: 53.503

Most laps led
Driver	Mark Martin	Dale Earnhardt, Inc.
- Laps: 55

Winner
No. 99	Carl Edwards	Roush Fenway Racing

Television in the United States
- Network: ESPN
- Announcers: Jerry Punch, Andy Petree and Dale Jarrett

The 2008 Sunoco Red Cross Pennsylvania 500, the twenty-first race of the 2008 NASCAR Sprint Cup season and was held on August 3 of that year at Pocono Raceway in the village of Long Pond, Pennsylvania. ESPN carried the race beginning at 1 PM US EDT and MRN along with Sirius Satellite Radio had radio coverage of the 500 miles (800 km) race starting at 1:15 PM US EDT. The race was sponsored by Sunoco through its official NASCAR gasoline sponsorship and will benefit the American Red Cross Southeastern Pennsylvania chapter (covering Philadelphia and the surrounding five-county region), and marked the first time since 1996 that a race at the 2.5 miles (4.0 km) track has had a corporate sponsor.

== Pre-Race News ==
- Terry Labonte will pinch hit this week for Patrick Carpentier in the #10 Gillett Evernham Motorsports Dodge while Chad McCumbee will drive the #45 Petty Enterprises ride. Carpentier is running in the NAPA Auto Parts 200 on Saturday (8/2) in Montreal, Quebec.

== Qualifying ==
Jimmie Johnson took the pole position with Mark Martin and David Gilliland in the second and third positions, and Jeff Gordon starting fourth.

RANK	DRIVER	NBR	CAR	TIME	SPEED	
1	Jimmie Johnson	48	Chevrolet	53.503	168.215	
2	Mark Martin	8	Chevrolet	53.712	167.560	
3	David Gilliland	38	Ford	53.832	167.187	
4	Jeff Gordon	24	Chevrolet	53.858	167.106	
5	Matt Kenseth	17	Ford	53.930	166.883	
6	Ryan Newman	12	Dodge	53.962	166.784	
7	Kasey Kahne	9	Dodge	54.047	166.522	
8	Brian Vickers	83	Toyota	54.047	166.522	
9	Greg Biffle	16	Ford	54.049	166.516	
10	Kurt Busch	2	Dodge	54.072	166.445	
11	Bobby Labonte	43	Dodge	54.089	166.392	
12	Dale Earnhardt, Jr.	88	Chevrolet	54.103	166.349	
13	Juan Pablo Montoya	42	Dodge	54.152	166.199	
14	Denny Hamlin	11	Toyota	54.167	166.153	
15	Carl Edwards	99	Ford	54.192	166.076	
16	David Ragan	6	Ford	54.239	165.932	
17	Martin Truex, Jr.	1	Chevrolet	54.245	165.914	
18	Tony Raines	70	Chevrolet	54.260	165.868	*
19	Travis Kvapil	28	Ford	54.273	165.828	
20	Tony Stewart	20	Toyota	54.291	165.773	
21	Kevin Harvick	29	Chevrolet	54.293	165.767	
22	Paul Menard	15	Chevrolet	54.346	165.606	
23	Joe Nemechek	78	Chevrolet	54.352	165.587	*
24	Dave Blaney	22	Toyota	54.358	165.569	
25	Terry Labonte	10	Dodge	54.374	165.520	*
26	Sam Hornish, Jr.	77	Dodge	54.376	165.514	
27	Kyle Busch	18	Toyota	54.381	165.499	
28	David Reutimann	44	Toyota	54.392	165.466	
29	Elliott Sadler	19	Dodge	54.403	165.432	
30	Clint Bowyer	07	Chevrolet	54.423	165.371	
31	A. J. Allmendinger	84	Toyota	54.479	165.201	*
32	Reed Sorenson	41	Dodge	54.490	165.168	
33	Casey Mears	5	Chevrolet	54.493	165.159	
34	Chad McCumbee	45	Dodge	54.536	165.029	*
35	Michael McDowell	00	Toyota	54.542	165.010	*
36	Regan Smith	01	Chevrolet	54.628	164.751	
37	Bill Elliott	21	Ford	54.643	164.705	*
38	Robby Gordon	7	Dodge	54.650	164.684	
39	Jeff Burton	31	Chevrolet	54.658	164.660	
40	Scott Riggs	66	Chevrolet	54.696	164.546	
41	Jamie McMurray	26	Ford	54.703	164.525	
42	Michael Waltrip	55	Toyota	54.819	164.177	
43	J. J. Yeley	96	Toyota	55.123	163.271	*
44	Chad Chaffin	34	Chevrolet	55.791	161.316	*

OP: qualified via owners points

PC: qualified as past champion

PR: provisional

QR: via qualifying race

* - had to qualify on time

Failed to Qualify: Chad Chaffin (#34).

== Race Recap ==
After "Happy Hour" was washed out on Saturday due to rain, a mandatory caution would be flying at Lap 20, however two accidents predated them. A rain delay held up the race with 69 laps left, and Carl Edwards would win his fourth race of the season.

== Results ==
POS	ST	#	DRIVER	CAR	LAPS	STATUS	LED	PTS
1	15	99	Carl Edwards	Ford	200	running	53	190
2	20	20	Tony Stewart	Toyota	200	running	0	170
3	1	48	Jimmie Johnson	Chevrolet	200	running	34	170
4	21	29	Kevin Harvick	Chevrolet	200	running	0	160
5	16	6	David Ragan	Ford	200	running	1	160
6	30	07	Clint Bowyer	Chevrolet	200	running	0	150
7	7	9	Kasey Kahne	Dodge	200	running	41	151
8	2	8	Mark Martin	Chevrolet	200	running	55	152
9	41	26	Jamie McMurray	Ford	200	running	2	143
10	4	24	Jeff Gordon	Chevrolet	200	running	0	134
11	5	17	Matt Kenseth	Ford	200	running	3	135
12	12	88	Dale Earnhardt, Jr.	Chevrolet	200	running	1	132
13	9	16	Greg Biffle	Ford	200	running	2	129
14	6	12	Ryan Newman	Dodge	200	running	0	121
15	17	1	Martin Truex, Jr.	Chevrolet	200	running	0	118
16	19	28	Travis Kvapil	Ford	200	running	0	115
17	34	45	Chad McCumbee	Dodge	200	running	0	112
18	18	70	Tony Raines	Chevrolet	200	running	0	109
19	31	84	A. J. Allmendinger	Toyota	200	running	0	106
20	37	21	Bill Elliott	Ford	200	running	1	108
21	39	31	Jeff Burton	Chevrolet	200	running	0	100
22	33	5	Casey Mears	Chevrolet	200	running	0	97
23	14	11	Denny Hamlin	Toyota	200	running	0	94
24	35	00	Michael McDowell	Toyota	200	running	0	91
25	36	01	Regan Smith	Chevrolet	200	running	0	88
26	26	77	Sam Hornish, Jr.	Dodge	200	running	0	85
27	29	19	Elliott Sadler	Dodge	200	running	0	82
28	8	83	Brian Vickers	Toyota	200	running	0	79
29	40	66	Scott Riggs	Chevrolet	199	running	1	81
30	28	44	David Reutimann	Toyota	199	running	0	73
31	24	22	Dave Blaney	Toyota	199	running	0	70
32	25	10	Terry Labonte	Dodge	199	running	0	67
33	11	43	Bobby Labonte	Dodge	199	running	0	64
34	3	38	David Gilliland	Ford	199	running	0	61
35	32	41	Reed Sorenson	Dodge	199	running	0	58
36	27	18	Kyle Busch	Toyota	199	running	0	55
37	38	7	Robby Gordon	Dodge	198	running	0	52
38	10	2	Kurt Busch	Dodge	198	running	5	54
39	43	96	J. J. Yeley	Toyota	196	out of fuel	0	46
40	13	42	Juan Pablo Montoya	Dodge	146	engine	0	43
41	23	78	Joe Nemechek	Chevrolet	138	crash	0	40
42	22	15	Paul Menard	Chevrolet	137	crash	0	37
43	42	55	Michael Waltrip	Toyota	24	engine	1	39
Failed to qualify, withdrew, or driver changes:
POS	NAME	NBR	OWNER					
44	Chad Chaffin	34	Bob Jenkins					

Previous race: 2008 Allstate 400 at the Brickyard	Sprint Cup Series; 2008 season	Next race: 2008 Centurion Boats at the Glen
