= 2008 LifeLock.com 400 =

Race details
- Race 19 of 36 in the 2008 NASCAR Sprint Cup Series season
- Layout of Chicagoland Speedway
- Date: July 12, 2008
- Official name: LifeLock.com 400
- Location: Chicagoland Speedway, Joliet, Illinois
- Course: Permanent racing facility
- Course length: 1.5 miles (2.414 km)
- Distance: 267 laps, 400.5 mi (644.542 km)
- Weather: Temperatures reaching a low of 68 °F (20 °C); wind speeds up to 15 miles per hour (24 km/h)
- Average speed: 133.996 miles per hour (215.646 km/h)

Pole position
Driver	Kyle Busch	Joe Gibbs Racing

Most laps led
Driver	Kyle Busch	Joe Gibbs Racing
- Laps: 165

Winner
No. 18	Kyle Busch	Joe Gibbs Racing

Television in the United States
- Network: Turner Network Television
- Announcers: Bill Weber, Wally Dallenbach Jr. and Kyle Petty

The 2008 LifeLock.com 400 was the nineteenth race of the 2008 NASCAR Sprint Cup season, and the final race under the TNT coverage for the year.

== Summary ==
It was held on July 12 of that year at Chicagoland Speedway in Joliet, Illinois, as the race moved to a nighttime event for the first time in the event's history. Televised pre-race activities were scheduled to start at 6:30 PM US EDT, with the radio broadcast of the race handled by Sirius Satellite Radio via MRN, starting at 7:15 PM US EDT. The winner of the race was Kyle Busch, who drove past Jimmie Johnson on the final restart of the race. During practice, Kurt Busch uttered over the radio that his "car just drives like shit".

== Qualifying ==
Qualifying was cancelled due to rain, so the field was set by NASCAR's rulebook.

Johnny Sauter in the No. 08 and Tony Raines in the No. 34 failed to qualify for the race.

Previous race: 2008 Coke Zero 400	Sprint Cup Series; 2008 season	Next race: 2008 Allstate 400 at the Brickyard
