= 2008 NASCAR Sprint Cup Series =

American motorsport season

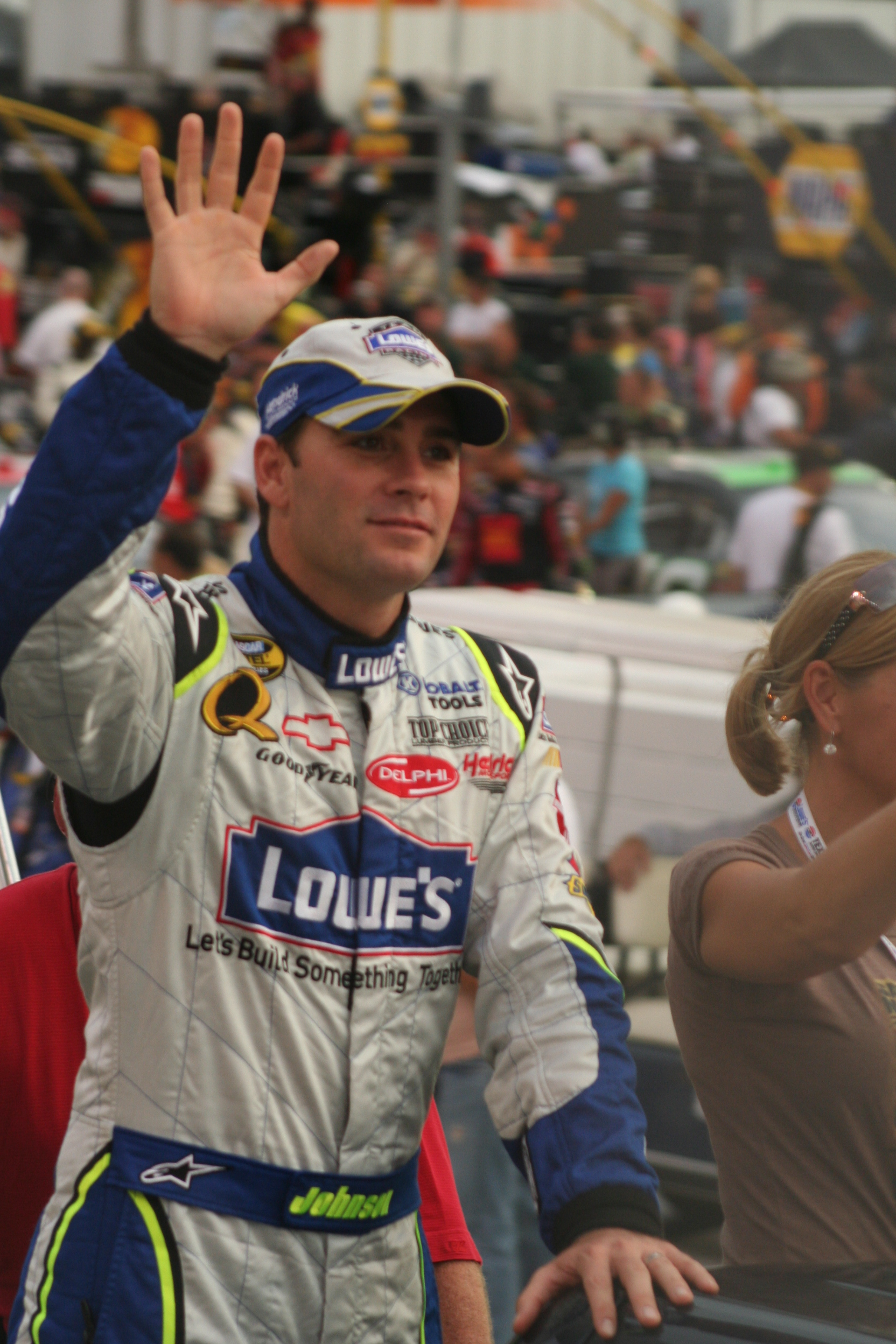
Jimmie Johnson, the 2008 Sprint Cup Series champion successfully defended his title. This was the third of his five consecutive titles, seven overall.

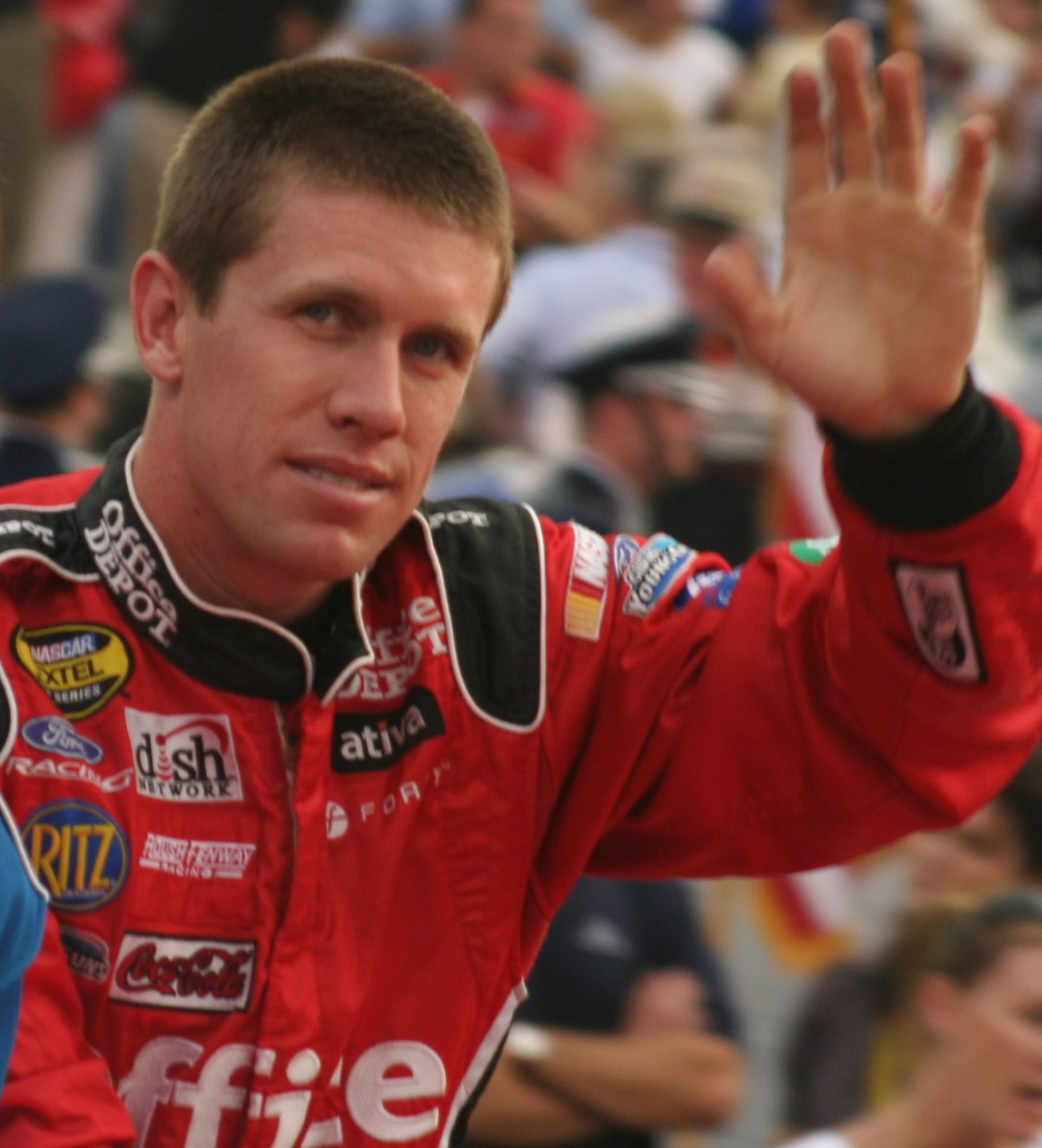
Carl Edwards came in second behind Johnson by 69 points.

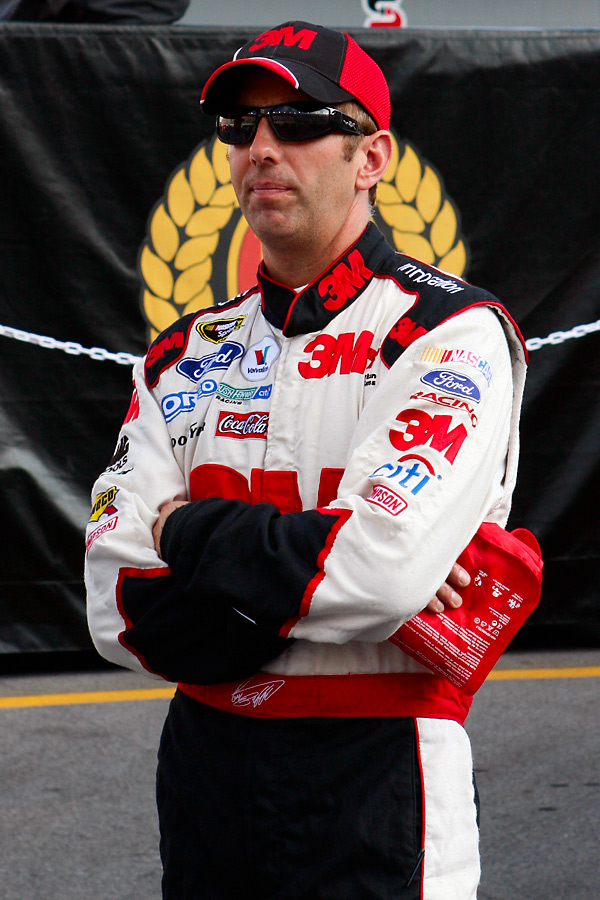
Greg Biffle finished third in the championship.

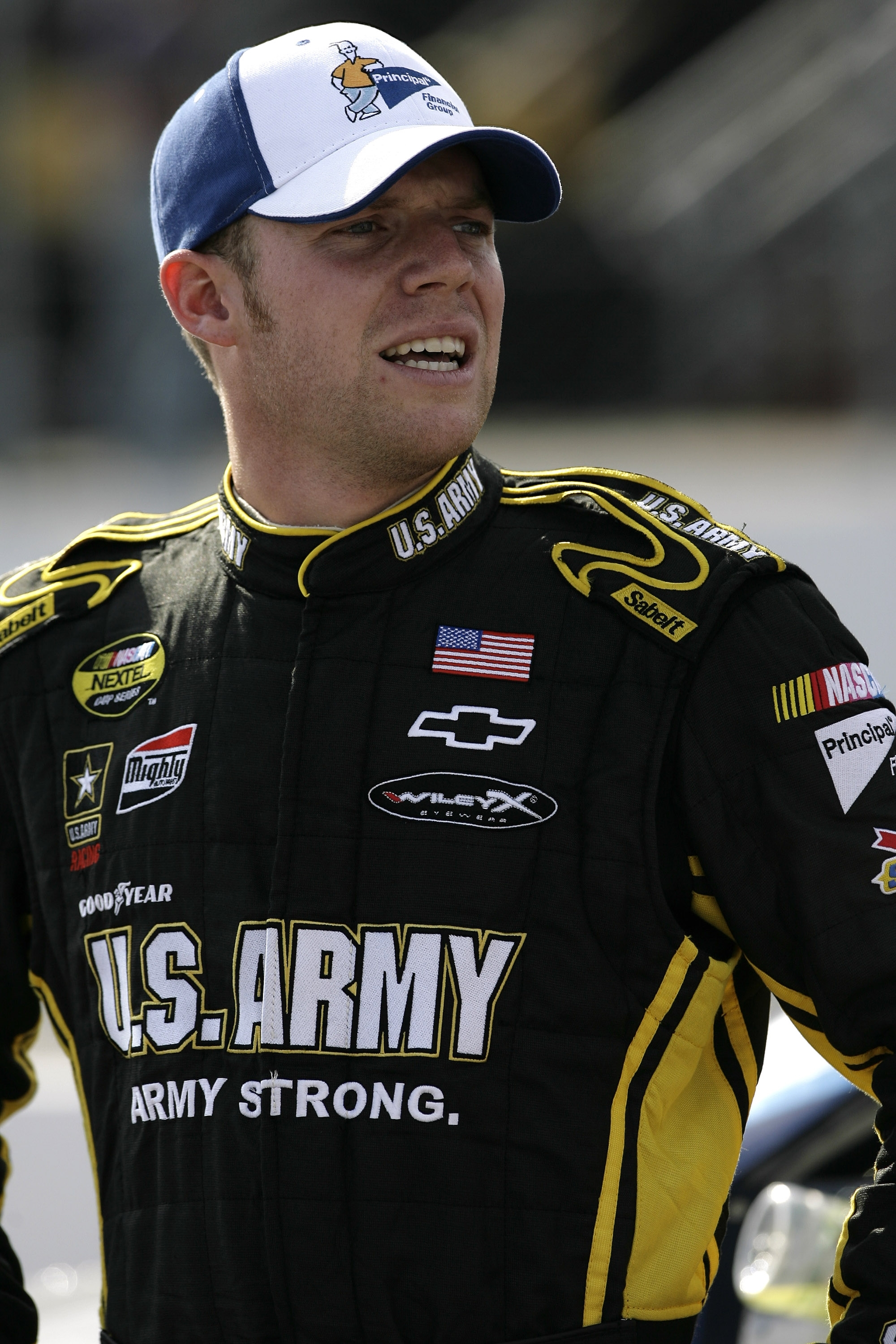
Regan Smith, the 2008 NASCAR Rookie of the Year.

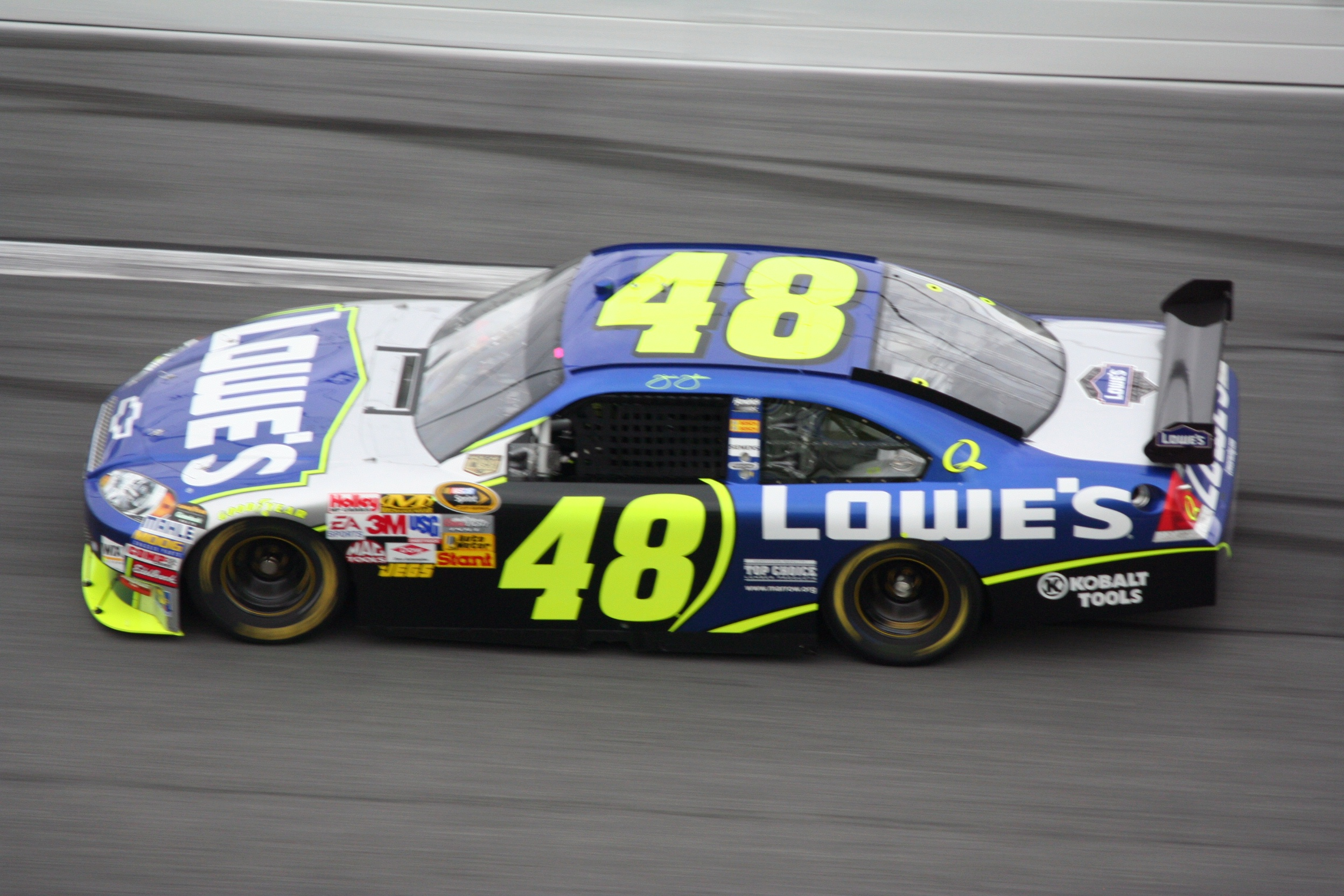
Chevrolet won the Manufacturer's championship with 11 wins.

The 2008 NASCAR Sprint Cup Series was the 60th season of professional stock car racing in the United States and the 37th modern-era Cup season. It was contested over thirty-six races, and began on February 9 at Daytona International Speedway with the Budweiser Shootout exhibition race, followed by the 50th Daytona 500 on February 17. The season continued with the 2008 Chase for the Sprint Cup beginning on September 14 with the Sylvania 300 at New Hampshire Motor Speedway and concluded with the Ford 400 at Homestead-Miami Speedway on November 16.

As a result of the merger between Sprint Corporation and Nextel Communications, NASCAR's premier series was renamed as the NASCAR Sprint Cup Series beginning with the 2008 season, 2008 marked the first season that the Car of Tomorrow was used for the entire season after being used for select races during the 2007 season. Coors Light also replaced Budweiser as the Official Beer of NASCAR, thereby becoming the new sponsor of the Pole Award given to the pole winner in each Sprint Cup Series race. However, Budweiser was still the official sponsor for the Bud Shootout at Daytona in February. Jimmie Johnson of Hendrick Motorsports was crowned champion at season's end, making him only the second driver in NASCAR's top division to win three championships in a row, with the first being Cale Yarborough.

== Top stories ==
=== Car of Tomorrow ===
All Sprint Cup races utilized the Car of Tomorrow (CoT) template. NASCAR announced on May 22, 2007, that the original timetable, which would have the full-time use of the single car template in 2009, was being abandoned as 80% of all owners were in favor of moving the full-time use of the CoT one year ahead so they would not race with two sets of rules for all but ten races. The cars approved for the 2008 season were the Chevrolet Impala, the Dodge Charger, the Ford Fusion and the Toyota Camry. Dodge had used the Avenger in the 2007 CoT races, but stated that the Charger would be used full-time in 2008.

=== Economic problems affect NASCAR ===
The 2008 financial crisis, with high gas prices over US $4 a gallon caused NASCAR's largely blue-collar fan base to feel the pinch.

While Bristol was one of a few tracks that still sold out, others saw crowds shrink. Daytona International Speedway sold out the Daytona 500, but not the Coke Zero 400. Some track ticket packages now included all-you-can-eat deals, and tracks also offered nearby campgrounds to entice those who come for several days to see Nationwide and Craftsman Truck races. For their fall race, Lowe's Motor Speedway offered discounts on local hotel rooms, novelties and food and drink.

The economy also affected the teams themselves with high diesel fuel prices, with that fuel needed to power the semi-trailer trucks which transport the race cars to and from racetracks. Sponsorships also grew increasingly harder to come by, further increasing the gap between teams. Before the season began, Morgan-McClure Motorsports ceased operations for their single-car team, while Yates Racing had no major sponsor on the No. 28 and No. 38 cars that they run in the series, as their M&M's sponsorships moved to the Joe Gibbs Racing No. 18 team. The Yates team made do in piecemeal fashion, finding companies to sponsor a few races at a time, a practice that paid the bills but stretched the marketing department. As a result of the cutbacks, half of the one hundred employees at Yates were laid off.

Even better sponsored teams struggled. On July 1, Chip Ganassi Racing shut down its No. 40 team with 2007 IndyCar Champion and Indianapolis 500 winner Dario Franchitti driving because of a lack of sponsorship funding, becoming the first major victim. Ganassi Racing lost 70 jobs as a result of the closure. Other companies also switched teams for 2009. Caterpillar Inc., despite its decade long relationship with Bill Davis Racing and its flagship No. 22, moved to Richard Childress Racing's No. 31 car driven by Jeff Burton, while General Mills, associating itself with Petty Enterprises since 2000, also left to head for RCR's fourth team.

To counter many of these problems, teams also took on financial partners, much like Fenway Sports Group joining Jack Roush and George N. Gillett Jr. teaming up with Ray Evernham last year. In June 2008, Petty Enterprises sold a majority share to Boston Ventures as another example of the economic struggles.

== Teams and drivers ==
=== Complete schedule ===
List of NASCAR Sprint Cup Series teams in 2008 (43 full-time teams).

Manufacturer	Team	No.	Driver(s)	Crew chief
Chevrolet	Dale Earnhardt, Inc.	01	Regan Smith (R) 34	Dan Stillman
Chevrolet	Dale Earnhardt, Inc.	01	Ron Fellows 2	Dan Stillman
Chevrolet	Dale Earnhardt, Inc.	1	Martin Truex Jr.	Kevin Manion
Chevrolet	Dale Earnhardt, Inc.	8	Mark Martin 24	Tony Gibson
Chevrolet	Dale Earnhardt, Inc.	8	Aric Almirola 12	Tony Gibson
Chevrolet	Dale Earnhardt, Inc.	15	Paul Menard	Doug Randolph
Chevrolet	Haas CNC Racing	66	Scott Riggs 35	Bootie Barker
Chevrolet	Haas CNC Racing	66	Max Papis 1	Bootie Barker
Chevrolet	Haas CNC Racing	70	Jeremy Mayfield 7	Dave Skog 12; Steve Genenbacher 8
Chevrolet	Haas CNC Racing	70	Johnny Sauter 9	Dave Skog 12; Steve Genenbacher 8
Chevrolet	Haas CNC Racing	70	Ken Schrader 1	Dave Skog 12; Steve Genenbacher 8
Chevrolet	Haas CNC Racing	70	Jason Leffler 5	Dave Skog 12; Steve Genenbacher 8
Chevrolet	Haas CNC Racing	70	Scott Riggs 1	Dave Skog 12; Steve Genenbacher 8
Chevrolet	Haas CNC Racing	70	Tony Raines 12	Dave Skog 12; Steve Genenbacher 8
Chevrolet	Haas CNC Racing	70	Max Papis 1	Dave Skog 12; Steve Genenbacher 8
Chevrolet	Richard Childress Racing	07	Clint Bowyer	Gil Martin
Chevrolet	Richard Childress Racing	29	Kevin Harvick	Todd Berrier
Chevrolet	Richard Childress Racing	31	Jeff Burton	Scott Miller
Chevrolet	Hendrick Motorsports	5	Casey Mears	Alan Gustafson
Chevrolet	Hendrick Motorsports	24	Jeff Gordon	Steve Letarte
Chevrolet	Hendrick Motorsports	48	Jimmie Johnson	Chad Knaus
Chevrolet	Hendrick Motorsports	88	Dale Earnhardt Jr.	Tony Eury Jr.
Chevrolet	Furniture Row Racing	78	Joe Nemechek	Jay Guy
Dodge	Chip Ganassi Racing with Felix Sabates	41	Reed Sorenson 35	Jimmy Elledge 8 Donnie Wingo 28
Dodge	Chip Ganassi Racing with Felix Sabates	41	Scott Pruett 1	Jimmy Elledge 8 Donnie Wingo 28
Dodge	Chip Ganassi Racing with Felix Sabates	42	Juan Pablo Montoya	Donnie Wingo 8 Jimmy Elledge 8 Brian Pattie 20
Dodge	Gillett Evernham Motorsports	9	Kasey Kahne	Kenny Francis
Dodge	Gillett Evernham Motorsports	10	Patrick Carpentier (R) 29	Mike Shiplett
Dodge	Gillett Evernham Motorsports	10	Terry Labonte 1	Mike Shiplett
Dodge	Gillett Evernham Motorsports	10	Mike Wallace 1	Mike Shiplett
Dodge	Gillett Evernham Motorsports	10	A. J. Allmendinger 5	Mike Shiplett
Dodge	Gillett Evernham Motorsports	19	Elliott Sadler	Rodney Childers 35; Kevin Kidd 1
Dodge	Penske Racing South	2	Kurt Busch	Pat Tryson
Dodge	Penske Racing South	12	Ryan Newman	Roy McCauley
Dodge	Penske Racing South	77	Sam Hornish Jr. (R)	Chris Carrier 24; Travis Geisler 12
Dodge	Petty Enterprises	43	Bobby Labonte	Jeff Meendering
Dodge	Petty Enterprises	45	Kyle Petty 17	Billy Wilburn 5 Stewart Cooper 31
Dodge	Petty Enterprises	45	Chad McCumbee 9	Billy Wilburn 5 Stewart Cooper 31
Dodge	Petty Enterprises	45	Terry Labonte 9	Billy Wilburn 5 Stewart Cooper 31
Dodge	Petty Enterprises	45	Boris Said 1	Billy Wilburn 5 Stewart Cooper 31
Dodge	Robby Gordon Motorsports	7	Robby Gordon	Frank Kerr 10; Walter Giles 16; Kirk Almquist 10
Ford	Roush Fenway Racing	6	David Ragan	Jimmy Fennig
Ford	Roush Fenway Racing	16	Greg Biffle	Greg Erwin
Ford	Roush Fenway Racing	17	Matt Kenseth	Chip Bolin
Ford	Roush Fenway Racing	26	Jamie McMurray	Larry Carter
Ford	Roush Fenway Racing	99	Carl Edwards	Bob Osborne
Ford	Wood Brothers Racing	21	Bill Elliott 23	Gene Nead 6 Mike Smith 16; David Hyder 14
Ford	Wood Brothers Racing	21	Johnny Sauter 1	Gene Nead 6 Mike Smith 16; David Hyder 14
Ford	Wood Brothers Racing	21	Jeff Green 1	Gene Nead 6 Mike Smith 16; David Hyder 14
Ford	Wood Brothers Racing	21	Jon Wood 5	Gene Nead 6 Mike Smith 16; David Hyder 14
Ford	Wood Brothers Racing	21	Marcos Ambrose 6	Gene Nead 6 Mike Smith 16; David Hyder 14
Ford	Yates Racing	28	Travis Kvapil	Todd Parrott
Ford	Yates Racing	38	David Gilliland	Cully Barraclough
Toyota	Bill Davis Racing	22	Dave Blaney	Tommy Baldwin Jr.
Toyota	Hall of Fame Racing	96	J. J. Yeley 21	Brandon Thomas 5 Steve Boyer 31
Toyota	Hall of Fame Racing	96	P. J. Jones 1	Brandon Thomas 5 Steve Boyer 31
Toyota	Hall of Fame Racing	96	Brad Coleman 1	Brandon Thomas 5 Steve Boyer 31
Toyota	Hall of Fame Racing	96	Ken Schrader 11	Brandon Thomas 5 Steve Boyer 31
Toyota	Hall of Fame Racing	96	Joey Logano 2	Brandon Thomas 5 Steve Boyer 31
Toyota	Joe Gibbs Racing	11	Denny Hamlin	Mike Ford
Toyota	Joe Gibbs Racing	18	Kyle Busch	Steve Addington
Toyota	Joe Gibbs Racing	20	Tony Stewart	Greg Zipadelli
Toyota	Michael Waltrip Racing	00 1	David Reutimann 5	Ryan Pemberton
Toyota	Michael Waltrip Racing	00 1	Michael McDowell (R) 21	Bill Pappas 15; Peter Sospenzo 12
Toyota	Michael Waltrip Racing	00 1	Mike Skinner 3	Bill Pappas 15; Peter Sospenzo 12
Toyota	Michael Waltrip Racing	00 1	Kenny Wallace 1	Bill Pappas 15; Peter Sospenzo 12
Toyota	Michael Waltrip Racing	00 1	A. J. Allmendinger 1	Bill Pappas 15; Peter Sospenzo 12
Toyota	Michael Waltrip Racing	00 1	Mike Bliss 1	Bill Pappas 15; Peter Sospenzo 12
Toyota	Michael Waltrip Racing	00 1	Marcos Ambrose 4	Frank Kerr
Toyota	Michael Waltrip Racing	44	Dale Jarrett 5	Bill Pappas
Toyota	Michael Waltrip Racing	44	David Reutimann 31	Ryan Pemberton
Toyota	Michael Waltrip Racing	55	Michael Waltrip	Paul Andrews 6 Bobby Kennedy 30
Toyota	Team Red Bull	83	Brian Vickers 35	Kevin Hamlin 33; Randy Cox 2
Toyota	Team Red Bull	83	Scott Speed 1	Jimmy Elledge
Toyota	Team Red Bull	84	A. J. Allmendinger 24	Ricky Viers 19; Jimmy Elledge 16
Toyota	Team Red Bull	84	Mike Skinner 7	Ricky Viers 19; Jimmy Elledge 16
Toyota	Team Red Bull	84	Scott Speed 4	Ricky Viers 19; Jimmy Elledge 16
Toyota	Team Red Bull	84	Brian Vickers 1	Randy Cox

=== Limited schedule ===
Manufacturer	Team	No.	Race driver	Crew chief	Round(s)
Chevrolet	Front Row Motorsports	37	Eric McClure	Cal Boprey	1
Chevrolet	SKI Motorsports	50	Stanton Barrett	Ricky Pearson	4
Chevrolet	Richard Childress Racing	33	Scott Wimmer	Shane Wilson	1
Chevrolet	Richard Childress Racing	33	Ken Schrader	Shane Wilson	1
Chevrolet	Richard Childress Racing	33	Mike Wallace	Shane Wilson	1
Chevrolet	Phoenix Racing	09	Sterling Marlin	Marc Reno	12
Chevrolet	Hendrick Motorsports	25	Brad Keselowski	Lance McGrew	3
Chevrolet	Furniture Row Racing	87	Kenny Wallace	Ed Nathman	1
Dodge	Brandon Ash Racing	02	Brandon Ash	Kenneth Wood	1
Dodge	Carl Long Racing	46	Carl Long	Charles Swing	1
Dodge	Chip Ganassi Racing with Felix Sabates	40	Dario Franchitti (R)	Steve Lane	13
Dodge	Chip Ganassi Racing with Felix Sabates	40	David Stremme	Steve Lane	1
Dodge	Chip Ganassi Racing with Felix Sabates	40	Ken Schrader	Steve Lane	1
Dodge	Chip Ganassi Racing with Felix Sabates	40	Sterling Marlin	Steve Lane	2
Dodge	Chip Ganassi Racing with Felix Sabates	40	Jeremy Mayfield	Steve Lane	1
Dodge	Chip Ganassi Racing with Felix Sabates	40	Bryan Clauson	Steve Lane	3
Dodge	Derrike Cope, Inc.	75	Derrike Cope	Dom Turse	2
Dodge	E&M Motorsports	08	Carl Long	Tony Furr; Charles Swing	1
Dodge	E&M Motorsports	08	Burney Lamar	Tony Furr; Charles Swing	3
Dodge	E&M Motorsports	08	Tony Raines	Tony Furr; Charles Swing	2
Dodge	E&M Motorsports	08	Johnny Sauter	Tony Furr; Charles Swing	8
Ford	No Fear Racing	60	Boris Said	Frank Stoddard	4
Ford	JTG Racing	47	Marcos Ambrose	Frank Kerr	2
Toyota	Team Red Bull	82	Scott Speed	Slugger Labbe	1
Toyota	Joe Gibbs Racing	02	Joey Logano	Wally Brown	3
Toyota	Germain Racing	13	Max Papis	Randy Goss	2
Toyota	Bill Davis Racing	27	Jacques Villeneuve (R)	Slugger Labbe	1
Toyota	Bill Davis Racing	27	Mike Skinner	Slugger Labbe	2
Toyota	Bill Davis Racing	27	Johnny Benson	Slugger Labbe	1
Dodge Toyota	BAM Racing	49	Ken Schrader	David Hyder	6
Chevrolet Ford	Front Row Motorsports	34	John Andretti	Scott Eggleston	10
Chevrolet Ford	Front Row Motorsports	34	Jeff Green	Scott Eggleston	3
Chevrolet Ford	Front Row Motorsports	34	Tony Raines	Scott Eggleston	7
Chevrolet Ford	Front Row Motorsports	34	Chad Chaffin	Scott Eggleston	2
Chevrolet Ford	Front Row Motorsports	34	Brian Simo	Scott Eggleston	2

== Schedule ==
No.	Race title	Track	Date
	Budweiser Shootout	Daytona International Speedway, Daytona Beach	February 9
	Gatorade Duels	Daytona International Speedway, Daytona Beach	February 14
1	Daytona 500	Daytona International Speedway, Daytona Beach	February 17
2	Auto Club 500	Auto Club Speedway, Fontana	February 24/25
3	UAW-Dodge 400	Las Vegas Motor Speedway, Las Vegas, Nevada	March 2
4	Kobalt Tools 500	Atlanta Motor Speedway, Hampton	March 9
5	Food City 500	Bristol Motor Speedway, Bristol	March 16
6	Goody's Cool Orange 500	Martinsville Speedway, Ridgeway	March 30
7	Samsung 500	Texas Motor Speedway, Fort Worth	April 6
8	Subway Fresh Fit 500	Phoenix International Raceway, Phoenix	April 12
9	Aaron's 499	Talladega Superspeedway, Talladega	April 27
10	Crown Royal presents the Dan Lowry 400	Richmond International Raceway, Richmond	May 3
11	Dodge Challenger 500	Darlington Raceway, Darlington	May 10
	Sprint Showdown	Lowe's Motor Speedway, Concord	May 17
	Sprint All-Star Challenge	Lowe's Motor Speedway, Concord	May 17
12	Coca-Cola 600	Lowe's Motor Speedway, Concord	May 25
13	Best Buy 400 benefiting Student Clubs for Autism Speaks	Dover International Speedway, Dover	June 1
14	Pocono 500	Pocono Raceway, Long Pond	June 8
15	LifeLock 400	Michigan International Speedway, Brooklyn	June 15
16	Toyota/Save Mart 350	Infineon Raceway, Sonoma	June 22
17	Lenox Industrial Tools 301	New Hampshire Motor Speedway, Loudon	June 29
18	Coke Zero 400 powered by Coca-Cola	Daytona International Speedway, Daytona Beach	July 5
19	LifeLock.com 400	Chicagoland Speedway, Joliet	July 12
20	Allstate 400 at the Brickyard	Indianapolis Motor Speedway, Speedway	July 27
21	Sunoco Red Cross Pennsylvania 500	Pocono Raceway, Long Pond	August 3
22	Centurion Boats at The Glen	Watkins Glen International, Watkins Glen	August 10
23	3M Performance 400 presented by Bondo	Michigan International Speedway, Brooklyn	August 17
24	Sharpie 500	Bristol Motor Speedway, Bristol	August 23
25	Pepsi 500	Auto Club Speedway, Fontana	August 31
26	Chevy Rock & Roll 400	Richmond International Raceway, Richmond	September 7
Chase for the Sprint Cup
27	Sylvania 300	New Hampshire Motor Speedway, Loudon	September 14
28	Camping World RV 400 presented by AAA	Dover International Speedway, Dover	September 21
29	Camping World RV 400 presented by Coleman	Kansas Speedway, Kansas City	September 28
30	AMP Energy 500	Talladega Superspeedway, Talladega	October 5
31	Bank of America 500	Lowe's Motor Speedway, Concord	October 11
32	Tums QuikPak 500	Martinsville Speedway, Ridgeway	October 19
33	Pep Boys Auto 500	Atlanta Motor Speedway, Hampton	October 26
34	Dickies 500	Texas Motor Speedway, Fort Worth	November 2
35	Checker O'Reilly Auto Parts 500 presented by Pennzoil	Phoenix International Raceway, Phoenix	November 9
36	Ford 400	Homestead-Miami Speedway, Homestead	November 16

== Television ==
=== United States ===
The 2008 season marked the second year of television contracts with Fox, TNT and ESPN/ABC. The biggest changes involved ESPN and ABC, as Dale Jarrett became the network's lead race color commentator and Rusty Wallace became the pre-race analyst. Dale, who completed his driving career with the Sprint All-Star Race XXIV, followed in the footsteps of his father, Ned, who worked with ESPN through most of the 1980s through the 2000 NASCAR season. Allen Bestwick took over the hosting role for all races as well as some editions of ESPN2's NASCAR Now, replacing Brent Musburger and Suzy Kolber on the pre-race show, with Shannon Spake taking Bestwick's place as pit reporter. Also, veteran NASCAR reporter Nicole Manske (along with Ryan Burr) took over as a part-time host of NASCAR Now show for Erik Kuselias. No major changes were made by Fox and TNT for the 2008 season.

One innovation was Fox's "Gopher Cam", placed below the track near the inside of the turns for a unique perspective. In the need for a name for their new mascot, Fox turned to internet users and even drivers for suggestions, and the gopher cam mascot was named "Digger". "Digger" is now emblazoned on T-shirts, hats and even as a plush toy.

Another innovation was TNT's "RaceBuddy", an internet application that showed multiple views of the race and radio feeds from drivers (using NASCAR.com Race Day Scanner).

=== Canada and Mexico ===
In Canada NASCAR races were seen on TSN and RDS in English and French, while Speed Channel Latin America held the rights in Mexico and all of Latin America, including the Bud Shootout, the Gatorade Duels and the Sprint All-Star Race.

=== Outside North America ===
Sky Sports held the rights in Great Britain, while Five US aired a one-hour highlights package preceding each race. In Australia the 2008 Sprint Cup Series season was covered by Fox SPORTS as usual however, Free-to-air TV TEN HD presented marquee events live along with one hour highlights packages from all other rounds the Saturday after the event. Ten HD also presented the entire Nationwide series season, marking the first time that a full NASCAR Championship was shown on Free-to-Air TV in Australia, mostly due to Marcos Ambrose's involvement in the series. NTV held the rights in Japan, while Sky Italia held rights in Italy (only NNS) and Premiere Sport held the German rights. In Spain, Teledeporte broadcast six live races and hour-long summaries of the remaining thirty.

== 2008 competition changes ==
On January 21, 2008, NASCAR announced various competition changes for the 2008 season.

=== Qualifying procedures ===
- In all three national series, teams that were not locked into the starting field via the Owners Points exemption qualified together as a group at the end of their respective qualifying sessions. This rule was dubbed "The Boris Said Rule" as per what happened during qualifying for the 2007 Pepsi 400, where Said was the provisional pole sitter when rain washed out the remainder of qualifying, and rules required that all cars must attempt to make a lap before inclement weather stops all activities. The session was washed out, and Said did not make the field as the field was set by the rulebook (Top 35 in points among owners, past race winners and qualifying attempts).

=== Revisions to pit road rules ===
- Over-the-wall pit crews in NASCAR's three national series were able to hand push their car no more than three pit boxes away from their assigned pit box—limiting the crews to the same three-box length for pushing as the vehicles could drive through getting onto pit road.
- Outside tires that had been removed from a vehicle during a pit stop could no longer be free-rolled from the outside of the pit box to the wall. The tires were required to be hand-directed to the inner half of the pit box before being released.

=== Fuel cell size ===
- Only NASCAR Sprint Cup Series ran the same upgraded 17 3/4 gallon fuel cell which was used in the 2007 Nextel Cup Series. The fuel cell was a safety feature that was added that year, replacing the old 22-gallon cell while 22-gallon cell was retained for NASCAR Nationwide Series and NASCAR Craftsman Truck Series.

=== Engines ===
- A new engine combination package introduced in the Nationwide and Craftsman Truck series allowed for cost-saving opportunities for teams. Modifications reduced RPMs and horsepower, which helped engines and pieces to last longer. In turn, teams had the opportunity to run multiple races using the same engine components.

=== Tire usage at non-sanctioned tests ===
- Teams in all three national series received an allotment of tires to use for non-NASCAR sanctioned tests. Cup Series teams had access to 200 tires over the course of the year (except for tests that were sanctioned by Goodyear); Nationwide teams got 160 tires and Truck teams got 120 tires.

=== NASCAR fines ===
- Money collected from fines issued to drivers and others was remitted to the NASCAR Foundation, which supported a variety of charitable initiatives. Previously, fine money had been added to the season-ending point funds paid to drivers based on their finish in the point standings.

== Testing ==
The first tests followed the change of the calendar at Daytona International Speedway in the first two full weeks of January. Teams that finished in odd numbered positions (1, 3, 5, etc.) through the 2007 USG Sheetrock 400 tested January 7 through 9, while even numbered finishers (2, 4, 6, etc.) through that same period tested January 14 through 16. Speed televised nightly reports throughout this period, as well as the events of the annual Media Tour in Charlotte and the tests in Las Vegas (held on January 28 and 29th) and California (held on January 31 and February 1).

The remaining dates and tracks that were announced December 4, 2007 were:

- Phoenix International Raceway – March 3 and 4
- Pocono Raceway – May 27 and 28
- Lowe's Motor Speedway – September 23 and 24

On April 15, an additional practice session was announced by NASCAR at Lowe's to be held on May 5 and 6th due to problems that were unforeseen at both Las Vegas and Texas during their spring races.

== 2008 season races ==
=== Budweiser Shootout ===
The 2008 NASCAR season and the 2008 edition of Speedweeks began with the thirtieth annual Budweiser Shootout on February 9 at Daytona International Speedway in Daytona Beach, Florida. The non-points race, featured the previous season's pole winners and past winners of the event. Following tradition teams randomly picked their starting positions, Kurt Busch drew the pole, but ultimately had to start near the rear due to a crash in final practice. The 2008 race set a record with 23 drivers starting the race, the largest field ever in the event. Dale Earnhardt Jr. won his first NASCAR race with his new team Hendrick Motorsports and his first Sprint Cup Series win since May 2006 at Richmond, leading a record 47 of the 70 laps.

Top ten finishers
Finishers 1–5					Finishers 6–10				
Pos.	Car #	Driver	Make	Team	Pos.	Car #	Driver	Make	Team
1	88	Dale Earnhardt Jr.	Chevrolet	Hendrick Motorsports	6	5	Casey Mears	Chevrolet	Hendrick Motorsports
2	20	Tony Stewart	Toyota	Joe Gibbs Racing	7	22	Dave Blaney	Toyota	Bill Davis Racing
3	48	Jimmie Johnson	Chevrolet	Hendrick Motorsports	8	8	Mark Martin	Chevrolet	Dale Earnhardt, Inc.
4	24	Jeff Gordon	Chevrolet	Hendrick Motorsports	9	11	Denny Hamlin	Toyota	Joe Gibbs Racing
5	41	Reed Sorenson	Dodge	Chip Ganassi Racing	10	9	Kasey Kahne	Dodge	Gillett Evernham Motorsports

=== Daytona 500 ===
==== Pole qualifying ====
Qualifying for the 2008 Daytona 500 in Daytona Beach, Florida at Daytona International Speedway took place on February 10 of that year. Jimmie Johnson won the pole with Michael Waltrip starting second who had been the center of controversy during a cheating scandal in last year's race.

==== Gatorade Duels ====
The Gatorade Duels were held on February 14, 2008, which established the starting order for the 2008 Daytona 500. Dale Earnhardt Jr. won the first race, with Darrell Waltrip waving the green flag, and the race was wreck free, while the second race was won by Denny Hamlin driving a Toyota, giving the Japanese manufacturer its first Sprint Cup Series victory. The win also marked the first win by a foreign make since 1954, when Al Keller won at Linden Airport, driving a Jaguar. Bill Elliott driving the #21 Ford for Wood Brothers Racing failed to race his way in during the first duel, this will be the first time the Wood Brothers team has not competed in NASCAR's signature event in 46 years. A wreck in the second race on lap 17 took out Jacques Villeneuve, Stanton Barrett, Dario Franchitti, and Jamie McMurray after Villeneuve got loose in turn 3.

Gatorade Duels
Top ten finishers (race #1)					Top ten finishers (race #2)				
Pos.	Car #	Driver	Make	Team	Pos.	Car #	Driver	Make	Team
1	88	Dale Earnhardt Jr.	Chevrolet	Hendrick Motorsports	1	11	Denny Hamlin	Toyota	Joe Gibbs Racing
2	41	Reed Sorenson	Dodge	Chip Ganassi Racing	2	20	Tony Stewart	Toyota	Joe Gibbs Racing
3	12	Ryan Newman	Dodge	Penske Racing	3	24	Jeff Gordon	Chevrolet	Hendrick Motorsports
4	5	Casey Mears	Chevrolet	Hendrick Motorsports	4	9	Kasey Kahne	Dodge	Gillett Evernham Motorsports
5	99	Carl Edwards	Ford	Roush Fenway Racing	5	8	Mark Martin	Chevrolet	Dale Earnhardt, Inc.
6	43	Bobby Labonte	Dodge	Petty Enterprises	6	6	David Ragan	Ford	Roush Fenway Racing
7	42	Juan Pablo Montoya	Dodge	Chip Ganassi Racing	7	29	Kevin Harvick	Chevrolet	Richard Childress Racing
8	87	**Kenny Wallace**	Chevrolet	Furniture Row Racing	8	16	Greg Biffle	Ford	Roush Fenway Racing
9	77	Sam Hornish Jr.	Dodge	Penske Racing	9	44	**Dale Jarrett**	Toyota	Michael Waltrip Racing
10	15	Paul Menard	Chevrolet	Dale Earnhardt, Inc.	10	34	**John Andretti**	Chevrolet	Front Row Motorsports
Also qualifying for Daytona 500: Brian Vickers (#83 Team Red Bull Toyota.					Race two finish was extended four laps due to green-white-checker finish rule.				
Drivers who were top two not in previous season's Top 35 points are in boldface.

==== Daytona 500 ====
The 50th annual running of the Daytona 500 was held on February 17, 2008, marking the 50th anniversary since the inaugural running in 1959. Ryan Newman won the race with teammate Kurt Busch finishing second, it marked team owner Roger Penske's first win on a restrictor-plate track. The win also ended Ryan Newman's 81 race winless drought in Sprint Cup Series racing. Jeff Burton led during the last restart with 3 laps left and immediately lost the lead. Tony Stewart led during the last lap but it was the Penske Racing teammates of Ryan Newman and Kurt Busch who denied Stewart the win as he tried for the 10th time to win the race.

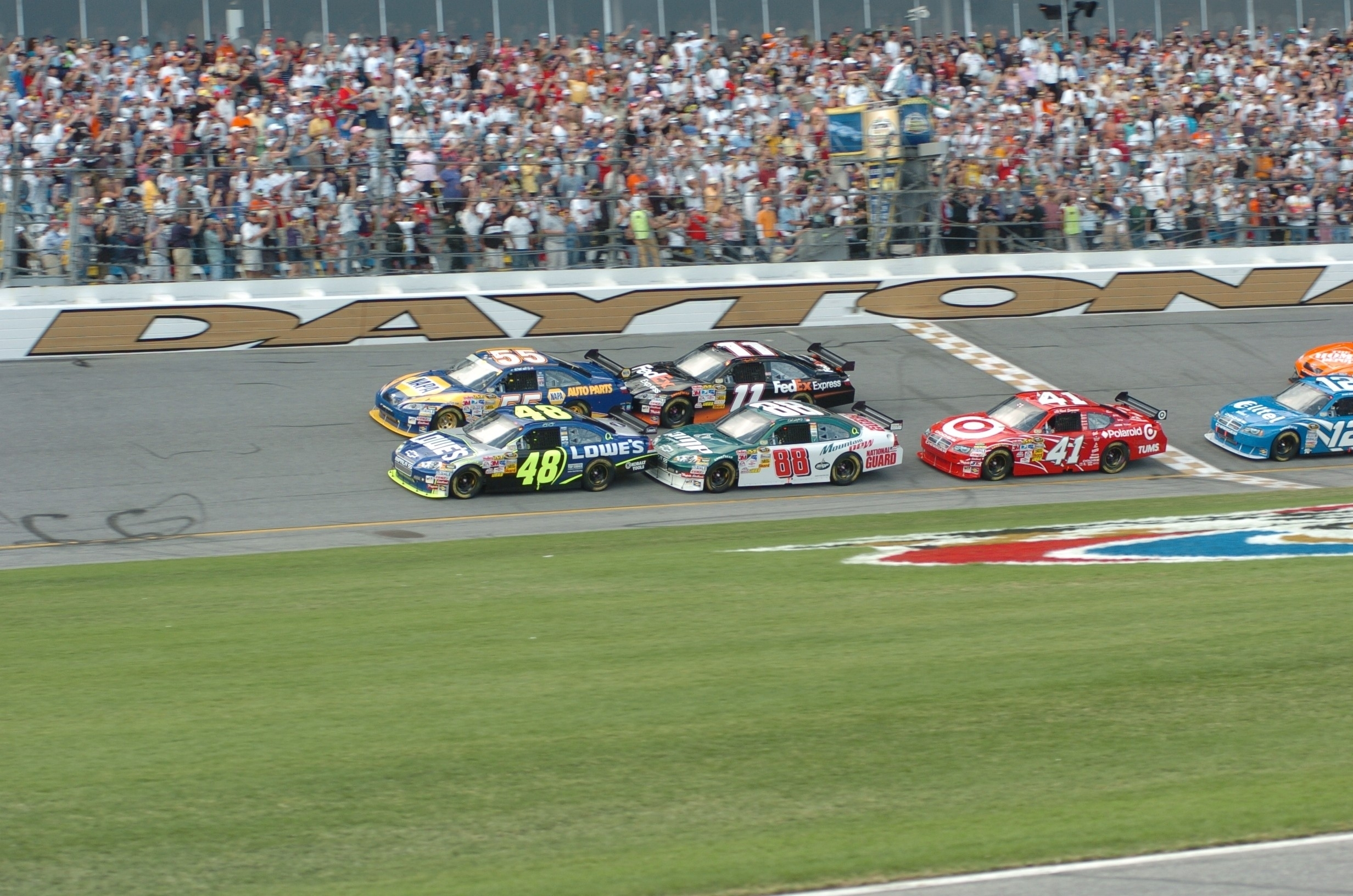
#48-Jimmie Johnson takes the green flag alongside #55-Michael Waltrip in the start of the 50th running of "The Great American Race".

Top ten finishers					Failed to qualify	
Pos.	Car #	Driver	Make	Team	race 1	race 2
1	12	Ryan Newman	Dodge	Penske Racing	A. J. Allmendinger (#84)	Ken Schrader (#49)
2	2	Kurt Busch	Dodge	Penske Racing	Bill Elliott (#21)	Patrick Carpentier (#10)
3	20	Tony Stewart	Toyota	Joe Gibbs Racing	Boris Said (#60)	Eric McClure (#37)
4	18	Kyle Busch	Toyota	Joe Gibbs Racing	Sterling Marlin (#09)	Jacques Villeneuve (#27)
5	41	Reed Sorenson	Dodge	Chip Ganassi Racing	Carl Long (#08)	Stanton Barrett (#50)
6	19	Elliott Sadler	Dodge	Gillett Evernham Motorsports		
7	9	Kasey Kahne	Dodge	Gillett Evernham Motorsports		
8	7	Robby Gordon	Dodge	Robby Gordon Motorsports		
9	88	Dale Earnhardt Jr.	Chevrolet	Hendrick Motorsports		
10	16	Greg Biffle	Ford	Roush Fenway Racing		
Robby Gordon, the owner/driver of the #7 Dodge, was penalized both 100 championship driver and owner points after NASCAR officials confiscated an unapproved Dodge Charger nose piece on his Car of Tomorrow during opening day inspection for the Daytona 500 on February 8. Gordon's crew chief Frank Kerr was fined $100,000 and suspended for the next six Sprint Cup Series events until April 9. The points penalty dropped him to 40th place after finishing 8th in the season opener. However, on March 5, an appeals committee overturned the point penalty and suspension but increased the fine to $150,000. Gordon's infraction occurred because a nose that Gillett Evernham Motorsports had given the team was not yet approved. The team had switched to Dodge from Ford after Daytona testing and has assistance from Gillett Evernham Motorsports, which gave the nose in question.

=== Auto Club 500 ===
The 2008 Auto Club 500 was run on February 24 and February 25 due to rain at the newly renamed Auto Club Speedway of Southern California (previously California Speedway) in Fontana, California. Qualifying was canceled for the Sprint Cup, Nationwide and Craftsman Truck Series after periods of rain showers fell for most of the day on Friday. As a result, the race lineup was determined by the NASCAR rule book. The race began on late Sunday afternoon but was red flagged and eventually postponed until Monday morning. Veteran NASCAR driver Mark Martin made his 700th Sprint Cup Series start. The first caution of the race was brought out when Denny Hamlin lost control in turn 3 after running over some water that had seeps up through cracks in the track surface. The next caution involved a large wreck when Casey Mears spun out in turn 2 after also running over water. The wreck collected Casey's teammate Dale Earnhardt Jr.

Reed Sorenson and Sam Hornish Jr. were also involved. Hornish hit Sorenson's car causing his car's hood to come up and hit his windshield obscuring his vision leading him to rear end the back of Casey Mears' car causing Mears' car to tumble onto its side. The race was red flagged as track workers cleaned up and tried to repair the water problem by cutting into the track. Drivers who were involved in early wrecks notably Earnhardt Jr. and Mears complained that NASCAR should not have started the race with water still seeping onto the track. Eventually a seventh caution for rain put the race on hold, at 11:00 PM PT (2:00 AM ET), NASCAR decided to postpone the remaining race laps until Monday morning at 10:00 AM PT (1:00 PM ET) due to seeping water on the track. When the race resumed, it was Hendrick Motorsports teammates Jeff Gordon and Jimmie Johnson leading the race until Carl Edwards took the lead from Johnson to win his first race at Auto Club Speedway. The Nationwide Series race was run one hour after the conclusion of the Sprint Cup race.

Top ten finishers
Pos.	Car #	Driver	Make	Team
1	99	Carl Edwards	Ford	Roush Fenway Racing
2	48	Jimmie Johnson	Chevrolet	Hendrick Motorsports
3	24	Jeff Gordon	Chevrolet	Hendrick Motorsports
4	18	Kyle Busch	Toyota	Joe Gibbs Racing
5	17	Matt Kenseth	Ford	Roush Fenway Racing
6	1	Martin Truex Jr.	Chevrolet	Dale Earnhardt, Inc.
7	20	Tony Stewart	Toyota	Joe Gibbs Racing
8	29	Kevin Harvick	Chevrolet	Richard Childress Racing
9	9	Kasey Kahne	Dodge	Gillett Evernham Motorsports
10	12	Ryan Newman	Dodge	Penske Racing

Failed to make race as qualifying was canceled due to rain: Patrick Carpentier (#10), Mike Skinner (#27), Ken Schrader (#49), A. J. Allmendinger (#84), Burney Lamar (#08)

=== UAW-Dodge 400 ===
The UAW-Dodge 400 was run on March 2 at Las Vegas Motor Speedway. Kyle Busch, a Las Vegas native, won the pole and led 56 laps in the race before slipping to 11th. Matt Kenseth also ran strong during the race leading 70 laps and was running third with five laps to go when he was spun by Jeff Gordon. Gordon's car hit hard against the inside retaining wall head on at 180 miles per hour, and the wall did not have a SAFER barrier, this caused his car's radiator to fly out from the chassis into the path of oncoming traffic. Kenseth was able to recover from the spin without hitting anything. The wreck brought a red flag on lap 264 as track workers cleaned up, Jeff Gordon walked away sore from the wreck and made the point that SAFER barriers should be installed to the inside walls. Carl Edwards went on to win his second race in a row and the ninth of his career.

Following the race it was announced that the #99 car driven by Edwards had failed post-race inspection. On March 5, Edwards was docked 100 championship points with team owner Jack Roush also docked 100 owner points. Carl Edwards' crew chief Bob Osbourne was fined $100,000 and suspended for six races until April 30. As the 99 team qualified for the Chase for the Sprint Cup, the team did not receive 10 bonus points for the UAW-Dodge 400 victory used for determining the Chase seeding order.

Top ten finishers
Pos.	Car #	Driver	Make	Team
1	99	Carl Edwards	Ford	Roush Fenway Racing
2	88	Dale Earnhardt Jr.	Chevrolet	Hendrick Motorsports
3	16	Greg Biffle	Ford	Roush Fenway Racing
4	29	Kevin Harvick	Chevrolet	Richard Childress Racing
5	31	Jeff Burton	Chevrolet	Richard Childress Racing
6	6	David Ragan	Ford	Roush Fenway Racing
7	9	Kasey Kahne	Dodge	Gillett Evernham Motorsports
8	28	Travis Kvapil	Ford	Yates Racing
9	11	Denny Hamlin	Toyota	Joe Gibbs Racing
10	8	Mark Martin	Chevrolet	Dale Earnhardt, Inc.

Failed to qualify: A. J. Allmendinger (#84), Joe Nemechek (#78), John Andretti (#34), Johnny Sauter (#21; crashed on first lap)

NOTE: Burney Lamar (#08) withdrew prior to qualifying.

=== Kobalt Tools 500 ===
The Kobalt Tools 500 was held on March 9 at Atlanta Motor Speedway. Jeff Gordon won the pole. Carl Edwards had the car to beat along with Kyle Busch, although Edwards' engine expired late in the race. Busch would go on to lead 173 laps and win the race.

Top ten finishers
Pos.	Car #	Driver	Make	Team
1	18	Kyle Busch	Toyota	Joe Gibbs Racing
2	20	Tony Stewart	Toyota	Joe Gibbs Racing
3	88	Dale Earnhardt Jr.	Chevrolet	Hendrick Motorsports
4	16	Greg Biffle	Ford	Roush Fenway Racing
5	24	Jeff Gordon	Chevrolet	Hendrick Motorsports
6	07	Clint Bowyer	Chevrolet	Richard Childress Racing
7	29	Kevin Harvick	Chevrolet	Richard Childress Racing
8	17	Matt Kenseth	Ford	Roush Fenway Racing
9	83	Brian Vickers	Toyota	Team Red Bull
10	31	Jeff Burton	Chevrolet	Richard Childress Racing

Failed to qualify: Ken Schrader (#49), Bill Elliott (#21), Johnny Benson (#27), John Andretti (#34), Burney Lamar (#08)

=== Food City 500 ===
The Food City 500 was held on March 16 at Bristol Motor Speedway in Bristol, Tennessee. Qualifying was canceled due to a day-long rain on March 14, and as a result, the field was set by NASCAR's rulebook, giving Jimmie Johnson the 2007 series champion, the pole position. Jeff Burton won the race after it was extended six laps due to the green-white-checkered finish rule when Denny Hamlin had fuel pump problems on the final restart. This was 1999 champion Dale Jarrett's final points race after 668 career starts.

Top ten finishers
Pos.	Car #	Driver	Make	Team
1	31	Jeff Burton	Chevrolet	Richard Childress Racing
2	29	Kevin Harvick	Chevrolet	Richard Childress Racing
3	07	Clint Bowyer	Chevrolet	Richard Childress Racing
4	16	Greg Biffle	Ford	Roush Fenway Racing
5	88	Dale Earnhardt Jr.	Chevrolet	Hendrick Motorsports
6	11	Denny Hamlin	Toyota	Joe Gibbs Racing
7	9	Kasey Kahne	Dodge	Gillett Evernham Motorsports
8	8	Aric Almirola	Chevrolet	Dale Earnhardt, Inc.
9	38	David Gilliland	Ford	Yates Racing
10	17	Matt Kenseth	Ford	Roush Fenway Racing

NOTE: Race extended six laps due to green-white-checkered finish.

Failed to make race as qualifying was canceled due to rain: Patrick Carpentier (#10), Jeff Green (#21), John Andretti (#34).

As a result of the standings after this race, two teams that were not in the Top-35 in owners points, the #83 Red Bull Toyota Camry of Brian Vickers and the #2 Miller Lite Dodge Charger of Kurt Busch (owners points were given to the #77) were locked into the Top 35 after the first five races.

=== Goody's Cool Orange 500 ===
The Goody's Cool Orange 500 was held on March 30 at Martinsville Speedway in Ridgeway, Virginia. Jeff Gordon won the pole. Kyle Petty failed to make the race after Dario Franchitti tied with his qualifying time, due to the fact that Franchitti was 38th in owners points and Petty was 40th, marking the first time since 2004 that he failed to make a race. Denny Hamlin won this race, the second for Toyota in Sprint Cup history. The race was notable for having 20 caution periods, the second most ever during a NASCAR Sprint Cup race; only the 22 cautions imposed at the 2005 Coca-Cola 600 has more.

Top ten finishers
Pos.	Car #	Driver	Make	Team
1	11	Denny Hamlin	Toyota	Joe Gibbs Racing
2	24	Jeff Gordon	Chevrolet	Hendrick Motorsports
3	31	Jeff Burton	Chevrolet	Richard Childress Racing
4	48	Jimmie Johnson	Chevrolet	Hendrick Motorsports
5	20	Tony Stewart	Toyota	Joe Gibbs Racing
6	88	Dale Earnhardt Jr.	Chevrolet	Hendrick Motorsports
7	5	Casey Mears	Chevrolet	Hendrick Motorsports
8	26	Jamie McMurray	Ford	Roush Fenway Racing
9	99	Carl Edwards	Ford	Roush Fenway Racing
10	07	Clint Bowyer	Chevrolet	Richard Childress Racing

Failed to qualify: Kyle Petty (#45), Tony Raines (#08), John Andretti (#34), Joe Nemechek (#78)

=== Samsung 500 ===
The Samsung 500 was held on April 6 at Texas Motor Speedway in Fort Worth, Texas. Dale Earnhardt Jr. won the pole. The race was won by Carl Edwards who started 2nd and led 123 laps. The major story of the race weekend was Michael McDowell's near head-on crash during qualifying after he lost control heading into turn 1 on his second lap. McDowell's car slammed into the turn 1 SAFER barrier and spun upside down for several hundred yards before the car began a series of at least eight barrel rolls, coming to rest at the bottom of the race track near the infield. McDowell exited the car and was ok. Qualifying was delayed 1 hour and 12 minutes as NASCAR officials assessed and repaired damage to the SAFER barrier.

Top ten finishers
Pos.	Car #	Driver	Make	Team
1	99	Carl Edwards	Ford	Roush Fenway Racing
2	48	Jimmie Johnson	Chevrolet	Hendrick Motorsports
3	18	Kyle Busch	Toyota	Joe Gibbs Racing
4	12	Ryan Newman	Dodge	Penske Racing
5	11	Denny Hamlin	Toyota	Joe Gibbs Racing
6	31	Jeff Burton	Chevrolet	Richard Childress Racing
7	20	Tony Stewart	Toyota	Joe Gibbs Racing
8	8	Mark Martin	Chevrolet	Dale Earnhardt, Inc.
9	17	Matt Kenseth	Ford	Roush Fenway Racing
10	07	Clint Bowyer	Chevrolet	Richard Childress Racing

NOTES: 1. Race extended five laps due to a green-white-checkered finish.
2. During post race inspection Ryan Newman's #12 car was found to be one-eighth of an inch higher beyond the allotted half-inch tolerance. As a result, Newman and car owner Roger Penske were penalized 25 championship driver and 25 championship owner points, respectively. Crew chief Roy McCauley was fined $25,000 and placed on probation until December 31.

Failed to qualify: Dario Franchitti (#40), Chad McCumbee (#45), Burney Lamar (#08)

=== Subway Fresh Fit 500 ===
The Subway Fresh Fit 500 was held on April 12 at Phoenix International Raceway in Avondale, Arizona. Ryan Newman won the pole. Coverage of the pre-race was interrupted when Fox switched over to cover the remaining Yankees-Red Sox baseball game. Jimmie Johnson won the race by not pitting for fuel during the last laps. The win marked Hendrick Motorsports' first win of the 2008 season.

Top ten finishers
Pos.	Car #	Driver	Make	Team
1	48	Jimmie Johnson	Chevrolet	Hendrick Motorsports
2	07	Clint Bowyer	Chevrolet	Richard Childress Racing
3	11	Denny Hamlin	Toyota	Joe Gibbs Racing
4	99	Carl Edwards	Ford	Roush Fenway Racing
5	8	Mark Martin	Chevrolet	Dale Earnhardt, Inc.
6	31	Jeff Burton	Chevrolet	Richard Childress Racing
7	88	Dale Earnhardt Jr.	Chevrolet	Hendrick Motorsports
8	1	Martin Truex Jr.	Chevrolet	Dale Earnhardt, Inc.
9	16	Greg Biffle	Ford	Roush Fenway Racing
10	18	Kyle Busch	Toyota	Joe Gibbs Racing

Failed to qualify: Kyle Petty (#45), John Andretti (#34)

=== Aaron's 499 ===
The Aaron's 499 was held April 27 at Talladega Superspeedway in Talladega, Alabama. The race marked the one-quarter mark of the season. Joe Nemechek won the pole. David Stremme substituted for Dario Franchitti, who fractured his left ankle in a hard crash during the Nationwide Series Aaron's 312 race. Kyle Busch won the race after leading only 12 laps. The race featured only eight cautions. Most of those cautions were results of one or two car incidents. However, the last caution was a result of the "Big One" that occurred in the final moments of the race. Because the crash occurred after the white flag had been waved, the race was allowed to finish under caution.

Top ten finishers
Pos.	Car #	Driver	Make	Team
1	18	Kyle Busch	Toyota	Joe Gibbs Racing
2	42	Juan Pablo Montoya	Dodge	Chip Ganassi Racing
3	11	Denny Hamlin	Toyota	Joe Gibbs Racing
4	6	David Ragan	Ford	Roush Fenway Racing
5	83	Brian Vickers	Toyota	Team Red Bull
6	28	Travis Kvapil	Ford	Yates Racing
7	5	Casey Mears	Chevrolet	Hendrick Motorsports
8	12	Ryan Newman	Dodge	Penske Racing
9	07	Clint Bowyer	Chevrolet	Richard Childress Racing
10	88	Dale Earnhardt Jr.	Chevrolet	Hendrick Motorsports

Failed to qualify: Dave Blaney (#22), J. J. Yeley (#96), John Andretti (#34)

=== Crown Royal presents the Dan Lowry 400 ===
The Crown Royal presents the Dan Lowry 400 was held on May 3 at Richmond International Raceway in Richmond, Virginia. Denny Hamlin won the pole and went on to lead 381 of the 400 laps. However, a leaking right-front tire caused him to fall back with 18 laps left. It then appeared that Dale Earnhardt Jr. whose last Sprint Cup win came at this race two years ago, would be able to win the race and end his winless streak. However Kyle Busch recovered from a restart failure and drove after Earnhardt Jr. With 5 laps left, Kyle Busch and Dale Earnhardt Jr. got side by side and Earnhardt Jr. crashed with 3 laps left. The caution flew and the fans were angry with Kyle Busch even though it was clear and obvious that Busch was not at fault; and that he and Earnhardt Jr. were just plain, cleanly racing and refusing to lose. Earnhardt Jr. himself said on the radio and in the post-race ceremonies that Busch was not at fault but nonetheless the fans jeered Busch for the rest of the race and in the days that followed.

Meanwhile, at the time of the contact RCR driver Clint Bowyer caught up with the two leaders and stole the lead from Kyle Busch. On the final restart Clint Bowyer drove off for his second NSCS victory while Kyle Busch fought Mark Martin for second place. It was Bowyer's last win in NASCAR while numbered as 07, and this win brought Chevrolet to winning the most NASCAR wins in history.

The other big story of the race was that Michael Waltrip was parked by NASCAR. With 46 laps left a caution flew when Casey Mears crashed. It was seen that Waltrip's hood was locked on Mears' rear and Waltrip was trying frantically to crash Mears. The hits caused Casey Mears to crash and bring out the yellow. Prior to the hits with Casey, Waltrip had hit the wall because of Casey's racing moves. NASCAR instantly parked Michael Waltrip causing Waltrip to face his first disqualification of his career.

Top ten finishers
Pos.	Car no.	Driver	Make	Team
1	07	Clint Bowyer	Chevrolet	Richard Childress Racing
2	18	Kyle Busch	Toyota	Joe Gibbs Racing
3	8	Mark Martin	Chevrolet	Dale Earnhardt, Inc.
4	20	Tony Stewart	Toyota	Joe Gibbs Racing
5	1	Martin Truex Jr.	Chevrolet	Dale Earnhardt, Inc.
6	12	Ryan Newman	Dodge	Penske Racing
7	99	Carl Edwards	Ford	Roush Fenway Racing
8	29	Kevin Harvick	Chevrolet	Richard Childress Racing
9	24	Jeff Gordon	Chevrolet	Hendrick Motorsports
10	9	Kasey Kahne	Dodge	Gillett Evernham Motorsports

NOTE: Race was extended by eight laps due to green-white-checker finish.

Failed to qualify: Ken Schrader (#40), Scott Wimmer (#33), Jon Wood (#21), John Andretti (#34)

=== Dodge Challenger 500 ===
The Dodge Challenger 500 was run May 10 at the newly repaved Darlington Raceway in Darlington, South Carolina. Greg Biffle won the pole, breaking Ward Burton's long standing pole speed by 5.6 mph (9.0 km/h), mostly due to the repaved surface on the track. Kyle Busch was the winner of the race. this would be the last race under the "Dodge Challenger 500" name; next year the race will return to the original name of the Southern 500.

Top ten finishers
Pos.	Car #	Driver	Car make	Team
1	18	Kyle Busch	Toyota	Joe Gibbs Racing
2	99	Carl Edwards	Ford	Roush Fenway Racing
3	24	Jeff Gordon	Chevrolet	Hendrick Motorsports
4	88	Dale Earnhardt Jr.	Chevrolet	Hendrick Motorsports
5	6	David Ragan	Ford	Roush Fenway Racing
6	17	Matt Kenseth	Ford	Roush Fenway Racing
7	11	Denny Hamlin	Toyota	Joe Gibbs Racing
8	28	Travis Kvapil	Ford	Yates Racing
9	22	Dave Blaney	Toyota	Bill Davis Racing
10	31	Jeff Burton	Chevrolet	Richard Childress Racing

Failed to qualify: Johnny Sauter (#70), Jeff Green (#34)

=== Sprint All-Star Race XXIV ===
Sprint All-Star Race XXIV and the Sprint Showdown were both held on May 17 at Lowe's Motor Speedway in the Charlotte, North Carolina suburb of Concord. This non-points race involved winners of the 2007 and 2008 season, along with past Sprint Cup champions and All-Star Race winners from the past decade (1998 through 2007) plus the top two finishing drivers of the Sprint Showdown and a driver voted in by fans from the Showdown whose car had to be raceable. On the line was $1,000,000 in prize money for the winner. Kasey Kahne finished fifth in the Showdown and was voted into the All-Star event and went onto capture the victory, becoming the third driver to qualify from the preliminary race and win the main event and the first chosen by the fan vote to do the same. The only cautions the race had was after all 4 segments ended which was 4 cautions.

==== Sprint Showdown ====
Top Two Finishers
Pos.	Car #	Driver	Make	Team
1	84	A. J. Allmendinger	Toyota	Team Red Bull
2	77	Sam Hornish Jr.	Dodge	Penske Racing
Qualified via Fan Voting
5	9	Kasey Kahne	Dodge	Gillett Evernham Motorsports

==== All-Star Race ====
Top ten finishers
Pos.	Car #	Driver	Make	Team
1	9	Kasey Kahne	Dodge	Gillett Evernham Motorsports
2	16	Greg Biffle	Ford	Roush Fenway Racing
3	17	Matt Kenseth	Ford	Roush Fenway Racing
4	48	Jimmie Johnson	Chevrolet	Hendrick Motorsports
5	20	Tony Stewart	Toyota	Joe Gibbs Racing
6	12	Ryan Newman	Dodge	Penske Racing
7	77	Sam Hornish Jr.	Dodge	Penske Racing
8	88	Dale Earnhardt Jr.	Chevrolet	Hendrick Motorsports
9	8	Mark Martin	Chevrolet	Dale Earnhardt, Inc.
10	99	Carl Edwards	Ford	Roush Fenway Racing

=== Coca-Cola 600 ===
NASCAR's longest race in terms of distance, the Coca-Cola 600 was run on May 25 at Lowe's Motor Speedway in Concord, North Carolina, a suburb of Charlotte. Kyle Busch won the pole. Tony Stewart led the race in the final laps after making a pit stop for fuel only, but with three laps remaining Stewart blew a tire giving the lead to Kasey Kahne who was running five seconds behind. Kahne and Greg Biffle finished first and second respectively for the second week in a row. Kahne became the first driver to win the Coca-Cola 600 and the All-Star Race in the same year since Jimmie Johnson in 2003, and the sixth overall.

Top ten finishers
Pos.	Car #	Driver	Make	Team
1	9	Kasey Kahne	Dodge	Gillett Evernham Motorsports
2	16	Greg Biffle	Ford	Roush Fenway Racing
3	18	Kyle Busch	Toyota	Joe Gibbs Racing
4	24	Jeff Gordon	Chevrolet	Hendrick Motorsports
5	88	Dale Earnhardt Jr.	Chevrolet	Hendrick Motorsports
6	31	Jeff Burton	Chevrolet	Richard Childress Racing
7	17	Matt Kenseth	Ford	Roush Fenway Racing
8	19	Elliott Sadler	Dodge	Gillett Evernham Motorsports
9	99	Carl Edwards	Ford	Roush Fenway Racing
10	44	David Reutimann	Toyota	Michael Waltrip Racing

Failed to qualify: Jeff Green (#34), Stanton Barrett (#50), Jon Wood (#21), Joe Nemechek (#78), Tony Raines (#08)

=== Best Buy 400 ===
The Best Buy 400 was held on June 1 at Dover International Speedway in Dover, Delaware. Greg Biffle won the pole. A wreck on lap 17 ruined the day for championship contenders Tony Stewart, Kevin Harvick, Denny Hamlin, Dale Earnhardt Jr., Clint Bowyer, and Kasey Kahne. The wreck occurred when Elliott Sadler made slight contact with David Gilliland, Sadler's car spun out and blocked traffic down the narrow backstretch. Polesitter Greg Biffle dominated the early laps leading 164 of them. Although an alternator problem on lap 170 forced Biffle to relinquish his lead to teammate Carl Edwards. Biffle switched batteries and kept going, although he was forced to leave the cooling fans off inside his car. In the final 153 laps there were no cautions allowing Kyle Busch to build a lead over 8 seconds to second place runner Carl Edwards. Busch took the lead from Edwards during green-flag pit stops that ended on lap 237. Only the top six cars managed to stay on the lead lap.

Top ten finishers
Pos.	Car #	Driver	Make	Team
1	18	Kyle Busch	Toyota	Joe Gibbs Racing
2	99	Carl Edwards	Ford	Roush Fenway Racing
3	16	Greg Biffle	Ford	Roush Fenway Racing
4	17	Matt Kenseth	Ford	Roush Fenway Racing
5	24	Jeff Gordon	Chevrolet	Hendrick Motorsports
6	1	Martin Truex Jr.	Chevrolet	Dale Earnhardt, Inc.
7	48	Jimmie Johnson	Chevrolet	Hendrick Motorsports
8	31	Jeff Burton	Chevrolet	Richard Childress Racing
9	22	Dave Blaney	Toyota	Bill Davis Racing
10	26	Jamie McMurray	Ford	Roush Fenway Racing

Failed to qualify: Jason Leffler (#70), Chad McCumbee (#45)

=== Pocono 500 ===
The Pocono 500 was held on June 8 at Pocono Raceway in Long Pond, Pennsylvania. Kasey Kahne won the pole, he went on to win the race. Starting with Pocono TNT started its six race broadcast schedule. Kyle Busch qualified tenth but in the second practice hit the wall and started from the back. He finished in last place after a crash with Jamie McMurray but had a big enough cushion in the standings to remain in first place overall in the series, 21 points over Jeff Burton.

Top ten finishers
Pos.	Car #	Driver	Make	Team
1	9	Kasey Kahne	Dodge	Gillett Evernham Motorsports
2	83	Brian Vickers	Toyota	Team Red Bull
3	11	Denny Hamlin	Toyota	Joe Gibbs Racing
4	88	Dale Earnhardt Jr.	Chevrolet	Hendrick Motorsports
5	31	Jeff Burton	Chevrolet	Richard Childress Racing
6	48	Jimmie Johnson	Chevrolet	Hendrick Motorsports
7	17	Matt Kenseth	Ford	Roush Fenway Racing
8	2	Kurt Busch	Dodge	Penske Racing
9	99	Carl Edwards	Ford	Roush Fenway Racing
10	8	Mark Martin	Chevrolet	Dale Earnhardt, Inc.

Failed to qualify: J. J. Yeley (#96)

NOTE: Tony Raines (#34) withdrew before the qualifying session.

=== LifeLock 400 ===
The LifeLock 400 was held on June 15 at Michigan International Speedway in Brooklyn, Michigan. Qualifying was cancelled because of rain after twelve drivers took times, and the field was set by the NASCAR rulebook. With a green-white-checkered finish extending the race, and fuel economy usage, Dale Earnhardt Jr. won his first points paying race in 76 attempts in the first win by a driver from North Carolina in a NASCAR Sprint Cup race since October 2006 at Talladega when Brian Vickers won; ironically, Vickers won for Earnhardt's new team, Hendrick Motorsports. It also marked the first time a Chevrolet has gone to victory lane in the last 14 Sprint Cup races there.

Top ten finishers
Pos	Car #	Driver	Make	Team
1	88	Dale Earnhardt Jr.	Chevrolet	Hendrick Motorsports
2	9	Kasey Kahne	Dodge	Gillett Evernham Motorsports
3	17	Matt Kenseth	Ford	Roush Fenway Racing
4	83	Brian Vickers	Toyota	Team Red Bull
5	20	Tony Stewart	Toyota	Joe Gibbs Racing
6	48	Jimmie Johnson	Chevrolet	Hendrick Motorsports
7	99	Carl Edwards	Ford	Roush Fenway Racing
8	6	David Ragan	Ford	Roush Fenway Racing
9	19	Elliott Sadler	Dodge	Gillett Evernham Motorsports
10	26	Jamie McMurray	Ford	Roush Fenway Racing

Failed to make race as qualifying was cancelled due to rain: Jason Leffler (#70), Tony Raines (#34).
NOTES: 1. Race extended three laps due to green-white-checkered finish.
2. The #87 Denver Mattress car driven by Kenny Wallace as well as the #08 car without a driver were withdrawn earlier in the week.

=== Toyota/Save Mart 350 ===
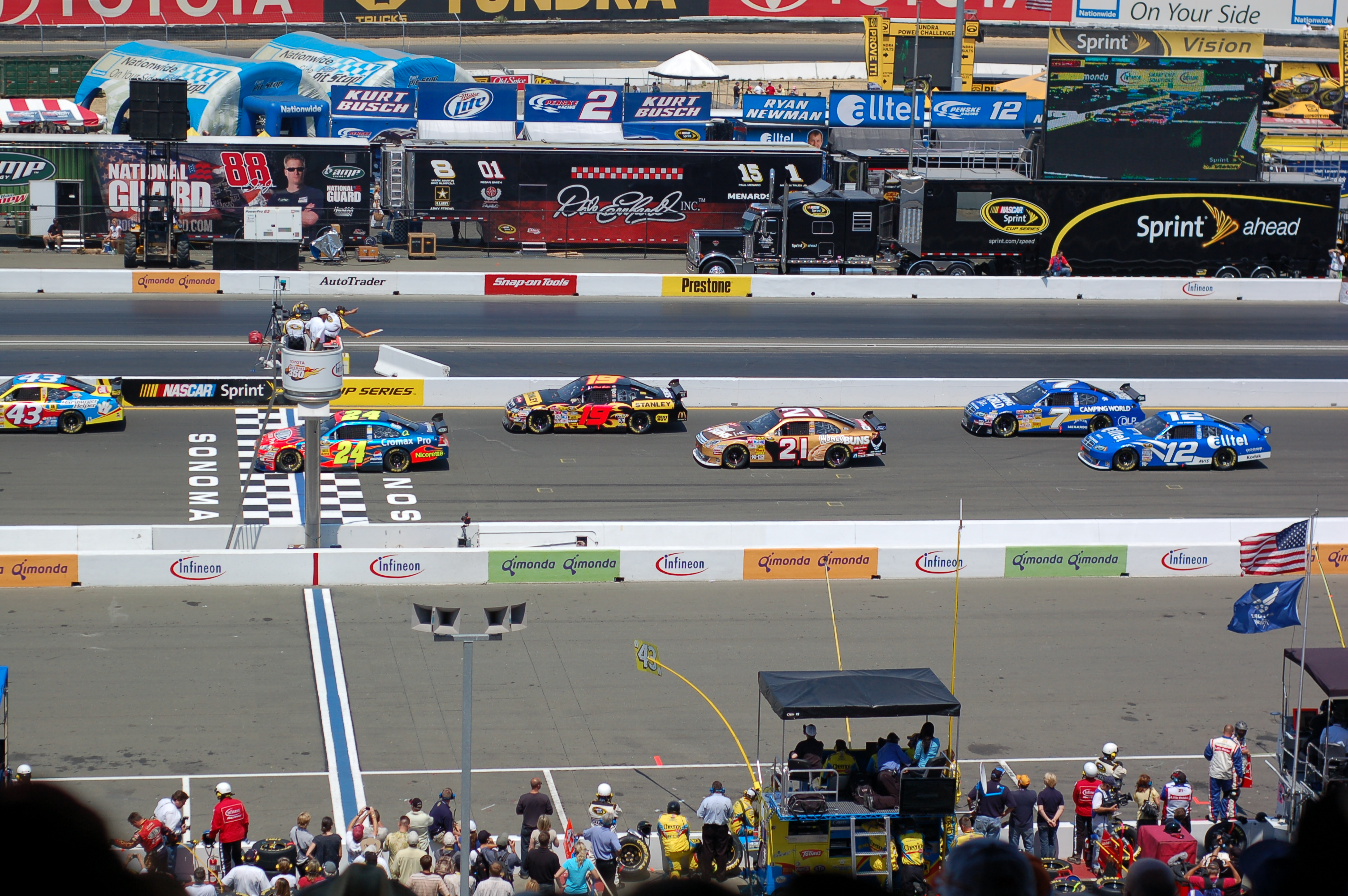
The drivers on a parade lap before the Toyota/Save Mart 350

The first of two road course races on the schedule, the Toyota/Save Mart 350, was raced at Infineon Raceway at Sears Point in Sonoma, California on Sunday, June 22. Kasey Kahne won the pole, but Kyle Busch dominated the field again starting from the 30th position and winning. Marcos Ambrose made his NASCAR debut. He started in 7th but finished in 42nd

Top ten finishers
Pos	Car #	Driver	Make	Team
1	18	Kyle Busch	Toyota	Joe Gibbs Racing
2	38	David Gilliland	Ford	Yates Racing
3	24	Jeff Gordon	Chevrolet	Hendrick Motorsports
4	07	Clint Bowyer	Chevrolet	Richard Childress Racing
5	5	Casey Mears	Chevrolet	Hendrick Motorsports
6	42	Juan Pablo Montoya	Dodge	Chip Ganassi Racing
7	12	Ryan Newman	Dodge	Penske Racing South
8	17	Matt Kenseth	Ford	Roush Fenway Racing
9	99	Carl Edwards	Ford	Roush Fenway Racing
10	20	Tony Stewart	Toyota	Joe Gibbs Racing

Failed to qualify: J. J. Yeley (#96), Scott Riggs (#70), Dario Franchitti (#40), Brandon Ash (#02)
NOTE: Race was extended by two laps due to green-white-checkered finish.

=== Lenox Industrial Tools 301 ===
The Lenox Industrial Tools 301 was raced on Sunday, June 29 at New Hampshire Motor Speedway in Loudon, New Hampshire. The big surprise was sprung in qualifying when following a rain delay of nearly two hours, Québécois Patrick Carpentier won the pole position over Bobby Labonte. Another big surprise was when Kurt Busch won the race, curtailed 17 laps shy of the scheduled distance as severe thunderstorms hit the area under the seventh and final caution.

Top ten finishers
Pos.	Car #	Driver	Make	Team
1	2	Kurt Busch	Dodge	Penske Racing
2	55	Michael Waltrip	Toyota	Michael Waltrip Racing
3	96	J. J. Yeley	Toyota	Hall of Fame Racing
4	1	Martin Truex Jr.	Chevrolet	Dale Earnhardt, Inc.
5	19	Elliott Sadler	Dodge	Gillett Evernham Motorsports
6	41	Reed Sorenson	Dodge	Chip Ganassi Racing
7	5	Casey Mears	Chevrolet	Hendrick Motorsports
8	11	Denny Hamlin	Toyota	Joe Gibbs Racing
9	48	Jimmie Johnson	Chevrolet	Hendrick Motorsports
10	43	Bobby Labonte	Dodge	Petty Enterprises

NOTE: Race was cut short to 283 laps due to rain.

Failed to qualify: Marcos Ambrose (#21), Tony Raines (#34)

=== Coke Zero 400 ===
The Coke Zero 400 powered by Coca-Cola was held on July 5 at Daytona International Speedway in Daytona Beach, Florida. Martin Truex Jr.'s car was seized by NASCAR, after the roof template would not fit during opening day technical inspection. Penalties of 150 owner and driver points penalties and a $100,000 fine along with his crew chief and his assistant (car chief) were both suspended for six races being announced on July 8. Paul Menard won the pole, the first of his Sprint Cup career. Tony Stewart became extremely ill on lap 73 and was replaced by former teammate J. J. Yeley. Kyle Busch won his sixth race of the season and the tenth of his career.

Top ten finishers
Pos.	Car #	Driver	Make	Team
1	18	Kyle Busch	Toyota	Joe Gibbs Racing
2	99	Carl Edwards	Ford	Roush Fenway Racing
3	17	Matt Kenseth	Ford	Roush Fenway Racing
4	2	Kurt Busch	Dodge	Penske Racing
5	6	David Ragan	Ford	Roush Fenway Racing
6	7	Robby Gordon	Dodge	Robby Gordon Motorsports
7	9	Kasey Kahne	Dodge	Gillett Evernham Motorsports
8	88	Dale Earnhardt Jr.	Chevrolet	Hendrick Motorsports
9	07	Clint Bowyer	Chevrolet	Richard Childress Racing
10	8	Mark Martin	Chevrolet	Dale Earnhardt, Inc.

NOTE: Race was extended two laps under a green-white-checkered finish.

Failed to qualify: Scott Riggs (#66), J. J. Yeley (#96)

=== LifeLock.com 400 ===
The second half of the season began with the LifeLock.com 400, held under the lights for the first time on July 12 at Chicagoland Speedway in the Chicago, Illinois suburb of Joilet. It also served as the conclusion of TNT's Summer Series schedule. Qualifying was cancelled due to rain, so the field was set by NASCAR's rulebook. Points leader Kyle Busch won his seventh race of the season.

Top ten finishers
Pos.	Car #	Driver	Car make	Team
1	18	Kyle Busch	Toyota	Joe Gibbs Racing
2	48	Jimmie Johnson	Chevrolet	Hendrick Motorsports
3	29	Kevin Harvick	Chevrolet	Richard Childress Racing
4	16	Greg Biffle	Ford	Roush Fenway Racing
5	20	Tony Stewart	Toyota	Joe Gibbs Racing
6	83	Brian Vickers	Toyota	Team Red Bull
7	17	Matt Kenseth	Ford	Roush Fenway Racing
8	6	David Ragan	Ford	Roush Fenway Racing
9	1	Martin Truex Jr.	Chevrolet	Dale Earnhardt, Inc.
10	12	Ryan Newman	Dodge	Penske Racing

Failed to make race as qualifying was cancelled due to rain: Johnny Sauter (#08) and Tony Raines (#34).

=== Allstate 400 at The Brickyard ===
The Allstate 400 at The Brickyard, kicking off ESPN and ABC's portion of the schedule, was run on July 27 at the legendary Indianapolis Motor Speedway in the Indianapolis suburb of Speedway, Indiana. Jimmie Johnson won the pole and then the race, which was slowed by nine out of eleven competition cautions because of extreme tire wear.

Top ten finishers
Pos.	Car #	Driver	Car make	Team
1	48	Jimmie Johnson	Chevrolet	Hendrick Motorsports
2	99	Carl Edwards	Ford	Roush Fenway Racing
3	11	Denny Hamlin	Toyota	Joe Gibbs Racing
4	19	Elliott Sadler	Dodge	Gillett Evernham Motorsports
5	24	Jeff Gordon	Chevrolet	Hendrick Motorsports
6	26	Jamie McMurray	Ford	Roush Fenway Racing
7	9	Kasey Kahne	Dodge	Gillett Evernham Motorsports
8	16	Greg Biffle	Ford	Roush Fenway Racing
9	31	Jeff Burton	Chevrolet	Richard Childress Racing
10	84	A. J. Allmendinger	Toyota	Team Red Bull

Failed to qualify: Bill Elliott (#21), Johnny Sauter (#08), Tony Raines (#34), Stanton Barrett (#50)

=== Sunoco Red Cross Pennsylvania 500 ===
The Sunoco Red Cross Pennsylvania 500 was held on August 3 of this year at Pocono Raceway in Long Pond, Pennsylvania. For the second straight week, Jimmie Johnson won the pole, but this time, it was Carl Edwards getting the win.

Top ten finishers
Pos	Car #	Driver	Make	Team
1	99	Carl Edwards	Ford	Roush Fenway Racing
2	20	Tony Stewart	Toyota	Joe Gibbs Racing
3	48	Jimmie Johnson	Chevrolet	Hendrick Motorsports
4	29	Kevin Harvick	Chevrolet	Richard Childress Racing
5	6	David Ragan	Ford	Roush Fenway Racing
6	07	Clint Bowyer	Chevrolet	Richard Childress Racing
7	9	Kasey Kahne	Dodge	Gillett Evernham Motorsports
8	8	Mark Martin	Chevrolet	Dale Earnhardt, Inc.
9	26	Jamie McMurray	Ford	Roush Fenway Racing
10	24	Jeff Gordon	Chevrolet	Hendrick Motorsports

Failed to qualify: Chad Chaffin (#34).

=== Centurion Boats at The Glen ===
The Centurion Boats at The Glen, the second and final road course race of the season, was held on August 10 at Watkins Glen International in the New York village of said racetrack. Qualifying was canceled due to rain, and the field was set by the rulebook. Kyle Busch swept both road races with his eighth Cup win and sixteenth overall in all three major series, and clinched the top position in the Chase for the Sprint Cup.

Top ten finishers
Pos.	Car #	Driver	Make	Team
1	18	Kyle Busch	Toyota	Joe Gibbs Racing
2	20	Tony Stewart	Toyota	Joe Gibbs Racing
3	21	Marcos Ambrose	Ford	Wood Brothers Racing
4	42	Juan Pablo Montoya	Dodge	Chip Ganassi Racing
5	1	Martin Truex Jr.	Chevrolet	Dale Earnhardt, Inc.
6	29	Kevin Harvick	Chevrolet	Richard Childress Racing
7	48	Jimmie Johnson	Chevrolet	Hendrick Motorsports
8	11	Denny Hamlin	Toyota	Joe Gibbs Racing
9	99	Carl Edwards	Ford	Roush Fenway Racing
10	2	Kurt Busch	Dodge	Penske Racing

Failed to make race as qualifying was cancelled due to rain: Boris Said (#60) and Brian Simo (#34).

=== 3M Performance 400 ===
The 3M Performance 400 was held August 17 at Michigan International Speedway in Brooklyn, Michigan. Team Red Bull's first pole position was earned by Brian Vickers in qualifying. A veritable parade of Roush Fenway Racing was led by race winner Carl Edwards, as four of the top five were all from the RFR stable and all five made the top ten.

Top ten finishers
Pos.	Car #	Driver	Make	Team
1	99	Carl Edwards	Ford	Roush Fenway Racing
2	18	Kyle Busch	Toyota	Joe Gibbs Racing
3	6	David Ragan	Ford	Roush Fenway Racing
4	16	Greg Biffle	Ford	Roush Fenway Racing
5	17	Matt Kenseth	Ford	Roush Fenway Racing
6	8	Mark Martin	Chevrolet	Dale Earnhardt, Inc.
7	83	Brian Vickers	Toyota	Team Red Bull
8	29	Kevin Harvick	Chevrolet	Richard Childress Racing
9	19	Elliott Sadler	Dodge	Gillett Evernham Motorsports
10	26	Jamie McMurray	Ford	Roush Fenway Racing

Failed to qualify: Johnny Sauter (#08).

=== Sharpie 500 ===
The Sharpie 500 was held August 23 at Bristol Motor Speedway in Bristol, Tennessee. Carl Edwards, the defending race champion, would start on the pole and in the process, wrapped up a position in the Chase for the Sprint Cup. He then would go on to win the race, but on-track fireworks ensued afterwards when runner up Kyle Busch, whom Edwards would pass with 30 laps to go on a bump and run, bumped Edwards on the cooldown lap. Edwards then turned Busch.

Top ten finishers
Pos	Car #	Driver	Car make	Team
1	99	Carl Edwards	Ford	Roush Fenway Racing
2	18	Kyle Busch	Toyota	Joe Gibbs Racing
3	11	Denny Hamlin	Toyota	Joe Gibbs Racing
4	29	Kevin Harvick	Chevrolet	Richard Childress Racing
5	24	Jeff Gordon	Chevrolet	Hendrick Motorsports
6	12	Ryan Newman	Dodge	Penske Racing
7	07	Clint Bowyer	Chevrolet	Richard Childress Racing
8	20	Tony Stewart	Toyota	Joe Gibbs Racing
9	17	Matt Kenseth	Ford	Roush Fenway Racing
10	6	David Ragan	Ford	Roush Fenway Racing

Failed to qualify: Jeff Green (#34), Johnny Sauter (#08), Patrick Carpentier (#10), Stanton Barrett (#50).

=== Pepsi 500 ===
The Pepsi 500 was held on August 31 at Auto Club Speedway in Fontana, California. As part of the 2009 NASCAR realignment, this became the final race to be held here on Labor Day weekend. In 2009, this race becomes part of the 2009 Chase for the Sprint Cup, taking over the spot occupied for the fall race at Talladega Superspeedway, and was to have concluded ESPN's portion of the television schedule. Jimmie Johnson took the pole position, and dominated the race to win.

Top ten finishers
Pos.	Car #	Driver	Make	Team
1	48	Jimmie Johnson	Chevrolet	Hendrick Motorsports
2	16	Greg Biffle	Ford	Roush Fenway Racing
3	11	Denny Hamlin	Toyota	Joe Gibbs Racing
4	29	Kevin Harvick	Chevrolet	Richard Childress Racing
5	17	Matt Kenseth	Ford	Roush Fenway Racing
6	99	Carl Edwards	Ford	Roush Fenway Racing
7	18	Kyle Busch	Toyoya	Joe Gibbs Racing
8	9	Kasey Kahne	Dodge	Gillett Evernham Motorsports
9	44	David Reutimann	Toyota	Michael Waltrip Racing
10	07	Clint Bowyer	Chevrolet	Richard Childress Racing

Failed to qualify: Tony Raines (#70).

=== Chevy Rock & Roll 400 ===
The final "regular season" race, the Chevy Rock and Roll 400, was scheduled to have been held on Saturday, September 6 at Richmond International Raceway in Henrico County, Virginia. However, Tropical Storm Hanna forced a postponement to Sunday, September 7 in the afternoon and television was moved from ABC to ESPN due to prior commitments to carry an WNBA game and an IndyCar Series race from Chicago, Illinois. This race set the field for the 2008 Chase for the Sprint Cup with the top 12 drivers becoming eligible, and having their points reset to 5,000 with a ten-point bonus for each win they earned in the first 26 races of the season. As Hanna canceled qualifying for the race, the field was set by rulebook.

Top ten finishers
Pos	Car #	Driver	Car make	Team
1	48	Jimmie Johnson	Chevrolet	Hendrick Motorsports
2	20	Tony Stewart	Toyota	Joe Gibbs Racing
3	11	Denny Hamlin	Toyota	Joe Gibbs Racing
4	88	Dale Earnhardt Jr.	Chevrolet	Hendrick Motorsports
5	8	Mark Martin	Chevrolet	Dale Earnhardt, Inc.
6	31	Jeff Burton	Chevrolet	Richard Childress Racing
7	29	Kevin Harvick	Chevrolet	Richard Childress Racing
8	24	Jeff Gordon	Chevrolet	Hendrick Motorsports
9	44	David Reutimann	Toyota	Michael Waltrip Racing
10	5	Casey Mears	Chevrolet	Hendrick Motorsports

Failed to make race as qualifying was canceled due to rain: Joey Logano (#02), Sterling Marlin (#09), Tony Raines (#34).

Drivers in green made Chase for Sprint Cup.

== Chase for the Sprint Cup ==
=== Sylvania 300 ===
The first race of the 2008 Chase, and the 27th race of the season, the Sylvania 300, was run September 14 at New Hampshire Motor Speedway in Loudon, New Hampshire. Qualifying was canceled due to rain, so for the second week in a row, NASCAR's rulebook set the field. While Kyle Busch suffered mechanical problems with a bad sway bar, Greg Biffle won his first race since last October. Joey Logano made his NASCAR debut, finishing 32nd

Top ten finishers (Chase drivers highlighted in yellow)
Place	Car #	Driver	Car make	Team
1	16	Greg Biffle	Ford	Roush Fenway Racing
2	48	Jimmie Johnson	Chevrolet	Hendrick Motorsports
3	99	Carl Edwards	Ford	Roush Fenway Racing
4	31	Jeff Burton	Chevrolet	Richard Childress Racing
5	88	Dale Earnhardt Jr.	Chevrolet	Hendrick Motorsports
6	2	Kurt Busch	Dodge	Penske Racing
7	1	Martin Truex Jr.	Chevrolet	Dale Earnhardt, Inc.
8	20	Tony Stewart	Toyota	Joe Gibbs Racing
9	11	Denny Hamlin	Toyota	Joe Gibbs Racing
10	29	Kevin Harvick	Chevrolet	Richard Childress Racing

Failed to make race as qualifying was canceled due to rain: Tony Raines (#34) and Carl Long (#46).
NOTE: The #02 car, which was to have been driven by Joey Logano was withdrawn as he was entered in the #96 ride.

=== Camping World RV 400 ===
The Camping World RV 400, the second race in the 2008 Chase and the 28th race overall, was run September 21 at Dover International Speedway in Dover, Delaware. Jeff Gordon won his third pole of the season, but it was Greg Biffle winning his second straight race.

Top ten finishers (Chase drivers highlighted in yellow)
Place	Car #	Driver	Car make	Team
1	16	Greg Biffle	Ford	Roush Fenway Racing
2	17	Matt Kenseth	Ford	Roush Fenway Racing
3	99	Carl Edwards	Ford	Roush Fenway Racing
4	8	Mark Martin	Chevrolet	Dale Earnhardt, Inc.
5	48	Jimmie Johnson	Chevrolet	Hendrick Motorsports
6	29	Kevin Harvick	Chevrolet	Richard Childress Racing
7	24	Jeff Gordon	Chevrolet	Hendrick Motorsports
8	07	Clint Bowyer	Chevrolet	Richard Childress Racing
9	31	Jeff Burton	Chevrolet	Richard Childress Racing
10	55	Michael Waltrip	Toyota	Michael Waltrip Racing

Failed to qualify: Chad Chaffin (#34), Johnny Sauter (#08), Stanton Barrett (#50).

=== Camping World RV 400 presented by Coleman ===
The Camping World RV 400 presented by Coleman, the third race in the Chase and the 29th overall this season, is scheduled for September 28 at Kansas Speedway in Kansas City, Kansas. Juan Pablo Montoya won his first NSCS pole for this race, however, he was disqualified and placed in the back of the field because of illegal shock absorbers that exceeded the maximum allowed by NASCAR, and Jimmie Johnson, who was second, was awarded the pole and went on to win the race.

Top ten finishers (Chase drivers highlighted in yellow)
Place	Car #	Driver	Car make	Team
1	48	Jimmie Johnson	Chevrolet	Hendrick Motorsports
2	99	Carl Edwards	Ford	Roush Fenway Racing
3	16	Greg Biffle	Ford	Roush Fenway Racing
4	24	Jeff Gordon	Chevrolet	Hendrick Motorsports
5	17	Matt Kenseth	Ford	Roush Fenway Racing
6	29	Kevin Harvick	Chevrolet	Richard Childress Racing
7	31	Jeff Burton	Chevrolet	Richard Childress Racing
8	6	David Ragan	Ford	Roush Fenway Racing
9	84	A. J. Allmendinger	Toyota	Team Red Bull
10	19	Elliott Sadler	Dodge	Gillett Evernham Motorsports

Failed to qualify: Michael McDowell (#00), Johnny Sauter (#08).

=== AMP Energy 500 ===
The AMP Energy 500, the fourth race in the 2008 Chase and the 30th overall in the season, was held on October 5 at Talladega Superspeedway in Talladega, Alabama. Tony Stewart won the race, his first victory of the 2008 season, ending a winless streak of 43 races. Travis Kvapil pulled off a "Talladega Surprise" and won the pole position. In a race that saw a record 64 lead changes among 28 drivers, Regan Smith crossed the finish line in first place. However, he was dropped to 18th place (the last position on the lead lap) for illegally passing eventual winner Stewart in the tri-oval by driving below the yellow line on the inside of the track, which is prohibited at restrictor plate tracks. This race will be moved to November 1, 2009 as part of the 2009 NASCAR Schedule Realignment and the Pepsi 500 at Auto Club Speedway will be run in this spot next season.

Top ten finishers (Chase drivers highlighted in yellow)
Place	Car #	Driver	Car make	Team
1	20	Tony Stewart	Toyota	Joe Gibbs Racing
2	15	Paul Menard	Chevrolet	Dale Earnhardt, Inc.
3	6	David Ragan	Ford	Roush Fenway Racing
4	31	Jeff Burton	Chevrolet	Richard Childress Racing
5	07	Clint Bowyer	Chevrolet	Richard Childress Racing
6	43	Bobby Labonte	Dodge	Petty Enterprises
7	66	Scott Riggs	Chevrolet	Haas CNC Racing
8	7	Robby Gordon	Dodge	Robby Gordon Motorsports
9	48	Jimmie Johnson	Chevrolet	Hendrick Motorsports
10	19	Elliott Sadler	Dodge	Gillett Evernham Motorsports

Failed to qualify: Patrick Carpentier (#10) Sam Hornish Jr. (#77).
NOTES: 1. The #08 car, which was to have been driven by Boris Said, was withdrawn earlier in the week.
2. Race extended two laps due to green-white-checker finish rule.

=== Bank of America 500 ===
The Bank of America 500, the sole night race on the Chase schedule which marks its halfway point and the 31st overall race of the season, was held Saturday night, October 11 at Lowe's Motor Speedway in the Charlotte, North Carolina suburb of Concord. Qualifying was cancelled due to rain and the field was set by the rulebook for the eighth time this season. Jimmie Johnson was the polesitter, while Jeff Burton won the race and became a contender in the 2008 Chase once again.

Top ten finishers (Chase drivers highlighted in yellow)
Place	Car #	Driver	Car make	Team
1	31	Jeff Burton	Chevrolet	Richard Childress Racing
2	9	Kasey Kahne	Dodge	Gillett Evernham Motorsports
3	2	Kurt Busch	Dodge	Penske Racing
4	18	Kyle Busch	Toyota	Joe Gibbs Racing
5	26	Jamie McMurray	Ford	Roush Fenway Racing
6	48	Jimmie Johnson	Chevrolet	Hendrick Motorsports
7	16	Greg Biffle	Ford	Roush Fenway Racing
8	24	Jeff Gordon	Chevrolet	Hendrick Motorsports
9	8	Mark Martin	Chevrolet	Dale Earnhardt, Inc.
10	6	David Ragan	Ford	Roush Fenway Racing

Failed to make race as qualifying was cancelled due to rain: Brad Keselowski (#25), Bryan Clauson (#40), Derrike Cope (#75), Scott Speed (#82).

=== Tums QuikPak 500 ===
The Tums QuikPak 500, race number six in the Chase for the Sprint Cup and the 32nd overall race of the season, was held on October 19 at Martinsville Speedway in Ridgeway, Virginia. Qualifying was cancelled due to rain, and the field was set by the rulebook for a record ninth time this season. Jimmie Johnson was the winner.

Top ten finishers (Chase drivers highlighted in yellow)
Pos.	Car No.	Driver	Car make	Team
1	48	Jimmie Johnson	Chevrolet	Hendrick Motorsports
2	88	Dale Earnhardt Jr.	Chevrolet	Hendrick Motorsports
3	99	Carl Edwards	Ford	Roush Fenway Racing
4	24	Jeff Gordon	Chevrolet	Hendrick Motorsports
5	11	Denny Hamlin	Toyota	Joe Gibbs Racing
6	5	Casey Mears	Chevrolet	Hendrick Motorsports
7	29	Kevin Harvick	Chevrolet	Richard Childress Racing
8	17	Matt Kenseth	Ford	Roush Fenway Racing
9	07	Clint Bowyer	Chevrolet	Richard Childress Racing
10	1	Martin Truex Jr.	Chevrolet	Dale Earnhardt, Inc.

NOTE: Race extended four laps due to green-white-checker finish rule.

Failed to make race as qualifying was cancelled due to rain: Sterling Marlin (#09), Derrike Cope (#75).

Following the race at NASCAR's Research and Development Center, an inspection found that Team Red Bull's #83 Toyota, driven by Brian Vickers, had sheet metal that was thinner than required. As a result, crew chief Kevin Hamlin and car chief Craig Smokstad were suspended indefinitely, Hamlin was fined $100,000 and the team lost 150 owner and driver points.

=== Pep Boys Auto 500 ===
The Pep Boys Auto 500, the seventh race in the Chase and the 33rd overall event this season, was scheduled to be raced on Sunday, October 26 at Atlanta Motor Speedway in Hampton, Georgia. As part of the 2009 schedule realignment, the race will be run in 2009 on Labor Day weekend and be replaced in the Chase schedule by the Pepsi 500 in Fontana, California while the date for this race will be used to run the AMP Energy 500 in Talladega, Alabama. For the third consecutive race and 10th overall this season, qualifying was cancelled because of rain, which meant Jimmie Johnson would be on the pole as NASCAR's rulebook set the field once again. Carl Edwards won his 7th race of the season.

Top ten finishers (Chase drivers highlighted in yellow)
Pos.	Car No.	Driver	Car make	Team
1	99	Carl Edwards	Ford	Roush Fenway Racing
2	48	Jimmie Johnson	Chevrolet	Hendrick Motorsports
3	11	Denny Hamlin	Toyota	Joe Gibbs Racing
4	17	Matt Kenseth	Ford	Roush Fenway Racing
5	18	Kyle Busch	Toyota	Joe Gibbs Racing
6	2	Kurt Busch	Dodge	Penske Racing
7	26	Jamie McMurray	Ford	Roush Fenway Racing
8	6	David Ragan	Ford	Roush Fenway Racing
9	24	Jeff Gordon	Chevrolet	Hendrick Motorsports
10	16	Greg Biffle	Ford	Roush Fenway Racing

Failed to make race as qualifying was cancelled due to rain: Joey Logano (#02), Bryan Clauson (#40)
NOTE: The #08 car, which was to have been driven by Johnny Sauter, was withdrawn earlier in the week.

=== Dickies 500 ===
The Dickies 500, the third-to-last race in the Chase and the season (race eight in the Chase and race 34 in the overall season) was held on November 2 at Texas Motor Speedway in Fort Worth, Texas. Jeff Gordon won his fourth pole of the year and his first at the track. Carl Edwards won his second consecutive race at the track making it his eighth win of the season. Brad Keselowski made his NASCAR debut, finishing 19th

Top ten finishers (Chase drivers highlighted in yellow)
Pos.	Car No.	Driver	Car make	Team
1	99	Carl Edwards	Ford	Roush Fenway Racing
2	24	Jeff Gordon	Chevrolet	Hendrick Motorsports
3	26	Jamie McMurray	Ford	Roush Fenway Racing
4	07	Clint Bowyer	Chevrolet	Richard Childress Racing
5	16	Greg Biffle	Ford	Roush Fenway Racing
6	18	Kyle Busch	Toyota	Joe Gibbs Racing
7	29	Kevin Harvick	Chevrolet	Richard Childress Racing
8	1	Martin Truex Jr.	Chevrolet	Dale Earnhardt, Inc.
9	17	Matt Kenseth	Ford	Roush Fenway Racing
10	44	David Reutimann	Toyota	Michael Waltrip Racing

Failed to qualify: Johnny Sauter (#08), Max Papis (#13), Bryan Clauson (#40), Chad McCumbee (#45), Tony Raines (#70)

=== Checker O'Reilly Auto Parts 500 ===
The Checker O'Reilly Auto Parts 500, serving as the penultimate Chase (ninth) and season (35th) race, was held on Sunday, November 9, at Phoenix International Raceway in Avondale, Arizona. Jimmie Johnson increased his Championship lead by winning the race and leading the majority of it. The race was delayed for just over an hour due to a light rain shower at lap 44, and a 9 car pileup on lap 273.

Top ten finishers (Chase drivers highlighted in yellow)
Pos.	Car #	Driver	Car make	Team
1	48	Jimmie Johnson	Chevrolet	Hendrick Motorsports
2	2	Kurt Busch	Dodge	Penske Racing
3	26	Jamie McMurray	Ford	Roush Fenway Racing
4	99	Carl Edwards	Ford	Roush Fenway Racing
5	11	Denny Hamlin	Toyota	Joe Gibbs Racing
6	88	Dale Earnhardt Jr.	Chevrolet	Hendrick Motorsports
7	29	Kevin Harvick	Chevrolet	Richard Childress Racing
8	18	Kyle Busch	Toyota	Job Gibbs Racing
9	31	Jeff Burton	Chevrolet	Richard Childress Racing
10	6	David Ragan	Ford	Roush Fenway Racing

NOTE: Race extended one lap due to green-white-checker finish rule.

Failed to qualify: Joe Nemechek (#78)

=== Ford 400 ===
The 2008 season and Chase for the Sprint Cup Championship ended at Homestead, Florida's Homestead-Miami Speedway with the final race of the season, the Ford 400 on November 16, 2008. Carl Edwards won his ninth race of the season. Also, after 14 straight seasons with at least one victory from 1994 to 2007, Jeff Gordon failed to keep his winning streak alive in 2008. It would be first time that he didn't win a race since his rookie year in 1993. His 14-season winning streak of at least one race came to a total of 81 wins. His best finish in the 2008 season was 2nd place twice (Martinsville in March, and Texas in November).

Top ten finishers (Chase drivers highlighted in yellow)
Pos.	Car #	Driver	Car make	Team
1	99	Carl Edwards	Ford	Roush Fenway Racing
2	29	Kevin Harvick	Chevrolet	Richard Childress Racing
3	26	Jamie McMurray	Ford	Roush Fenway Racing
4	24	Jeff Gordon	Chevrolet	Hendrick Motorsports
5	07	Clint Bowyer	Chevrolet	Richard Childress Racing
6	9	Kasey Kahne	Dodge	Gillett Evernham Motorsports
7	28	Travis Kvapil	Ford	Yates Racing
8	5	Casey Mears	Chevrolet	Hendrick Motorsports
9	20	Tony Stewart	Toyota	Joe Gibbs Racing
10	1	Martin Truex Jr.	Chevrolet	Dale Earnhardt, Inc.

Failed to qualify: Max Papis (#13) Sam Hornish Jr. (#77), Ken Schrader (#96)

== Results and standings ==
No.	Race	Pole position	Most laps led	Winning driver	Manufacturer	Report
	Budweiser Shootout	Kurt Busch	Dale Earnhardt Jr.	Dale Earnhardt Jr.	Chevrolet	Report
	Gatorade Duel 1	Jimmie Johnson	Dale Earnhardt Jr.	Dale Earnhardt Jr.	Chevrolet	Report
	Gatorade Duel 2	Michael Waltrip	Michael Waltrip	Denny Hamlin	Toyota	Report
1	Daytona 500	Jimmie Johnson	Kyle Busch	Ryan Newman	Dodge	Report
2	Auto Club 500	Jimmie Johnson	Jimmie Johnson	Carl Edwards	Ford	Report
3	UAW-Dodge 400	Kyle Busch	Carl Edwards	Carl Edwards	Ford	Report
4	Kobalt Tools 500	Jeff Gordon	Kyle Busch	Kyle Busch	Toyota	Report
5	Food City 500	Jimmie Johnson	Tony Stewart	Jeff Burton	Chevrolet	Report
6	Goody's Cool Orange 500	Jeff Gordon	Dale Earnhardt Jr.	Denny Hamlin	Toyota	Report
7	Samsung 500	Dale Earnhardt Jr.	Carl Edwards	Carl Edwards	Ford	Report
8	Subway Fresh Fit 500	Ryan Newman	Jimmie Johnson	Jimmie Johnson	Chevrolet	Report
9	Aaron's 499	Joe Nemechek	Tony Stewart	Kyle Busch	Toyota	Report
10	Crown Royal presents the Dan Lowry 400	Denny Hamlin	Denny Hamlin	Clint Bowyer	Chevrolet	Report
11	Dodge Challenger 500	Greg Biffle	Kyle Busch	Kyle Busch	Toyota	Report
	Sprint Showdown	Elliott Sadler	A. J. Allmendinger	A. J. Allmendinger	Toyota	Report
	Sprint All-Star Challenge	Kyle Busch	Kyle Busch	Kasey Kahne	Dodge	Report
12	Coca-Cola 600	Kyle Busch	Dale Earnhardt Jr.	Kasey Kahne	Dodge	Report
13	Best Buy 400 benefiting Student Clubs for Autism Speaks	Greg Biffle	Greg Biffle	Kyle Busch	Toyota	Report
14	Pocono 500	Kasey Kahne	Kasey Kahne	Kasey Kahne	Dodge	Report
15	LifeLock 400	Kyle Busch	Jimmie Johnson	Dale Earnhardt Jr.	Chevrolet	Report
16	Toyota/Save Mart 350	Kasey Kahne	Kyle Busch	Kyle Busch	Toyota	Report
17	Lenox Industrial Tools 301	Patrick Carpentier	Tony Stewart	Kurt Busch	Dodge	Report
18	Coke Zero 400 powered by Coca-Cola	Paul Menard	Dale Earnhardt Jr.	Kyle Busch	Toyota	Report
19	LifeLock.com 400	Kyle Busch	Kyle Busch	Kyle Busch	Toyota	Report
20	Allstate 400 at the Brickyard	Jimmie Johnson	Jimmie Johnson	Jimmie Johnson	Chevrolet	Report
21	Sunoco Red Cross Pennsylvania 500	Jimmie Johnson	Mark Martin	Carl Edwards	Ford	Report
22	Centurion Boats at The Glen	Kyle Busch	Kyle Busch	Kyle Busch	Toyota	Report
23	3M Performance 400 presented by Bondo	Brian Vickers	Carl Edwards	Carl Edwards	Ford	Report
24	Sharpie 500	Carl Edwards	Kyle Busch	Carl Edwards	Ford	Report
25	Pepsi 500	Jimmie Johnson	Jimmie Johnson	Jimmie Johnson	Chevrolet	Report
26	Chevy Rock & Roll 400	Kyle Busch	David Reutimann	Jimmie Johnson	Chevrolet	Report
Chase for the Sprint Cup
27	Sylvania 300	Kyle Busch	Jimmie Johnson	Greg Biffle	Ford	Report
28	Camping World RV 400 presented by AAA	Jeff Gordon	Matt Kenseth	Greg Biffle	Ford	Report
29	Camping World RV 400 presented by Coleman	Jimmie Johnson	Jimmie Johnson	Jimmie Johnson	Chevrolet	Report
30	AMP Energy 500	Travis Kvapil	Tony Stewart	Tony Stewart	Toyota	Report
31	Bank of America 500	Jimmie Johnson	Jimmie Johnson	Jeff Burton	Chevrolet	Report
32	Tums QuikPak 500	Jimmie Johnson	Jimmie Johnson	Jimmie Johnson	Chevrolet	Report
33	Pep Boys Auto 500	Jimmie Johnson	Matt Kenseth	Carl Edwards	Ford	Report
34	Dickies 500	Jeff Gordon	Carl Edwards	Carl Edwards	Ford	Report
35	Checker O'Reilly Auto Parts 500 presented by Pennzoil	Jimmie Johnson	Jimmie Johnson	Jimmie Johnson	Chevrolet	Report
36	Ford 400	David Reutimann	Carl Edwards	Carl Edwards	Ford	Report

=== Drivers' championship ===
(key) Bold - Pole position awarded by time. Italics - Pole position set by owner's points standings. * – Most laps led.

Pos.	Driver	DAY	CAL	LVS	ATL	BRI	MAR	TEX	PHO	TAL	RCH	DAR	CLT	DOV	POC	MCH	SON	NHA	DAY	CHI	IND	POC	GLN	MCH	BRI	CAL	RCH	NHA	DOV	KAN	TAL	CLT	MAR	ATL	TEX	PHO	HOM	Points
1	Jimmie Johnson	**27**	**2***	29	13	18	4	2	1*	13	30	13	39	7	6	6*	15	9	23	2	**1***	**3**	7	17	33	**1***	1	2*	5	**1***	9	6*	1*	2	15	**1***	15	6684
2	Carl Edwards	19	1	1*	42	16	9	1*	4	40	7	2	9	2	9	7	9	17	2	32	2	1	9	1*	**1**	6	13	3	3	2	29	33	3	1	1*	4	1*	6615
3	Greg Biffle	10	15	3	4	4	20	39	9	18	14	**43**	2	**3***	15	20	11	21	43	4	8	13	21	4	11	2	14	1	1	3	24	7	12	10	5	11	18	6467
4	Kevin Harvick	14	8	4	7	2	12	11	19	24	8	39	14	38	13	12	30	14	12	3	37	4	6	8	4	4	7	10	6	6	20	13	7	13	7	7	2	6408
5	Clint Bowyer	24	19	28	6	3	10	10	2	9	1	15	25	36	39	26	4	22	9	22	19	6	23	20	7	10	12	12	8	12	5	12	9	20	4	12	5	6381
6	Jeff Burton	13	12	5	10	1	3	6	6	12	11	10	6	8	5	15	13	12	37	19	9	21	17	11	42	17	6	4	9	7	4	1	17	18	13	9	40	6335
7	Jeff Gordon	39	3	35	5	11	**2**	43	13	19	9	3	4	5	14	18	3	11	30	11	5	10	29	42	5	15	8	14	7	4	38	8	4	9	**2**	41	4	6316
8	Denny Hamlin	17	41	9	15	6	1	5	3	3	**24***	7	24	43	3	14	27	8	26	40	3	23	8	39	3	3	3	9	38	11	39	16	5	3	17	5	13	6214
9	Tony Stewart	3	7	43	2	14*	5	7	14	38*	4	21	18	41	35	5	10	13*	20	5	23	2	2	12	8	22	2	8	11	40	1*	11	26	17	16	22	9	6202
10	Kyle Busch	4*	4	11	1*	17	38	3	10	1	2	1*	**3**	1*	43	13	1*	25	1	1*	15	36	1*	2	2*	7	15	34	**43**	28	15	4	29	5	6	8	19	6186
11	Matt Kenseth	36	5	20	8	10	30	9	38	41	38	6	7	4	7	3	8	18	3	7	38	11	12	5	9	5	39	40	2*	5	26	41	8	4*	9	15	25	6182
12	Dale Earnhardt Jr.	9	40	2	3	5	6*	**12**	7	10	15	4	5*	35	4	1	12	24	8*	16	12	12	22	23	18	11	4	5	24	13	28	36	2	11	20	6	41	6127
Chase for the Sprint Cup cut-off
Pos.	Driver	DAY	CAL	LVS	ATL	BRI	MAR	TEX	PHO	TAL	RCH	DAR	CLT	DOV	POC	MCH	SON	NHA	DAY	CHI	IND	POC	GLN	MCH	BRI	CAL	RCH	NHA	DOV	KAN	TAL	CLT	MAR	ATL	TEX	PHO	HOM	Points
13	David Ragan	42	14	7	23	21	11	13	27	4	17	5	12	15	24	8	24	40	5	8	14	5	30	3	10	13	32	28	18	8	3	10	13	8	11	10	24	4299
14	Kasey Kahne	7	9	6	28	7	17	25	36	23	10	22	1	31	**1***	2	**33**	30	7	15	7	7	14	40	40	8	19	11	26	21	36	2	33	33	24	13	6	4085
15	Martin Truex Jr.	20	6	15	21	13	21	36	8	37	5	14	34	6	17	17	16	4	17	9	24	15	5	16	35	19	16	7	20	43	41	14	10	15	8	43	10	3839
16	Jamie McMurray	26	22	25	40	43	8	14	17	17	35	11	23	10	20	10	18	41	32	21	6	9	16	10	12	24	29	39	36	17	32	5	38	7	3	3	3	3809
17	Ryan Newman	1	10	14	14	33	19	4	**43**	8	6	37	21	14	18	42	7	15	36	10	13	14	26	21	6	16	33	36	13	16	43	21	23	16	28	34	21	3735
18	Kurt Busch	2	13	38	11	12	33	23	23	39	42	12	16	20	8	21	32	1	4	28	40	38	10	36	15	39	10	6	34	30	21	3	36	6	41	2	43	3635
19	Brian Vickers	12	11	24	9	39	23	16	25	5	28	25	42	13	2	4	14	16	11	6	42	28	18	**7**	20	12	36	35	31	15	35	18	11	21	18	42	32	3580
20	Casey Mears	35	42	13	17	42	7	22	11	7	36	35	29	17	26	30	5	7	34	33	26	22	19	18	41	26	11	37	15	14	14	29	6	12	14	36	8	3527
21	Bobby Labonte	11	25	17	12	38	25	20	12	34	13	18	11	32	11	31	39	10	13	29	16	33	42	27	23	21	21	13	14	24	6	17	37	26	39	19	33	3448
22	David Reutimann	18	23	37	20	20	39	41	18	20	22	19	10	27	19	35	40	19	21	14	30	30	33	14	25	9	9*	15	17	19	37	32	24	28	10	25	**20**	3397
23	Travis Kvapil	30	28	8	29	27	18	18	22	6	16	8	26	11	23	16	22	36	31	41	36	16	36	13	24	28	17	16	23	34	**27**	42	19	23	32	21	7	3384
24	Elliott Sadler	6	24	12	43	19	15	26	41	29	20	42	8	42	34	9	19	5	39	12	4	27	15	9	32	34	37	24	27	10	10	20	41	25	35	30	28	3364
25	Juan Pablo Montoya	32	20	19	16	15	13	19	16	2	32	23	30	12	38	38	6	32	38	18	39	40	4	25	19	20	30	17	39	20	25	34	14	40	43	17	17	3329
26	Paul Menard	22	27	22	19	32	16	17	21	14	31	36	41	22	25	11	34	29	**15**	26	41	42	28	24	16	37	34	21	21	27	2	26	27	31	22	26	30	3151
27	David Gilliland	28	17	23	32	9	24	15	15	15	41	20	40	16	16	27	2	28	40	42	20	34	40	26	22	23	18	41	19	22	40	25	32	27	42	35	27	3064
28	Mark Martin	31	16	10	22			8	5		3	16	15	23	10	25			10	17	11	8*		6			5		4	18		9		22	12	14		3022
29	Michael Waltrip	29	28	31	30	23	35	31	24	27	37	24	27	28	37	23	25	2	27	36	43	43	39	19	30	33	28	25	10	35	19	24	18	37	27	24	38	2889
30	Dave Blaney	38	30	26	34	34	43	21	30	DNQ	18	9	17	9	22	39	20	33	19	23	35	31	41	41	38	29	22	33	12	31	22	27	22	41	29	20	22	2851
31	Scott Riggs	21	21	36	18	22	41	27	26	16	19	17	28	39	21	33	DNQ	34	DNQ	20	25	29	34	15	27	25	31	19	25	42	7	19	21	43	25	38	14	2797
32	Reed Sorenson	5	37	18	31	31	36	24	42	43	12	32	22	26	33	34		6	22	31	17	35	31	33	36	27	26	22	30	26	23	15	35	39	37	31	31	2795
33	Robby Gordon	8	18	42	24	24	40	30	29	11	26	33	43	19	36	40	36	26	6	25	33	37	27	37	39	40	42	26	22	37	8	30	40	19	36	28	26	2770
34	Regan Smith **(R)**	37	31	34	38	26	14	35	35	21	21	29	19	21	28	32		27	24	34	31	25	Wth	29	14	36	23	23	37	32	18	23	42	30	34	23	34	2672
35	Sam Hornish Jr. **(R)**	15	43	41	25	29	28	32	20	35	23	38	13	18	42	22	31	39	29	37	21	26	32	22	37	31	38	30	42	33	DNQ	22	34	24	23	33	DNQ	2523
36	A. J. Allmendinger	DNQ	DNQ	DNQ						30	39	27	20	37	12	19	37	43	42	13	10	19	11	28	34	14	43	38	16	9		43	15	14	26	16	11	2436
37	Joe Nemechek	41	34	DNQ	36	35	DNQ	37	40	**25**	29	31	DNQ	34	29	28	26	20	18	39	29	41	38	34	29	43	40	43	35	38	11	37	43	42	38	DNQ	36	1989
38	Patrick Carpentier **(R)**	DNQ	DNQ	40	35	DNQ	29	28	33	31	43	40	37	29	32	24	23	**31**	14	30	18		20	30	DNQ	18	25	31	41	29	DNQ							1794
39	Bill Elliott	DNQ	26		DNQ		34	34	31			30		33	31	36				35	DNQ	20			26		35	29		25		28	16	38	31	29	12	1528
40	Michael McDowell **(R)**						26	33	34	26	40	28	32	30	27	37	21	42	25	43	34	24	25				20	27	29	DNQ								1466
41	J. J. Yeley	25	29	27	37	25	27	42	39	DNQ	34	26	38	24	DNQ	41	DNQ	3	DNQ	24	28	39																1263
42	Aric Almirola					8	42			33							28	23					35		13	30		18			13		20				35	1075
43	Ken Schrader	DNQ	DNQ	21	DNQ	41	37	Wth		42	DNQ		33												21	41	27		33		16	38	28	35	30	27	DNQ	1040
44	Kyle Petty	34	38	32	41	28	DNQ		DNQ	32	27	41	36												34	38	24		40	41						39		879
45	Marcos Ambrose																42	DNQ			22		3	43		32			32	36				29	21	18	42	844
46	Terry Labonte														30	29	17	35	16	38	27	32		32							17							811
47	Tony Raines						DNQ						DNQ	40		DNQ		DNQ		DNQ	DNQ	18		31	17	DNQ	DNQ	DNQ	28	23	34	40	31	32	DNQ		37	800
48	Mike Skinner		DNQ	30	27	40	31	29	28															35	28	35					31	39						734
49	Dario Franchitti **(R)**	33	32	33	33	36	22	DNQ	32	QL^{†}					41	43	DNQ	38	Wth																			606
50	Jeremy Mayfield	23	39	16	39	30	32	38						25																								578
51	Sterling Marlin	DNQ								22	25	34	31						41						43						42					32	29	482
52	Chad McCumbee							DNQ						DNQ								17						42				35	25	36	DNQ		39	396
53	Johnny Sauter			DNQ					37		33	DNQ	35					37	28	DNQ	DNQ			DNQ	DNQ	42	41	20	DNQ	DNQ				Wth	DNQ	37		387
54	Dale Jarrett	16	33	39	26	37																																367
55	Scott Speed																															DNQ	30	34	33	40	16	366
56	Ron Fellows																29						13															200
57	Brad Keselowski																															DNQ			19		23	200
58	Boris Said	DNQ	Wth														41		35				24											Wth				194
59	Jason Leffler													DNQ	40	DNQ				27	32																	192
60	Jon Wood									36	DNQ		DNQ						33												33							183
61	Kenny Wallace	43	Wth												Wth																12							166
62	John Andretti	40	35	DNQ	DNQ	DNQ	DNQ	40	DNQ	DNQ	DNQ																											149
63	Mike Wallace																														30	31						143
64	Joey Logano																										DNQ	32		39				DNQ	40			113
65	Max Papis																35						43												DNQ		DNQ	92
66	David Stremme									28																												84
67	P. J. Jones									QL^{‡}													37															52
68	Scott Pruett																38																					49
69	Brad Coleman																							38														49
70	Mike Bliss																																39					46
71	Brian Simo																43						DNQ															34
72	Eric McClure	DNQ																																				
73	Jacques Villeneuve	DNQ																																				
74	Stanton Barrett	DNQ											DNQ								DNQ								DNQ									
75	Carl Long	DNQ																										DNQ										
76	Burney Lamar		DNQ		DNQ			DNQ																														
77	Johnny Benson				DNQ																																	
78	Jeff Green					DNQ						DNQ	DNQ												DNQ													
79	Scott Wimmer										DNQ																											
80	Brandon Ash																DNQ																					
81	Chad Chaffin																					DNQ							DNQ									
82	Bryan Clauson																															DNQ		DNQ	DNQ			
83	Derrike Cope																															DNQ	DNQ					
84	Kevin Lepage		Wth																																			
85	Matt Crafton													QL^{¶}																								
Pos.	Driver	DAY	CAL	LVS	ATL	BRI	MAR	TEX	PHO	TAL	RCH	DAR	CLT	DOV	POC	MCH	SON	NHA	DAY	CHI	IND	POC	GLN	MCH	BRI	CAL	RCH	NHA	DOV	KAN	TAL	CLT	MAR	ATL	TEX	PHO	HOM	Points
^{†} – Dario Franchitti had originally qualified for the race, but was replaced by David Stremme due to injuries sustained from a crash during the Nationwide Series race the day before.^{‡} – P. J. Jones qualified for Robby Gordon.^{¶} – Matt Crafton qualified for Robby Gordon.

Note:This list does not include exhibition races.

=== Deductions ===
The following drivers (and teams) were penalized both drivers and owners points for violations:

- Carl Edwards (#99 Roush Fenway Racing Ford) – 100 points plus 10 bonus points entering the 2008 Chase – Las Vegas (A post-race inspection found opened oil tank lid after UAW-Dodge 400.)
- Ryan Newman (#12 Penske Racing Dodge) – 25 points – Texas (Car was 1/8" higher than 1/4" tolerance following Samsung 500.)
- Scott Riggs and Johnny Sauter (#66 and #70 CNC Haas Chevrolets) – 150 points each – Charlotte (Illegal adjustments of wings on both cars; they drove their backup cars in Coca-Cola 600.)
- Martin Truex Jr. (#1 Dale Earnhardt, Inc. Chevrolet) – 150 points – Daytona (Roof on primary car failed inspection prior to Coke Zero 400; drove a backup car.)
- Brian Vickers (#83 Team Red Bull Toyota) – 150 points – Martinsville (A post-race inspection at NASCAR's R&D center found that the car had thinner sheet metal violated the rules following the Tums QuikPak 500.)

Robby Gordon was originally docked 100 points following the Daytona 500 for use of an illegal nose on his car; however, on March 5, the points were given back to his drivers and owners points total, but the team was fined $150,000 instead of $100,000 for said infraction.

== Manufacturers' Championship ==
Chevrolet won the NASCAR Manufacturers' Championship with 11 wins and 219 points for the season, over second place Ford who also had 11 wins, but only 215 points. Toyota finished third with 207 points, and Dodge fourth with 151 points.

== Rookie of the Year ==
The primary contenders for the Rookie title were Regan Smith and former Indy 500 winner Sam Hornish Jr. Smith became the first rookie driver to complete all races entered and nearly won the fall race at Talladega. Hornish meanwhile struggled to quickly adapt to stock cars but finished 7 points behind Smith. Canadian Patrick Carpentier missed the Daytona 500 but won the pole at New Hampshire. Road racer Michael McDowell ran 20 races for Michael Waltrip Racing. 2007 Indianapolis 500 winner Dario Franchitti managed to run the first 8 races before an injury during the Talladega Nationwide Series race, coupled with owner Chip Ganassi shutting down the No. 40 team, ended Franchitti's bid.

== See also ==
- 2008 NASCAR Nationwide Series
- 2008 NASCAR Craftsman Truck Series
- 2008 NASCAR Camping World East Series
- 2008 NASCAR Camping World West Series
- 2008 ARCA Re/Max Series
- 2008 NASCAR Whelen Modified Tour
- 2008 NASCAR Whelen Southern Modified Tour
- 2008 NASCAR Canadian Tire Series
- 2008 NASCAR Corona Series
- 2008 Chase for the Sprint Cup
- List of NASCAR all-time cup winners
- 2008 in sports
