= 2008 Budweiser Shootout =

Race details
- Race 1 of 2 Exhibition Races in the 2008 NASCAR Sprint Cup Series
- Date: February 9, 2008
- Location: Daytona International Speedway, Daytona Beach, Florida
- Course: Permanent racing facility
- Course length: 2.5 miles (4 km)
- Distance: 70 laps, 175 mi (281.635 km)
- Average speed: 140.751 miles per hour (226.517 km/h)

Pole position
Driver	Kurt Busch	Penske Racing

Most laps led
Driver	Dale Earnhardt Jr.	Hendrick Motorsports
- Laps: 47

Winner
No. 88	Dale Earnhardt Jr.	Hendrick Motorsports

Television in the United States
- Network: Fox Broadcasting Network
- Announcers: Mike Joy, Darrell Waltrip, and Larry McReynolds

The 2008 Budweiser Shootout was the first official, non-points paying event of the 2008 NASCAR Sprint Cup Series. The race was run on Saturday, February 9, 2008 at Daytona International Speedway in Daytona Beach, Florida and was restricted to those who were the fastest qualifiers in the 2007 season as well as past winners of the event. Dale Earnhardt Jr. won the event, his second shootout, and his first win with Hendrick Motorsports. Fox televised the race starting at 8 PM EST.

== Eligible drivers ==
There were two ways to become eligible for the Budweiser Shootout: win a pole or win the Budweiser Shootout. For 2008, there were 23 eligible drivers: nine drivers being past winners with lifetime exemptions into the race as long as they remain active in the series, and 15 who were fastest in qualifying for NEXTEL Cup races in 2007.

=== Past active winners (9) ===
- Bill Elliott
- Ken Schrader
- Jeff Gordon (who also won pole positions in 2007)
- Mark Martin
- Dale Jarrett (This was his last Shootout as he had announced his retirement from racing)
- Tony Stewart
- Jimmie Johnson (also won at least one pole in 2007)
- Denny Hamlin (also was a pole sitter in 2007)
- Dale Earnhardt Jr. (also was a pole sitter in 2007)

=== 2007 season pole sitters (14) ===
- David Gilliland
- Jamie McMurray
- Kasey Kahne
- Ryan Newman
- Clint Bowyer
- Carl Edwards
- J. J. Yeley
- Casey Mears
- Reed Sorenson
- Michael Waltrip
- Martin Truex Jr.
- Greg Biffle
- Dave Blaney
- Kurt Busch

== Starting lineup ==
The Budweiser Shootout lineup was determined by a draw of positions on Thursday, February 7, 2008 and aired live on Speed Channel.

1. (2) Kurt Busch°
3. (55) Michael Waltrip
5. (38) David Gilliland°
7. (88) Dale Earnhardt Jr.
9. (1) Martin Truex Jr.
11. (96) J. J Yeley
13. (49) Ken Schrader
15. (44) Dale Jarrett°
17. (16) Greg Biffle
19. (22) Dave Blaney
21. (07) Clint Bowyer
23. (12) Ryan Newman°

2. (8) Mark Martin
4. (26) Jamie McMurray
6. (41) Reed Sorenson
8. (9) Kasey Kahne
10. (20) Tony Stewart
12. (11) Denny Hamlin
14. (21) Bill Elliott°
16. (5) Casey Mears°
18. (48) Jimmie Johnson°
20. (99) Carl Edwards
22. (24) Jeff Gordon°

° — Because of the wrecks in Happy Hour, or other reasons, these drivers went to the rear of the field.

== Practice ==
The final practice session, commonly known as "Happy Hour" was anything but for many drivers as two separate incidents turned into a wreckfest thanks to the restrictor plate style of racing. The first, known as in the restrictor plate races as "The Big One", involved among others, Clint Bowyer, Ryan Newman, Jeff Gordon, David Gilliland and Jimmie Johnson, forcing them to backup rides. The second incident was more notable, with tensions boiling over from an incident during the Autism Speaks 400 the previous June at Dover, Tony Stewart accidentally brushed Kurt Busch, then slammed into the wall. The driver of the #2 Dodge retaliated en route to the garage area by bumping Stewart's #20 Toyota three times preventing en route to pit road getting to the garage area. Busch was forced into a backup car and forfeited his pole position, and both drivers were ordered to visit the NASCAR Sprint Cup trailer to discuss the incident, and ordered to stay away from one another before the race. It had been reported that Stewart punched out Busch after he was called as "fat" in the trailer. On February 12, 2008, both were placed on probation for six races.

== Race ==
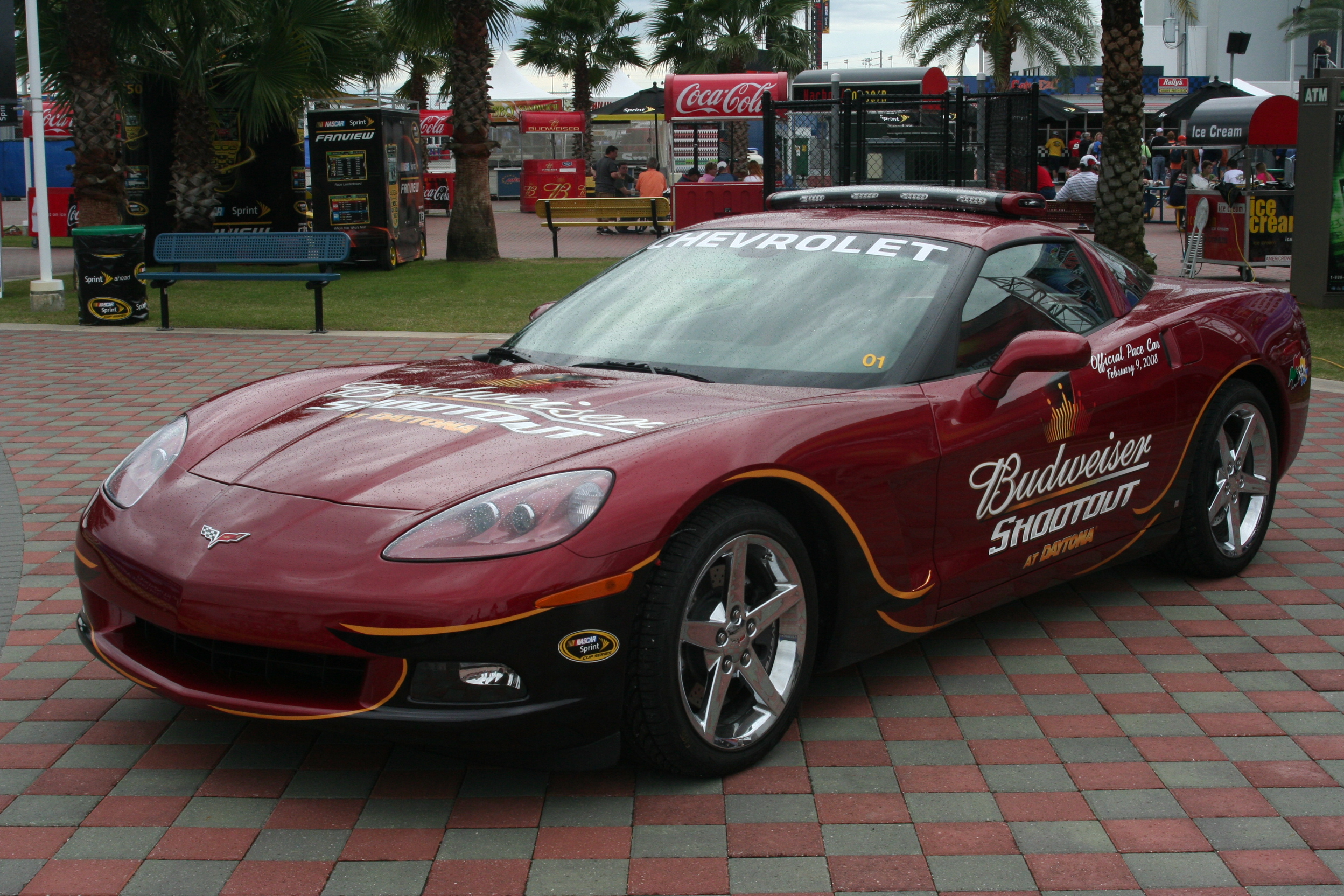
Pace car

The race was broken down into two segments: The first segment, which was 20 laps, followed by a ten-minute intermission, followed by a 50-lap segment, during which teams are required to make a green flag pit stop to change a minimum of two tires. Unlike points-paying races, all restarts are double-file with lead lap cars in the front, and work can be done during red flag periods. When all was said and done, Dale Earnhardt Jr. led an event record 46 of the 70 laps to win his first race with Hendrick Motorsports.

Top Ten Finishers
Pos.	Car #	Driver	Car Make	Team
1	88	Dale Earnhardt Jr.	Chevrolet	Hendrick Motorsports
2	20	Tony Stewart	Toyota	Joe Gibbs Racing
3	48	Jimmie Johnson	Chevrolet	Hendrick Motorsports
4	24	Jeff Gordon	Chevrolet	Hendrick Motorsports
5	41	Reed Sorenson	Dodge	Chip Ganassi Racing
6	5	Casey Mears	Chevrolet	Hendrick Motorsports
7	22	Dave Blaney	Toyota	Bill Davis Racing
8	8	Mark Martin	Chevrolet	Dale Earnhardt, Inc.
9	11	Denny Hamlin	Toyota	Joe Gibbs Racing
10	9	Kasey Kahne	Dodge	Gillett Evernham Motorsports

Casey Mears' #5 Chevrolet was deemed to be too low in a post-race inspection; it passed a second inspection following further evaluation the following day.
