= Slugger Labbe =

NASCAR crew chief

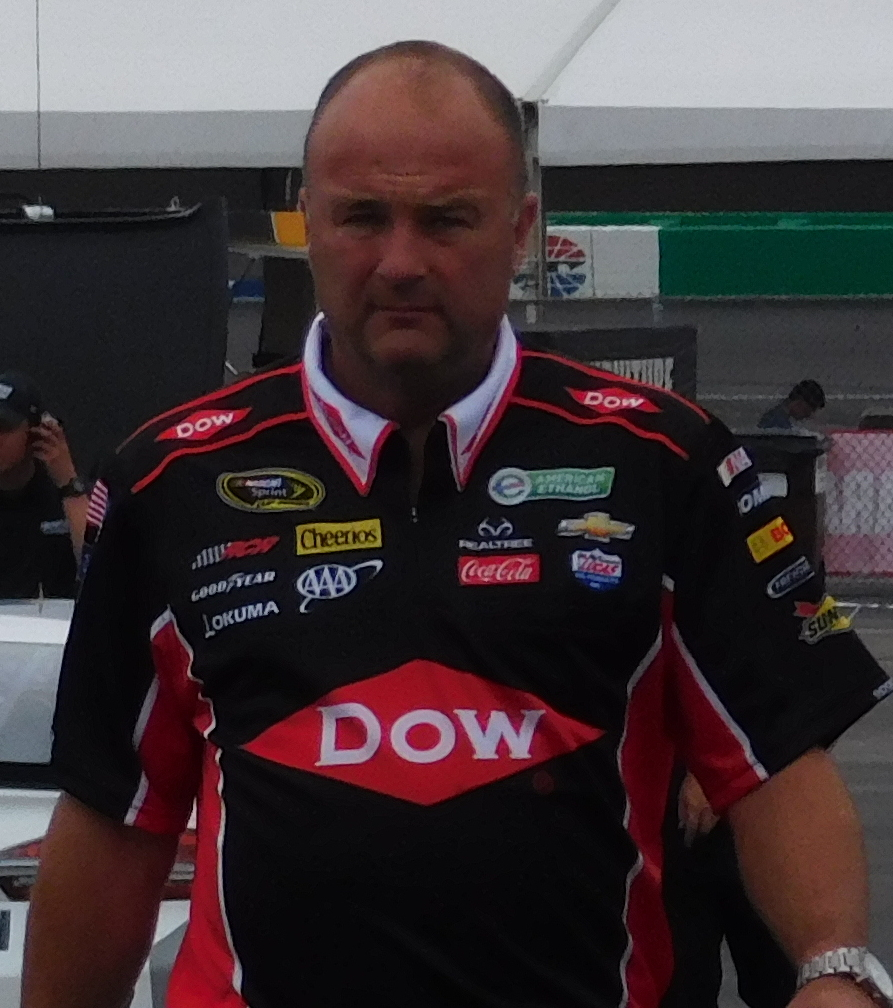
- Labbe at Kentucky Speedway in 2016

Personal information
- Full name: Richard Labbe
- Nickname: Slugger
- Born: June 14, 1968 (age 58) Saco, Maine, U.S.

Sport
- Country: United States
- Sport: NASCAR Camping World Truck Series, NHRA

Richard "Slugger" Labbe (born June 14, 1968) is an American technical consultant who currently works for Toyota Racing Development. He had previously been employed in NASCAR as a crew chief for Yates Racing, Dale Earnhardt, Inc., Richard Petty Motorsports, Richard Childress Racing and others. He has also previously served as an analyst for NASCAR on NBC.

== Early life ==
Labbe was born in Saco, Maine and introduced to racing at a young age. His father, Ray, worked on cars in the NASCAR Busch North Series and often brought his son to the events. In 1984 at the age of 15, Labbe began work on the crew of a Late Model stock car team. Two years later he began working in the NASCAR Busch North Series.

== NASCAR career ==
In 1989, Labbe moved to Hickory, North Carolina to compete in NASCAR’s Busch South Series. Working as a mechanic for NASCAR Busch Series driver Tommy Houston, the team finished second in the NASCAR Busch Series South championship.

In 1991, Labbe moved into the NASCAR Xfinity Series, working with driver Terry Labonte. In three seasons the team captured five victories. In 1994, Labbe joined Hendrick Motorsports, assuming the duties of front tire changer and mechanic for his No. 5 team in the Winston Cup Series. Labbe became the car chief in his second year with the organization and helped them win the Unocal pit crew championship and the NASCAR Cup Series championship in 1996.

In 1998, Labbe joined Robert Yates Racing (RYR) when he was offered the crew chief position for the No. 28 car driven by Kenny Irwin, Jr. He led the team for 29 races. Irwin, Jr. earned the NASCAR Cup Series Rookie of the Year Award that year. Labbe remained at RYR through 2000.

In September 2001, Labbe accepted a position with Dale Earnhardt, Inc. becoming the crew chief for the No. 15 car driven by Michael Waltrip. Labbe led Waltrip to three of his four Cup wins, and one Daytona 500.

In 2005, Labbe moved to Evernham Motorsports and served as crew chief for Jeremy Mayfield. The team won the race at Michigan International Speedway that year and qualified for a berth in the Chase for the Sprint Cup.

Returning to Yates Racing in 2006, Labbe worked with 1999 NASCAR Cup Series champion Dale Jarrett for the first 20 races of the season. Labbe missed four races that season due to a suspension handed down by NASCAR for an illegal sway bar mount. Labbe spent the first half of 2007 with Sterling Marlin at MB2 Motorsports but then headed to High Point, North Carolina and Bill Davis Racing for the second.

Labbe began the 2008 season working with Formula One champion Jacques Villeneuve helping him with the switch from open wheel to NASCAR before sponsorship fell through. He also took on a coaching role with NASCAR newcomer Scott Speed in the ARCA Racing Series presented by RE/MAX and Menards, the Camping World Truck Series, and the Sprint Cup Series. Labbe coached Speed to his first NASCAR Camping World Truck Series win at the spring event at Dover International Speedway. Later they earned their first pole at Bristol Motor Speedway that fall.

In 2009, Labbe moved to TRG Motorsports leading David Gilliland in the team’s first season in NASCAR Cup Series.

In 2010, Labbe was crew chief for the Richard Petty Motorsports (RPM) car driven by Paul Menard in his fourth full-season of Sprint Cup.

In 2011, Labbe and Menard departed the financially struggling RPM team to go race at Richard Childress Racing as a fourth team with the number being 27 and the sponsor being Menards. On July 31, 2011, Menard won his first career NASCAR Cup Series race at the Brickyard 400. The pairing remained together through at least 2013.

In 2015, RCR assigned Labbe as the new crew chief for Austin Dillon driver of the No. 3 Chevrolet SS, who previously had Gil Martin as crew chief.

== Post-NASCAR ==
On May 22, 2017, Labbe was relieved from his duties as being a crew chief of the No. 3 car. He was replaced by Justin Alexander, who won with the No. 3 team in his first race. Soon after, Labbe joined NASCAR on NBC as an analyst. In September 2017, he joined Toyota Racing Development in a vehicle support role. In 2018, he focused on Toyota's programs in the NHRA and NASCAR Camping World Truck Series.
