= 2008 Gatorade Duels =

Qualifying races for the 2008 Daytona 500

The 2008 Gatorade Duels were a pair of NASCAR Sprint Cup Series stock car races that were held on February 14, 2008 at Daytona International Speedway in Daytona Beach, Florida, United States. Both, contested over 60 laps, were the qualifying races for the 2008 Daytona 500. The first race was won by Dale Earnhardt Jr. for the Hendrick Motorsports racing team. Reed Sorenson finished second, and Ryan Newman clinched third. Afterward, the second race was won by Denny Hamlin. Tony Stewart followed in the second position, ahead of third placed Jeff Gordon.

The races set the field for the 50th running of "The Great American Race". These races are the only ones in the NASCAR Sprint Cup that qualifies drivers and their teams for a points-paying race. As qualifying only sets the front row for the Daytona 500, these races are formatted as follows:

- The pole sitter for the Daytona 500 (Jimmie Johnson) was on the point for the first race, with odd-numbered racers who have times in the first event, with the third-fastest driver sitting next to the pole sitter on the front row, then fifth- and seventh-fastest drivers in the second row, and so on.
- The second-fastest overall driver (Michael Waltrip) was the pole sitter for race two, with the fourth-fastest driver alongside in the front row, then the sixth- and eighth-fastest cars in row two, and so forth.

Positions three through 39 were filled that way (not counting the pole drivers in each race) along with the top drivers in each race not locked in from the previous season's Top 35, automatically qualify for the race. After that, the three fastest cars that did not qualify in the races along with a past champions provisional (if needed) completes the 43-car field. Had all past champions made the race, the next fastest car would have been entered into the field.

== Top Ten Finishers ==
Failed to qualify for the Daytona 500
Race 1	Race 2
84-A. J. Allmendinger	49-Ken Schrader
21-Bill Elliott	10-Patrick Carpentier
60-Boris Said	37-Eric McClure
09-Sterling Marlin	27-Jacques Villeneuve
08-Carl Long	50-Stanton Barrett

=== Race 1 and 2 ===
Top Ten Finishers
Race 1					Race 2				
Pos.	No.	Driver	Car Make	Team	Pos.	No.	Driver	Car Make	Team
1	88	Dale Earnhardt Jr.	Chevrolet	Hendrick Motorsports	1	11	Denny Hamlin	Toyota	Joe Gibbs Racing
2	41	Reed Sorenson	Dodge	Chip Ganassi Racing	2	20	Tony Stewart	Toyota	Joe Gibbs Racing
3	12	Ryan Newman	Dodge	Penske Racing	3	24	Jeff Gordon	Chevrolet	Hendrick Motorsports
4	5	Casey Mears	Chevrolet	Hendrick Motorsports	4	9	Kasey Kahne	Dodge	Gillett Evernham Motorsports
5	99	Carl Edwards	Ford	Roush Fenway Racing	5	8	Mark Martin	Chevrolet	Dale Earnhardt, Inc.
6	43	Bobby Labonte	Dodge	Petty Enterprises	6	6	David Ragan	Ford	Roush Fenway Racing
7	42	Juan Pablo Montoya	Dodge	Chip Ganassi Racing	7	29	Kevin Harvick	Chevrolet	Richard Childress Racing
8	87	**Kenny Wallace**	Chevrolet	Furniture Row Racing	8	16	Greg Biffle	Ford	Roush Fenway Racing
9	77	Sam Hornish Jr.	Dodge	Penske Racing	9	44	**Dale Jarrett**	Toyota	Michael Waltrip Racing
10	15	Paul Menard	Chevrolet	Dale Earnhardt, Inc.	10	34	**John Andretti**	Chevrolet	Front Row Motorsports

(NOTE: Race 2 extended to 64 laps due to green-white-checker finish.)

Also Making Daytona 500: 83-Brian Vickers (Toyota)

Drivers in boldface qualified for Daytona 500.
