= Chad Chaffin =

American racing driver (born 1968)

- Born: July 20, 1968 (age 58); Smyrna, Tennessee, U.S.
- Achievements: 1993, 1995 Nashville Speedway USA Track Champion

NASCAR Cup Series career
- 14 races run over 4 years
- Best finish: 46th (2006)
- First race: 2004 Subway 500 (Martinsville)
- Last race: 2007 USG Sheetrock 400 (Chicago)
| Wins | Top tens | Poles |
|---|---|---|
| 0 | 0 | 0 |

NASCAR O'Reilly Auto Parts Series career
- 83 races run over 10 years
- Best finish: 35th (2002)
- First race: 1993 Goodwrench 200 (Rockingham)
- Last race: 2006 O'Reilly Challenge (Texas)
| Wins | Top tens | Poles |
|---|---|---|
| 0 | 1 | 0 |

NASCAR FedEx Freight Truck Series career
- 116 races run over 9 years
- Best finish: 10th (2003, 2004)
- First race: 2000 Federated Auto Parts 250 (Nashville)
- Last race: 2008 Ford 200 (Homestead)
- First win: 2004 MBNA America 200 (Dover)
- Last win: 2004 Power Stroke Diesel 200 (IRP)
| Wins | Top tens | Poles |
|---|---|---|
| 2 | 29 | 2 |

ARCA Menards Series career
- 3 races run over 2 years
- Best finish: 85th (1999)
- First race: 1999 EasyCare Vehicle Service Contracts 100 (Charlotte)
- Last race: 2000 Pro2Call ARCA 200 (Daytona)
| Wins | Top tens | Poles |
|---|---|---|
| 0 | 0 | 0 |
- Statistics up to date as of November 29, 2012.

Chad Chaffin (born July 20, 1968) is an American stock car racing driver who competes part-time in the IHRA Stock Car Series.

Chaffin has raced in all three of NASCAR's major series. He was a two-time track champion at the historic Nashville Speedway USA, where he met his friend, Andy Kirby.

== NASCAR career ==
=== Sprint Cup ===
Chad made his Sprint Cup debut in 2004 at Martinsville. Driving the No. 98 MACH 1 Motorsports Ford, he ran 100 laps before experiencing a mechanical failure and finished in 39th place. In 2005, he attempted three races with Front Row Motorsports and MACH 1. Chaffin qualified for the Checker Auto Parts 500 at Phoenix and finished the race in the 43rd position after overheating issues. He began the 2006 season in the No. 92 Oak Gloves Chevrolet driving for Front Row Motorsports, however, he switched to the No. 34 Oak Gloves Chevrolet within the organization after two races. After another eight races, he yet again moved within FRM, this time to the recently acquired No. 61 team. Chaffin has currently made four of the fourteen races he has attempted, three in the No. 34 Oak Gloves Chevrolet and two cars with No. 61 team.

At the beginning of the 2007 season, Chaffin switched to the No. 37 R&J Racing car but was replaced by John Andretti before qualifying for a race. After Mike Bliss' resignation as the driver of the No. 49 BAM Racing Dodge on June 27, 2007, Chaffin was selected as one of the replacements with Larry Foyt. In his first attempt to qualify of the season at Loudon, Chaffin made the race after Brian Vickers and the No. 83 Team Red Bull Toyota were disqualified after failing post-qualifying inspection. In 2008, he attempted to qualify the No. 34 Chevrolet for Front Row Motorsports in the Pennsylvania 500 at Pocono and the Camping World RV 400 at Dover, but failed to qualify in either.

=== Busch Series ===
Chaffin's NASCAR career began in a 1993 Busch Series race at Rockingham. He drove three races in the No. 16 31-W Insulation Chevrolet with a best finish of 29th in his debut. In 1994, he again turned to the No. 16 and had a best finish of twentieth in seven races. During 1997, he ran one race in the No. 87 BellSouth Mobility Chevrolet and posted a finish of nineteenth at Nashville. Again in 1998 he ran one race, this time in a family-owned No. 84 Logan's Roadhouse Ford, where he finished 28th. In 1999, Chaffin made nine starts, three with his family-owned team and six with No. 77 Lear Corporation Ford featuring Tony Hall as the owner. He had a best finish of ninth at Richmond.

Chaffin made eighteen starts in 2000, all except for one in the No. 77 Lear Corporation Ford. He posted his best finish again at Richmond with an eleventh place. In 2001, he drove for Team Rensi Motorsports and Day Enterprise Racing. Making fourteen starts, he would have a best finish of sixteenth at Atlanta. 2002 was Chaffin's most active year in the Busch Series to date with 26 starts out of the 34 races. The majority of these starts came in the No. 16 31-W Insulation Chevrolet owned by Day Enterprise Racing. Although he struggled to finish many of the races because of mechanical failures he was able to achieve a best finish of 12th at Talladega. Chaffin was absent from the series for two years before returning for a race in 2005. He finished 36th in his only start during that year. For the 2006 season, Chaffin was expected to compete in up to fifteen events for Day Enterprise Racing in the No. 05 31-W Insulation Chevrolet, but ended up only making two starts for the team, then returned later in the year to make a single start for Sadler Bros. Racing. He has one career top-ten finish in over eighty starts.

=== Craftsman Truck Series ===
Chaffin first raced in the Craftsman Truck Series in 2000 with three teams. He raced the No. 84 Romeo Guest Associates Ford owned by Long Brothers Racing to his best finish of the season a third at Nashville. He returned in 2001 and again raced with Long Brothers Racing and had a best finish of fourth. In 2002, he started only two races as well and was unable to finish either in a family-owned car. For the next two years, he drove the No. 18 Dickies Dodge for Bobby Hamilton Racing, and had two wins in 2004 (Dover International Speedway and Indianapolis Raceway Park). He finished a career-best tenth in the final points standings in 2003 and 2004.

In 2005, Chaffin drove for three teams and competed in 21 of the 25 races. He began the season in the No. 30 Germain Racing Toyota and had a best finish of fourth before bring replaced by Todd Bodine. Despite being replaced, Wyler Racing selected Chaffin as their driver and he ran ten races with them placing ninth as his best finish. Jack Sprague then replaced Chaffin and he was left without a ride. He ran one final race in 2005 with No. 13 ThorSport Racing Chevrolet and finished thirteenth at Phoenix. For 2006, he was scheduled to drive the No. 40 Chevrolet for Key Motorsports in the opening races of the season, but has since left to focus on his Nextel Cup team. Ryan Moore, a Dale Earnhardt, Inc. development driver, has replaced him as of Charlotte. Chaffin made one start this season in the No. 02 Team Copaxone Chevrolet for Sutton Motorsports. It was announced on July 3 that Chaffin would drive the No. 59 Harris Trucking Ford for HT Motorsports after Steve Park's departure. In 2007 and 2008, Chaffin ran part-time in the No. 40 Chevrolet for Key Motorsports. In 22 combined starts, he earned two top-ten finishes.

== ARCA career ==
Chaffin's only attempt in ARCA came in 2000 with his own Chaffin Motorsports. The No. 92 Upstate Helicopters Ford, which was a '97 Thunderbird, qualified third for Pro2Call 200 at Daytona. He exited the race after a transmission failure on lap ten, leaving him in the fortieth position.

== Motorsports career results ==
=== NASCAR ===
(key) (Bold – Pole position awarded by qualifying time. Italics – Pole position earned by points standings or practice time. * – Most laps led.)

==== Sprint Cup Series ====
NASCAR Sprint Cup Series results
| Year | Team | No. | Make | 1 | 2 | 3 | 4 | 5 | 6 | 7 | 8 | 9 | 10 | 11 | 12 | 13 | 14 | 15 | 16 | 17 | 18 | 19 | 20 | 21 | 22 | 23 | 24 | 25 | 26 | 27 | 28 | 29 | 30 | 31 | 32 | 33 | 34 | 35 | 36 | NSCC | Pts | Ref |
|---|---|---|---|---|---|---|---|---|---|---|---|---|---|---|---|---|---|---|---|---|---|---|---|---|---|---|---|---|---|---|---|---|---|---|---|---|---|---|---|---|---|---|
| 2004 | Mach 1 Motorsports | 98 | Ford | DAY | CAR | LVS | ATL | DAR | BRI | TEX | MAR | TAL | CAL | RCH | CLT | DOV | POC | MCH | SON | DAY | CHI | NHA | POC | IND | GLN | MCH | BRI | CAL | RCH | NHA | DOV | TAL | KAN | CLT | MAR; 39 | ATL | PHO | DAR | HOM | 85th | 46 | |
| 2005 | Front Row Motorsports | 92 | Chevy | DAY | CAL | LVS | ATL | BRI | MAR | TEX | PHO | TAL | DAR | RCH | CLT | DOV | POC | MCH | SON | DAY | CHI | NHA | POC | IND | GLN | MCH | BRI | CAL | RCH | NHA | DOV | TAL | KAN | CLT | MAR; DNQ | ATL; QL^{†} | TEX | | HOM; DNQ | 88th | 34 | |
| 2005 | Mach 1 Motorsports | 34 | Chevy | | | | | | | | | | | | | | | | | | | | | | | | | | | | | | | | | | | PHO; 43 | | 88th | 34 | |
| 2006 | Front Row Motorsports | 92 | Chevy | DAY; DNQ | CAL; Wth | | | | | | | | | | | | | | | | | | | | | | | | | | | | | | | | | | | 46th | 553 | |
| 2006 | Front Row Motorsports | 34 | Chevy | | | LVS; 42 | ATL; DNQ | BRI; DNQ | MAR; 36 | TEX; DNQ | PHO; DNQ | TAL; 30 | RCH; DNQ | | | | | | | | | | | | | | | | | | | | | | | | | | | 46th | 553 | |
| 2006 | Front Row Motorsports | 61 | Dodge | | | | | | | | | | | DAR; DNQ | | DOV; DNQ | | MCH; DNQ | SON | | | | POC; DNQ | | | | | CAL; DNQ | RCH; 38 | NHA; 34 | DOV | KAN; 37 | | CLT; DNQ | MAR; DNQ | ATL | | PHO; 35 | | 46th | 553 | |
| 2006 | Front Row Motorsports | 61 | Ford | | | | | | | | | | | | CLT; DNQ | | POC; 33 | | | | | | | | | | | | | | | | | | | | | | | 46th | 553 | |
| 2006 | Front Row Motorsports | 61 | Chevy | | | | | | | | | | | | | | | | | DAY; 35 | CHI | NHA | | | | MCH; DNQ | BRI; DNQ | | | | | | TAL; DNQ | | | | | | | 46th | 553 | |
| 2006 | Front Row Motorsports | 34 | Dodge | | | | | | | | | | | | | | | | | | | | | IND; 39 | GLN | | | | | | | | | | | | TEX; DNQ | | HOM; DNQ | 46th | 553 | |
| 2007 | BAM Racing | 49 | Dodge | DAY | CAL | LVS | ATL | BRI | MAR | TEX | PHO | TAL | RCH | DAR | CLT | DOV | POC | MCH | SON | NHA; 36 | DAY | CHI; 31 | IND | POC | GLN | MCH | BRI | CAL | RCH | NHA | DOV | KAN | TAL | CLT | MAR | ATL | TEX | PHO | HOM | 63rd | 125 | |
| 2008 | Front Row Motorsports | 34 | Chevy | DAY | CAL | LVS | ATL | BRI | MAR | TEX | PHO | TAL | RCH | DAR | CLT | DOV | POC | MCH | SON | NHA | DAY | CHI | IND | POC; DNQ | GLN | MCH | BRI | CAL | RCH | NHA | DOV; DNQ | KAN | TAL | CLT | MAR | ATL | TEX | PHO | HOM | NA | - | |
^{†} - Qualified but replaced by Bobby Hamilton Jr.

===== Daytona 500 =====
| Year | Team | Manufacturer | Start | Finish |
|---|---|---|---|---|
| 2006 | Front Row Motorsports | Chevrolet | DNQ | |

==== Nationwide Series ====
NASCAR Nationwide Series results
| Year | Team | No. | Make | 1 | 2 | 3 | 4 | 5 | 6 | 7 | 8 | 9 | 10 | 11 | 12 | 13 | 14 | 15 | 16 | 17 | 18 | 19 | 20 | 21 | 22 | 23 | 24 | 25 | 26 | 27 | 28 | 29 | 30 | 31 | 32 | 33 | 34 | 35 | NBSC | Pts | Ref |
|---|---|---|---|---|---|---|---|---|---|---|---|---|---|---|---|---|---|---|---|---|---|---|---|---|---|---|---|---|---|---|---|---|---|---|---|---|---|---|---|---|---|
| 1993 | Day Enterprise Racing | 61 | Chevy | DAY | CAR; 29 | RCH; DNQ | DAR | BRI | HCY | ROU | MAR | NZH | CLT | DOV | MYB | GLN | MLW | TAL | IRP | MCH | NHA | BRI | DAR | | | | | | | | | | | | | | | | 66th | 222 | |
| 1993 | Day Enterprise Racing | 16 | Chevy | | | | | | | | | | | | | | | | | | | | | RCH; DNQ | DOV | ROU; 30 | CLT | MAR | CAR; 30 | HCY; DNQ | ATL | | | | | | | | 66th | 222 | |
| 1994 | Day Enterprise Racing | 16 | Chevy | DAY; 43 | CAR; 32 | RCH; DNQ | ATL; DNQ | MAR; DNQ | DAR | HCY; DNQ | BRI; 35 | ROU; 33 | NHA | NZH | CLT; DNQ | DOV | MYB; 32 | GLN | MLW | SBO; 22 | TAL; DNQ | HCY; DNQ | IRP; 20 | MCH | BRI | DAR | RCH | DOV | CLT | MAR | CAR | | | | | | | | 54th | 490 | |
| 1996 | Chaffin Motorsports | 84 | Ford | DAY; DNQ | CAR | RCH | ATL | NSV | DAR | BRI; DNQ | HCY | NZH | CLT; DNQ | DOV | SBO | MYB | GLN | MLW | NHA | TAL | IRP | MCH | BRI | DAR | RCH | DOV | CLT | CAR | HOM | | | | | | | | | | NA | - | |
| 1997 | NEMCO Motorsports | 87 | Chevy | DAY | CAR | RCH | ATL | LVS | DAR | HCY | TEX | BRI | NSV; 19 | TAL | NHA | NZH | CLT | DOV | SBO | GLN | MLW | MYB | GTY | IRP | MCH | BRI | DAR | RCH | DOV | CLT | CAL | CAR | HOM | | | | | | 89th | 106 | |
| 1998 | Chaffin Motorsports | 84 | Ford | DAY | CAR | LVS | NSV; 28 | DAR | BRI | TEX | HCY | TAL | NHA | NZH | CLT | DOV | RCH | PPR | GLN | MLW | MYB | CAL | SBO | IRP | MCH | BRI | DAR | RCH | DOV | CLT | GTY | CAR | ATL | HOM | | | | | 123rd | - | |
| 1999 | Chaffin Motorsports | 84 | Ford | DAY | CAR | LVS | ATL | DAR | TEX | NSV; DNQ | BRI | TAL | CAL | NHA | RCH; DNQ | NZH; DNQ | CLT | DOV | SBO; 31 | GLN | MLW; 27 | MYB; DNQ | | | IRP; 29 | | | | | | | | | | | | | | 55th | 752 | |
| 1999 | Day Enterprise Racing | 16 | Pontiac | | | | | | | | | | | | | | | | | | | | PPR; DNQ | GTY | | MCH; DNQ | BRI | DAR | | | | | | | | | | | 55th | 752 | |
| 1999 | PRW Racing | 77 | Ford | | | | | | | | | | | | | | | | | | | | | | | | | | RCH; 9 | DOV; 36 | CLT; DNQ | CAR; 31 | MEM; 15 | PHO; 39 | HOM; 22 | | | | 55th | 752 | |
| 2000 | PRW Racing | 77 | Ford | DAY; 35 | CAR; 18 | LVS; 38 | ATL; 37 | DAR; 24 | BRI; 16 | TEX; 32 | NSV; 26 | TAL; 26 | CAL; DNQ | RCH; 11 | NHA; 42 | CLT; 26 | DOV; 27 | SBO; 34 | MYB; 40 | GLN | MLW; 20 | NZH; 44 | PPR | GTY | IRP | MCH | BRI | DAR | RCH | DOV | CLT | CAR | MEM | PHO | | | | | 36th | 1373 | |
| 2000 | Team Rensi Motorsports | 25 | Chevy | | | | | | | | | | | | | | | | | | | | | | | | | | | | | | | | HOM; 26 | | | | 36th | 1373 | |
| 2001 | Team Rensi Motorsports | 25 | Chevy | DAY; 41 | CAR; 22 | LVS; 25 | ATL; 16 | DAR; 37 | BRI; 34 | TEX; 27 | NSH | TAL | CAL | RCH | NHA | NZH | CLT | DOV | KEN | MLW | GLN | CHI | | | | | | | | | | | | | | | | | 42nd | 967 | |
| 2001 | Day Enterprise Racing | 16 | Chevy | | | | | | | | | | | | | | | | | | | | GTY; 28 | | | | | | | | KAN; 33 | CLT | MEM; 22 | PHO | | | | | 42nd | 967 | |
| 2001 | Hensley Motorsports | 80 | Ford | | | | | | | | | | | | | | | | | | | | | PPR; 38 | | | | | | | | | | | | | | | 42nd | 967 | |
| 2001 | Day Enterprise Racing | 16 | Ford | | | | | | | | | | | | | | | | | | | | | | IRP; 20 | MCH | | | | | | | | | | | | | 42nd | 967 | |
| 2001 | Day Enterprise Racing | 16 | Pontiac | | | | | | | | | | | | | | | | | | | | | | | | BRI; 38 | DAR | RCH; DNQ | DOV | | | | | CAR; 41 | HOM | | | 42nd | 967 | |
| 2002 | Day Enterprise Racing | 16 | Pontiac | DAY; 40 | CAR; 32 | LVS; 40 | DAR; 36 | BRI; 40 | | | TAL; 12 | CAL; 34 | RCH | NHA | NZH | CLT | DOV | | KEN; DNQ | | DAY; 39 | | | | IRP; 23 | | | | | DOV; 42 | | | | | | | | | 35th | 1643 | |
| 2002 | Day Enterprise Racing | 16 | Chevy | | | | | | TEX; 34 | NSH; 39 | | | | | | | | NSH; 27 | | MLW; 25 | | CHI; 26 | GTY; 34 | PPR; 29 | | MCH; 39 | BRI; 19 | DAR; 40 | RCH; 39 | | KAN; 42 | CLT; DNQ | MEM; DNQ | ATL; 33 | CAR; 30 | PHO; 29 | HOM | | 35th | 1643 | |
| 2002 | SKI Motorsports | 30 | Chevy | | | | | | | | | | | | | | | | | | | | | | | | | | | | | | MEM; 42 | | | | | | 35th | 1643 | |
| 2004 | Moy Racing | 77 | Ford | DAY | CAR | LVS | DAR | BRI | TEX | NSH; DNQ | TAL | CAL | GTY | RCH | NZH | CLT | DOV | NSH | KEN | MLW | DAY | CHI | NHA | PPR | IRP | MCH | BRI | CAL | RCH | DOV | KAN | CLT | MEM | ATL | PHO | DAR | HOM | | NA | - | |
| 2005 | Day Enterprise Racing | 16 | Chevy | DAY | CAL | MXC | LVS | ATL | NSH | BRI | TEX | PHO | TAL | DAR | RCH | CLT | DOV | NSH | KEN | MLW | DAY | CHI | NHA | PPR | GTY | IRP | GLN | MCH | BRI | CAL | RCH | DOV | KAN | CLT | MEM | TEX; 36 | PHO | HOM | 133rd | 55 | |
| 2006 | Day Enterprise Racing | 05 | Chevy | DAY; DNQ | CAL | MXC | LVS | ATL | BRI | TEX; 36 | NSH; 22 | PHO | TAL | RCH | DAR | CLT | DOV | NSH | KEN | MLW | DAY | CHI | NHA | MAR | GTY | IRP | GLN | MCH | BRI | CAL | RCH | DOV | KAN | CLT | MEM | | | | 90th | 216 | |
| 2006 | Sadler Brothers Racing | 95 | Dodge | | | | | | | | | | | | | | | | | | | | | | | | | | | | | | | | | TEX; 33 | PHO | HOM | 90th | 216 | |
| 2008 | Jimmy Means Racing | 55 | Ford | DAY | CAL | LVS | ATL | BRI | NSH | TEX | PHO | MXC | TAL | RCH | DAR | CLT | DOV | NSH | KEN | MLW; DNQ | NHA | DAY | CHI | GTY | IRP | CGV | GLN | MCH | BRI | CAL | RCH | DOV | KAN | CLT | MEM | TEX | PHO | HOM | NA | - | |

==== Craftsman Truck Series ====
NASCAR Craftsman Truck Series results
| Year | Team | No. | Make | 1 | 2 | 3 | 4 | 5 | 6 | 7 | 8 | 9 | 10 | 11 | 12 | 13 | 14 | 15 | 16 | 17 | 18 | 19 | 20 | 21 | 22 | 23 | 24 | 25 | NCTC | Pts | Ref |
|---|---|---|---|---|---|---|---|---|---|---|---|---|---|---|---|---|---|---|---|---|---|---|---|---|---|---|---|---|---|---|---|
| 2000 | Long Brothers Racing | 84 | Ford | DAY | HOM | PHO | MMR | MAR | PIR | GTY | MEM | PPR | EVG | TEX | KEN | GLN | MLW | NHA | NZH | MCH | IRP | NSV; 3 | | | | | | | 55th | 350 | |
| 2000 | Bobby Hamilton Racing | 4 | Dodge | | | | | | | | | | | | | | | | | | | | CIC; 14 | RCH | DOV | | | | 55th | 350 | |
| 2000 | Team Rensi Motorsports | 61 | Chevy | | | | | | | | | | | | | | | | | | | | | | | TEX; 33 | CAL | | 55th | 350 | |
| 2001 | Long Brothers Racing | 84 | Ford | DAY | HOM | MMR | MAR | GTY | DAR | PPR | DOV | TEX | MEM; 4 | MLW | KAN | KEN | NHA | IRP | NSH; 14 | CIC | NZH | RCH | SBO | TEX | LVS | PHO | CAL | | 60th | 281 | |
| 2002 | Chaffin Motorsports | 87 | Ford | DAY | DAR | MAR | GTY | PPR | DOV | TEX | MEM; 32 | MLW | KAN | KEN | NHA | MCH | IRP | NSH; 31 | RCH | TEX | SBO | LVS | CAL | PHO | HOM | | | | 77th | 137 | |
| 2003 | Bobby Hamilton Racing | 18 | Dodge | DAY; 17 | DAR; 5 | MMR; 20 | MAR; 26* | CLT; 8 | DOV; 7 | TEX; 8 | MEM; 28 | MLW; 13 | **KAN**; 14 | KEN; 26 | GTW; 13 | MCH; 3 | IRP; 12 | **NSH**; 6 | BRI; 7 | RCH; 11 | NHA; 6 | CAL; 17 | LVS; 18 | SBO; 13 | TEX; 15 | MAR; 14 | PHO; 18 | HOM; 10 | 10th | 3143 | |
| 2004 | Bobby Hamilton Racing | 18 | Dodge | DAY; 13 | ATL; 9 | MAR; 10 | MFD; 31 | CLT; 30 | DOV; 1 | TEX; 5 | MEM; 9 | MLW; 2 | KAN; 9 | KEN; 5 | GTW; 4 | MCH; 11 | IRP; 1 | NSH; 12 | BRI; 29 | RCH; 22 | NHA; 16 | LVS; 16 | CAL; 11 | TEX; 16 | MAR; 30 | PHO; 30 | DAR; 15 | HOM; 15 | 10th | 3122 | |
| 2005 | Germain Racing | 30 | Toyota | DAY; 21 | CAL; 28 | ATL; 7 | MAR; 5 | GTY; 9 | MFD; 32 | CLT; 30 | DOV; 23 | TEX; 23 | MCH; 7 | | | | | | | | | | | | | | | | 26th | 2068 | |
| 2005 | Wyler Racing | 60 | Toyota | | | | | | | | | | | MLW; 17 | KAN; 15 | KEN; 33 | MEM; 28 | IRP; 21 | NSH; 20 | BRI; 23 | RCH; 27 | NHA; 9 | LVS; 16 | MAR | ATL | TEX | | | 26th | 2068 | |
| 2005 | ThorSport Racing | 13 | Chevy | | | | | | | | | | | | | | | | | | | | | | | | PHO; 35 | HOM | 26th | 2068 | |
| 2006 | Key Motorsports | 40 | Chevy | DAY; DNQ | CAL; 18 | ATL; DNQ | MAR; DNQ | GTY; 26 | CLT; DNQ | MFD | DOV | TEX | MCH | MLW | KAN | | | | | | | | | | | | | | 28th | 1566 | |
| 2006 | Sutton Motorsports | 02 | Chevy | | | ATL; 21 | | | | | | | | | | | | | | | | | | | | | | | 28th | 1566 | |
| 2006 | HT Motorsports | 59 | Ford | | | | | | | | | | | | | KEN; 17 | MEM; 29 | IRP; 32 | NSH; 15 | BRI; 11 | | | | | | | | | 28th | 1566 | |
| 2006 | HT Motorsports | 59 | Toyota | | | | | | | | | | | | | | | | | | NHA; 27 | LVS; 25 | TAL; 8 | MAR; 11 | ATL; 32 | TEX; 19 | PHO; 23 | HOM; 36 | 28th | 1566 | |
| 2007 | Key Motorsports | 40 | Chevy | DAY | CAL | ATL | MAR | KAN | CLT | MFD | DOV | TEX | MCH | MLW | MEM | KEN | IRP | NSH | BRI | GTW | NHA; 36 | LVS; 16 | TAL; 8 | MAR; 7 | ATL; 36 | TEX; 24 | PHO; 22 | HOM; 30 | 39th | 774 | |
| 2008 | Key Motorsports | 40 | Chevy | DAY; 36 | CAL; 28 | ATL; 25 | MAR; 22 | KAN; 17 | CLT; 21 | MFD; 19 | DOV; 21 | TEX; 25 | MCH; 27 | MLW | MEM; 23 | KEN; 23 | IRP; 13 | NSH | BRI | GTW | NHA | LVS | TAL | MAR | ATL | TEX | PHO | HOM; 28 | 26th | 1303 | |

=== ARCA Bondo/Mar-Hyde Series ===
(key) (Bold – Pole position awarded by qualifying time. Italics – Pole position earned by points standings or practice time. * – Most laps led.)

ARCA Bondo/Mar-Hyde Series results
| Year | Team | No. | Make | 1 | 2 | 3 | 4 | 5 | 6 | 7 | 8 | 9 | 10 | 11 | 12 | 13 | 14 | 15 | 16 | 17 | 18 | 19 | 20 | 21 | ABSC | Pts | Ref |
|---|---|---|---|---|---|---|---|---|---|---|---|---|---|---|---|---|---|---|---|---|---|---|---|---|---|---|---|
| 1999 | Chaffin Motorsports | 92 | Ford | DAY | ATL | SLM | AND | CLT | MCH | POC | TOL | SBS | BLN | POC | KIL | FRS | FLM | ISF | WIN | DSF | SLM | CLT; 11 | TAL | ATL; 38 | 85th | 215 | |
| 2000 | Chaffin Motorsports | 92 | Ford | DAY; 40 | SLM | AND | CLT | KIL | FRS | MCH | POC | TOL | KEN | BLN | POC | WIN | ISF | KEN | DSF | SLM | CLT | TAL | ATL | | 142nd | 45 | |

=== IHRA Pro Late Model Series ===
(key) (Bold – Pole position awarded by qualifying time. Italics – Pole position earned by points standings or practice time. * – Most laps led. ** – All laps led.)

IHRA Pro Late Model Series
| Year | Team | No. | Make | 1 | 2 | 3 | ISCSS | Pts | Ref |
|---|---|---|---|---|---|---|---|---|---|
| 2026 | Chaffin Motorsports | 3C | Dodge | DUB | CDL; 17 | AND | N/A | 0 | |
