= 2006 DirecTV 500 =

Race details
- Race 6 of 36 in the 2006 NASCAR Nextel Cup Series season
- 2006 DirecTV 500 program cover
- Date: April 2, 2006
- Location: Martinsville Speedway, Ridgeway, Virginia
- Course: Permanent racing facility
- Course length: 0.526 miles (0.847 km)
- Distance: 500 laps, 263 mi (423.257 km)
- Weather: Temperatures reaching up to 80.6 °F (27.0 °C); wind speeds up to 7 miles per hour (11 km/h)
- Average speed: 72.741 miles per hour (117.065 km/h)
- Attendance: 65,000

Pole position
Driver	Jimmie Johnson	Hendrick Motorsports
- Time: 19.575

Most laps led
Driver	Tony Stewart	Joe Gibbs Racing
- Laps: 288

Winner
No. 20	Tony Stewart	Joe Gibbs Racing

Television in the United States
- Network: Fox
- Announcers: Mike Joy, Darrell Waltrip, and Larry McReynolds

The 2006 DirecTV 500 was the sixth race of the 2006 NASCAR Nextel Cup season. It was held on April 2, 2006 at Martinsville Speedway in Ridgeway, Virginia. Jimmie Johnson won the pole and Tony Stewart led the most laps and won the race.

== Background ==
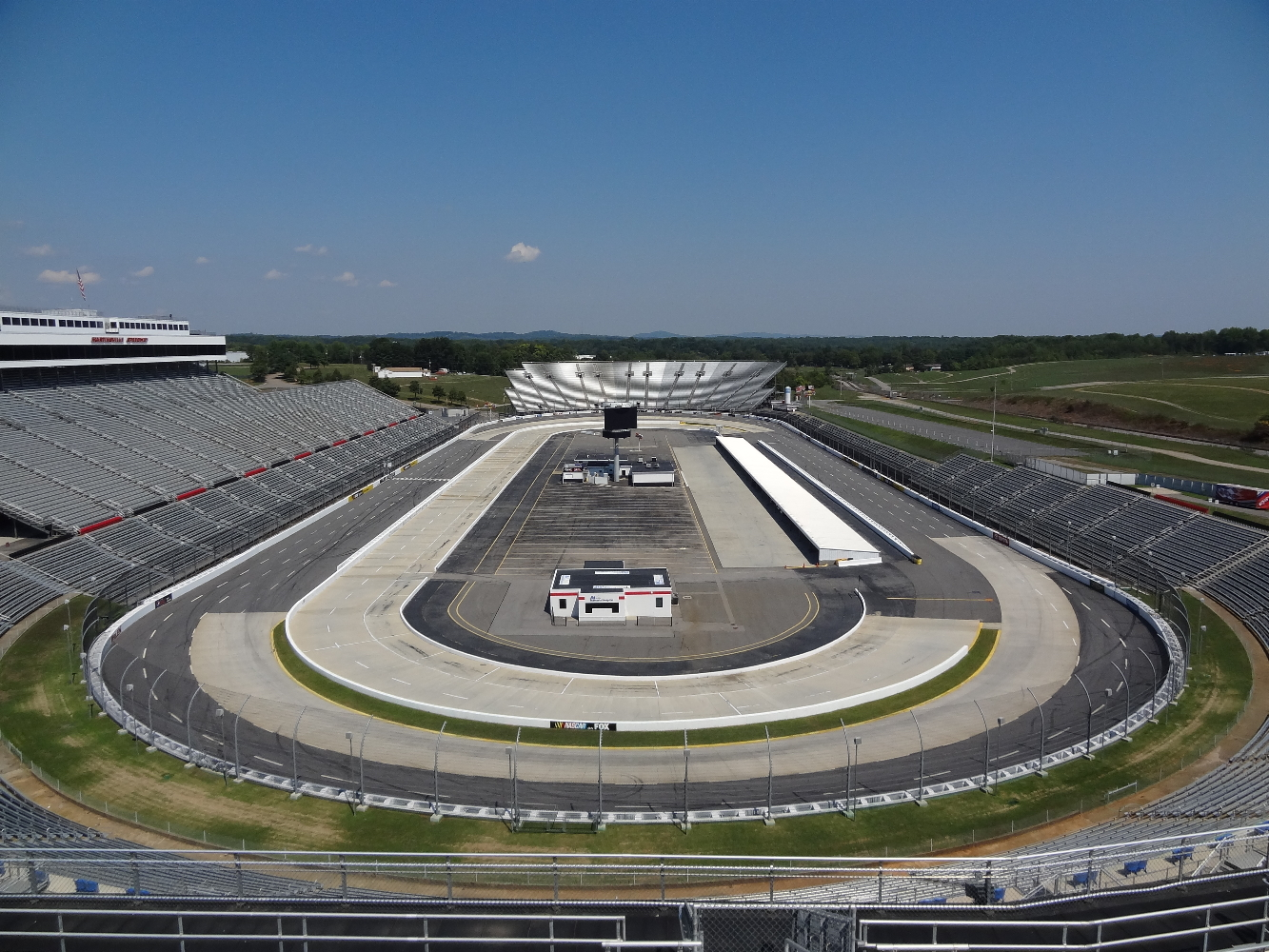
Martinsville Speedway, the race track where the race was held.

Martinsville Speedway is a 4-turn short track that is 0.526 miles (0.847 km) long. Its turns are banked at 11° while the frontstretch, where the start/finish line is located, is banked 0°. Like the front stretch, the backstraightaway also does not have a banked surface.

At 0.526 miles (0.847 km), Martinsville Speedway is the shortest track on the NASCAR Cup Series circuit. The track's layout, characterized by two long straights and tight, flat turns, is frequently compared to shape of a paperclip. Due to its compact dimensions, the venue provides seating in close proximity to the racing surface, with the cars remaining within view of the entire grandstand throughout the event.

In a recent poll of race fans by a major publication, Martinsville Speedway was voted as the top bargain in all of Sprint Cup racing as well as the track having the best view of the action. The track is also one of the most modern, with high-rise aluminum chair back seating, corporate and fan suites and state-of-the-art facilities for the media.

The race track was built in 1947 and is owned by the International Speedway Corporation.

The race consisted of 500 laps, equivalent to a race distance of 263 miles (423 km). Jeff Gordon was the defending race winner, after he won the race in 2005, the previous year.

== Qualifying ==
St	No.	Driver	Make	Speed	Time	Behind
1	48	Jimmie Johnson	Chevrolet	96.736	19.575	0.000
2	26	Jamie McMurray	Ford	96.696	19.583	00.008
3	20	Tony Stewart	Chevrolet	96.632	19.596	00.021
4	12	Ryan Newman	Dodge	96.563	19.610	00.035
5	9	Kasey Kahne	Dodge	96.509	19.621	00.046
6	14	Sterling Marlin	Chevrolet	96.484	19.626	00.051
7	38	Elliott Sadler	Ford	96.445	19.634	00.059
8	24	Jeff Gordon	Chevrolet	96.288	19.666	00.091
9	2	Kurt Busch	Dodge	96.117	19.701	00.126
10	16	Greg Biffle	Ford	95.976	19.730	00.155
11	10	Scott Riggs	Dodge	95.864	19.753	00.178
12	96	Tony Raines	Chevrolet	95.830	19.760	00.185
13	43	Bobby Labonte	Dodge	95.786	19.769	00.194
14	22	Dave Blaney	Dodge	95.752	19.776	00.201
15	99	Carl Edwards	Ford	95.670	19.793	00.218
16	17	Matt Kenseth	Ford	95.632	19.801	00.226
17	5	Kyle Busch	Chevrolet	95.603	19.807	00.232
18	18	J. J. Yeley	Chevrolet	95.530	19.822	00.247
19	21	Ken Schrader	Ford	95.487	19.831	00.256
20	31	Jeff Burton	Chevrolet	95.443	19.840	00.265
21	1	Martin Truex Jr	Chevrolet	95.357	19.858	00.283
22	01	Joe Nemechek	Chevrolet	95.275	19.875	00.300
23	19	Jeremy Mayfield	Dodge	95.271	19.876	00.301
24	25	Brian Vickers	Chevrolet	95.218	19.887	00.312
25	41	Reed Sorenson	Dodge	95.146	19.902	00.327
26	29	Kevin Harvick	Chevrolet	95.132	19.905	00.330
27	7	Robby Gordon	Chevrolet	95.065	19.919	00.344
28	88	Dale Jarrett	Ford	95.017	19.929	00.354
29	8	Dale Earnhardt Jr	Chevrolet	94.855	19.963	00.388
30	6	Mark Martin	Ford	94.708	19.994	00.419
31	34	Chad Chaffin	Chevrolet	94.543	20.029	00.454
32	42	Casey Mears	Dodge	94.538	20.030	00.455
33	55	Michael Waltrip	Dodge	94.505	20.037	00.462
34	66	Jeff Green	Chevrolet	94.463	20.046	00.471
35	95	Stanton Barrett	Chevrolet	94.458	20.047	00.472
36	4	Scott Wimmer	Chevrolet	94.444	20.050	00.475
37	45	Kyle Petty	Dodge	94.214	20.099	00.524
38	40	David Stremme	Dodge	94.200	20.102	00.527
39	51	Mike Garvey	Chevrolet	94.106	20.122	00.547
40	32	Travis Kvapil	Chevrolet	94.087	20.126	00.551
41	11	Denny Hamlin	Chevrolet	93.915	20.163	00.588
42	07	Clint Bowyer	Chevrolet	93.673	20.215	00.640
43	92	Chad Blount	Dodge	94.017	20.141	00.566
Failed to qualify
44	74	Derrike Cope	Dodge			
45	61	Kevin Lepage	Ford			
46	78	Kenny Wallace	Chevrolet			
47	49	Jimmy Spencer	Dodge			
48	89	Morgan Shepherd	Dodge			
49	00	Hermie Sadler	Ford			

== Race results ==
Pos	Grid	No.	Driver	Make	Points	Bonus	Laps	Winnings
1	3	20	Tony Stewart	Chevrolet	190	10	500	$220,786
2	8	24	Jeff Gordon	Chevrolet	170	0	500	$153,461
3	1	48	Jimmie Johnson	Chevrolet	170	5	500	$150,361
4	29	8	Dale Earnhardt Jr.	Chevrolet	160	0	500	$133,416
5	17	5	Kyle Busch	Chevrolet	155	0	500	$98,400
6	7	38	Elliott Sadler	Ford	150	0	500	$120,808
7	26	29	Kevin Harvick	Chevrolet	146	0	500	$115,011
8	24	25	Brian Vickers	Chevrolet	142	0	500	$85,350
9	2	26	Jamie McMurray	Ford	143	5	500	$122,675
10	11	10	Scott Riggs	Dodge	134	0	500	$76,700
11	9	2	Kurt Busch	Dodge	130	0	500	$111,683
12	25	41	Reed Sorenson*	Dodge	127	0	500	$85,925
13	30	6	Mark Martin	Ford	124	0	500	$90,575
14	6	14	Sterling Marlin	Chevrolet	126	5	500	$92,083
15	28	88	Dale Jarrett	Ford	123	5	500	$106,825
16	15	99	Carl Edwards	Ford	115	0	500	$89,100
17	14	22	Dave Blaney	Dodge	112	0	499	$89,233
18	4	12	Ryan Newman	Dodge	109	0	498	$114,358
19	21	1	Martin Truex Jr.*	Chevrolet	106	0	498	$94,208
20	18	18	J. J. Yeley*	Chevrolet	108	5	497	$109,125
21	12	96	Tony Raines	Chevrolet	100	0	497	$67,850
22	42	07	Clint Bowyer*	Chevrolet	97	0	496	$84,250
23	22	01	Joe Nemechek	Chevrolet	94	0	495	$98,245
24	16	17	Matt Kenseth	Ford	91	0	493	$113,491
25	34	66	Jeff Green	Chevrolet	88	0	491	$90,483
26	23	19	Jeremy Mayfield	Dodge	85	0	462	$100,066
27	32	42	Casey Mears	Dodge	82	0	456	$103,918
28	36	4	Scott Wimmer	Chevrolet	79	0	451	$69,460
29	33	55	Michael Waltrip	Dodge	76	0	445	$78,722
30	37	45	Kyle Petty	Dodge	73	0	439	$77,550
31	10	16	Greg Biffle	Ford	70	0	436	$86,100
32	13	43	Bobby Labonte	Dodge	67	0	429	$105,211
33	20	31	Jeff Burton	Chevrolet	64	0	426	$92,845
34	40	32	Travis Kvapil	Chevrolet	61	0	403	$65,425
35	5	9	Kasey Kahne	Dodge	58	0	374	$102,889
36	31	34	Chad Chaffin	Chevrolet	55	0	345	$65,325
37	41	11	Denny Hamlin*	Chevrolet	52	0	307	$65,250
38	38	40	David Stremme*	Dodge	49	0	299	$73,200
39	35	95	Stanton Barrett	Chevrolet	46	0	280	$65,140
40	19	21	Ken Schrader	Ford	43	0	164	$92,279
41	39	51	Mike Garvey	Chevrolet	PE	0	93	$65,015
42	43	92	Chad Blount	Dodge	37	0	92	$64,960
43	27	7	Robby Gordon	Chevrolet	34	0	7	$64,384

Failed to qualify: Derrike Cope (#74), Kevin Lepage (#61), Kenny Wallace (#78), Jimmy Spencer (#49), Morgan Shepherd (#89), Hermie Sadler

Previous race: 2006 Food City 500	Nextel Cup Series; 2006 season	Next race: 2006 Samsung/Radio Shack 500
