= 2006 UAW-Ford 500 =

Stock car race

Race details
- Race 30 of 36 in the 2006 NASCAR Nextel Cup Series
- The 2006 UAW-Ford 500 program cover, featuring Dale Jarrett, winner of the 2005 race.
- Date: October 8, 2006
- Official name: UAW-Ford 500
- Location: Talladega Superspeedway, Talladega, Alabama, US
- Course: Permanent racing facility
- Course length: 2.66 miles (4.28 km)
- Distance: 188 laps, 500.08 mi (804.8 km)
- Weather: Temperatures up to 75.2 °F (24.0 °C); wind speeds up to 8.9 miles per hour (14.3 km/h)
- Average speed: 157.602 miles per hour (253.636 km/h)

Pole position
Driver	David Gilliland	Robert Yates Racing
- Time: 49.950

Most laps led
Driver	Dale Earnhardt Jr.	Dale Earnhardt, Inc.
- Laps: 37

Winner
No. 25	Brian Vickers	Hendrick Motorsports

Television in the United States
- Network: NBC
- Announcers: Bill Weber, Benny Parsons, Wally Dallenbach Jr.
- Nielsen ratings: 4.8/10 (Final); 4.3/9 (Overnight)

Radio in the United States
- Radio: Motor Racing Network
- Booth announcers: Joe Moore, Barney Hall
- Turn announcers: Mike Bagley, Dan Hubbard, Dave Moody, Jeff Striegle

The 2006 UAW-Ford 500 was a stock car race that took place on October 8, 2006. The 38th annual running of the event, it was held at Talladega Superspeedway in Talladega, Alabama, United States, before 160,000 spectators. The 188-lap race was the 30th in the 2006 NASCAR Nextel Cup Series and the fourth in the ten-race, season-ending Chase for the Nextel Cup. Brian Vickers of Hendrick Motorsports won the race, his first career Cup series victory; Kasey Kahne finished second, and Kurt Busch came in third.

David Gilliland, who had the pole position, was passed immediately by teammate Dale Jarrett. The race lead changed 63 times, with Dale Earnhardt Jr. leading for the most laps (37). Earnhardt was leading on the final lap when he and Jimmie Johnson crashed after Vickers made contact with Johnson's right rear quarter panel, causing the race to end under caution flag conditions. Vickers (Johnson's teammate) was determined the race winner by NASCAR and was later criticized since the crash lowered Johnson in the points standings.

The logo for the UAW-Ford 500

The victory was the first in Vickers' career. After the race, Jeff Burton maintained his Drivers' Championship points lead, although that lead decreased significantly because he had a flat tire during the final laps of the race. Chevrolet maintained its lead in the Manufacturers' Championship, 51 points ahead of Dodge and 52 ahead of Ford with six races remaining in the season.

== Report ==
=== Background ===
Talladega Superspeedway is one of six superspeedways which host NASCAR races. The standard track is a four-turn, 2.66-mile (4.28 km) superspeedway. Its turns are banked 33 degrees, and its front stretch (the location of the finish line) is banked at 16.5 degrees. The back stretch additionally has a two-degree bank.

Talladega Superspeedway, where the race was held

Before the race Jeff Burton led the Drivers' Championship with 5,511 points, with Denny Hamlin second and Mark Martin third. Matt Kenseth and Kevin Harvick rounded out the top five and Jeff Gordon, Dale Earnhardt Jr., Jimmie Johnson, Kyle Busch and Kasey Kahne rounded out the top ten drivers competing in the 2006 Chase for the Nextel Cup. In the Manufacturers' Championship, Chevrolet led with 222 points; Ford was second with 175, and Dodge was a close third with 174 points. Dale Jarrett was the race's defending champion.

After the previous race at Talladega (the 2006 Aaron's 499), the track's condition was beginning to deteriorate. Cracks in the third and fourth turns were beginning to cause handling problems with the cars, and a temporary storage unit was built outside the track to accommodate the asphalt needed for resurfacing the track. The entire track, including the skid pad and pit road, was resurfaced, with the work completed shortly before the 2006 UAW-Ford 500 began.

=== Practice and qualification ===
Two 60-minute practice sessions were held the Friday before Sunday's race. In the first session Jeff Gordon was the fastest, ahead of Jarrett in second and Robby Gordon in third. David Gilliland placed fourth and Dave Blaney followed in fifth, with Casey Mears, J. J. Yeley, David Stremme, Brian Vickers and Kurt Busch rounding out the top ten. Later that day, Robby Gordon paced the second session, with Bobby Labonte, Hamlin, and Tony Stewart in second, third, and fourth place respectively. Blaney duplicated his first-session result in fifth, followed by Yeley, Harvick, Scott Riggs, Ryan Newman and Tony Raines.

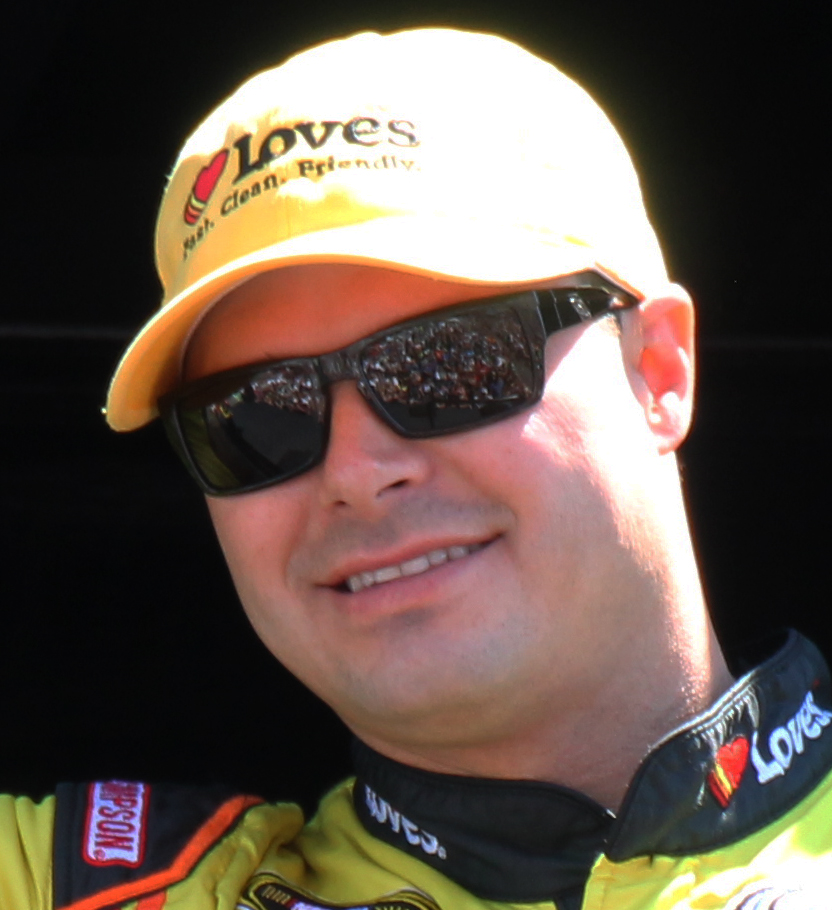
David Gilliland of Robert Yates Racing (pictured in 2015) qualified for the pole position with a time of 49.950 seconds.

Forty-nine cars were entered in the qualifier, although due to NASCAR's qualifying procedure only forty-three could race. Gilliland clinched his first career pole position with a time of 49.950 seconds and was joined on the grid's front row by Jarrett, his Robert Yates Racing teammate. Johnson, Jeff Gordon and Greg Biffle rounded out the top five positions, with Travis Kvapil, Chad Chaffin, Todd Bodine, Hermie Sadler, Kirk Shelmerdine and Kevin Lepage failing to qualify.

Early practice speeds approached 200 miles per hour (320 km/h). NASCAR had mandated before the qualifier that the holes in the cars' restrictor plates be reduced by 1/64 inch (0.4 mm), later conceding that the rule may have affected some teams more than others. According to Gilliland, "They threw a curveball at us this morning with the restrictor plate and (engine builder) Doug Yates wasn't worried at all. He put the super-tune on it and the thing ran great." Earnhardt called the reduction in speed unnecessary: "The track is safe ... I don't feel (the late change in plate size) is a very fair situation for everybody. Once you're up around the 190s, what's two miles an hour? I don't see what the big deal is. The speed average is up because the corner speed remains better with the new asphalt. As far as running in a straight line, we're no faster than we've always run here." Despite the mandated change, NASCAR did not schedule an additional practice session.

=== Race ===
Live television coverage of the race, the 30th of 36 in the 2006 NASCAR season, began in the United States at 1:00 p.m. Eastern Daylight Time on NBC. Rev. Mike Jackson gave the invocation at 2:20, followed by the 151st Army Band's rendition of the national anthem. The command for the drivers to start their engines was given by Gary Casteel of the UAW, and no driver had to move to the rear of the grid at the start.

The race began at 2:41 p.m. Jarrett passed Gilliland almost immediately to lead the first lap, but lost the lead to Jeff Gordon a lap later. Jamie McMurray passed Gordon for the lead on lap 4; by this time, Gilliland had fallen back to 30th after losing the draft. Three laps later, Gordon regained the lead from McMurray, with drafting assistance from Vickers. On lap 18, McMurray reclaimed the lead from Gordon, and they exchanged the lead again two laps later. On lap 24, McMurray reclaimed the lead, and Kenny Wallace made a pit stop with his car smoking.

On lap 28, Biffle took the lead from McMurray and Earnhardt moved into the top five. Green-flag pit stops were made from laps 30 to 33, with Biffle maintaining his lead. On lap 35, he was passed by Stewart, who lost the lead to Carl Edwards and Kyle Busch two laps later. On the 38th lap, Earnhardt took the lead. Busch passed him on lap 41, with Earnhardt (in the outside lane) dropping back to seventh. On lap 46, Kenseth passed Kyle Busch for the lead, with Kurt Busch and Earnhardt passing Kenseth five laps later.

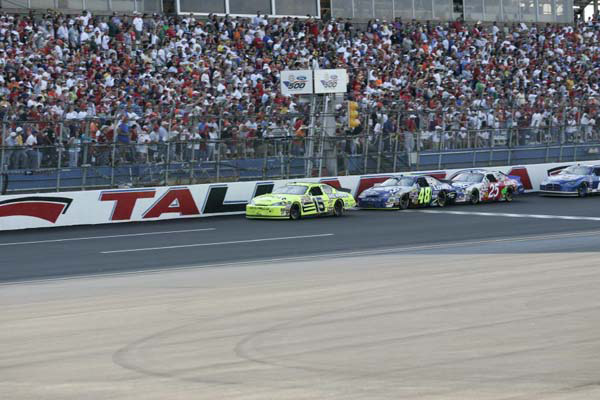
Paul Menard led the pack on lap 154.

Earnhardt reclaimed the lead on lap 52, losing it seven laps later to Elliott Sadler. Sadler refueled on the next lap, giving the lead back to Earnhardt. Kenseth took the lead on lap 61, as Earnhardt and others made green-flag pit stops. Kenseth stopped on lap 71 with Biffle and Edwards, with Biffle taking the lead as the pit-stop cycle ended. Lap 72 saw the first caution, as Blaney's left rear tire shredded and he made a pit stop. Biffle, Edwards, and Sterling Marlin stayed out, while the others stopped.

Biffle led the field back up to speed at the restart, and was passed on lap 77 by Jeff Gordon. Three laps later, Sadler made a pit stop with a flat right rear tire. On lap 90 Kyle Busch took the lead, losing it to Gordon on the next lap. McMurray passed Gordon on lap 93, holding the lead for nine laps. Vickers took the lead on lap 102; Earnhardt's left front tire went flat the next lap, costing him a lap. Green-flag pit stops began on lap 107, with Vickers stopping on lap 108 and giving the lead to McMurray. After the pit stops, Vickers regained the lead.

On lap 121, Kyle Busch took the lead, losing it to Jeff Gordon two laps later. Within a lap Gordon lost the draft and fell back to 27th, allowing Kenseth to regain the lead. On lap 127, Clint Bowyer passed Kenseth, holding the lead for two laps until a second yellow flag was displayed due to debris. Hamlin and Michael Waltrip staggered their pit stops, enabling each of them to lead a lap under the caution. Bowyer regained the lead after Waltrip stopped, and the race restarted on lap 134. Kenseth moved back into the lead on the next lap, with Bowyer falling back to tenth.

In a multi-car accident on the first turn on lap 137 Edwards and Mears collided, involving Biffle, Jeff Gordon, Hamlin, Harvick, Marlin, McMurray, Kyle Petty, and Martin Truex Jr. Gordon drove straight to the garage and others made pit stops, giving the lead to Burton. The race restarted on lap 145, during which many drivers topped up with fuel. Kenseth regained the lead; Vickers passed him on lap 147, with Johnson taking the lead a lap later. That lap Reed Sorenson's engine failed, ending his race.

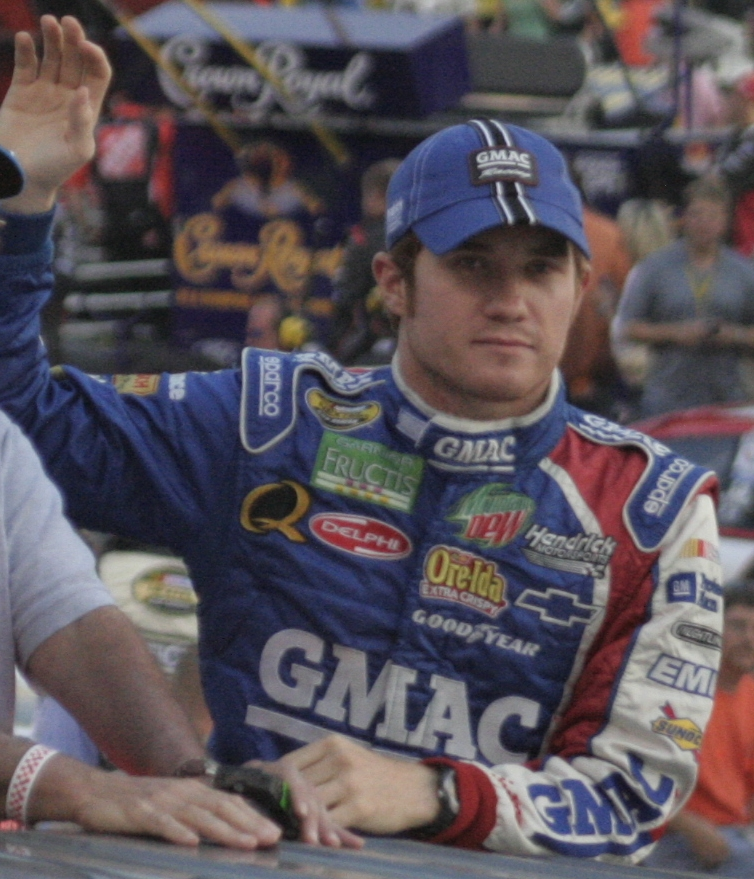
Brian Vickers (pictured in 2006) won the race after Dale Earnhardt Jr. and Jimmie Johnson, Vickers' teammate, crashed on the final lap.

Truex Jr. stayed out of pit road, and led the field to the restart on lap 152 before Johnson passed him a lap later. On lap 154 Paul Menard took the lead, with drafting assistance from Earnhardt, before Johnson regained the lead a lap later. Kahne took the lead on lap 158, losing it to Earnhardt on lap 165. A five-car accident on turn two of lap 173, involving Yeley, Menard, Stewart, Stremme, and Hamlin, prompted the fifth caution; none of the leaders made pit stops during this caution.

The race restarted on lap 178, with Earnhardt leading Johnson and Vickers. That lap, Burton (in fifth) had a flat left rear tire and lost a lap. The field then formed a single line, with most remaining in that formation for the rest of the race. On the final lap, Johnson and Vickers left turn two with Johnson moving out of line to pass Earnhardt. When Vickers tried to move out with Johnson to provide drafting assistance, he clipped Johnson's right rear quarter panel. Johnson then clipped Earnhardt Jr., sending both drivers sliding off the racetrack and into the infield. The yellow flag went out and the field was frozen in place, with the order of finish determined by where the drivers were when the caution began. This gave Vickers the race victory (the first of his career), although he was booed by the crowd.

=== Post-race comments ===
It is mixed emotions. It is neat to be in Victory Lane, but the last thing I wanted to do was get into Jimmie and wreck either of those guys.

— Vickers after the race

Vickers appeared in Victory Lane to celebrate his first career win in front of the crowd, earning $228,850 for the victory. Earnhardt was quick to forgive him for the last-lap accident: "He didn't wreck anyone on purpose. He was trying to push the 48. I don't think he thought, 'Oh, here's my chance to knock them both out.' He just got excited trying to push the 48." Johnson was less sanguine: "We had a great chance to make up some points and got crashed by a teammate ... I was real patient until the white flag was up. I got a good run inside the 8 and got a lot of help from behind—too much help ... Knowing the situation we're all in, I would hope someone would be a little more patient." Johnson's crew chief, Chad Knaus, was annoyed: "I just don't think [Vickers] has the talent to understand what he has underneath him."

Vickers, who would leave Hendrick Motorsports in 2007 for Red Bull Racing Team, said: "I would expect them to be a little upset. Jimmie is my friend, my teammate, and he is running for a championship. But he knows just as well as I do that if I wasn't bump-drafting, he never would have had a shot to pass Junior." Additionally, he denied that he drove more aggressively because he was leaving. Third-place finisher Kurt Busch argued Vickers was in a "Catch-22" situation: "He was trying to help his teammate. It just didn't turn out that way. Vickers was doing the best he could to help the 48. He just didn't anticipate the 8 car blocking as long as he did." Vickers would later receive additional security during the next race weekend.

The result kept Burton in the lead in the Drivers' Championship. After the race, Jeff Gordon (who was involved in the lap-137 accident) was less optimistic about his championship chances: "This pretty much does it for us as far as I'm concerned for the championship. You knew exactly that something like that was going to happen." In the Manufacturers' Championship Chevrolet increased its point total to 231; Dodge moved into second place with 180 and Ford was a close third with 179. The race took three hours, ten minutes and twenty-three seconds to complete; because it ended under caution, no margin of victory was recorded.

== Results ==
=== Qualifying ===
Qualifying results
Grid	No.	Driver	Team	Manufacturer	Time	Speed
1	38	David Gilliland	Robert Yates Racing	Ford	49.950	191.712
2	88	Dale Jarrett	Robert Yates Racing	Ford	50.001	191.516
3	48	Jimmie Johnson	Hendrick Motorsports	Chevrolet	50.294	190.400
4	24	Jeff Gordon	Hendrick Motorsports	Chevrolet	50.347	190.200
5	16	Greg Biffle	Roush Racing	Ford	50.389	190.042
6	5	Kyle Busch	Hendrick Motorsports	Chevrolet	50.451	189.808
7	14	Sterling Marlin	Ginn Racing	Chevrolet	50.527	189.522
8	26	Jamie McMurray	Roush Racing	Ford	50.610	189.212
9	25	Brian Vickers	Hendrick Motorsports	Chevrolet	50.678	188.958
10	18	J. J. Yeley	Joe Gibbs Racing	Chevrolet	50.686	188.928
11	12	Ryan Newman	Penske Racing South	Dodge	50.727	188.775
12	11	Denny Hamlin	Joe Gibbs Racing	Chevrolet	50.758	188.660
13	20	Tony Stewart	Joe Gibbs Racing	Chevrolet	50.781	188.574
14	29	Kevin Harvick	Richard Childress Racing	Chevrolet	50.786	188.556
15	01	Joe Nemechek	Ginn Racing	Chevrolet	50.826	188.408
16	1	Martin Truex Jr.	Dale Earnhardt, Inc.	Chevrolet	50.834	188.378
17	99	Carl Edwards	Roush Racing	Ford	50.870	188.245
18	45	Kyle Petty	Petty Enterprises	Dodge	50.886	188.185
19	17	Matt Kenseth	Roush Racing	Ford	50.892	188.163
20	49	Mike Bliss	BAM Racing	Dodge	50.901	188.130
21	55	Michael Waltrip	Waltrip-Jasper Racing	Dodge	50.925	188.041
22	19	Elliott Sadler	Evernham Motorsports	Dodge	50.932	188.015
23	21	Ken Schrader	Wood Brothers Racing	Ford	50.940	187.986
24	15	Paul Menard	Dale Earnhardt, Inc.	Chevrolet	50.943	187.975
25	9	Kasey Kahne	Evernham Motorsports	Dodge	50.946	187.964
26	78	Kenny Wallace	Furniture Row Racing	Chevrolet	50.951	187.945
27	04	Eric McClure	Morgan-McClure Motorsports	Chevrolet	50.956	187.927
28	09	Mike Wallace	Phoenix Racing	Ford	50.975	187.857
29	2	Kurt Busch	Penske Racing South	Dodge	50.983	187.827
30	6	Mark Martin	Roush Racing	Ford	50.996	187.779
31	42	Casey Mears	Chip Ganassi Racing	Dodge	51.002	187.757
32	07	Clint Bowyer	Richard Childress Racing	Chevrolet	51.077	187.482
33	8	Dale Earnhardt Jr.	Dale Earnhardt, Inc.	Chevrolet	51.080	187.471
34	31	Jeff Burton	Richard Childress Racing	Chevrolet	51.083	187.460
35	22	Dave Blaney	Bill Davis Racing	Dodge	51.099	187.401
36	7	Robby Gordon	Robby Gordon Motorsports	Chevrolet	51.108	187.368
37	66	Jeff Green	Haas CNC Racing	Chevrolet	51.129	187.291
38	40	David Stremme	Chip Ganassi Racing	Dodge	51.190	187.068
39	43	Bobby Labonte	Petty Enterprises	Chevrolet	51.258	186.820
40	96	Tony Raines	Hall of Fame Racing	Chevrolet	51.318	186.601
41	10	Scott Riggs	Evernham Motorsports	Dodge	51.463	186.075
42	41	Reed Sorenson	Chip Ganassi Racing	Dodge	51.556	185.740
43	74	Derrike Cope	McGlynn Racing	Dodge	51.105	187.379
Failed to qualify
44	32	Travis Kvapil	PPI Motorsports	Chevrolet	51.173	187.130
45	61	Chad Chaffin	Front Row Motorsports	Chevrolet	51.188	187.075
46	4	Todd Bodine	Morgan-McClure Motorsports	Chevrolet	51.244	186.871
47	00	Hermie Sadler	MBA Racing	Ford	51.329	186.561
48	27	Kirk Shelmerdine	Kirk Shelmerdine Racing	Chevrolet	51.545	185.779
49	34	Kevin Lepage	Front Row Motorsports	Dodge	51.649	185.405

=== Race results ===
Race results
Pos	Grid	No.	Driver	Team	Manufacturer	Laps	Points
1	9	25	Brian Vickers	Hendrick Motorsports	Chevrolet	188	185^{1}
2	25	9	Kasey Kahne	Evernham Motorsports	Dodge	188	175^{1}
3	29	2	Kurt Busch	Penske Racing South	Dodge	188	170^{1}
4	19	17	Matt Kenseth	Roush Racing	Ford	188	165^{1}
5	16	1	Martin Truex Jr.	Dale Earnhardt, Inc.	Chevrolet	188	160^{1}
6	14	29	Kevin Harvick	Richard Childress Racing	Chevrolet	188	150
7	37	66	Jeff Green	Hass CNC Racing	Chevrolet	188	146
8	30	6	Mark Martin	Roush Racing	Ford	188	147^{1}
9	17	99	Carl Edwards	Roush Racing	Ford	188	138
10	39	43	Bobby Labonte	Petty Enterprises	Dodge	188	134
11	6	5	Kyle Busch	Hendrick Motorsports	Chevrolet	188	135^{1}
12	2	88	Dale Jarrett	Robert Yates Racing	Ford	188	132^{1}
13	11	12	Ryan Newman	Penske Racing South	Dodge	188	124
14	21	55	Michael Waltrip	Waltrip-Jasper Motorsports	Dodge	188	126^{1}
15	1	38	David Gilliland	Robert Yates Racing	Ford	188	118
16	36	7	Robby Gordon	Robby Gordon Motorsports	Chevrolet	188	115
17	28	09	Mike Wallace	Phoenix Racing	Ford	188	112
18	15	01	Joe Nemechek	Ginn Racing	Chevrolet	188	114^{1}
19	41	10	Scott Riggs	Evernham Motorsports	Dodge	188	106
20	40	96	Tony Raines	Hall of Fame Racing	Chevrolet	188	103
21	12	11	Denny Hamlin	Joe Gibbs Racing	Chevrolet	188	105^{1}
22	13	20	Tony Stewart	Joe Gibbs Racing	Chevrolet	188	102^{1}
23	33	8	Dale Earnhardt Jr.	Dale Earnhardt, Inc.	Chevrolet	188	104^{2}
24	3	48	Jimmie Johnson	Hendrick Motorsports	Chevrolet	187	96^{1}
25	23	21	Ken Schrader	Wood Brothers Racing	Ford	187	88
26	20	49	Mike Bliss	BAM Racing	Dodge	187	85
27	34	31	Jeff Burton	Richard Childress Racing	Chevrolet	187	87^{1}
28	35	22	Dave Blaney	Bill Davis Racing	Dodge	186	79
29	22	19	Elliott Sadler	Evernham Motorsports	Dodge	186	81^{1}
30	31	42	Casey Mears	Chip Ganassi Racing	Dodge	185	78^{1}
31	27	04	Eric McClure	Morgan-McClure Motorsports	Chevrolet	182	70
32	10	18	J. J. Yeley	Joe Gibbs Racing	Chevrolet	177	67
33	38	40	David Stremme	Chip Ganassi Racing	Dodge	175	64
34	24	15	Paul Menard	Dale Earnhardt, Inc.	Chevrolet	173	66^{1}
35	32	07	Clint Bowyer	Richard Childress Racing	Chevrolet	171	63^{1}
36	4	24	Jeff Gordon	Hendrick Motorsports	Chevrolet	167	60^{1}
37	8	26	Jamie McMurray	Roush Racing	Ford	160	57^{1}
38	18	45	Kyle Petty	Petty Enterprises	Dodge	149	49
39	42	41	Reed Sorenson	Chip Ganassi Racing	Dodge	147	51^{1}
40	7	14	Sterling Marlin	Ginn Racing	Chevrolet	145	43
41	5	16	Greg Biffle	Roush Racing	Ford	137	45^{1}
42	26	78	Kenny Wallace	Furniture Row Racing	Chevrolet	24	37
43	43	74	Derrike Cope	McGlynn Racing	Dodge	9	34
^{1} Includes five bonus points for leading a lap
^{2} Includes ten bonus points for leading the most laps

== Standings after the race ==
Drivers' Championship standings
Rank	+/–	Driver	Points
1		Jeff Burton	5,598
2	2	Matt Kenseth	5,592 (−6)
3		Mark Martin	5,588 (−10)
4	1	Kevin Harvick	5,565 (−33)
5	3	Denny Hamlin	5,547 (−51)
6	1	Dale Earnhardt Jr.	5,492 (−106)
7	1	Jeff Gordon	5,451 (−147)
8		Jimmie Johnson	5,442 (−156)
9	1	Kasey Kahne	5,413 (−185)
10	1	Kyle Busch	5,413 (−185)

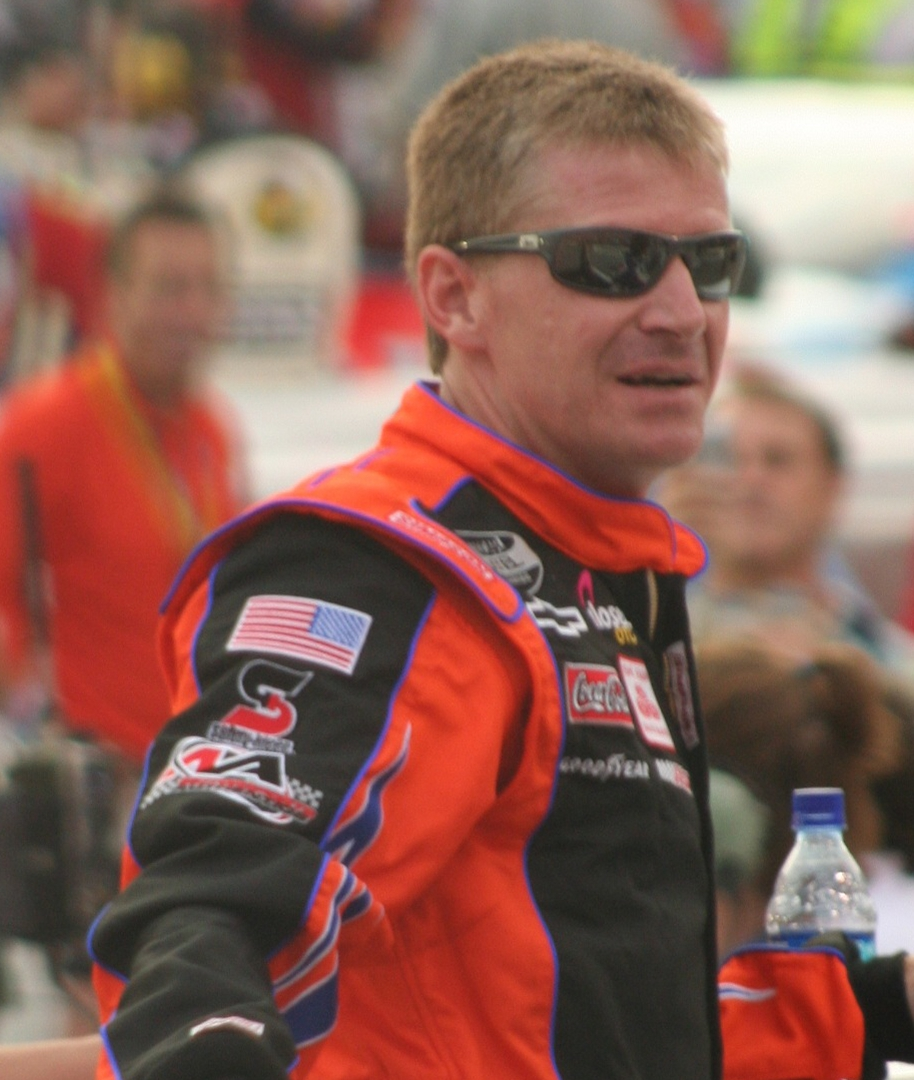
Despite finishing 27th, Jeff Burton remained the Drivers' Championship leader after the race with 5,598 points.

Manufacturers' Championship standings
Rank	+/–	Manufacturer	Points
1		Chevrolet	231
2	1	Dodge	180 (−51)
3	1	Ford	179 (−52)

- Note: Only the top ten positions are included for the driver standings. These drivers qualified for the Chase for the Nextel Cup.

Previous race: 2006 Banquet 400 Presented by ConAgra Foods	Nextel Cup Series; 2006 season	Next race: 2006 Bank of America 500
