= 2008 Camping World RV 400 =

Race details
- Race 28 of 36 in the 2008 NASCAR Sprint Cup Series season
- 2008 Camping World RV 400 program cover
- Date: September 21, 2008
- Official name: Camping World RV 400
- Location: Dover International Speedway, Dover, Delaware
- Course: Permanent racing facility
- Course length: 1.0 miles (1.609 km)
- Distance: 400 laps, 400 mi (643.737 km)
- Average speed: 114.168 miles per hour (183.736 km/h)

Pole position
Driver	Jeff Gordon	Hendrick Motorsports
- Time: 22.921

Most laps led
Driver	Matt Kenseth	Roush Fenway Racing
- Laps: 136

Winner
No. 16	Greg Biffle	Roush Fenway Racing

Television in the United States
- Network: ABC
- Announcers: Jerry Punch, Dale Jarrett and Andy Petree

The 2008 Camping World RV 400, was the twenty-eighth race of the 2008 NASCAR Sprint Cup season and the second race in the ten-race Chase for the Sprint Cup. The 400 miles (640 km) race was held on Sunday, September 21 at the 1 mile (1.6 km) Dover International Speedway in Dover, Delaware, the city that serves as state capital of the First State. ABC telecast the race beginning at 1 PM EDT and MRN along with Sirius Satellite Radio provided radio coverage starting at 1:15 PM US EDT.

== Pre-Race news ==
- Patrick Carpentier is officially a free agent after Gillett Evernham Motorsports could not find sponsorship for 2009. It will be more than likely that Reed Sorenson, who was signed away from Chip Ganassi Racing will take over the #10 car next season. In other GEM news, it was announced that Robby Gordon Motorsports will merge with the Gillett Evernham Motorsports organization for the 2009 season, this two weeks after GEM sued Robby Gordon's team in a dispute over the terms. Obviously, the suit will be dropped with the merger.
- NASCAR officially introduced a new random drug testing policy among all drivers, over-the-wall crew members and even race officials, effective with the 2009 season. This new policy will put the stock car racing organization on the same level as the major "ball-and-stick" sports.

== Qualifying ==
Jeff Gordon took the pole, with Mark Martin starting alongside.

RANK	DRIVER	NBR	CAR	TIME	SPEED	
1	Jeff Gordon	24	Chevrolet	22.921	157.061	
2	Mark Martin	8	Chevrolet	22.922	157.054	
3	Denny Hamlin	11	Toyota	23.001	156.515	
4	Kurt Busch	2	Dodge	23.021	156.379	
5	Greg Biffle	16	Ford	23.035	156.284	
6	Clint Bowyer	07	Chevrolet	23.125	155.676	
7	David Gilliland	38	Ford	23.134	155.615	
8	Matt Kenseth	17	Ford	23.145	155.541	
9	Jamie McMurray	26	Ford	23.149	155.514	
10	Dale Earnhardt, Jr.	88	Chevrolet	23.151	155.501	
11	Kyle Busch	18	Toyota	23.151	155.501	
12	Elliott Sadler	19	Dodge	23.161	155.434	
13	Tony Raines	70	Chevrolet	23.192	155.226	*
14	David Reutimann	44	Toyota	23.199	155.179	
15	Travis Kvapil	28	Ford	23.201	155.166	
16	Martin Truex, Jr.	1	Chevrolet	23.206	155.132	
17	Patrick Carpentier	10	Dodge	23.211	155.099	*
18	Brian Vickers	83	Toyota	23.212	155.092	
19	Ryan Newman	12	Dodge	23.219	155.045	
20	Jimmie Johnson	48	Chevrolet	23.227	154.992	
21	Jeff Burton	31	Chevrolet	23.232	154.959	
22	Carl Edwards	99	Ford	23.239	154.912	
23	David Ragan	6	Ford	23.241	154.899	
24	Kevin Harvick	29	Chevrolet	23.242	154.892	
25	Sam Hornish, Jr.	77	Dodge	23.261	154.765	*
26	Regan Smith	01	Chevrolet	23.265	154.739	
27	Joe Nemechek	78	Chevrolet	23.279	154.646	*
28	Michael McDowell	00	Toyota	23.312	154.427	
29	Marcos Ambrose	21	Ford	23.314	154.414	*
30	A.J. Allmendinger	84	Toyota	23.315	154.407	*
31	Casey Mears	5	Chevrolet	23.326	154.334	
32	Scott Riggs	66	Chevrolet	23.403	153.826	
33	Tony Stewart	20	Toyota	23.410	153.780	
34	Paul Menard	15	Chevrolet	23.421	153.708	
35	Juan Pablo Montoya	42	Dodge	23.451	153.512	
36	Kasey Kahne	9	Dodge	23.454	153.492	
37	Dave Blaney	22	Toyota	23.485	153.289	
38	Kyle Petty	45	Dodge	23.497	153.211	*
39	Ken Schrader	96	Toyota	23.518	153.074	*
40	Reed Sorenson	41	Dodge	23.525	153.029	
41	Michael Waltrip	55	Toyota	23.577	152.691	
42	Robby Gordon	7	Dodge	23.706	151.860	
43	Chad Chaffin	34	Chevrolet	23.711	151.828	*
44	Bobby Labonte	43	Dodge	23.834	151.045	OP
45	Johnny Sauter	08	Dodge	24.683	145.849	*
46	Stanton Barrett	50	Chevrolet			*

OP: qualified via owners points

PC: qualified as past champion

PR: provisional

QR: via qualifying race

* - had to qualify on time

Failed to qualify: Chad Chaffin (#34), Johnny Sauter (#08), Stanton Barrett (#50).

== Race Recap ==
Hard times continued for the top seed in the Chase, Kyle Busch, finished dead last and fell from eighth to 12th in the Chase. Roush Fenway Racing swept the top three spots as Greg Biffle, who had been winless entering the Chase, won his second straight race, winning last week in New Hampshire. Teammates Matt Kenseth and Carl Edwards followed Biffle.

== Results ==
POS	ST	#	DRIVER	CAR	LAPS	MONEY	STATUS	LED	PTS
1	5	16	Greg Biffle	Ford	400	218450	running	29	190
2	8	17	Matt Kenseth	Ford	400	208041	running	136	180
3	22	99	Carl Edwards	Ford	400	175150	running	85	170
4	2	8	Mark Martin	Chevrolet	400	154508	running	0	160
5	20	48	Jimmie Johnson	Chevrolet	400	162711	running	81	160
6	24	29	Kevin Harvick	Chevrolet	400	139461	running	1	155
7	1	24	Jeff Gordon	Chevrolet	400	146011	running	30	151
8	6	07	Clint Bowyer	Chevrolet	400	100625	running	2	147
9	21	31	Jeff Burton	Chevrolet	400	125183	running	0	138
10	40	55	Michael Waltrip	Toyota	400	118783	running	1	139
11	33	20	Tony Stewart	Toyota	400	125711	running	0	130
12	37	22	Dave Blaney	Toyota	400	95433	running	0	127
13	19	12	Ryan Newman	Dodge	400	116100	running	0	124
14	42	43	Bobby Labonte	Dodge	400	113461	running	0	121
15	31	5	Casey Mears	Chevrolet	400	91275	running	0	118
16	30	84	A.J. Allmendinger	Toyota	400	75025	running	0	115
17	14	44	David Reutimann	Toyota	399	74725	running	0	112
18	23	6	David Ragan	Ford	399	82750	running	0	109
19	7	38	David Gilliland	Ford	399	88483	running	0	106
20	16	1	Martin Truex, Jr.	Chevrolet	399	105308	running	0	103
21	34	15	Paul Menard	Chevrolet	398	81500	running	0	100
22	41	7	Robby Gordon	Dodge	398	94758	running	0	97
23	15	28	Travis Kvapil	Ford	397	101164	running	0	94
24	10	88	Dale Earnhardt, Jr.	Chevrolet	397	80750	running	0	91
25	32	66	Scott Riggs	Chevrolet	397	82522	running	0	88
26	36	9	Kasey Kahne	Dodge	397	102216	running	0	85
27	12	19	Elliott Sadler	Dodge	397	98320	running	0	82
28	13	70	Tony Raines	Chevrolet	396	68825	running	0	79
29	28	00	Michael McDowell	Toyota	395	73175	running	0	76
30	39	41	Reed Sorenson	Dodge	395	98739	running	0	73
31	18	83	Brian Vickers	Toyota	395	76350	running	0	70
32	29	21	Marcos Ambrose	Ford	395	86495	running	0	67
33	43	96	Ken Schrader	Toyota	394	76950	running	0	64
34	4	2	Kurt Busch	Dodge	394	67825	running	0	61
35	27	78	Joe Nemechek	Chevrolet	388	67600	running	0	58
36	9	26	Jamie McMurray	Ford	369	75450	running	35	60
37	26	01	Regan Smith	Chevrolet	365	75325	running	0	52
38	3	11	Denny Hamlin	Toyota	362	102266	running	0	49
39	35	42	Juan Pablo Montoya	Dodge	351	94933	crash	0	46
40	38	45	Kyle Petty	Dodge	349	66875	running	0	43
41	17	10	Patrick Carpentier	Dodge	348	66680	running	0	40
42	25	77	Sam Hornish, Jr.	Dodge	304	112130	crash	0	37
43	11	18	Kyle Busch	Toyota	172	84782	engine	0	34

Previous race: 2008 Sylvania 300	Sprint Cup Series; 2008 season	Next race: 2008 Camping World RV 400 presented by Coleman
