= 2006 Brickyard 400 =

NASCAR race held at Indianapolis in 2006

2006 Allstate 400 at the Brickyard
Race details
- Race 21 of 36 in the 2006 NASCAR Nextel Cup Series
- 2006 Brickyard 400 program cover
- Date: August 6, 2006
- Official name: Allstate 400 at the Brickyard
- Location: Indianapolis Motor Speedway, Speedway, Indiana
- Course: Permanent racing facility
- Course length: 2.5 miles (4.023 km)
- Distance: 160 laps, 400 mi (643.737 km)
- Weather: Hot with temperatures approaching 89.6 °F (32.0 °C); wind speeds up to 10.2 miles per hour (16.4 km/h)
- Average speed: 137.182 miles per hour (220.773 km/h)
- Attendance: 280,000

Pole position
Driver	Jeff Burton	Richard Childress Racing
- Time: 49.240

Most laps led
Driver	Jeff Burton	Richard Childress Racing
- Laps: 87

Winner
No. 48	Jimmie Johnson	Hendrick Motorsports

Television in the United States
- Network: NBC
- Announcers: Bill Weber, Wally Dallenbach Jr., Benny Parsons
- Nielsen ratings: 5.5/13 (Final); 4.8/11 (Overnight)

The 2006 Allstate 400 at the Brickyard was the 21st stock car race of the 2006 NASCAR Nextel Cup Series. The 13th running of the event, it was held on August 6, 2006, at Indianapolis Motor Speedway in Speedway, Indiana before a crowd of 280,000 spectators. Jimmie Johnson of Hendrick Motorsports won the 160-lap race starting from the fourth position. Roush Racing driver Matt Kenseth finished second and Richard Childress Racing's Kevin Harvick was third.

Jeff Burton won the pole position by posting the fastest lap in qualifying, and held his start line advantage for the next seven laps until Kasey Kahne passed him. Burton retook the lead from Kahne on the next lap, and led the most laps out of any one else (87) as the lead of the race changed eighteen times by nine different drivers. After falling to 39th because of a flat left-front tire on the 39th lap, Johnson recovered lost ground by maneuvering his way through traffic. He became the new leader on lap 117 after overtaking Harvick. Johnson led for a total of 38 laps en route to his fourth victory of the season, his first at Indianapolis Motor Speedway, and the 22nd of his career.

After the race Johnson's lead in the Drivers' Championship over Kenseth grew to 107 points. Although Burton finished down the order after slowing midway through the race, he kept the third position. Kyle Busch and Harvick were still in fourth and fifth, and Mark Martin likewise retained sixth the position. Chevrolet maintained its lead in the Manufacturers' Championship, 38 points ahead of Dodge, and 40 in front of Ford with fifteen races remaining in the season.

== Background ==
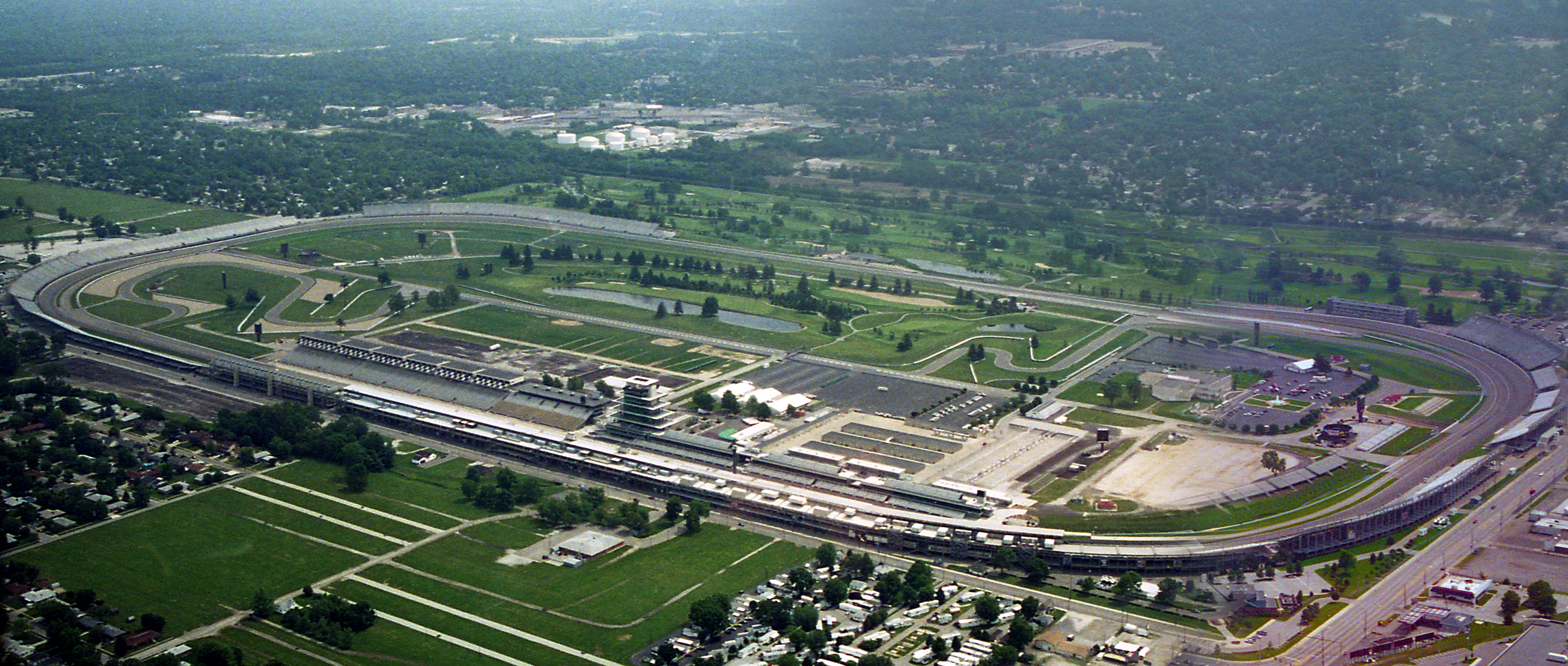
Indianapolis Motor Speedway, where the race was held.

The Allstate 400 at the Brickyard was the 21st out of 36 scheduled stock car races of the 2006 NASCAR Nextel Cup Series. It was held on August 6, 2006, at Indianapolis Motor Speedway in Speedway, Indiana, a superspeedway that holds NASCAR races. Indianapolis Motor Speedway's standard layout is a 2.5-mile (4.0 km) four-turn rectangular-oval track. Its turns are banked at nine degrees, and neither the front stretch (the location of the finish line) nor the back stretch are banked.

Before the race Jimmie Johnson led the Drivers' Championship with 2,939 points, with Matt Kenseth in second and Jeff Burton third. Kyle Busch and Kevin Harvick were fourth and fifth. Mark Martin, Kasey Kahne, Denny Hamlin, Jeff Gordon and Tony Stewart rounded out the top ten with six races of the regular season remaining until the Chase for the Nextel Cup. Chevrolet led the Manufacturers' Championship with 150 points; Dodge was second with 117 points, with Ford a close third on 113. Stewart was the race's defending champion.

In preparation for the race, NASCAR held the fifth of its six test days for Nextel Cup entrants on July 10–12 at Indianapolis Motor Speedway. Sessions began at 9:00 a.m. EST, and concluded at 6:00 p.m. 58 cars, participated in the July 10 morning session, while 63 were entered for the afternoon session. Dale Earnhardt Jr. was quickest with a speed of 177.518 mph (285.688 km/h) and Robby Gordon had the highest speed of 177.204 mph (285.182 km/h) in the afternoon session. Sterling Marlin, David Stremme, Kenseth, Chad Chaffin and Greg Biffle all damaged their cars in collisions with the barriers lining the track. The second day of testing was cancelled because of rain. The start of the final day of testing was delayed because of further rain where 42 cars took part. Reed Sorenson recorded the fastest speed of all three days of 181.892 mph (292.727 km/h) in the day's sole testing session.

Robert Yates Racing development driver Stephen Leicht was entered for the race in his attempt to become the youngest person in history to qualify for a Nextel Cup Series race. His Busch Series race seat was taken by David Gilliland to enable full concentrate on the race for Leicht. After taking the pole position for the Pepsi 400 in July, and leading the race with two laps to go before placing fourth, No Fear Racing's Boris Said attempted to qualify for the round at Indianapolis Motor Speedway. Bobby Hamilton Jr. of Bobby Hamilton Racing confirmed through a press release that he would enter the Brickyard 400, and would also compete in the Craftsman Truck Series race at Indianapolis Raceway Park.

== Practice and qualifying ==
Four one-hour practice sessions were held before the Sunday race: two on both Friday and Saturday. The first practice session was held in hot and sunny weather. Ken Schrader was fastest with a time of 49.911 seconds; Robby Gordon was second and Clint Bowyer third. Hamlin was fourth-fastest, ahead of Casey Mears and Earnhardt. Stremme, Scott Wimmer, Harvick and Paul Menard rounded out the session's top ten drivers. Boris Said made contact with a right-hand side wall leaving turn four, but he escaped with minor damage to his car. Practice was stopped for seven minutes because of debris on the track. In the second practice session, which took place in hot and sunny conditions, Kurt Busch was quickest with a 49.440 seconds lap, followed by Kahne, Robby Gordon, Scott Riggs, Schrader, Bowyer, Johnson, Reed Sorenson, Burton, and Hamlin. Early in the session, Michael Waltrip hit the turn four wall, but sustained no major damage to his car. Sorenson lost control of his vehicle in turn one, causing him to spin 90 degrees backwards into the SAFER barrier forty minutes in. Sorenson's car was heavily damaged, and he was transported to the infield care center for a pre-cautionary check-up at the infield medical center and later released. Sorenson was uninjured, and he went into a back-up car.

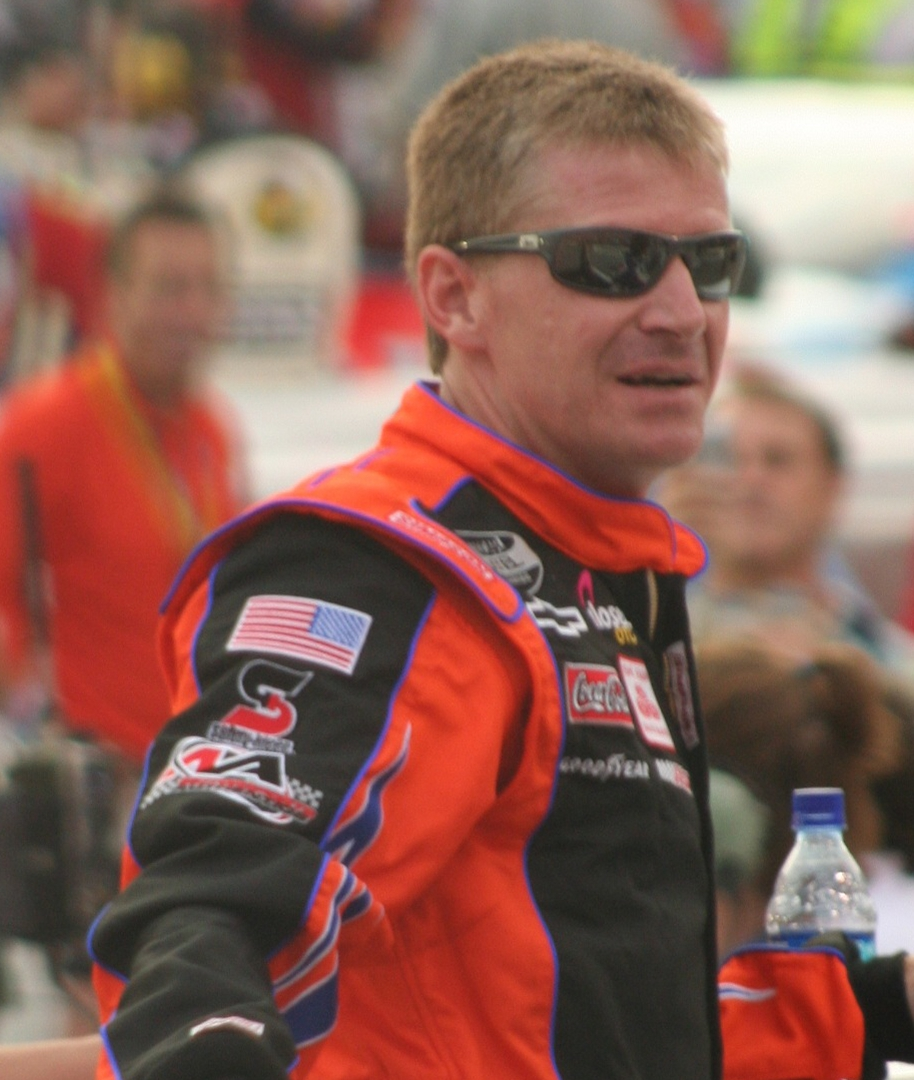
Jeff Burton (pictured in 2007) had the fifth pole position of his career.

There were 50 cars entered in the qualifier on Saturday morning, according to NASCAR's qualifying procedure, 43 were allowed to race. Each driver ran two laps, with the starting order determined by the competitor's fastest times. Qualifying took place in sunny conditions. A widely believed perception in the paddock was that the first cars to set lap times would have more of an advantage over those that drove later in qualifying as track temperatures rose. In what was considered a "surprise" result, Burton clinched his third pole position of the season, and the fifth of his career, with an early lap of 49.240 seconds. He was joined on the grid's front row by his Richard Childress Racing teammate Bowyer who was two-thousands of a second slower. Kurt Busch qualified third, Kahne took fourth, and Johnson started fifth. J. J. Yeley, Biffle, Ryan Newman, Robby Gordon and Harvick completed the top ten. The seven drivers who failed to qualify were Paul Menard, Waltrip, Johnny Sauter, Kevin Lepage, Leicht, Hamilton and Derrike Cope. After the qualifier Burton said, "I think I left a little bit out there. I ran as hard as I thought I could run and come back. I was a little bit conservative in a few places that if somebody has a little more confidence, they might be able to do better than that."

It continued to be sunny for the third practice session. Kahne paced the session with a time of 51.161 seconds. Bowyer was twenty-seven thousands of a second slower in second, and Harvick was third. Fourth through tenth was composed of Kurt Busch, Burton, Kenseth, Stremme, Jamie McMurray, Johnson, and Martin Truex Jr. Kurt Busch's left-front tire blew after deflating, and he collided with the turn one entry SAFER barrier with the right-hand side of his car. He switched to a back-up car for the remainder of the weekend. Bowyer had a similar issue with his car's left-front tire coming off turn four but he stopped in a safe location. Later that afternoon, in sunny conditions, Burton set the fastest lap in the final practice session at 51.370 seconds; Kenseth was second, and Carl Edwards third. Bowyer was fourth-fastest, Schrader placed fifth, and Brian Vickers sixth. Hamlin was seventh-quickest, Robby Gordon eighth, Martin ninth, and Harvick tenth.

=== Qualifying results ===
Grid	No.	Driver	Team	Manufacturer	Time	Speed
1	31	Jeff Burton	Richard Childress Racing	Chevrolet	49.240	182.778
2	07	Clint Bowyer	Richard Childress Racing	Chevrolet	49.242	182.771
3	2	Kurt Busch	Penske Racing South	Dodge	49.247	182.752^{1}
4	9	Kasey Kahne	Evernham Motorsports	Dodge	49.331	182.441
5	48	Jimmie Johnson	Hendrick Motorsports	Chevrolet	49.386	182.238
6	18	J. J. Yeley	Joe Gibbs Racing	Chevrolet	49.404	182.171
7	16	Greg Biffle	Roush Racing	Ford	49.433	182.065
8	12	Ryan Newman	Penske Racing South	Dodge	49.471	181.925
9	7	Robby Gordon	Robby Gordon Motorsports	Chevrolet	49.484	181.877
10	29	Kevin Harvick	Richard Childress Racing	Chevrolet	49.523	181.734
11	21	Ken Schrader	Wood Brothers Racing	Ford	49.576	181.540
12	10	Scott Riggs	Evernham Motorsports	Dodge	49.703	181.076
13	96	Tony Raines	Hall of Fame Racing	Chevrolet	49.714	181.036
14	11	Denny Hamlin	Joe Gibbs Racing	Chevrolet	49.741	180.937
15	19	Jeremy Mayfield	Evernham Motorsports	Dodge	49.859	180.509
16	24	Jeff Gordon	Hendrick Motorsports	Chevrolet	49.860	180.505
17	37	Mike Skinner	R&J Racing	Dodge	49.865	180.487
18	26	Jamie McMurray	Roush Racing	Ford	49.882	180.426
19	6	Mark Martin	Roush Racing	Ford	49.935	180.234
20	17	Matt Kenseth	Roush Racing	Ford	49.965	180.126
21	01	Joe Nemechek	Ginn Racing	Chevrolet	49.969	180.112
22	99	Carl Edwards	Roush Racing	Ford	49.982	180.065
23	1	Martin Truex Jr.	Dale Earnhardt Inc.	Chevrolet	49.982	180.065
24	40	David Stremme	Chip Ganassi Racing	Dodge	50.150	179.462
25	34	Chad Chaffin	Front Row Motorsports	Dodge	50.177	179.365^{1}
26	00	Bill Elliott	Michael Waltrip Racing	Chevrolet	50.207	179.258
27	38	Elliott Sadler	Robert Yates Racing	Ford	50.215	179.229
28	78	Kenny Wallace	Furniture Row Racing	Chevrolet	50.223	179.201
29	66	Jeff Green	Haas CNC Racing	Chevrolet	50.272	179.026
30	25	Brian Vickers	Hendrick Motorsports	Chevrolet	50.287	178.973
31	8	Dale Earnhardt Jr.	Dale Earnhardt Inc.	Chevrolet	50.301	178.923
32	20	Tony Stewart	Joe Gibbs Racing	Chevrolet	50.305	178.909
33	14	Sterling Marlin	MB2 Motorsports	Chevrolet	50.323	178.845
34	4	Scott Wimmer	Morgan–McClure Motorsports	Chevrolet	50.355	178.731
35	88	Dale Jarrett	Robert Yates Racing	Ford	50.368	178.685^{1}
36	32	Travis Kvapil	PPI Motorsports	Chevrolet	50.380	178.642
37	5	Kyle Busch	Hendrick Motorsports	Chevrolet	50.414	178.522
38	43	Bobby Labonte	Petty Enterprises	Dodge	50.435	178.447
39	42	Casey Mears	Chip Ganassi Racing	Dodge	50.463	178.348
40	45	Kyle Petty	Petty Enterprises	Dodge	50.555	178.024^{2}
41	41	Reed Sorenson	Chip Ganassi Racing	Dodge	50.765	177.288^{2}
42	22	Dave Blaney	Bill Davis Racing	Dodge	50.856	176.970^{2}
43	60	Boris Said	No Fear Racing	Ford	50.412	178.529
Failed to qualify
44	15	Paul Menard	Dale Earnhardt Inc.	Chevrolet	50.499	178.221
45	55	Michael Waltrip	Waltrip-Jasper Racing	Dodge	50.536	178.091
46	70	Johnny Sauter	Haas CNC Racing	Chevrolet	50.676	177.599
47	49	Kevin Lepage	BAM Racing	Dodge	50.818	177.103
48	90	Stephen Leicht	Robert Yates Racing	Ford	50.863	176.946
49	04	Bobby Hamilton Jr.	Bobby Hamilton Racing	Dodge	50.903	176.807
50	61	Derrike Cope	Front Row Motorsports	Chevrolet	51.563	174.537
^{1} Moved to the back of the grid for changing engines (#34, 88) and for going to a backup car (#2)^{2} Grid order set by owner points

== Race ==
Live television coverage of the race began at 1:30 p.m. in the United States on NBC. Around the start of the race, weather conditions were sunny with an ambient temperature of 88 °F (31 °C) and a track temperature of 135 °F (57 °C). Howard Brammer, reverend of Traders Point Christian Church in downtown Indianapolis, began pre-race ceremonies with an invocation. Kelly Rowland of the American girl group Destiny's Child performed the national anthem, and the chairwoman of the Indianapolis Motor Speedway Mari Hulman George commanded the drivers to start their engines. During the pace laps, Chaffin and Dale Jarrett went to the back of the grid for changing their engines, and Kurt Busch did the same after going into his back-up car. NASCAR scheduled a competition caution for laps 15 and 40 to enable teams to check the state of their tires after drivers raised concerns about their lifespan.

The race started at 2:54 p.m. Burton maintained the lead going into the first turn, and pulled way to hold a small but healthy gap by the end of the first lap. That same year Kahne overtook Bowyer for second. On the second lap, Bowyer lost third when Johnson overtook him. The first caution was given on lap three as Elliott Sadler lost control of his car in turn one, and heavily clouted a wall with the rear of his car. Joe Nemechek did minor damage to his car when he hit wall try to avoid Sadler. Under caution, Nemechek, Said and Sorenson elected to drive down pit road for repairs, but NASCAR forbade pit stops for fuel because of the first competition caution. Burton led at the lap seven restart, followed by Kahne and Johnson. However, Burton only led for the first two turns as Kahne passed him on the inside on the backstraightaway. Burton retook the first position from Kahne on the inside at turn four during the next lap. Jeff Gordon went to pit road on lap nine to repair a broken bolt on his left-front sway bar, but he did not get lapped by the leader until three laps after. Biffle was passed by Bowyer for fourth on the eleventh lap. After starting 32nd, Stewart moved into 15th by lap 15. The first competition caution was waved on the next lap. All drivers made pit stops for fuel, tires and track bar adjustments.

Burton retained the lead on the lap-20 restart. On the lap, the third caution came out for Said who was hit at the rear of his car by Sorenson, causing Said to collide with the SAFER barrier between turns three and four, and rested facing the opposite direction in the infield grass. The race restarted four laps later with Burton still in first. Kahne and Biffle moved past Johnson to claim the second and third positions on the same lap. Just as NASCAR was about to trigger the second competition caution, Johnson's front-left tire went flat on lap 39, and he was worried about potential damage to his front-left fender. Johnson continued to drive slower than the rest of the field until the discarded rubber that was left on the track necessitated the fourth caution. Every driver (including Burton) chose to make pit stops for fuel during the caution. Kenny Wallace staggered his stop, enabling him to lead the 41st lap. As Johnson exited his pit stall, a fire ignited due to him burning fuel that spilt onto the concrete surface but safety crews quickly extinguished the blaze. Burton became the leader once more, and retained it at the restart on lap 45. Kahne dropped to eighth over the next three laps, while Johnson gained eight positions to run 30th by the 50th lap despite a visible left-front tire rub on his car.

On lap 58, Jeremy Mayfield lost control of his car in turn two due to an handling issue, and drifted up into the SAFER barrier, damaging his car's right-hand side and triggering the fifth caution. During the caution, some drivers, including Burton, made pit stops for tires and car adjustments. Vickers elected to have only two new tires at his stop, and assumed the lead for the restart on lap 61. Burton passed Vickers to get back the lead on the following lap. Vickers then lost second place to Harvick, before dropping to fifth when Kenseth and Edwards moved past him. Over laps 70 and 73, Harvick and his teammate Burton exchanged the first position before the battle ended with Harvick successfully taking the lead. He subsequently pulled away from Burton. Edwards moved ahead of Burton for second on the 77th lap as he was seeking to get closer to Harvick. Eight laps later, Burton was demoted to fourth when Kenseth overtook him. A sixth caution was needed on lap 86 when debris was located in turn three's high groove. The entire field chose to make pit stops for tires and car adjustments under the caution. Edwards fell from second to eighth because his stop was problematic as his crew could not correctly fit a lug nut for his front-right tire. Harvick stayed in the lead at the lap 90 restart, and began to pull away from Kenseth.

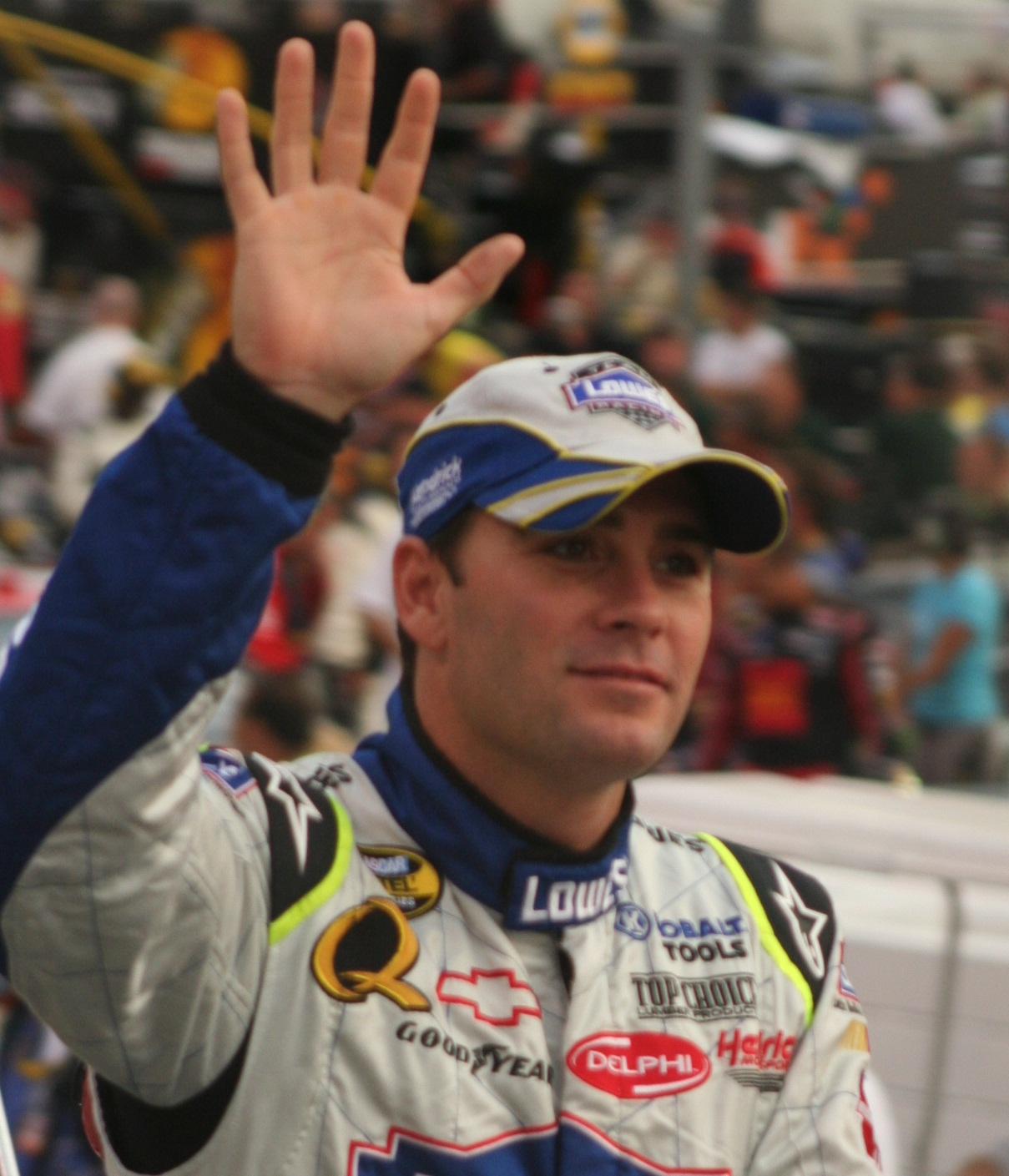
Jimmie Johnson (pictured in 2007) recovered from a flat front-right tire early in the race to claim his fourth victory of the season.

Kenseth drew alongside Harvick, and passed him to take the lead on lap 110. That lap, Johnson overtook Martin for fourth. By lap 115, Burton slowed and he fell to seventh. After falling to 39th, Johnson recovered several positions as he maneuvered his way through traffic. He moved past Harvick for second on the 116th lap. On the lap after, Johnson passed Kenseth on the backstretch for the lead. Johnson began to pull away from the remainder of the field. Green flag pit stops began on lap 123 when Biffle came onto pit road. Johnson stopped on the following lap, giving the first position to Kenseth. Kyle Busch and Nemechek each led one lap before making their own separate pit stops. After the pit stops, Johnson regained the lead. On lap 140, Johnson's lead of 1.826 seconds was reduced to nothing when the seventh caution was given for debris in turn three. Johnson and most of the field elected to make pit stops for tires and car adjustments under caution. Kyle Busch chose not to make a pit stop, and led the field at the lap 147 restart, with Earnhardt second and Newman third. Further down the field, three-abreast racing occurred, as drivers on worn tires tried to fend off the attacks from those on newer tires.

After emerging from the pit stops in eighth, Johnson returned to the top three by the 150th lap. The following lap, Earnhardt overtook Kyle Busch in turn two to become the new leader. Earnhardt held it until Johnson got by him in turn four. Kenseth moved past Earnhardt for second on lap 152 as the latter's old tires meant he lost further positions over the next four laps. As Johnson started the final lap, he led Kenseth by 2.13 seconds when the final caution was necessitated for two separate crashes that ended competitive racing. Riggs ran into the rear of Robby Gordon's vehicle who slid upwards into the side of Biffle's car; both drivers spun leaving turn two. While battling Stewart for eighth, Kahne oversteered and slowed, causing Edwards to tap Kahne and the latter spun 360 degrees and went into a wall at turn three heavily with the front of his car. Kahne was uninjured. Other drivers involved were Hamlin, and Tony Raines.

The field was frozen in place, with the order of finish determined by where the drivers were when the caution began. This gave Johnson his fourth victory of the season, his first at Indianapolis Motor Speedway, and the 22nd of his career. Johnson's achievement made him the second driver after Jarrett to win the Daytona 500 and the Brickyard 400 in the same year. Kenseth finished second, Harvick came third, Bowyer took fourth, and Martin placed fifth. Earnhardt, Kyle Busch, Stewart, Edwards, and Hamlin completed the top ten finishers. The race had a total of eight cautions and 18 lead changes by nine drivers. Burton led six times for a total of 86 laps, more than any other driver. Johnson led three times for 33 laps.

=== Post-race ===
Johnson appeared in Victory Lane after his victory lap to celebrate his fourth win of the season in front of the crowd; the win earned him $452,861. He said that he doubted his ability to win at Indianapolis Motor Speedway, "I've watched so many races here as a kid growing [up]. I thought I would come here in an Indy car. I drove in the off-road ranks and idolized Rick Mears, Roger Mears, Robby Gordon, and those guys all came out of off-road racing to Indy car. I hoped to win here in an Indy car. I can't believe I'm here in a stock car in NASCAR winning the biggest race." Johnson continued, "I knew we had a fast race car. We had to come through traffic, and that made it harder on the tires." Kenseth reserved praise for his crew chief Robbie Reiser but spoke of his disappoint after he could not win the race, "The 48 [Johnson] came out of nowhere and blew by us all and won the race. He just got through traffic better than us. He just did a better job of being in the right place getting through those cars." Third-placed Harvick said he could not challenge Johnson due to his fast pace, "He pretty much had us all covered.", and, "We had a good car, but we got a little bit behind on the last pitstop. We put on four tyres but didn't have enough time left."

Kahne was the most affected of all the drivers in the provisional Chase for the Nextel Cup standings after his last lap crash with Stewart. He said, "I was trying to get in a battle with all those guys for positions sixth, seventh and eighth. Trying to pass Stewart, I got loose. I was trying to stay off Tony and I guess I ran into the wall." After going airborne from driving over debris scattered on the track from Kahne's car, Raines said, "He got loose and overcorrected. Whatever fell out of his car was the size of a beer cooler. I was surprised the car even drove back. I think the bottom was all torn up." Nevertheless, Stewart spoke of his happiness over coming eighth despite losing positions because of a mistake by his pit crew, "I think I passed 60 cars or more today. We got ourselves into the top 10 early in the race, and just had an airgun break on a pit stop ... we came in and made sure the lug nuts were tight, went to the back, and then battled our way back into the top 10, so I'm pretty happy." Earnhardt said that while he could not take the victory, he was attempting to maintain his position to the best of his ability, "I'd love having a better car and not having to make that call (to stay out). We can't make the Chase with 30-place race cars. We took a chance and made it work and just got lucky."

The result kept Johnson in the lead of the Drivers' Championship with an increased margin of 107 points over Kenseth. Burton maintained the third position, while Harvick's third-place finish allowed him to tie with Kyle Busch on points for fourth. Martin stayed in sixth and Hamlin advanced to seventh. Rounding out the top ten were Jeff Gordon, Stewart and Earnhardt. Johnson said about his elongated lead, "It's way too early to say we've broken the pattern, but this is a great start." In the Manufacturers' Championship, Chevrolet maintained its lead with 159 points. Dodge remained in second with 121 points with Ford another two points behind in third. The race took two hours, 54 minutes and 57 seconds to complete; because it ended under caution, no margin of victory was recorded.

=== Race results ===
Pos.	No.	Driver	Team	Manufacturer	Laps	Points
1	48	Jimmie Johnson	Hendrick Motorsports	Chevrolet	160	185^{1}
2	17	Matt Kenseth	Roush Racing	Ford	160	175^{1}
3	29	Kevin Harvick	Richard Childress Racing	Chevrolet	160	170^{1}
4	07	Clint Bowyer	Richard Childress Racing	Chevrolet	160	160
5	6	Mark Martin	Roush Racing	Ford	160	155
6	8	Dale Earnhardt Jr.	Dale Earnhardt Inc.	Chevrolet	160	150
7	5	Kyle Busch	Hendrick Motorsports	Chevrolet	160	151^{1}
8	20	Tony Stewart	Joe Gibbs Racing	Chevrolet	160	142
9	99	Carl Edwards	Roush Racing	Ford	160	138
10	11	Denny Hamlin	Joe Gibbs Racing	Chevrolet	160	134
11	96	Tony Raines	Hall of Fame Racing	Chevrolet	160	130
12	2	Kurt Busch	Penske Racing South	Dodge	160	127
13	12	Ryan Newman	Penske Racing South	Dodge	160	124
14	21	Ken Schrader	Wood Brothers Racing	Ford	160	121
15	31	Jeff Burton	Richard Childress Racing	Chevrolet	160	128^{2}
16	24	Jeff Gordon	Hendrick Motorsports	Chevrolet	160	115
17	25	Brian Vickers	Hendrick Motorsports	Chevrolet	160	117^{1}
18	40	David Stremme	Chip Ganassi Racing	Dodge	160	109
19	1	Martin Truex Jr.	Dale Earnhardt Inc.	Chevrolet	160	106
20	4	Scott Wimmer	Morgan-McClure Motorsports	Chevrolet	160	103
21	10	Scott Riggs	Evernham Mootrsports	Dodge	160	100
22	00	Bill Elliott	Michael Waltrip Racing	Chevrolet	160	97
23	42	Casey Mears	Chip Ganassi Racing	Dodge	160	94
24	01	Joe Nemechek	Ginn Racing	Chevrolet	160	96^{1}
25	32	Travis Kvapil	PPI Motorsports	Chevrolet	160	88
26	26	Jamie McMurray	Roush Racing	Ford	160	85
27	45	Kyle Petty	Petty Enterprises	Dodge	160	82
28	88	Dale Jarrett	Robert Yates Racing	Ford	160	79
29	22	Dave Blaney	Bill Davis Racing	Dodge	160	76
30	41	Reed Sorenson	Chip Ganassi Racing	Dodge	160	73
31	14	Sterling Marlin	MB2 Motorsports	Chevrolet	160	70
32	78	Kenny Wallace	Furniture Row Racing	Chevrolet	160	72^{1}
33	16	Greg Biffle	Roush Racing	Ford	160	64
34	18	J. J. Yeley	Joe Gibbs Racing	Chevrolet	160	61
35	7	Robby Gordon	Robby Gordon Motorsports	Chevrolet	160	58
36	9	Kasey Kahne	Evernham Motorsports	Dodge	159	60^{1}
37	37	Mike Skinner	R&J Racing	Dodge	159	52
38	66	Jeff Green	Haas CNC Racing	Chevrolet	159	49
39	34	Chad Chaffin	Front Row Motorsports	Dodge	159	46
40	43	Bobby Labonte	Petty Enterprises	Dodge	135	43
41	19	Jeremy Mayfield	Evernham Motorsports	Dodge	82	40
42	60	Boris Said	No Fear Racing	Ford	19	37
43	38	Elliott Sadler	Robert Yates Racing	Ford	3	34
^{1} Includes five bonus points for leading a lap^{2} Includes ten bonus points for leading the most laps

== Standings after the race ==
Drivers' Championship standings

Pos	+/–	Driver	Points
1		Jimmie Johnson	3,124
2		Matt Kenseth	3,017 (−107)
3		Jeff Burton	2,749 (−375)
4		Kyle Busch	2,733 (−391)
5		Kevin Harvick	2,733 (−391)
6		Mark Martin	2,712 (−412)
7	1	Denny Hamlin	2,648 (−476)
8	1	Jeff Gordon	2,627 (−497)
9	1	Tony Stewart	2,619 (−505)
10	1	Dale Earnhardt Jr.	2,612 (−512)

Manufacturers' Championship standings

Pos	+/–	Manufacturer	Points
1		Chevrolet	159
2		Dodge	121 (−38)
3		Ford	119 (−40)

- Note: Only the top ten positions are included for the driver standings.

Previous race: 2006 Pennsylvania 500	Nextel Cup Series; 2006 season	Next race: 2006 AMD at the Glen
