= 2006 Food City 500 =

Race details
- Race 5 of 36 in the 2006 NASCAR Nextel Cup Series season
- 2006 Food City 500 program cover, featuring Jeff Gordon and Dale Earnhardt Jr.
- Date: March 26, 2006
- Location: Bristol Motor Speedway in Bristol, Tennessee
- Course: Permanent racing facility
- Course length: 0.533 miles (0.858 km)
- Distance: 500 laps, 266.5 mi (428.89 km)
- Weather: Cold with temperatures approaching 41 °F (5 °C); wind speeds up to 8.9 miles per hour (14.3 km/h)
- Average speed: 79.427 miles per hour (127.825 km/h)

Pole position
Driver	Tony Stewart	Joe Gibbs Racing
- Time: Owner points

Most laps led
Driver	Tony Stewart	Joe Gibbs Racing
- Laps: 245

Winner
No. 2	Kurt Busch	Penske Racing

Television in the United States
- Network: Fox
- Announcers: Mike Joy, Darrell Waltrip, and Larry McReynolds

The 2006 Food City 500 was an event held at Bristol Motor Speedway on March 26, 2006, as the fifth race in the 2006 NASCAR Nextel Cup Series season. The race had eighteen cautions and was won by Kurt Busch, who scored his 15th career win and first for Roger Penske. This was Busch's fourth win in the event in six tries and fifth overall at the facility.

== Qualifying ==
Qualifying was canceled due to extreme weather conditions, so the field was set with the top 35 owners points from 2005, the Champion's Provisional (for Terry Labonte) and seven others, based on qualifying attempts in 2006. As a result, 2005 champion Tony Stewart sat on the pole.

1. Tony Stewart #20 Home Depot Chevrolet Joe Gibbs Racing
2. Greg Biffle #16 Subway/National Guard Ford Roush Racing
3. Carl Edwards #99 Office Depot Ford Roush Racing
4. Mark Martin#6 AAA Ford Roush Racing
5. Jimmie Johnson #48 Lowe's Chevrolet Hendrick Motorsports
6. Ryan Newman #12 Alltel Dodge Penske Racing
7. Matt Kenseth #17 USG Sheetrock/DeWalt Ford Roush Racing
8. Jamie McMurray #26 Sharpie Ford Roush Racing
9. Kurt Busch #2 Miller Lite Dodge Penske Racing
10. Jeremy Mayfield #19 Dodge Dealers/UAW Dodge Evernham Motorsports
11. Jeff Gordon #24 DuPont Chevrolet Hendrick Motorsports
12. Casey Mears #42 Texaco/Havoline Dodge Chip Ganassi Racing
13. Elliott Sadler #38 M&M's Ford Robert Yates Racing
14. Kevin Harvick #29 GM Goodwrench Chevrolet Richard Childress Racing
15. Dale Jarrett #88 UPS Ford Robert Yates Racing
16. Joe Nemechek #01 U.S. Army Chevrolet MB2 Motorsports
17. Brian Vickers #25 GMAC Chevrolet Hendrick Motorsports
18. Jeff Burton #31 Cingular Wireless Chevrolet Richard Childress Racing
19. Dale Earnhardt Jr. #8 Budweiser Chevrolet Dale Earnhardt Inc
20. Kyle Busch #5 Kellogg's Chevrolet Hendrick Motorsports
21. Ken Schrader #21 Little Debbie Ford Wood Brothers
22. Reed Sorensen* #41 Target Dodge Chip Ganassi Racing
23. Kasey Kahne #9 Dodge Dealers/UAW Dodge Evernham Motorsports
24. J. J. Yeley* #18 AsthmaControl.com Chevrolet Joe Gibbs Racing
25. Martin Truex Jr.* #1 Bass Pro Shops Chevrolet Dale Earnhardt Inc
26. David Stremme* #40 Lone Star Steakhouse Dodge Chip Ganassi Racing
27. Clint Bowyer* #07 Jack Daniels Chevrolet Richard Childress Racing
28. Kyle Petty #45 Schwans Dodge Petty Enterprises
29. Jeff Green #66 Best Buy Chevrolet Haas CNC Racing
30. Bobby Labonte #43 Cheerios Dodge Petty Enterprises
31. Brent Sherman* #49 Serta Dodge BAM Racing
32. Dave Blaney #22 Caterpillar Dodge Bill Davis Racing
33. Denny Hamlin* #11 FedEx Chevrolet Joe Gibbs Racing
34. Michael Waltrip #55 NAPA Dodge Waltrip-Jasper Racing
35. Sterling Marlin #14 Waste Management Chevrolet MB2 Motorsports
36. Terry Labonte*** #96 DLP HDTV Chevrolet Hall of Fame Racing
37. Robby Gordon** #7 Menards Chevrolet Robby Gordon Motorsports
38. Scott Riggs** #10 Valvoline Dodge Evernham Motorsports
39. Kevin Lepage** #61 RoadLoans.com Ford Peak Fitness Racing
40. Scott Wimmer** #4 Aero Exhaust Chevrolet Morgan McClure Motorsports
41. Travis Kvapil** #32 Tide Chevrolet PPI Motorsports
42. Hermie Sadler** #00 Aaron's Ford Michael Waltrip Racing
43. Stanton Barrett** #95 hairofdog.com Chevrolet Stanton Barrett Motorsports

Did not qualify

- DNQ. Kenny Wallace #78 Furniture Row Chevrolet Furniture Row Racing
- DNQ. Mike Garvey #51 Marathon Oil Chevrolet Competitive Edge Motorsports
- DNQ. Mike Skinner #37 Dodge R&J Racing
- DNQ. Derrike Cope #74 Royal Admin Dodge McGlynn Racing
- DNQ. Morgan Shepherd #89 Dutch Quality Stone Dodge Shepherd Racing Ventures
- DNQ. Chad Blount #92 Chevrolet Front Row Motorsports
- DNQ. Chad Chaffin* #34 Kingsport Iron Chevrolet Front Row Motorsports

* Denotes Raybestos Rookie of the Year candidate ** Denotes Owner Points required *** Denotes Past Champions Provisional Needed

== Race recap ==
Qualifying was cancelled on March 24 due to snow, sleet and rain, and the field was set with top 35 owners points from 2005, the Champion's Provisional (for Terry Labonte) and seven others, based on qualifying attempts in 2006. As a result, 2005 champion Tony Stewart sat on the pole.

The race featured 18 cautions, and over 100 of the 500 laps were run under the yellow flag. Points leader Jimmie Johnson made contact with the car of Reed Sorenson, which caused a flat tire and put the #48 car several laps down; this would lead to him finishing 30th. Lap 188 saw the most notable wreck of the first half of the race, where Clint Bowyer spun Dave Blaney, causing a chain reaction collecting David Stremme, Brian Vickers, and Michael Waltrip. This brought out a red flag to cleanup.

Jeff Gordon spun Martin Truex Jr. out on lap 415, collecting Jeff Burton, Robby Gordon, and J. J. Yeley. Kurt Busch, who had made up two laps lost earlier in the day due to tire problems, used the "bump-and-run" to nudge Matt Kenseth out of the lead with four laps to go. Gordon used the same tactic to take third but on the final lap, Kenseth used the bump and run to spin Gordon out as Busch raced to victory. Gordon finished 21st and was involved in a shoving match with Kenseth on pit road after the race, for which he was put on probation and fined $10,000 by NASCAR.

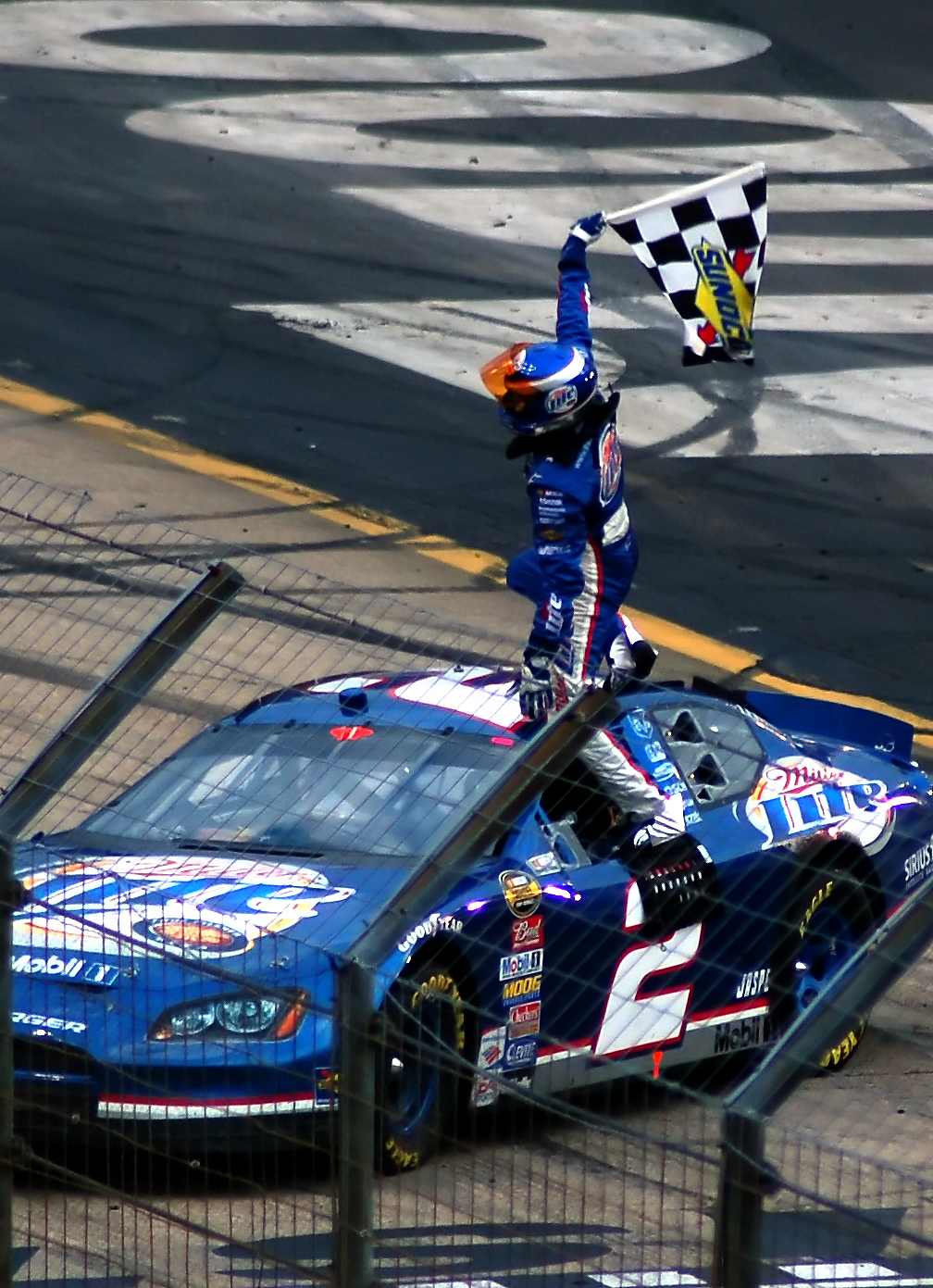
Kurt Busch celebrates after winning the 2006 Food City 500.

Besides the dyed between Gordon and Kenseth, there also was bitter rivalry shown between Busch and Kevin Harvick following contact last week at Atlanta. During the pre-race ceremonies and in the drivers meeting, Harvick spent his time taunting Busch for no good reason. Busch ignored his insults and dismissed reporters. Harvick had been complaining about Busch all week and once retorted that Roger Penske (Busch's team owner) would make a fool of himself in hiring Busch. NASCAR warned Busch and Harvick that if they got into a feud on the track, they would get penalized. Busch later won the race and Harvick ended up second. When interviewed, Kevin was not finished and said "I am glad for my second-place spot but seeing Kurt [Busch] up there is terrible. I hate to see him win. He is a big whiner."

The win was Busch's fifth in 11 career races at the track and the fifteenth in his career. It was Dodge's first win at Bristol since Richard Petty in 1975.

== Race results ==
Pos	Grid	Driver	No.	Make	Points	Bonus	Laps	Winnings
1	9	Kurt Busch	2	Dodge	185	5	500	$175,858
2	14	Kevin Harvick	29	Chevrolet	175	5	500	$160,886
3	7	Matt Kenseth	17	Ford	170	5	500	$166,566
4	3	Carl Edwards	99	Ford	160	0	500	$122,575
5	30	Bobby Labonte	43	Dodge	155		500	$138,836
6	4	Mark Martin	6	Ford	150		500	$105,825
7	2	Greg Biffle	16	Ford	151	5	500	$105,150
8	20	Kyle Busch	5	Chevrolet	147	5	500	$102,450
9	6	Ryan Newman	12	Dodge	138		500	$129,258
10	23	Kasey Kahne	9	Dodge	134		500	$125,864
11	19	Dale Earnhardt Jr.	8	Chevrolet	130		500	$124,516
12	1	Tony Stewart	20	Chevrolet	137	10	500	$168,886
13	13	Elliott Sadler	38	Ford	124		500	$115,733
14	33	Denny Hamlin *	11	Chevrolet	121		500	$88,000
15	29	Jeff Green	66	Chevrolet	118		500	$113,458
16	10	Jeremy Mayfield	19	Dodge	115		500	$115,866
17	35	Sterling Marlin	14	Chevrolet	112		500	$101,783
18	28	Kyle Petty	45	Dodge	109		500	$107,633
19	40	Scott Wimmer	4	Chevrolet	106		500	$85,050
20	15	Dale Jarrett	88	Ford	103		500	$119,475
21	11	Jeff Gordon	24	Chevrolet	105	5	500	$129,336
22	22	Reed Sorenson *	41	Dodge	97		499	$92,350
23	32	Dave Blaney	22	Dodge	94		499	$96,683
24	21	Ken Schrader	21	Ford	91		499	$111,014
25	12	Casey Mears	42	Dodge	88		498	$118,083
26	37	Robby Gordon	7	Chevrolet	85		497	$83,300
27	36	Terry Labonte	96	Chevrolet	82		497	$80,060
28	16	Joe Nemechek	01	Chevrolet	79		495	$109,255
29	27	Clint Bowyer *	07	Chevrolet	76		495	$90,800
30	5	Jimmie Johnson	48	Chevrolet	73		487	$128,486
31	39	Kevin Lepage	61	Ford	75	5	485	$81,150
32	34	Michael Waltrip	55	Dodge	67		481	$88,147
33	24	J. J. Yeley *	18	Chevrolet	64		469	$114,075
34	18	Jeff Burton	31	Chevrolet	61		467	$104,845
35	8	Jamie McMurray	26	Ford	58		440	$125,275
36	26	David Stremme *	40	Dodge	55		435	$86,400
37	17	Brian Vickers	25	Chevrolet	52		434	$86,350
38	25	Martin Truex Jr. *	1	Chevrolet	49		430	$86,300
39	43	Stanton Barrett	95	Chevrolet	46		381	$78,240
40	41	Travis Kvapil	32	Chevrolet	43		349	$78,165
41	38	Scott Riggs	10	Dodge	40		344	$78,115
42	31	Brent Sherman *	49	Dodge	37		302	$78,060
43	42	Hermie Sadler	00	Chevrolet	34		96	$77,481

Failed to make field: Chad Chaffin (#34), Mike Skinner (#37), Mike Garvey (#51), Derrike Cope (#74), Kenny Wallace (#78), Morgan Shepherd (#89), Chad Blount (#92).

Previous race: 2006 Golden Corral 500	Nextel Cup Series; 2006 season	Next race: 2006 DirecTV 500
