= 2008 Sylvania 300 =

Race details
- Race 27 of 36 in the 2008 NASCAR Sprint Cup Series season
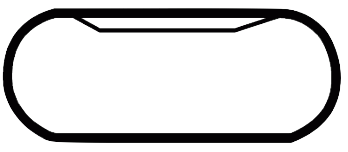
- Layout of New Hampshire Motor Speedway
- Date: September 14, 2008
- Official name: Sylvania 300
- Location: New Hampshire Motor Speedway, Loudon, New Hampshire
- Course: Permanent racing facility
- Course length: 1.058 miles (1.702 km)
- Distance: 300 laps, 317.4 mi (510.805 km)
- Weather: Mild with temperatures up to 78.1 °F (25.6 °C); wind speeds up to 9.9 miles per hour (15.9 km/h)
- Average speed: 105.468 miles per hour (169.734 km/h)

Pole position
Driver	Kyle Busch	Joe Gibbs Racing
- Time: qualified by virtue of owner's points

Most laps led
Driver	Jimmie Johnson	Hendrick Motorsports
- Laps: 96

Winner
No. 16	Greg Biffle	Roush Fenway Racing

Television in the United States
- Network: ABC
- Announcers: Jerry Punch, Dale Jarrett and Andy Petree

The 2008 Sylvania 300 was the twenty-seventh race of the 2008 NASCAR Sprint Cup season and the first race of the Chase for the Sprint Cup.

This race was the Sprint Cup Series debut of the 2018, 2022, and 2024 series champion Joey Logano.

== Summary ==
The 300-lap, 317.4 miles (510.8 km) race was held on September 14 at the 1.058 miles (1.703 km) New Hampshire Motor Speedway in Loudon, New Hampshire. ABC televised the race beginning at 1 pm US EDT with radio coverage by Performance Racing Network along with Sirius Satellite Radio starting at that same time. This was PRN's first race to be broadcast from NHMS as Motor Racing Network handled the June event following an agreement settled in May, almost one year following the purchase of the facility by Speedway Motorsports, Inc.

=== Pre-race news ===
- Joey Logano would race after the previous week's cancellation of qualifying at Richmond due to the remains of Hanna to try to qualify for this week's race.

=== Qualifying ===
After a 90-minute practice session, rain hit Loudon and washed out qualifying, so the field was lined up according to the rulebook.

=== Race recap ===
Kyle Busch, who came into the race as the top seed in the chase, suffered major mechanical problems as his sway bar was broken. Matt Kenseth was involved in a major crash and, when all was settled, Greg Biffle won and jumped to third place in the Chase standings.

Top ten finishers (Chase participants in yellow background)
Place	Car #	Driver	Car make	Team
1	16	Greg Biffle	Ford	Roush Fenway Racing
2	48	Jimmie Johnson	Chevrolet	Hendrick Motorsports
3	99	Carl Edwards	Ford	Roush Fenway Racing
4	31	Jeff Burton	Chevrolet	Richard Childress Racing
5	88	Dale Earnhardt Jr.	Chevrolet	Hendrick Motorsports
6	2	Kurt Busch	Dodge	Penske Racing
7	1	Martin Truex Jr.	Chevrolet	Dale Earnhardt, Inc.
8	20	Tony Stewart	Toyota	Joe Gibbs Racing
9	11	Denny Hamlin	Toyota	Joe Gibbs Racing
10	29	Kevin Harvick	Chevrolet	Richard Childress Racing

Failed to make race as qualifying was canceled due to rain: Tony Raines (#34) and Carl Long (#46).

Previous race: 2008 Chevy Rock & Roll 400	Sprint Cup Series; 2008 season	Next race: 2008 Camping World RV 400
