= John Carter Racing =

NASCAR team

- Owner: John Carter
- Base: Toccoa, Georgia
- Series: Sprint Cup Series
- Manufacturer: Ford Motor Company; Dodge; Toyota

Career
- Debut: 2004 Pocono 500
- Latest race: 2009 Ford 400
- Races competed: 47
- Drivers' Championships: 0
- Race victories: 0
- Pole positions: 0

John Carter Racing was a NASCAR Sprint Cup team. It was owned by John Carter. Roger Craven (no relation to Ricky Craven) and Dale Davis previously were co-owners of the team.

== Career ==
The team made its debut in 2004 at the Coca-Cola 600, originally as an offshoot of the No. 89 Victory in Jesus racing team and working out of a shop previously occupied by Frank Cicci Racing with Jim Kelly. Todd Bodine was the driver, but the team failed to qualify for the race. After a DNQ the next week at Dover International Speedway, the team made the Pocono 500, but finished 42nd after suffering overheating problems. After finishing 36th at the DHL 400, Bodine left the team, and was replaced by Chad Blount. After failing to qualify for the Pepsi 400, Blount made the field at Chicagoland Speedway, where he finished last after suffering electrical failures. Andy Hillenburg and Stanton Barrett came on to attempt races with the team, but failed. Kevin Lepage took over at the Sharpie 500, and ran the rest of the season with the team, his best finish being 27th at Phoenix International Raceway.

In 2005, the team signed sponsors BOSpoker.net and Patrón Tequila and planned to run the full year. Lepage finished ninth in the Daytona 500 but was released midway through the season. After Anthony Lazzaro ran Watkins Glen, Tony Raines took over the ride, and led two laps at Michigan before running out of fuel in the final laps. Following his release after the UAW-Ford 500, Mike Skinner, Mike Garvey, and Jimmy Spencer shared the ride for the balance of the season.

Blount returned to the No. 37 in 2006 for the Daytona 500, but missed the race. Skinner attempted most of the races with this season, along with Carl Long. In June 2006, a press release said Terance Mathis bought out the operation and renamed it Victory Motorsports, however only Dale Davis joined the ownership of the team. Skinner piloted the car at Indianapolis, and Bill Elliott started 39th and finished 16th at Kansas Speedway, the team's best showing to date. He ran an additional two races for the team, but did not finish higher 31st.

The team ran the 2007 season after partnering with the Front Row Motorsports No. 61 team. Elliott attempted the 2007 Daytona 500 with the team, but failed to qualify and the Past Champion's Provisional went to Dale Jarrett, who was the more recent former series champion not in the Top 35. John Andretti successfully made the race the next week at California Speedway and finished 34th. The deal with Front Row Motorsports fell through, and the two teams are no longer associated, with Front Row Motorsports retaining the No. 37. The team was renamed to E&M Motorsports and made its debut with Joe Nemechek, who had been released from Ginn Racing following its merger with Dale Earnhardt Inc. When Nemechek found a ride with Furniture Row Racing, E&M called upon Burney Lamar, but he DNQ'd all of his attempted races.

It was announced on January 12, 2008 that Carl Long would pilot the teams No. 08 Dodge at the Daytona 500, but he failed to qualify. The team would acquire limited sponsorship from an affiliate of German-based Rhino's Energy Drink. Burney Lamar would fail to qualify the Rhino's Dodge at Fontana, Atlanta and Texas. Tony Raines was unsuccessful in his attempts at Martinsville, Bristol and Charlotte. John Carter Racing entered into a relationship with FUBAR hydration drink during May 2008. Tony Raines would finish 23rd in the Sprint Showdown at Charlotte after experiencing mechanical issues. Johnny Sauter joined the team and made the Pepsi 500 Race at Auto Club Speedway finishing 42nd. This was the team's first and only race to date that the team has qualified for.

For the 2009 NASCAR season, E&M Motorsports signed James Hylton for the Daytona 500, and potentially more races later in the year. E&M Motorsports and Simo Racing (formerly No Fear Racing) announced that the teams would form an alliance for the Daytona 500. The alliance, to be referred to as Carter/Simo Racing, saw Hylton and Boris Said temporarily change numbers. Simo's team fielded the No. 08 Ford for Said under E&M's ownership and E&M fielded the No. 60 Dodge for Hylton under Simo's ownership. The No. 60 team had carburetor issues and was not able to run a lap at mandated practice speed, which under NASCAR rules prevented them from attempting to qualify. The No. 08 with Boris Said wrecked in his Gatorade Duel Race.

In June 2009, Carter and Said announced they would again partner. The pair brought the No. 08 Ford to Infineon raceway attempting to qualify for the Toyota Save Mart 350. Said qualified the car, 9th and finished 24th. Although originally unsponsored the team secured a sponsorship through California Outdoor Heritage Alliance.

On July 10, 2009, the team announced they had signed Terry Labonte and he would share driving duties with Boris Said. Despite still seeking a full-time sponsor, the team planned to run the remainder of the 2009 season starting July 26 at Indianapolis. On July 24, 2009, Carter Simo Racing announced it was purchasing the assets of the defunct Mayfield Motorsports team. With the purchase the team temporarily switched from Ford to Toyota, which Mayfield Motorsports was running. However, for the Heluva Good! Sour Cream Dips at The Glen in August the team returned Said to the car and switched manufacturers back to Ford. Labonte would be entered in the majority of the remaining races the team attempted, with the exception of the 2009 Dickies 500, where Derrike Cope was entered. The team withdrew before practice.

On February 3, 2010, it was announced that John Carter Racing, due to not finding sponsorship for the race team, would be auctioning off all the equipment, parts and haulers, and all three cars on February 16, 2010, by the auction company Iron Horse Auction.

== Car No. 08/37 results ==
NASCAR Sprint Cup Series results
Year	Driver	No.	Make	1	2	3	4	5	6	7	8	9	10	11	12	13	14	15	16	17	18	19	20	21	22	23	24	25	26	27	28	29	30	31	32	33	34	35	36	Owners	Pts
2004	Todd Bodine	37	Dodge	DAY	CAR	LVS	ATL	DAR	BRI	TEX	MAR	TAL	CAL	RCH	CLT; DNQ	DOV; DNQ	POC; 42	MCH; 36	SON																					45th	677
2004	Chad Blount	37	Dodge																	DAY; DNQ	CHI; 43	NHA																		45th	677
2004	Andy Hillenburg	37	Dodge																				POC; DNQ	IND; DNQ	GLN															45th	677
2004	Stanton Barrett	37	Dodge																							MCH; DNQ														45th	677
2004	Kevin Lepage	37	Dodge																								BRI; 43	CAL; DNQ	RCH; DNQ	NHA; DNQ	DOV; 36	TAL; DNQ	KAN	CLT; 39	MAR; 42	ATL; 28	PHO; 27	DAR; DNQ	HOM; DNQ	45th	677
2005	Kevin Lepage	37	Dodge	DAY; 9	CAL; 31	LVS; DNQ	ATL; 30	BRI; DNQ	MAR; 28	TEX; DNQ	PHO; 28	TAL; DNQ	DAR; 32	RCH; DNQ	CLT; 12	DOV; 33	POC; 38	MCH; 37	SON; DNQ	DAY; 25	CHI; 28	NHA; 37	POC; 35	IND; DNQ																39th	2018
2005	Anthony Lazzaro	37	Dodge																						GLN; 28															39th	2018
2005	Tony Raines	37	Dodge																							MCH; 31	BRI; DNQ	CAL; 28	RCH; 34	NHA; DNQ	DOV; 38	TAL; 22	KAN; DNQ							39th	2018
2005	Mike Garvey	37	Dodge																															CLT; DNQ						39th	2018
2005	Jimmy Spencer	37	Dodge																																MAR; 40					39th	2018
2005	Mike Skinner	37	Dodge																																	ATL; 43	TEX; 43	PHO; 37	HOM; 39	39th	2018
2006	Chad Blount	37	Dodge	DAY; DNQ	CAL																																			48th	485
2006	Mike Skinner	37	Dodge			LVS; DNQ	ATL; DNQ	BRI; DNQ	MAR	TEX	PHO	TAL	RCH											IND; 37			BRI; DNQ	CAL	RCH	NHA	DOV									48th	485
2006	Carl Long	37	Dodge											DAR; DNQ	CLT; DNQ	DOV	POC	MCH; DNQ	SON	DAY	CHI	NHA	POC																	48th	485
2006	David Murry	37	Dodge																						GLN; DNQ	MCH														48th	485
2006	Bill Elliott	37	Dodge																													KAN; 16	TAL	CLT	MAR	ATL; 41	TEX; DNQ	PHO; 31	HOM	48th	485
2007	Joe Nemechek	08	Dodge	DAY	CAL	LVS	ATL	BRI	MAR	TEX	PHO	TAL	RCH	DAR	CLT	DOV	POC	MCH	SON	NHA	DAY	CHI	IND; DNQ	POC	GLN	MCH; 43	BRI	CAL	RCH	NHA	DOV	KAN	TAL							53rd	150
2007	Carl Long	08	Dodge																															CLT; DNQ	MAR					53rd	150
2007	Burney Lamar	08	Dodge																																	ATL; DNQ	TEX; DNQ	PHO	HOM; DNQ	53rd	150
2008	Carl Long	08	Dodge	DAY; DNQ																																				47th	338
2008	Burney Lamar	08	Dodge		CAL; DNQ	LVS	ATL; DNQ	BRI		TEX; DNQ	PHO	TAL	RCH	DAR																										47th	338
2008	Tony Raines	08	Dodge						MAR; DNQ						CLT; DNQ	DOV	POC	MCH	SON	NHA	DAY																			47th	338
2008	Johnny Sauter	08	Dodge																			CHI; DNQ	IND; DNQ	POC	GLN	MCH; DNQ	BRI; DNQ	CAL; 42	RCH	NHA	DOV; DNQ	KAN; DNQ	TAL	CLT	MAR	ATL	TEX; DNQ	PHO	HOM	47th	338
2009	Boris Said	08	Ford	DAY; DNQ	CAL	LVS	ATL	BRI	MAR	TEX	PHO	TAL	RCH	DAR	CLT	DOV	POC	MCH	SON; 24	NHA	DAY	CHI			GLN; 34	MCH														50th	400
2009	Terry Labonte	08	Toyota																				IND; 33	POC			BRI; 40	ATL; 39	RCH	NHA	DOV	KAN	CAL	CLT; 37	MAR	TAL	TEX	PHO	HOM; 42	50th	400
