= Haas CNC Racing =

American NASCAR racing team

- Owner: Gene Haas
- Base: Kannapolis, North Carolina
- Series: NASCAR Sprint Cup Series; NASCAR Busch Series
- Manufacturer: Chevrolet (2002, 2004-2008), Pontiac (2003)
- Opened: 2002
- Closed: 2008

Career
- Debut: Sprint Cup Series: 2002 Protection One 400 (Kansas); Busch Series: 2003 Mr. Goodcents 300 (Kansas)
- Latest race: Sprint Cup Series: 2008 Ford 400 (Homestead); Busch Series: 2006 Ford 300 (Homestead)
- Races competed: Total: 394; Sprint Cup Series: 284; Busch Series: 110
- Drivers' Championships: Total: 0 Sprint Cup Series: 0 Busch Series: 0
- Race victories: Total: 1 Sprint Cup Series: 0 Busch Series: 1
- Pole positions: Total: 2 Sprint Cup Series: 0 Busch Series: 2

Haas CNC Racing was an American professional stock car racing team that competed in the NASCAR Sprint Cup Series and NASCAR Busch Series. Founded in 2002 by Gene Haas, the founder of Haas Automation, the team was established after Haas—then a sponsor of Hendrick Motorsports—decided to start his own operation. The team ceased operations after the 2008 season, merging into Stewart–Haas Racing when three-time NASCAR champion Tony Stewart joined as a driver and acquired a 50% ownership stake.

The team was based and headquartered in Kannapolis, North Carolina – roughly 10 miles (16 km) north of Charlotte Motor Speedway – alongside sister team and Formula One entrant Haas F1 Team.

== History ==
After years as an associate sponsor of Hendrick Motorsports, Gene Haas announced in April 2002 that he would start his own Winston Cup team for the 2003 season. Hendrick agreed to supply cars, engines, and technical support. Haas signed Jack Sprague—who had spent six years driving in the Busch and Craftsman Truck Series for Hendrick—as the team's driver. Sprague brought his NetZero sponsorship with him, and the car was designated to No. 0. Initially, the team operated out of a small shop rented from Hendrick Motorsports. After running Chevrolets in late 2002, Haas CNC joined several General Motors teams in switching to Pontiac for 2003, before returning to Chevrolet when Pontiac exited the sport. Haas CNC also fielded a part-time Busch Series team in 2003, expanding to full-time in 2004.

On July 10, 2008, it was announced that two-time Sprint Cup Series champion Tony Stewart would join the team as both a driver and co-owner for the 2009 season, acquiring a 50% stake. Dissatisfied with Joe Gibbs Racing’s switch from Chevrolet to Toyota, Stewart wanted to return to racing with Chevrolet. Meanwhile, team owner Haas sought Stewart’s star power to attract sponsors and talent. The team was ultimately shut down and merged into Stewart–Haas Racing.

== Sprint Cup Series ==
=== Car No. 66 history ===
Jack Sprague and Multiple Drivers (2002–2003)

The No. 0 car, sponsored by NetZero and driven by Jack Sprague, debuted as a Pontiac under Haas in 2003. Sprague opened the season with a career-best 14th-place finish at the Daytona 500, but the team soon began to struggle. After a 40th-place finish at Chicagoland, Sprague was released and replaced by John Andretti, who finished 41st at New Hampshire and 33rd at Pocono, before qualifying 15th and finishing 19th at Watkins Glen. Due to Andretti’s prior commitment with Dale Earnhardt, Inc., Jason Leffler drove the car at the Brickyard 400, finishing 33rd. Although Leffler lost his ride in the No. 2 truck for Ultra Motorsports in the NASCAR Craftsman Truck Series because of that start, Haas soon hired him as the team’s full-time driver.

Ward Burton (2003–2004)

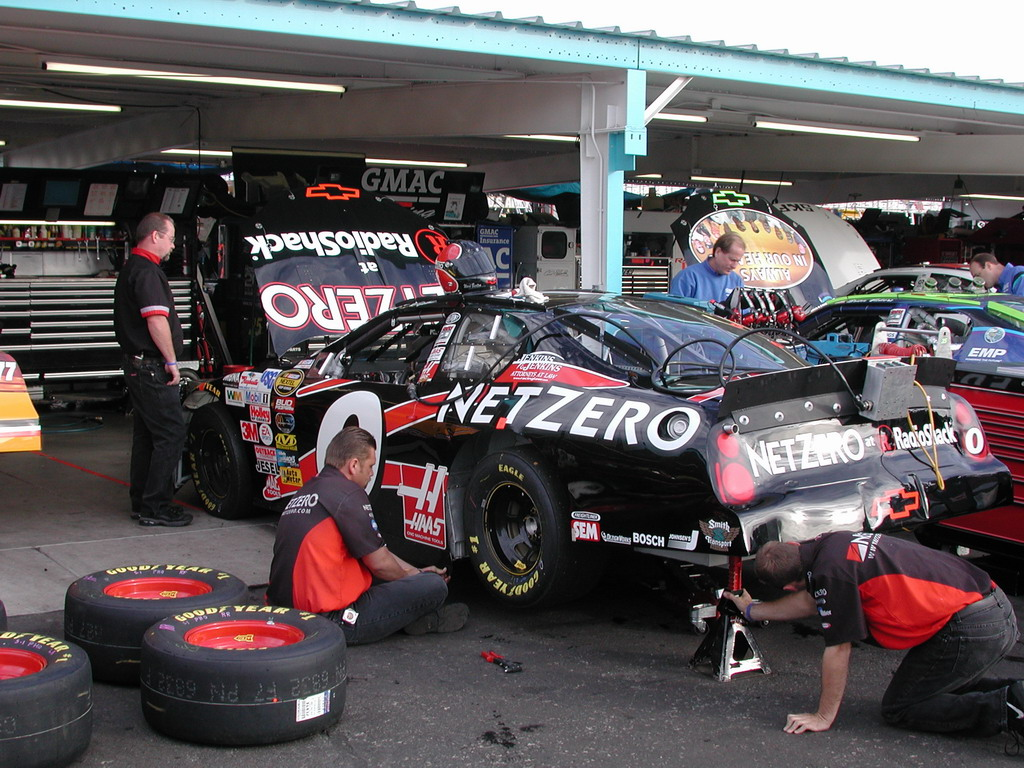
2004 No. 0 NetZero Chevrolet

Ward Burton took over driving duties late in the 2003 season after eight years with Bill Davis Racing, while Jason Leffler moved to the Busch Series to drive the No. 00 car. Burton's best finishes in the final four races were 13th at Atlanta and 18th at Rockingham.

In the 2004 off-season, Pontiac exited NASCAR, prompting the team to switch back to Chevrolet. Burton started the year with a 17th-place finish at the Daytona 500 and followed it with a 9th at Rockingham, putting the team 9th in points. Despite two top-20s in the next three races, the team began to slide. A 10th-place run at California broke the slump, followed by five consecutive top-20 finishes. Burton earned an outside pole at the Brickyard 400 but crashed early, finishing 39th. He scored another 10th-place finish at Talladega in October but ended up 40th at Phoenix.

Mike Bliss (2004–2005)

Burton was soon replaced by 2002 NASCAR Craftsman Truck Series champion Mike Bliss, who debuted with a 10th-place finish at Darlington and was signed for the 2005 season. That year, Best Buy joined as an associate and four-race primary sponsor, with the U.S. Coast Guard backing one race. Bliss started the season with four consecutive 18th-place finishes and later posted top-10s at Pocono (9th) and Bristol (7th), but was released at season's end.

Jeff Green (2006–2007)

For 2006 Jeff Green replaced Mike Bliss as the driver. Best Buy became the primary sponsor, taking over after NetZero's departure. The car number was changed to 66 in honor of the year Best Buy opened its first store in 1966. Green finished 28th in the 2006 standings and was re-signed for the 2007 season. However, on October 22, 2007, it was announced that Jeremy Mayfield would replace Green for the final four races of the year. Following the season, Best Buy left to sponsor Elliott Sadler’s No. 19 Dodge at Gillett Evernham Motorsports.

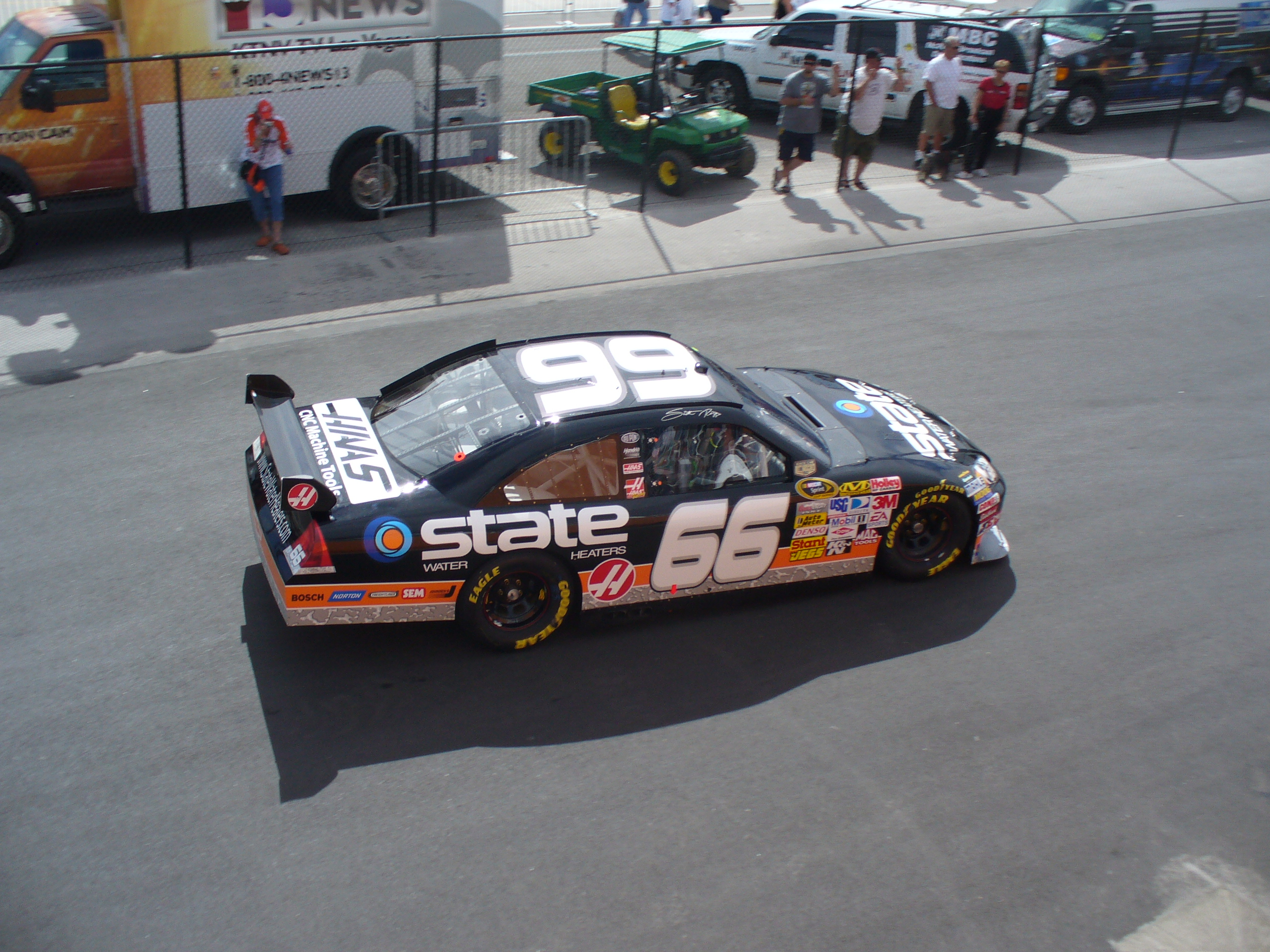
Scott Riggs in the No. 66 at Las Vegas Motor Speedway in 2008

Scott Riggs (2008)

In 2008, former Evernham driver Scott Riggs took over the No. 66 car, bringing sponsorship from State Water Heaters after moving from Morgan–McClure Motorsports. Additional sponsors included Hunt Brothers Pizza and Haas Automation. Although Riggs initially struggled, his performance improved following the mid-summer announcement that Tony Stewart would become the team's new co-owner. Riggs finished the season inside the top 35 in points but was ultimately released in favor of Ryan Newman, who had recently left Penske Racing to join the newly formed Stewart–Haas Racing team.

==== Car No. 66 results ====
Year	Driver	No.	Make	1	2	3	4	5	6	7	8	9	10	11	12	13	14	15	16	17	18	19	20	21	22	23	24	25	26	27	28	29	30	31	32	33	34	35	36	Owners	Pts
2003	Jack Sprague	0	Pontiac	DAY; 14	CAR; 34	LVS; 26	ATL; 37	DAR; 40	BRI; 35	TEX; 22	TAL; 34	MAR; 29	CAL; 39	RCH; 26	CLT; 22	DOV; 41	POC; 22	MCH; 19	SON; 39	DAY; 31	CHI; 40																			39th	2056
2003	John Andretti	0	Pontiac																			NHA; 41	POC; 33		GLN; 19															39th	2056
2003	Jason Leffler	0	Pontiac																					IND; 33		MCH; 35	BRI; 26	DAR; 26	RCH; 28	NHA; 27	DOV; 25	TAL; DNQ	KAN; 30	CLT; 35	MAR; 27					39th	2056
2003	Ward Burton	0	Pontiac																																	ATL; 13	PHO; 41	CAR; 18	HOM; 32	39th	2056
2004	Ward Burton	0	Chevy	DAY; 17	CAR; 9	LVS; 26	ATL; 13	DAR; 18	BRI; 28	TEX; 32	MAR; 22	TAL; 40	CAL; 10	RCH; 20	CLT; 16	DOV; 19	POC; 17	MCH; 30	SON; 24	DAY; 40	CHI; 19	NHA; 29	POC; 31	IND; 39	GLN; 37	MCH; 30	BRI; 18	CAL; 31	RCH; 40	NHA; 25	DOV; 37	TAL; 10	KAN; 30	CLT; 19	MAR; 28	ATL; 30	PHO; 40			31st	3106
2004	Mike Bliss	0	Chevy																																			DAR; 10	HOM; 40	31st	3106
2005	Mike Bliss	0	Chevy	DAY; 18	CAL; 12	LVS; 16	ATL; 18	BRI; 37	MAR; 36	TEX; 22	PHO; 20	TAL; 36	DAR; 19	RCH; 37	CLT; 15	DOV; 18	POC; 35	MCH; 27	SON; 39	DAY; 20	CHI; 34	NHA; 21	POC; 9	IND; 11	GLN; 26	MCH; 37	BRI; 7	CAL; 27	RCH; 15	NHA; 36	DOV; 30	TAL; 32	KAN; 15	CLT; 35	MAR; 41	ATL; 13	TEX; 17	PHO; 31	HOM; 12	29th	3262
2006	Jeff Green	66	Chevy	DAY; 42	CAL; 24	LVS; 18	ATL; 26	BRI; 15	MAR; 25	TEX; 18	PHO; 18	TAL; 14	RCH; 18	DAR; 32	CLT; 12	DOV; 28	POC; 37	MCH; 33	SON; 19	DAY; 26	CHI; 27	NHA; 26	POC; 35	IND; 38	GLN; 15	MCH; 27	BRI; 24	CAL; 22	RCH; 41	NHA; 43	DOV; 20	KAN; 30	TAL; 7	CLT; 16	MAR; 8	ATL; 23	TEX; 13	PHO; 37	HOM; 22	29th	3253
2007	Jeff Green	66	Chevy	DAY; 36	CAL; 30	LVS; 25	ATL; 35	BRI; 6	MAR; 36	TEX; 26	PHO; 6	TAL; 13	RCH; 24	DAR; 22	CLT; 42	DOV; 30	POC; 32	MCH; 36	SON; 42	NHA; 6	DAY; 37	CHI; 27	IND; 43	POC; 19	GLN; 20	MCH; 22	BRI; 27	CAL; 23	RCH; 33	NHA; 27	DOV; 31	KAN; 20	TAL; 13	CLT; 32	MAR; 28					31st	2704
2007	Jeremy Mayfield	66	Chevy																																	ATL; 40	TEX; 22	PHO; 41	HOM; 26	31st	2704
2008	Scott Riggs	66	Chevy	DAY; 21	CAL; 21	LVS; 36	ATL; 18	BRI; 22	MAR; 41	TEX; 27	PHO; 26	TAL; 16	RCH; 19	DAR; 17	CLT; 28	DOV; 39	POC; 21	MCH; 33		NHA; 34	DAY; DNQ	CHI; 20	IND; 25	POC; 29	GLN; 34	MCH; 15	BRI; 27	CAL; 25	RCH; 31	NHA; 19	DOV; 25	KAN; 42	TAL; 7	CLT; 19	MAR; 21	ATL; 43	TEX; 25	PHO; 38	HOM; 14	30th	2797
2008	Max Papis	66	Chevy																SON; 35																					30th	2797

=== Car No. 70 history ===
Multiple Drivers (2002–2004)

The No. 60 car debuted in 2002 as a fifth entry for Hendrick Motorsports, with Gene Haas listed as the owner. Jack Sprague, Hendrick's Busch Series driver, attempted six races (qualifying for three) to prepare for a full-time run with Haas. His best finish was 30th at the season finale in Homestead–Miami.

In 2003, while Sprague and Haas ran the No. 0 Pontiac full-time, the No. 60 Chevy returned under the Hendrick banner with David Green. Sponsored by Haas Automation, with support from Kellogg's and NetZero, the team initially targeted restrictor plate races. They failed to qualify for the first two, then finished 32nd at Daytona and 35th at Talladega, running full NetZero branding after the No. 0 car missed the field. Later that year, Brian Vickers made his Cup debut in the No. 60 at Charlotte, qualifying 20th and finishing 33rd before moving full-time to Hendrick's No. 25.

In 2004, Jason Leffler drove the No. 60 at Indianapolis but crashed early, finishing last.

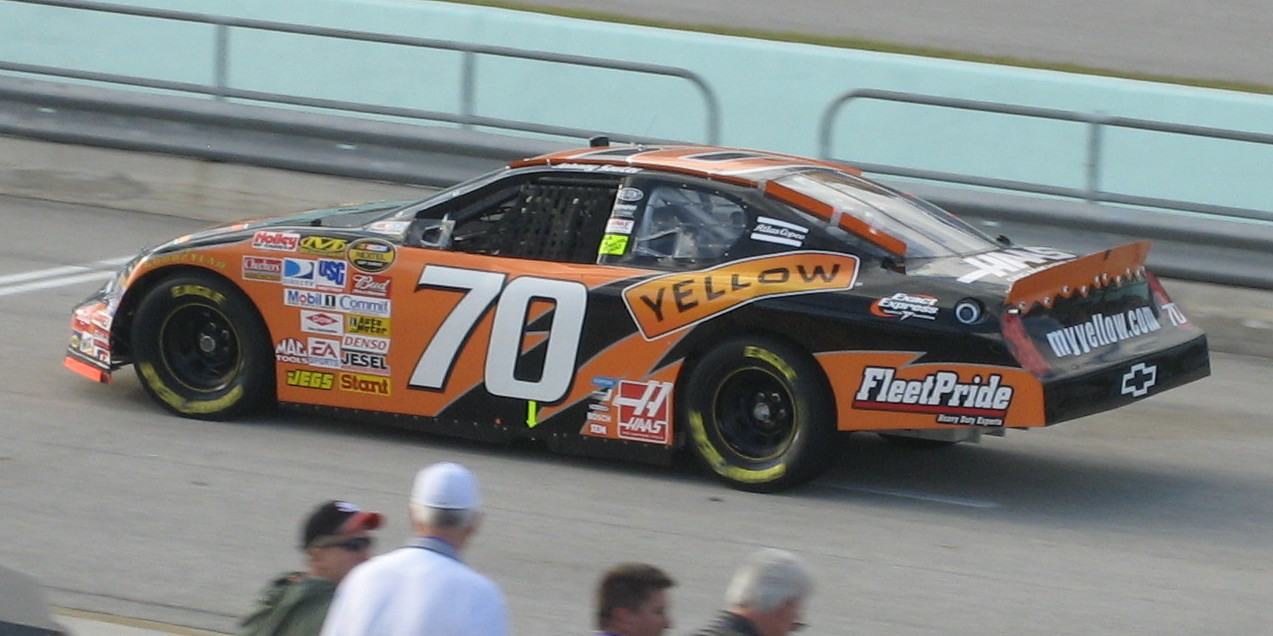
Johnny Sauter in the No. 70 in 2007.

Johnny Sauter (2006–2007)

The No. 70 car made its debut as the second Haas entry at the 2006 Coca-Cola 600, driven by Johnny Sauter. He ran in the top 10 for most of the race before a blown tire caused him to crash. The team made another attempt later that season at the Brickyard 400 but failed to qualify. In 2007, it was announced that the No. 70 would compete full-time, with Sauter and sponsor Yellow Transportation moving up from the Busch Series. After the first five races, Sauter and the team worked their way into the top 35 in Owner's Points—securing a guaranteed starting spot—but missed the Food City 500 at Bristol. Despite that setback, they earned top-10 finishes at 9th in the Subway Fresh Fit 500 and 5th in the Chevy Rock & Roll 400.

Multiple drivers (2008)

In 2008, Jeremy Mayfield began the season driving for the team after competing in several races in their No. 66 car in late 2007. After falling out of the Top 35 in Owner’s Points following the seventh race, Mayfield and Haas CNC split. The rest of the season was completed by Johnny Sauter, Jason Leffler, Tony Raines, and others.

==== Car No. 70 results ====
Year	Driver	No.	Make	1	2	3	4	5	6	7	8	9	10	11	12	13	14	15	16	17	18	19	20	21	22	23	24	25	26	27	28	29	30	31	32	33	34	35	36	Owners	Pts
2002	Jack Sprague	60	Chevy	DAY	CAR	LVS	ATL	DAR	BRI	TEX	MAR	TAL	CAL	RCH	CLT	DOV	POC	MCH	SON	DAY	CHI	NHA	POC	IND	GLN	MCH	BRI	DAR	RCH	NHA	DOV	KAN; 35	TAL	CLT; DNQ	MAR	ATL; DNQ	CAR; 35	PHO; DNQ	HOM; 30	57th	189
2004	Jason Leffler	60	Chevy	DAY	CAR	LVS	ATL	DAR	BRI	TEX	MAR	TAL	CAL	RCH	CLT	DOV	POC	MCH	SON	DAY	CHI	NHA	POC	IND; 43	GLN	MCH	BRI	CAL	RCH	NHA	DOV	TAL	KAN	CLT	MAR	ATL	PHO	DAR	HOM	88th	34
2006	Johnny Sauter	70	Chevy	DAY	CAL	LVS	ATL	BRI	MAR	TEX	PHO	TAL	RCH	DAR	CLT; 24	DOV	POC	MCH	SON	DAY	CHI	NHA	POC	IND; DNQ	GLN	MCH	BRI	CAL	RCH	NHA	DOV	KAN	TAL	CLT	MAR	ATL	TEX	PHO	HOM	77th	0
2007	Johnny Sauter	70	Chevy	DAY; 16	CAL; 18	LVS; 39	ATL; 29	BRI; DNQ	MAR; 31	TEX; 22	PHO; 9	TAL; 30	RCH; 36	DAR; 29	CLT; 27	DOV; 32	POC; 40	MCH; 26	SON; 31	NHA; 14	DAY; 18	CHI; 22	IND; 37	POC; 36	GLN; 23	MCH; 29	BRI; 42	CAL; 30	RCH; 5	NHA; 28	DOV; 42	KAN; 23	TAL; 12	CLT; 23	MAR; 29	ATL; 32	TEX; 27	PHO; 15	HOM; 41	33rd	2875
2008	Jeremy Mayfield	70	Chevy	DAY; 23	CAL; 39	LVS; 16	ATL; 39	BRI; 30	MAR; 32	TEX; 38																														43rd	2048
2008	Johnny Sauter	70	Chevy								PHO; 37		RCH; 33	DAR; DNQ	CLT; 35					NHA; 37	DAY; 28								RCH; 41	NHA; 20								PHO; 37		43rd	2048
2008	Ken Schrader	70	Chevy									TAL; 42																												43rd	2048
2008	Jason Leffler	70	Chevy													DOV; DNQ	POC; 40	MCH; DNQ				CHI; 27	IND; 32																	43rd	2048
2008	Scott Riggs	70	Chevy																SON; DNQ																					43rd	2048
2008	Tony Raines	70	Chevy																					POC; 18		MCH; 31	BRI; 17	CAL; DNQ			DOV; 28	KAN; 23	TAL; 34	CLT; 40	MAR; 31	ATL; 32	TEX; DNQ		HOM; 37	43rd	2048
2008	Max Papis	70	Chevy																						GLN; 43															43rd	2048

== Busch Series ==
=== Car No. 00 history ===
Jason Leffler (2003–2004)

The Haas team debuted in the 2003 season with the No. 00 Haas Automation Chevrolet. Troy Cline attempted four races, failing to qualify twice before making the field at Fontana using Aramendia Motorsports’ No. 79 owner points. Jason Leffler took over for the final four races, debuting at Kansas with an 11th-place start and 16th-place finish despite a wreck. He followed with 11th-place finishes at Charlotte and Phoenix, then earned his first top-five by finishing 4th after starting 14th.

The team went full-time in 2004. After a slow start, Leffler had just two finishes outside the top 15—a 34th at California and a 17th at Bristol. He also earned a pole at California and scored his and Haas’ first win at Nashville. Leffler signed with Joe Gibbs Racing for a Cup ride in 2005 and was released from Haas CNC before the end of 2004. Hendrick development driver Blake Feese replaced him, starting seventh at Kansas, but struggled in all four of his starts. As Feese faltered, Haas continued to search for a driver and promoted crew chief Bootie Barker to the Cup program. Tony Raines finished tenth at Phoenix, and Justin Labonte drove the remaining races.

Justin Labonte (2005)

In 2005, Justin Labonte drove full-time in the newly renumbered No. 44 U.S. Coast Guard Chevy for Labonte-Haas Motorsports, a merger between Haas CNC and Labonte Motorsports. He had limited success, with a best finish of 7th at Talladega and 10th at Charlotte. After finishing 17th in points, he was released at season’s end. The No. 44, a Labonte family number, was not fielded by Haas again.

Johnny Sauter (2006)

In 2006, Johnny Sauter was hired to drive the No. 00 car, sponsored by Yellow Transportation. After finishing 8th in the Busch Series standings, the team moved up to the Cup Series as the No. 70. The Busch program was shut down, and its equipment sold to Jay Robinson Racing.

==== Car No. 00 results ====
Year	Team	No.	Make	1	2	3	4	5	6	7	8	9	10	11	12	13	14	15	16	17	18	19	20	21	22	23	24	25	26	27	28	29	30	31	32	33	34	35	Owners	Pts
2003	Troy Cline	00	Chevy	DAY	CAR	LVS; DNQ	DAR	BRI	TEX; DNQ	TAL	NSH	CAL	RCH; 38	GTY	NZH	CLT	DOV	NSH	KEN	MLW	DAY	CHI	NHA	PPR	IRP	MCH	BRI	DAR	RCH	DOV									52nd	777
2003	Jason Leffler	00	Chevy																												KAN; 16	CLT; 11	MEM	ATL; 22	PHO; 11	CAR; 22	HOM; 4		52nd	777
2004	Jason Leffler	00	Chevy	DAY; 8	CAR; 32	LVS; 22	DAR; 14	BRI; 32	TEX; 6	NSH; 9	TAL; 5	CAL; 34	GTY; 6	RCH; 11	NZH; 7	CLT; 4	DOV; 14	NSH; 1*	KEN; 7	MLW; 15	DAY; 13	CHI; 7	NHA; 3	PPR; 3	IRP; 3	MCH; 7	BRI; 17	CAL; 10	RCH; 4	DOV; 4									12th	3661
2004	Blake Feese	00	Chevy																												KAN; 24	CLT; 27	MEM; 40	ATL; 25					12th	3661
2004	Tony Raines	00	Chevy																																PHO; 10				12th	3661
2004	Justin Labonte	00	Chevy																																	DAR; 19			12th	3661
2004	Justin Labonte	44	Chevy																																		HOM; 17		12th	3661
2005	Justin Labonte	44	Chevy	DAY; 18	CAL; 19	MXC; 25	LVS; 13	ATL; 42	NSH; 13	BRI; 40	TEX; 33	PHO; 20	TAL; 7	DAR; 18	RCH; 32	CLT; 22	DOV; 23	NSH; 29	KEN; 11	MLW; 16	DAY; 34	CHI; 41	NHA; 41	PPR; 13	GTY; 13	IRP; 22	GLN; 16	MCH; 17	BRI; 23	CAL; 36	RCH; 22	DOV; 26	KAN; 25	CLT; 10	MEM; 12	TEX; 24	PHO; 22	HOM; 21	17th	3285
2006	Johnny Sauter	00	Chevy	DAY; 35	CAL; 13	MXC; 6	LVS; 15	ATL; 12	BRI; 10	TEX; 14	NSH; 27	PHO; 36	TAL; 8	RCH; 11	DAR; 34	CLT; 11	DOV; 21	NSH; 14	KEN; 32	MLW; 9	DAY; 21	CHI; 17	NHA; 6	MAR; 5	GTY; 18	IRP; 42	GLN; 19	MCH; 35	BRI; 11	CAL; 31	RCH; 15	DOV; 24	KAN; 35	CLT; 6	MEM; 4	TEX; 35	PHO; 11	HOM; 10	8th	3794

== Camping World Truck Series and driver development ==
The team had an agreement for Camping World Truck Series team MRD Motorsports to be the driver development team for Haas CNC Racing which Blake Bjorklund was named the driver for the 2007 season. Bjorklund was originally scheduled to drive 12 races for MRD but ran most of the schedule before being replaced by Chad McCumbee.
