= 2008 Samsung 500 =

Race details
- Race 7 of 36 in the 2008 NASCAR Sprint Cup Series
- 2008 Samsung 500 program cover
- Date: April 6, 2008
- Official name: Samsung 500
- Location: Texas Motor Speedway in Fort Worth, Texas
- Course: Permanent racing facility
- Course length: 1.5 miles (2.4 km)
- Distance: 339 laps, 508.5 mi (818.351 km)
- Scheduled distance: 334 laps, 501 mi (806.281 km)
- Weather: Temperatures reaching up to 81 °F (27 °C); wind speeds up to 15.9 miles per hour (25.6 km/h)
- Average speed: 144.814 miles per hour (233.056 km/h)

Pole position
Driver	Dale Earnhardt Jr.	Hendrick Motorsports
- Time: 28.344

Most laps led
Driver	Carl Edwards	Roush Fenway Racing
- Laps: 123

Winner
No. 99	Carl Edwards	Roush Fenway Racing

Television in the United States
- Network: Fox Broadcasting Company
- Announcers: Mike Joy, Darrell Waltrip and Larry McReynolds

The 2008 Samsung 500 was the seventh race for the 2008 NASCAR Sprint Cup season and run on Sunday, April 6 at Texas Motor Speedway in Fort Worth, Texas. The race was broadcast on television by Fox starting at 1:30 PM EDT, and broadcast via radio and Sirius Satellite Radio on the Performance Racing Network beginning at 1 PM EDT.

== Entry list ==
Car	Driver	Make	Team
00	Michael McDowell	Toyota	Michael Waltrip Racing
01	Regan Smith	Chevrolet	Dale Earnhardt, Inc.
1	Martin Truex Jr.	Chevrolet	Dale Earnhardt, Inc.
2	Kurt Busch	Dodge	Penske Racing
5	Casey Mears	Chevrolet	Hendrick Motorsports
6	David Ragan	Ford	Roush Fenway Racing
07	Clint Bowyer	Chevrolet	Richard Childress Racing
7	Robby Gordon	Dodge	Robby Gordon Motorsports
08	Burney Lamar	Dodge	E&M Motorsports
8	Mark Martin	Chevrolet	Dale Earnhardt, Inc.
9	Kasey Kahne	Dodge	Gillett Evernham Motorsports
10	Patrick Carpentier	Dodge	Gillett Evernham Motorsports
11	Denny Hamlin	Toyota	Joe Gibbs Racing
12	Ryan Newman	Dodge	Penske Racing
15	Paul Menard	Chevrolet	Dale Earnhardt, Inc.
16	Greg Biffle	Ford	Roush Fenway Racing
17	Matt Kenseth	Ford	Roush Fenway Racing
18	Kyle Busch	Toyota	Joe Gibbs Racing
19	Elliott Sadler	Dodge	Gillett Evernham Motorsports
20	Tony Stewart	Toyota	Joe Gibbs Racing
21	Bill Elliott	Ford	Wood Brothers Racing
22	Dave Blaney	Toyota	Bill Davis Racing
24	Jeff Gordon	Chevrolet	Hendrick Motorsports
26	Jamie McMurray	Ford	Roush Fenway Racing
28	Travis Kvapil	Ford	Yates Racing
29	Kevin Harvick	Chevrolet	Richard Childress Racing
31	Jeff Burton	Chevrolet	Richard Childress Racing
34	John Andretti	Chevrolet	Front Row Motorsports
38	David Gilliland	Ford	Yates Racing
40	Dario Franchitti	Dodge	Chip Ganassi Racing with Felix Sabates
41	Reed Sorenson	Dodge	Chip Ganassi Racing with Felix Sabates
42	Juan Pablo Montoya	Dodge	Chip Ganassi Racing with Felix Sabates
43	Bobby Labonte	Dodge	Petty Enterprises
44	David Reutimann	Toyota	Michael Waltrip Racing
45	Chad McCumbee	Dodge	Petty Enterprises
48	Jimmie Johnson	Chevrolet	Hendrick Motorsports
55	Michael Waltrip	Toyota	Michael Waltrip Racing
66	Scott Riggs	Chevrolet	Haas CNC Racing
70	Jeremy Mayfield	Chevrolet	Haas CNC Racing
77	Sam Hornish Jr.	Dodge	Penske Racing
78	Joe Nemechek	Chevrolet	Furniture Row Racing
83	Brian Vickers	Toyota	Red Bull Racing Team
84	Mike Skinner	Toyota	Red Bull Racing Team
88	Dale Earnhardt Jr.	Chevrolet	Hendrick Motorsports
96	J.J. Yeley	Toyota	Hall of Fame Racing
99	Carl Edwards	Ford	Roush Fenway Racing

== Pre race notes ==
- Chad McCumbee replaced Kyle Petty in the #45 Petty Enterprises Dodge ride this week; however, for the second straight race, the #45 car failed to qualify.
- BAM Racing will skip both this week's race and the following race at Phoenix as their transition to Toyota has been harder than they thought.

== Qualifying ==
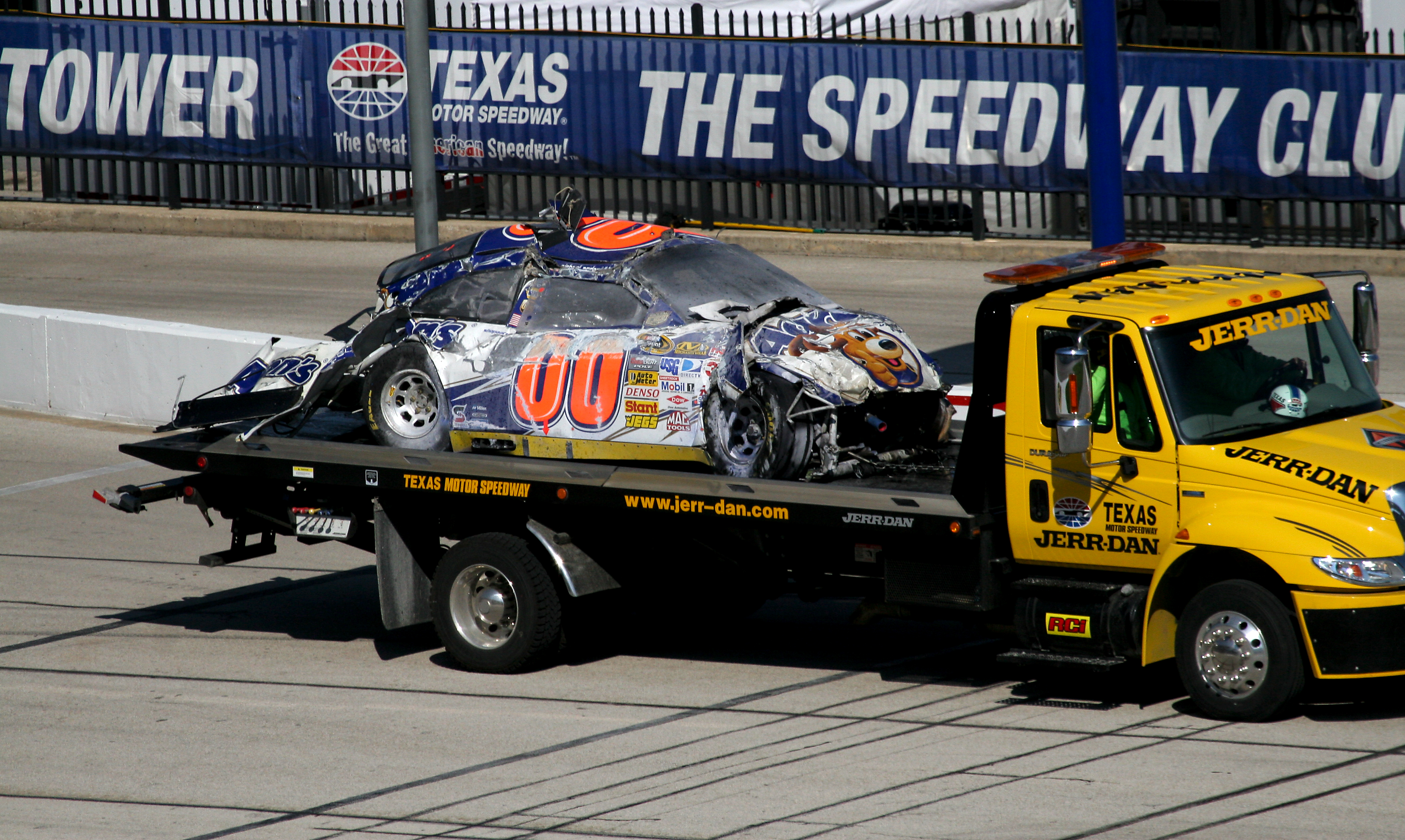
Michael McDowell's destroyed racecar being taken away after a horrifying crash going into Turn One of the track during a qualifying round

Dale Earnhardt Jr. won his first pole as a member of Hendrick Motorsports, with a speed of just under 191 mph.

However, the major story to come out of this was the spectacular crash of Michael McDowell into Turn One during his second qualifying lap in the #00 Toyota for Michael Waltrip Racing. Going into Turn 1, McDowell said on the radio "Way too tight!" The car proceeded to turn sharply left, then when McDowell tried to correct it, the car sharply steered hardly to the right, plowing head-first into the SAFER barrier at over 180 mph, causing his car to barrel-roll 8 times with fire coming from the engine compartment. McDowell was shown to be moving around in the car when the car landed on its wheels in the middle of Turns 1 and 2, and seconds later was able to get out of the car under his own power, uninjured. Due to the fact that his primary car was destroyed, he was forced into the rear of the field in a backup. The crash would prove the safety of the Car of Tomorrow, which had been criticized for its looks. For most of McDowell's career, this would be his legacy; proving the safety of the Car of Tomorrow until the 2021 season, when in a stunning upset McDowell would pass Brad Keselowski and Joey Logano on the final lap to win the 2021 Daytona 500.

Pos.	Car	Driver	Make	Avg. Speed (mph)	Time	Behind
1	88	Dale Earnhardt Jr	Chevrolet	190.907	28.286	0.000
2	99	Carl Edwards	Ford	189.487	28.498	00.212
3	18	Kyle Busch	Toyota	189.069	28.561	00.275
4	12	Ryan Newman	Dodge	189.042	28.565	00.279
5	48	Jimmie Johnson	Chevrolet	188.772	28.606	00.320
6	44	David Reutimann	Toyota	188.732	28.612	00.326
7	6	David Ragan	Ford	188.534	28.642	00.356
8	17	Matt Kenseth	Ford	188.475	28.651	00.365
9	84	Mike Skinner	Toyota	188.390	28.664	00.378
10	9	Kasey Kahne	Dodge	188.245	28.686	00.400
11	42	Juan Pablo Montoya	Dodge	188.160	28.699	00.413
12	1	Martin Truex Jr	Chevrolet	188.140	28.702	00.416
13	66	Scott Riggs	Chevrolet	188.009	28.722	00.436
14	11	Denny Hamlin	Toyota	187.990	28.725	00.439
15	7	Robby Gordon	Dodge	187.931	28.734	00.448
16	16	Greg Biffle	Ford	187.865	28.744	00.458
17	77	Sam Hornish Jr	Dodge	187.741	28.763	00.477
18	24	Jeff Gordon	Chevrolet	187.611	28.783	00.497
19	15	Paul Menard	Chevrolet	187.598	28.785	00.499
20	55	Michael Waltrip	Toyota	187.591	28.786	00.500
21	29	Kevin Harvick	Chevrolet	187.493	28.801	00.515
22	5	Casey Mears	Chevrolet	187.474	28.804	00.518
23	2	Kurt Busch	Dodge	187.311	28.829	00.543
24	20	Tony Stewart	Toyota	187.195	28.847	00.561
25	07	Clint Bowyer	Chevrolet	187.156	28.853	00.567
26	19	Elliott Sadler	Dodge	187.007	28.876	00.590
27	10	Patrick Carpentier	Dodge	186.981	28.880	00.594
28	21	Bill Elliott	Ford	186.974	28.881	00.595
29	22	Dave Blaney	Toyota	186.948	28.885	00.599
30	43	Bobby Labonte	Dodge	186.935	28.887	00.601
31	8	Mark Martin	Chevrolet	186.793	28.909	00.623
32	26	Jamie McMurray	Ford	186.645	28.932	00.646
33	96	JJ Yeley	Toyota	186.220	28.998	00.712
34	01	Regan Smith	Chevrolet	186.046	29.025	00.739
35	31	Jeff Burton	Chevrolet	185.995	29.033	00.747
36	83	Brian Vickers	Toyota	185.752	29.071	00.785
37	34	John Andretti	Chevrolet	185.669	29.084	00.798
38	28	Travis Kvapil	Ford	185.631	29.090	00.804
39	70	Jeremy Mayfield	Chevrolet	185.350	29.134	00.848
40	00	Michael McDowell	Toyota	182.933	29.519	01.233
41	38	David Gilliland	Ford	0.000	00.000	0.000
42	41	Reed Sorenson	Dodge	0.000	00.000	0.000
43	78	Joe Nemechek	Chevrolet	185.191	29.159	00.873
Failed to qualify
44	40	Dario Franchitti	Dodge			
45	45	Chad McCumbee	Dodge			
46	08	Burney Lamar	Dodge			
WD	49	Ken Schrader	Toyota			

Failed to qualify: Burney Lamar (#08), Dario Franchitti (#40), Chad McCumbee (#45).

== Race recap ==
The race was won by Carl Edwards. Jimmie Johnson, Kyle Busch, Ryan Newman and Denny Hamlin would round out the top five while Jeff Burton, Tony Stewart, Mark Martin, Matt Kenseth and Clint Bowyer would be the remaining finishers in the top ten finishing order.

== Results ==
Fin	St	#	Driver	Make	Team	Laps	Led	Status	Pts
1	2	99	Carl Edwards	Ford	Roush Fenway Racing	339	123	running	195
2	5	48	Jimmie Johnson	Chevy	Hendrick Motorsports	339	65	running	175
3	3	18	Kyle Busch	Toyota	Joe Gibbs Racing	339	50	running	170
4	4	12	Ryan Newman	Dodge	Penske Racing	339	0	running	135
5	14	11	Denny Hamlin	Toyota	Joe Gibbs Racing	339	0	running	155
6	35	31	Jeff Burton	Chevy	Richard Childress Racing	339	0	running	150
7	24	20	Tony Stewart	Toyota	Joe Gibbs Racing	339	0	running	146
8	31	8	Mark Martin	Chevy	Dale Earnhardt, Inc.	339	0	running	142
9	8	17	Matt Kenseth	Ford	Roush Fenway Racing	339	68	running	143
10	25	07	Clint Bowyer	Chevy	Richard Childress Racing	339	0	running	134
11	21	29	Kevin Harvick	Chevy	Richard Childress Racing	338	0	running	130
12	1	88	Dale Earnhardt Jr.	Chevy	Hendrick Motorsports	338	31	running	132
13	7	6	David Ragan	Ford	Roush Fenway Racing	338	0	running	124
14	32	26	Jamie McMurray	Ford	Roush Fenway Racing	338	0	running	121
15	41	38	David Gilliland	Ford	Yates Racing	338	0	running	118
16	36	83	Brian Vickers	Toyota	Red Bull Racing Team	338	0	running	115
17	19	15	Paul Menard	Chevy	Dale Earnhardt, Inc.	338	0	running	112
18	38	28	Travis Kvapil	Ford	Yates Racing	338	0	running	109
19	11	42	Juan Pablo Montoya	Dodge	Chip Ganassi Racing with Felix Sabates	337	0	running	106
20	30	43	Bobby Labonte	Dodge	Petty Enterprises	337	0	running	103
21	29	22	Dave Blaney	Toyota	Bill Davis Racing	337	0	running	100
22	22	5	Casey Mears	Chevy	Hendrick Motorsports	337	0	running	97
23	23	2	Kurt Busch	Dodge	Penske Racing	337	0	running	94
24	42	41	Reed Sorenson	Dodge	Chip Ganassi Racing with Felix Sabates	337	0	running	91
25	10	9	Kasey Kahne	Dodge	Gillett Evernham Motorsports	336	0	running	88
26	26	19	Elliott Sadler	Dodge	Gillett Evernham Motorsports	336	0	running	85
27	13	66	Scott Riggs	Chevy	Haas CNC Racing	336	0	running	82
28	27	10	Patrick Carpentier	Dodge	Gillett Evernham Motorsports	335	0	running	79
29	9	84	Mike Skinner	Toyota	Red Bull Racing Team	334	0	running	76
30	15	7	Robby Gordon	Dodge	Robby Gordon Motorsports	334	0	running	73
31	20	55	Michael Waltrip	Toyota	Michael Waltrip Racing	333	0	running	70
32	17	77	Sam Hornish Jr.	Dodge	Penske Racing	333	0	running	67
33	40	00	Michael McDowell	Toyota	Michael Waltrip Racing	332	0	running	64
34	28	21	Bill Elliott	Ford	Wood Brothers Racing	332	0	running	61
35	34	01	Regan Smith	Chevy	Dale Earnhardt, Inc.	331	0	running	58
36	12	1	Martin Truex Jr.	Chevy	Dale Earnhardt, Inc.	330	2	engine	60
37	43	78	Joe Nemechek	Chevy	Furniture Row Racing	330	0	running	52
38	39	70	Jeremy Mayfield	Chevy	Haas CNC Racing	329	0	running	49
39	16	16	Greg Biffle	Ford	Roush Fenway Racing	312	0	running	46
40	37	34	John Andretti	Chevy	Front Row Motorsports	263	0	suspension	43
41	6	44	David Reutimann	Toyota	Michael Waltrip Racing	253	0	engine	40
42	33	96	J.J. Yeley	Toyota	Hall of Fame Racing	173	0	crash	37
43	18	24	Jeff Gordon	Chevy	Hendrick Motorsports	124	0	crash	34

Previous race: 2008 Goody's Cool Orange 500	Sprint Cup Series; 2008 season	Next race: 2008 Subway Fresh Fit 500
