= 2007 Bank of America 500 =

Race details
- Race 31 of 36 in the 2007 NASCAR Nextel Cup Series season
- Layout of Lowe's Motor Speedway
- Date: October 13, 2007
- Official name: Bank of America 500
- Location: Lowe's Motor Speedway, Concord, North Carolina
- Course: Permanent racing facility
- Course length: 1.5 miles (2.414 km)
- Distance: 337 laps, 505.5 mi (813.523 km)
- Scheduled distance: 334 laps, 501 mi (806.281 km)
- Weather: Mild with temperatures approaching 72 °F (22 °C); wind speeds approaching 8 miles per hour (13 km/h)
- Average speed: 125.868 miles per hour (202.565 km/h)

Pole position
Driver	Ryan Newman	Penske Racing
- Time: 28.512

Most laps led
Driver	Jimmie Johnson	Hendrick Motorsports
- Laps: 95

Winner
No. 24	Jeff Gordon	Hendrick Motorsports

Television in the United States
- Network: ABC
- Announcers: Jerry Punch, Rusty Wallace and Andy Petree

The 2007 Bank of America 500 was a NASCAR Nextel Cup Series stock car race that was held on October 13, 2007, at Lowe's Motor Speedway in Concord, North Carolina. The race was the 31st race of the 2007 NASCAR Nextel Cup Series season, and the fifth race of the 2007 Chase for the Nextel Cup. It was the only Saturday night race in the Chase schedule for 2007.

== Background ==
- Ricky Rudd made his return to the No. 88 Yates Racing Ford after missing the previous five weeks due to a separated shoulder suffered in an accident during the Sharp AQUOS 500.

== Qualifying ==
With a lap of 28.512 sec at a speed of 189.394 mph, Ryan Newman won his fifth pole of the 2007 season. Chase points leader Jeff Gordon started 4th right behind Hendrick Motorsports teammate Jimmie Johnson, who started 2nd on the outside pole. Defending winner Kasey Kahne started fifth, and Coke 600 winner Casey Mears started 9th.

Failed to Qualify: No. 44-Dale Jarrett, No. 78-Joe Nemechek, No. 83-Brian Vickers, No. 06-Sam Hornish Jr., No. 08-Carl Long, No. 27-Kirk Shelmerdine

== Race ==
Like the previous Chase races at Dover, Kansas, and most recently at Talladega, a great portion of the 12 Chase drivers would have trouble. Many analysts expected defending champion Jimmie Johnson to walk away with another Charlotte victory, as he had won three consecutive 600's, including two sweeps in 2004 and 2005. He continued with his domination, leading 95 of 337 laps before an unexpected spin on lap 231 took him out of contention. His teammate, points leader Jeff Gordon picked up the lead, trading it with teammate Kyle Busch and Clint Bowyer. After an oil spill by Jeff Green, Gordon and Busch began experiencing fuel pickup problems. Fearing a wreck, owner Rick Hendrick told Kyle to race Gordon clean. Although he attempted a "bump and run" on Gordon, it gave Ryan Newman the opportunity to shoot back into the lead. Newman had victory in his sights until he surprisingly spun out with 3 to go, giving the lead back to Gordon, who had not finished a Lowe's race since 2004. However, Gordon would hold off Bowyer and Busch for his first Lowe's win since 1999.

== Results ==
Top Ten Results: (Note: Chase drivers are in bold italics.)

Pos.	No.	Driver	Car	Team
1.	24	**Jeff Gordon**	Chevrolet	Hendrick Motorsports
2.	07	**Clint Bowyer**	Chevrolet	Richard Childress Racing
3.	5	**Kyle Busch**	Chevrolet	Hendrick Motorsports
4.	31	**Jeff Burton**	Chevrolet	Richard Childress Racing
5.	99	**Carl Edwards**	Ford	Roush Fenway Racing
6.	22	Dave Blaney	Toyota	Bill Davis Racing
7.	20	**Tony Stewart**	Chevrolet	Joe Gibbs Racing
8.	9	Kasey Kahne	Dodge	Gillett Evernham Motorsports
9.	40	David Stremme	Dodge	Chip Ganassi Racing
10.	55	Michael Waltrip	Toyota	Michael Waltrip Racing

Previous race: 2007 UAW-Ford 500	Nextel Cup Series; 2007 season	Next race: 2007 Subway 500
