= 2007 Sharpie 500 =

Race details
- Race 24 of 36 in the 2007 NASCAR Nextel Cup Series season
- The 2007 Sharpie 500 program cover, with artwork by former NASCAR artist Sam Bass. The painting is called "Concrete Clash!"
- Date: August 25, 2007
- Official name: Sharpie 500
- Location: Bristol Motor Speedway, Bristol, Tennessee
- Course: Permanent racing facility
- Course length: 0.533 miles (0.857 km)
- Distance: 500 laps, 266.5 mi (428.89 km)
- Weather: Temperatures reaching as low as 69.1 °F (20.6 °C); winds speeds reaching up to 8 miles per hour (13 km/h)
- Average speed: 89.006 miles per hour (143.241 km/h)

Pole position
Driver	Kasey Kahne	Gillett Evernham Motorsports
- Time: 16.016

Most laps led
Driver	Kasey Kahne	Gillett Evernham Motorsports
- Laps: 305

Winner
No. 99	Carl Edwards	Roush Fenway Racing

Television in the United States
- Network: ESPN
- Announcers: Jerry Punch, Andy Petree and Rusty Wallace

The 2007 Sharpie 500, the 24th race of the 2007 NASCAR Nextel Cup season was run on the newly repaved and reconfigured .533 mile Bristol Motor Speedway in Bristol, Tennessee on Saturday night, August 25, 2007.

This race was the tenth to use NASCAR's Car of Tomorrow, as Kyle Busch won the inaugural event with this car, the Food City 500 on March 25 this year. But that race was on 36-degree high banked turns and the old concrete surface. For this race, one of the most popular in NASCAR, the new concrete surface with its new progressive banked turns between 24 and 30 degrees made its NEXTEL Cup debut.

== Pre-Race News ==
- Kenny Wallace, who was the driver of the #78 Furniture Row Racing Chevrolet until after the Watkins Glen race, replaced the injured Kyle Petty in the #45 Petty Enterprises Dodge. Sterling Marlin piloted the #78 car, but did not make the starting lineup.
- Aric Almirola made his Nextel Cup debut in the Dale Earnhardt, Inc. #01 Chevrolet.
- Matt Kenseth clinched a spot in the Chase for the Nextel Cup by taking the green flag.

=== Entry list ===
#	Driver	Team	Make	Sponsor
00	David Reutimann	Michael Waltrip Racing	Toyota	Burger King
1	Martin Truex Jr.	Dale Earnhardt, Inc.	Chevrolet	Bass Pro Shops, Tracker Boats
01	Aric Almirola	Dale Earnhardt, Inc.	Chevrolet	U.S. Army
2	Kurt Busch	Penske Racing	Dodge	Miller Lite
4	Ward Burton	Morgan–McClure Motorsports	Chevrolet	Miccosukee Resort & Gaming, Food City
5	Kyle Busch	Hendrick Motorsports	Chevrolet	Kellogg's, CARQUEST Auto Parts
6	David Ragan	Roush Fenway Racing	Ford	AAA
7	Robby Gordon	Robby Gordon Motorsports	Ford	Camping World
07	Clint Bowyer	Richard Childress Racing	Chevrolet	Jack Daniel's
8	Dale Earnhardt Jr.	Dale Earnhardt, Inc.	Chevrolet	Budweiser
9	Kasey Kahne	Gillett Evernham Motorsports	Dodge	Dodge Dealers, UAW, McDonald's
10	Scott Riggs	Gillett Evernham Motorsports	Dodge	Valvoline, Stanley Tools
11	Denny Hamlin	Joe Gibbs Racing	Chevrolet	FedEx Freight
12	Ryan Newman	Penske Racing	Dodge	Alltel
15	Paul Menard	Dale Earnhardt, Inc.	Chevrolet	Menards, Turtle Wax Ice
16	Greg Biffle	Roush Fenway Racing	Ford	Dish Network
17	Matt Kenseth	Roush Fenway Racing	Ford	DeWalt
18	J.J. Yeley	Joe Gibbs Racing	Chevrolet	Interstate Batteries
19	Elliott Sadler	Gillett Evernham Motorsports	Dodge	Dodge Dealers, UAW
20	Tony Stewart	Joe Gibbs Racing	Chevrolet	The Home Depot
21	Bill Elliott	Wood Brothers Racing	Ford	U.S. Air Force
22	Dave Blaney	Bill Davis Racing	Toyota	Caterpillar
24	Jeff Gordon	Hendrick Motorsports	Chevrolet	DuPont Automotive Finishes
25	Casey Mears	Hendrick Motorsports	Chevrolet	National Guard, GMAC
26	Jamie McMurray	Roush Fenway Racing	Ford	Irwin Industrial Tools
29	Kevin Harvick	Richard Childress Racing	Chevrolet	Shell, Pennzoil Platinum
31	Jeff Burton	Richard Childress Racing	Chevrolet	RCR Chevrolet
34	Stanton Barrett	Front Row Motorsports	Dodge	Kingsport Iron & Metal, Thompson Metal
36	Jeremy Mayfield	Bill Davis Racing	Toyota	360 OTC
37	Kevin Lepage	Front Row Motorsports	Dodge	Long John Silver's
38	David Gilliland	Robert Yates Racing	Ford	M&M's
40	David Stremme	Chip Ganassi Racing	Dodge	Coors Light
41	Reed Sorenson	Chip Ganassi Racing	Dodge	Target
42	Juan Pablo Montoya	Chip Ganassi Racing	Dodge	Texaco, Havoline
43	Bobby Labonte	Petty Enterprises	Dodge	Cheerios, Betty Crocker
44	Dale Jarrett	Michael Waltrip Racing	Toyota	UPS
45	Kenny Wallace	Petty Enterprises	Dodge	Wells Fargo
48	Jimmie Johnson	Hendrick Motorsports	Chevrolet	Lowe's
49	John Andretti	BAM Racing	Dodge	Paralyzed Veterans of America
55	Michael Waltrip	Michael Waltrip Racing	Toyota	NAPA Auto Parts
66	Jeff Green	Haas CNC Racing	Chevrolet	Haas Automation, Best Buy
70	Johnny Sauter	Haas CNC Racing	Chevrolet	Haas Automation
78	Sterling Marlin	Furniture Row Racing	Chevrolet	Furniture Row Racing
83	Brian Vickers	Red Bull Racing Team	Toyota	Red Bull
84	A.J. Allmendinger	Red Bull Racing Team	Toyota	Red Bull
88	Ricky Rudd	Robert Yates Racing	Ford	Snickers
96	Tony Raines	Hall of Fame Racing	Chevrolet	DLP HDTV
99	Carl Edwards	Roush Fenway Racing	Ford	Office Depot

== Qualifying ==
Kasey Kahne won the pole position on the newly rebanked and resurfaced track. This was Kahne's 14th start on the point. Juan Pablo Montoya joined Kahne on the front row; Montoya's second starting position is the best of his NASCAR career so far.

Pos.	#	Driver	Make	Team	Time	Avg. Speed (mph)
1	9	Kasey Kahne	Dodge	Gillett Evernham Motorsports	16.016	119.805
2	42	Juan Pablo Montoya	Dodge	Chip Ganassi Racing	16.064	119.447
3	26	Jamie McMurray	Ford	Roush Fenway Racing	16.103	119.158
4	6	David Ragan	Ford	Roush Fenway Racing	16.105	119.143
5	22	Dave Blaney	Toyota	Bill Davis Racing	16.110	119.106
6	99	Carl Edwards	Ford	Roush Fenway Racing	16.122	119.017
7	12	Ryan Newman	Dodge	Penske Racing	16.122	119.017
8	88	Ricky Rudd	Ford	Robert Yates Racing	16.135	118.922
9	48	Jimmie Johnson	Chevrolet	Hendrick Motorsports	16.159	118.745
10	31	Jeff Burton	Chevrolet	Richard Childress Racing	16.161	118.730
11	10	Scott Riggs	Dodge	Gillett Evernham Motorsports	16.166	118.694
12	17	Matt Kenseth	Ford	Roush Fenway Racing	16.174	118.635
13	29	Kevin Harvick	Chevrolet	Richard Childress Racing	16.182	118.576
14	4	Ward Burton	Chevrolet	Morgan–McClure Motorsports	16.192	118.503
15	07	Clint Bowyer	Chevrolet	Richard Childress Racing	16.217	118.320
16	55	Michael Waltrip	Toyota	Michael Waltrip Racing	16.225	118.262
17	8	Dale Earnhardt Jr.	Chevrolet	Dale Earnhardt, Inc.	16.235	118.189
18	24	Jeff Gordon	Chevrolet	Hendrick Motorsports	16.237	118.175
19	2	Kurt Busch	Dodge	Penske Racing	16.247	118.102
20	5	Kyle Busch	Chevrolet	Hendrick Motorsports	16.251	118.073
21	19	Elliott Sadler	Dodge	Gillett Evernham Motorsports	16.254	118.051
22	43	Bobby Labonte	Dodge	Petty Enterprises	16.266	117.964
23	20	Tony Stewart	Chevrolet	Joe Gibbs Racing	16.283	117.841
24	7	Robby Gordon	Ford	Robby Gordon Motorsports	16.294	117.761
25	1	Martin Truex Jr.	Chevrolet	Dale Earnhardt, Inc.	16.306	117.674
26	21	Bill Elliott	Ford	Wood Brothers Racing	16.315	117.610
27	38	David Gilliland	Ford	Robert Yates Racing	16.318	117.588
28	49	John Andretti	Dodge	BAM Racing	16.323	117.552
29	41	Reed Sorenson	Dodge	Chip Ganassi Racing	16.350	117.358
30	25	Casey Mears	Chevrolet	Hendrick Motorsports	16.353	117.336
31	36	Jeremy Mayfield	Toyota	Bill Davis Racing	16.355	117.322
32	45	Kenny Wallace	Dodge	Petty Enterprises	16.371	117.207
33	44	Dale Jarrett	Toyota	Michael Waltrip Racing	16.372	117.200
34	16	Greg Biffle	Ford	Roush Fenway Racing	16.389	117.079
35	01	Aric Almirola	Chevrolet	Dale Earnhardt, Inc.	16.402	116.986
36	40	David Stremme	Dodge	Chip Ganassi Racing	16.439	116.722
37	11	Denny Hamlin	Chevrolet	Joe Gibbs Racing	16.445	116.680
38	70	Johnny Sauter	Chevrolet	Haas CNC Racing	16.453	116.623
39	66	Jeff Green	Chevrolet	Haas CNC Racing	16.469	116.510
40	18	J.J. Yeley	Chevrolet	Joe Gibbs Racing	16.510	116.220
41	15	Paul Menard	Chevrolet	Dale Earnhardt, Inc.	16.539	116.017
42	96	Tony Raines	Chevrolet	Hall of Fame Racing	16.544	115.982
43	84	A.J. Allmendinger	Toyota	Red Bull Racing Team	16.375	117.179
Failed to qualify
44	00	David Reutimann	Toyota	Michael Waltrip Racing	16.499	116.298
45	78	Sterling Marlin	Chevrolet	Furniture Row Racing	16.509	116.228
46	83	Brian Vickers	Toyota	Red Bull Racing Team	16.535	116.045
47	37	Kevin Lepage	Dodge	Front Row Motorsports	16.545	115.975
48	34	Stanton Barrett	Dodge	Front Row Motorsports	16.685	115.001

Failed to qualify: David Reutimann (#00), Sterling Marlin (#78), Brian Vickers (#83), Kevin Lepage (#37) and Stanton Barrett (#34).

== Race ==
Carl Edwards won the Sharpie 500 for his second win of 2007 and the sixth of his career. Together, he and second-place finisher Kasey Kahne led 487 of the race's 500 laps. Kahne alone led 305 of them, more than in any other race in his career.

The rest of the Top 5 finishers were Clint Bowyer, Tony Stewart, and Dale Earnhardt Jr.

Denny Hamlin suffered an engine failure and did not finish. It was the first such occurrence in 53 races.

Owing largely to the new, wider racing surface, there were only nine cautions at a track which typically sees 15 or more in a 500-lap Cup race. The first of those did not come until lap 127.

Jeff Gordon left with a 359-point lead over Stewart on top of the championship standings. Kurt Busch retained a 158-point lead over Earnhardt Jr. for the 12th and final position in the Chase. Gordon, Hamlin, Edwards, Matt Kenseth, and Stewart have assured themselves of participation in the NASCAR "playoff."

== Race results ==
Fin	St	#	Driver	Make	Team	Sponsor	Laps	Led	Status	Pts	Winnings
1	6	99	Carl Edwards	Ford	Roush Fenway Racing	Office Depot	500	182	running	190	$297,050
2	1	9	Kasey Kahne	Dodge	Gillett Evernham Motorsports	McDonalds, Dodge Dealers	500	305	running	180	$265,541
3	15	07	Clint Bowyer	Chevrolet	Richard Childress Racing	Jack Daniel's	500	0	running	165	$180,125
4	23	20	Tony Stewart	Chevrolet	Joe Gibbs Racing	The Home Depot	500	0	running	160	$178,386
5	17	8	Dale Earnhardt Jr.	Chevrolet	Dale Earnhardt, Inc.	Budweiser	500	1	running	160	$164,008
6	19	2	Kurt Busch	Dodge	Penske Racing	Miller Lite	500	2	running	155	$145,608
7	7	12	Ryan Newman	Dodge	Penske Racing	Alltel	500	2	running	151	$139,775
8	22	43	Bobby Labonte	Dodge	Petty Enterprises	Cheerios, Betty Crocker	500	0	running	142	$144,238
9	20	5	Kyle Busch	Chevrolet	Hendrick Motorsports	Kellogg's, CARQUEST Auto Parts	500	3	running	143	$116,875
10	34	16	Greg Biffle	Ford	Roush Fenway Racing	Dish Network	500	0	running	134	$120,300
11	25	1	Martin Truex Jr.	Chevrolet	Dale Earnhardt, Inc.	Bass Pro Shops, Tracker Boats	500	0	running	130	$125,695
12	10	31	Jeff Burton	Chevrolet	Richard Childress Racing	RCR Chevrolet	500	0	running	127	$134,641
13	40	18	J.J. Yeley	Chevrolet	Joe Gibbs Racing	Interstate Batteries	500	0	running	124	$131,758
14	36	40	David Stremme	Dodge	Chip Ganassi Racing	Coors Light	500	0	running	121	$97,700
15	29	41	Reed Sorenson	Dodge	Chip Ganassi Racing	Target	500	0	running	118	$123,558
16	13	29	Kevin Harvick	Chevrolet	Richard Childress Racing	Shell, Pennzoil Platinum	500	0	running	115	$140,561
17	2	42	Juan Pablo Montoya	Dodge	Chip Ganassi Racing	Texaco, Havoline	500	0	running	112	$131,050
18	11	10	Scott Riggs	Dodge	Gillett Evernham Motorsports	Valvoline, Stanley Tools	500	0	running	109	$102,300
19	18	24	Jeff Gordon	Chevrolet	Hendrick Motorsports	DuPont Automotive Finishes	500	2	running	111	$137,111
20	24	7	Robby Gordon	Ford	Robby Gordon Motorsports	Camping World	500	3	running	108	$95,975
21	9	48	Jimmie Johnson	Chevrolet	Hendrick Motorsports	Lowe's	499	0	running	100	$142,911
22	30	25	Casey Mears	Chevrolet	Hendrick Motorsports	National Guard, GMAC	498	0	running	97	$106,425
23	16	55	Michael Waltrip	Toyota	Michael Waltrip Racing	NAPA Auto Parts	498	0	running	94	$104,958
24	41	15	Paul Menard	Chevrolet	Dale Earnhardt, Inc.	Menards, Turtle Wax Ice	498	0	running	91	$90,675
25	26	21	Bill Elliott	Ford	Wood Brothers Racing	U.S. Air Force	498	0	running	88	$110,514
26	3	26	Jamie McMurray	Ford	Roush Fenway Racing	Irwin Industrial Tools	498	0	running	85	$97,525
27	39	66	Jeff Green	Chevrolet	Haas CNC Racing	Haas Automation, Best Buy	498	0	running	82	$110,563
28	42	96	Tony Raines	Chevrolet	Hall of Fame Racing	DLP HDTV	498	0	running	79	$96,145
29	21	19	Elliott Sadler	Dodge	Gillett Evernham Motorsports	Dodge Dealers, UAW	497	0	running	76	$106,030
30	27	38	David Gilliland	Ford	Robert Yates Racing	M&M's	497	0	running	73	$114,789
31	5	22	Dave Blaney	Toyota	Bill Davis Racing	Caterpillar	496	0	running	70	$104,123
32	32	45	Kenny Wallace	Dodge	Petty Enterprises	Wells Fargo	496	0	running	67	$93,902
33	14	4	Ward Burton	Chevrolet	Morgan–McClure Motorsports	Miccosukee Resort & Gaming, Food City	494	0	running	64	$85,495
34	33	44	Dale Jarrett	Toyota	Michael Waltrip Racing	UPS	494	0	running	61	$84,135
35	43	84	A.J. Allmendinger	Toyota	Red Bull Racing Team	Red Bull	491	0	running	58	$84,000
36	35	01	Aric Almirola	Chevrolet	Dale Earnhardt, Inc.	U.S. Army	485	0	running	55	$91,890
37	31	36	Jeremy Mayfield	Toyota	Bill Davis Racing	360 OTC	481	0	running	52	$83,755
38	8	88	Ricky Rudd	Ford	Robert Yates Racing	Snickers	478	0	crash	49	$114,678
39	12	17	Matt Kenseth	Ford	Roush Fenway Racing	DeWalt	452	0	crash	46	$131,176
40	28	49	John Andretti	Dodge	BAM Racing	Paralyzed Veterans of America	416	0	electrical	43	$83,425
41	4	6	David Ragan	Ford	Roush Fenway Racing	AAA	414	0	crash	40	$119,100
42	38	70	Johnny Sauter	Chevrolet	Haas CNC Racing	Haas Automation	280	0	running	37	$83,155
43	37	11	Denny Hamlin	Chevrolet	Joe Gibbs Racing	FedEx Freight	209	0	engine	34	$102,268
Failed to qualify
44		00	David Reutimann	Toyota	Michael Waltrip Racing	Burger King					
45		78	Sterling Marlin	Chevrolet	Furniture Row Racing	Furniture Row Racing					
46		83	Brian Vickers	Toyota	Red Bull Racing Team	Red Bull					
47		37	Kevin Lepage	Dodge	Front Row Motorsports	Long John Silver's					
48		34	Stanton Barrett	Dodge	Front Row Motorsports	Kingsport Iron & Metal, Thompson Metal					

Previous race: 2007 3M Performance 400	Nextel Cup Series; 2007 season	Next race: 2007 Sharp AQUOS 500
