= 2008 Subway Fresh Fit 500 =

Race details
- Race 8 of 36 in the 2008 NASCAR Sprint Cup Series
- 2008 Subway Fresh Fit 500 program cover
- Date: April 12, 2008
- Location: Phoenix International Raceway in Avondale, Arizona
- Course: Permanent racing facility
- Course length: 1 miles (1.6 km)
- Distance: 312 laps, 312 mi (502.115 km)
- Weather: Temperatures as low as 57 °F (14 °C); wind speeds up to 14 miles per hour (23 km/h)
- Average speed: 103.292 miles per hour (166.232 km/h)

Pole position
Driver	Ryan Newman	Penske Racing
- Time: 26.975

Most laps led
Driver	Jimmie Johnson	Hendrick Motorsports
- Laps: 120

Winner
No. 48	Jimmie Johnson	Hendrick Motorsports

Television in the United States
- Network: Fox
- Announcers: Mike Joy, Darrell Waltrip and Larry McReynolds

The 2008 Subway Fresh Fit 500 was the eighth race for the NASCAR Sprint Cup season and ran on Saturday, April 12 at Phoenix International Raceway for 312 laps in Avondale, Arizona. The race was broadcast on television by Fox starting at 8:53 PM US EDT, and broadcast via radio and Sirius Satellite Radio on the Motor Racing Network beginning at 7:45 PM US EDT.

== Pre-Race News ==
- Jeremy Mayfield was dropped as the driver of the Haas CNC Racing #70 Chevrolet and replaced by the former driver of the #70 car they own, Johnny Sauter.

== Qualifying ==
Daytona 500 champion Ryan Newman won the pole position, the 34th of his career. Elliott Sadler started on the outside. Kyle Petty and John Andretti failed to qualify.

=== Full qualifying results ===
RANK	DRIVER	NBR	CAR	TIME	SPEED	
1	Ryan Newman	12	Dodge	26.975	133.457	
2	Elliott Sadler	19	Dodge	26.984	133.412	
3	Carl Edwards	99	Ford	26.991	133.378	
4	Mark Martin	8	Chevrolet	26.993	133.368	
5	Kasey Kahne	9	Dodge	27.006	133.304	
6	Kyle Busch	18	Toyota	27.012	133.274	
7	Jimmie Johnson	48	Chevrolet	27.019	133.240	
8	Jamie McMurray	26	Ford	27.029	133.190	
9	Martin Truex Jr.	1	Chevrolet	27.093	132.876	
10	Scott Riggs	66	Chevrolet	27.094	132.871	
11	Jeff Gordon	24	Chevrolet	27.098	132.851	
12	Tony Stewart	20	Toyota	27.101	132.836	
13	Dale Earnhardt Jr.	88	Chevrolet	27.126	132.714	
14	Paul Menard	15	Chevrolet	27.128	132.704	
15	Juan Pablo Montoya	42	Dodge	27.159	132.553	
16	Denny Hamlin	11	Toyota	27.187	132.416	
17	Kevin Harvick	29	Chevrolet	27.191	132.397	
18	Greg Biffle	16	Ford	27.220	132.256	
19	Dave Blaney	22	Toyota	27.220	132.256	*
20	Reed Sorenson	41	Dodge	27.258	132.071	
21	Dario Franchitti	40	Dodge	27.264	132.042	*
22	J. J. Yeley	96	Toyota	27.279	131.970	
23	David Ragan	6	Ford	27.284	131.945	
24	Clint Bowyer	07	Chevrolet	27.289	131.921	
25	Mike Skinner	84	Toyota	27.296	131.887	*
26	David Reutimann	44	Toyota	27.314	131.801	*
27	Matt Kenseth	17	Ford	27.322	131.762	
28	Michael Waltrip	55	Toyota	27.323	131.757	
29	Michael McDowell	00	Toyota	27.334	131.704	
30	Casey Mears	5	Chevrolet	27.344	131.656	
31	Sam Hornish Jr.	77	Dodge	27.352	131.617	
32	Travis Kvapil	28	Ford	27.354	131.608	
33	Brian Vickers	83	Toyota	27.382	131.473	
34	Bobby Labonte	43	Dodge	27.394	131.416	
35	Robby Gordon	7	Dodge	27.423	131.277	
36	David Gilliland	38	Ford	27.434	131.224	
37	Patrick Carpentier	10	Dodge	27.446	131.167	*
38	Regan Smith	01	Chevrolet	27.459	131.105	
39	Jeff Burton	31	Chevrolet	27.496	130.928	
40	Kurt Busch	2	Dodge	27.496	130.928	
41	Joe Nemechek	78	Chevrolet	27.569	130.581	*
42	Johnny Sauter	70	Chevrolet	27.590	130.482	*
43	Kyle Petty	45	Dodge	27.697	129.978	*
44	Bill Elliott	21	Ford	27.793	129.529	PC
45	John Andretti	34	Chevrolet	27.814	129.431	*

OP: qualified via owners points

PC: qualified as past champion

PR: provisional

QR: via qualifying race

* - had to qualify on time

== The race ==
The outcome of this race was determined largely on fuel mileage strategy. Based on crew chief Chad Knaus' calculations, Jimmie Johnson stayed out late in the race while leaders Dale Earnhardt Jr. and Mark Martin entered their pits. Johnson held on for the win while Clint Bowyer finished second.

Jeff Burton climbed from 39th starting position to a sixth-place finish and retained his lead in points.

== Results ==
POS	ST	#	DRIVER	OWNER	CAR	LAPS	STATUS	LED	PTS
1	2	99	Carl Edwards	Jack Roush	Ford	339	running	123	195
2	5	48	Jimmie Johnson	Rick Hendrick	Chevrolet	339	running	65	175
3	3	18	Kyle Busch	Joe Gibbs	Toyota	339	running	50	170
4	4	12	Ryan Newman	Roger Penske	Dodge	339	running	0	135
5	14	11	Denny Hamlin	Joe Gibbs	Toyota	339	running	0	155
6	35	31	Jeff Burton	Richard Childress	Chevrolet	339	running	0	150
7	24	20	Tony Stewart	Joe Gibbs	Toyota	339	running	0	146
8	31	8	Mark Martin	Dale Earnhardt, Inc.	Chevrolet	339	running	0	142
9	8	17	Matt Kenseth	Jack Roush	Ford	339	running	68	143
10	25	07	Clint Bowyer	Richard Childress	Chevrolet	339	running	0	134
11	21	29	Kevin Harvick	Richard Childress	Chevrolet	338	running	0	130
12	1	88	Dale Earnhardt Jr.	Rick Hendrick	Chevrolet	338	running	31	132
13	7	6	David Ragan	Jack Roush	Ford	338	running	0	124
14	32	26	Jamie McMurray	Jack Roush	Ford	338	running	0	121
15	41	38	David Gilliland	Yates Racing	Ford	338	running	0	118
16	36	83	Brian Vickers	Dietrich Mateschitz	Toyota	338	running	0	115
17	19	15	Paul Menard	Dale Earnhardt, Inc.	Chevrolet	338	running	0	112
18	38	28	Travis Kvapil	Yates Racing	Ford	338	running	0	109
19	11	42	Juan Pablo Montoya	Chip Ganassi	Dodge	337	running	0	106
20	30	43	Bobby Labonte	Petty Enterprises	Dodge	337	running	0	103
21	29	22	Dave Blaney	Bill Davis	Toyota	337	running	0	100
22	22	5	Casey Mears	Rick Hendrick	Chevrolet	337	running	0	97
23	23	2	Kurt Busch	Roger Penske	Dodge	337	running	0	94
24	42	41	Reed Sorenson	Chip Ganassi	Dodge	337	running	0	91
25	10	9	Kasey Kahne	Gillett Evernham Motorsports	Dodge	336	running	0	88
26	26	19	Elliott Sadler	Gillett Evernham Motorsports	Dodge	336	running	0	85
27	13	66	Scott Riggs	Gene Haas	Chevrolet	336	running	0	82
28	27	10	Patrick Carpentier	Gillett Evernham Motorsports	Dodge	335	running	0	79
29	9	84	Mike Skinner	Dietrich Mateschitz	Toyota	334	running	0	76
30	15	7	Robby Gordon	Robby Gordon	Dodge	334	running	0	73
31	20	55	Michael Waltrip	Michael Waltrip	Toyota	333	running	0	70
32	17	77	Sam Hornish Jr.	Roger Penske	Dodge	333	running	0	67
33	40	00	Michael McDowell	Michael Waltrip	Toyota	332	running	0	64
34	28	21	Bill Elliott	Wood Brothers	Ford	332	running	0	61
35	34	01	Regan Smith	Dale Earnhardt, Inc.	Chevrolet	331	running	0	58
36	12	1	Martin Truex Jr.	Dale Earnhardt, Inc.	Chevrolet	330	engine	2	60
37	43	78	Joe Nemechek	Barney Visser	Chevrolet	330	running	0	52
38	39	70	Jeremy Mayfield	Gene Haas	Chevrolet	329	running	0	49
39	16	16	Greg Biffle	Jack Roush	Ford	312	running	0	46
40	37	34	John Andretti	Bob Jenkins	Chevrolet	263	suspension	0	43
41	6	44	David Reutimann	Michael Waltrip	Toyota	253	engine	0	40
42	33	96	J. J. Yeley	Jeff Moorad	Toyota	173	crash	0	37
43	18	24	Jeff Gordon	Rick Hendrick	Chevrolet	124	crash	0	34
Failed to qualify
POS	NAME	NBR	OWNER	CAR					
44	Kyle Petty	45	Petty Enterprises	Dodge					
45	John Andretti	34	Bob Jenkins	Chevrolet					

== Yankees / Red Sox coverage ==
Coverage of the pre-race was interrupted when Fox switched over to cover the remaining New York Yankees-Boston Red Sox baseball game which had been delayed due to rain. Fox then switched back to the race as the cars were on the dogleg just after the start. The final two pitches of the game were shown on the cable / satellite channel FX leaving some baseball fans confused. Fox was contractually required to show the entire race on its broadcast network.

NASCAR fans were upset that the network did not show the invocation and national anthem, especially as it was realized that the game was shown on both Fox and FX, in a simulcast, for about 10 minutes. Theoretically, the baseball game could have continued on Fox and the pre-race ceremonies would have been seen on FX, but parent company News Corporation chose not to use that option.

This is the first known occurrence in the history in American sports television that a network missed both the ending of one event (similar to the Heidi Game, except that there was an option to see the remainder of it) and the beginning of another.

On the Speed Channel rebroadcast later that week, the start of the race was shown, in real time, from Brett Bodine pulling the pace car to pit road, and Fox analyst Larry McReynolds waving the green flag, all the way through the entire first lap. It is evident in that replay that the broadcast started on the backstretch as the graphics package did not appear until the cars were on the dogleg.

Previous race: 2008 Samsung 500	Sprint Cup Series; 2008 season	Next race: 2008 Aaron's 499
