= 2008 Aaron's 499 =

Race details
- Race 9 of 36 in the 2008 NASCAR Sprint Cup Series
- Talladega Superspeedway
- Date: April 27, 2008
- Official name: Aaron's 499
- Location: Talladega Superspeedway, Talladega, Alabama
- Course: Permanent racing facility
- Course length: 2.66 miles (4.28 km)
- Distance: 188 laps, 500.08 mi (804.8 km)
- Weather: Temperatures reaching up to 75 °F (24 °C); average wind speeds of 9.9 miles per hour (15.9 km/h)

Pole position
Driver	Joe Nemechek	Furniture Row Racing
- Time: 51.103

Most laps led
Driver	Tony Stewart	Joe Gibbs Racing
- Laps: 61

Winner
No. 18	Kyle Busch	Joe Gibbs Racing

Television in the United States
- Network: Fox
- Announcers: Mike Joy, Darrell Waltrip, and Larry McReynolds

The 2008 Aaron's 499 was the ninth race in the 2008 NASCAR Sprint Cup season. It was held on April 27, 2008, at Talladega Superspeedway in Talladega, Alabama.

== Summary ==
This race was the second race of the season utilizing restrictor plates and the first time that the spring race was raced using the Car of Tomorrow template, with the 2007 UAW-Ford 500 being the first on the superspeedway. The telecast in the USA started at 1 PM US EDT on Fox, with radio coverage on MRN Radio on terrestrial stations and Sirius Satellite Radio starting at 1:15 PM US EDT.

=== Pre-race news ===
- After a fill-in performance two weeks ago by Johnny Sauter, Ken Schrader, who was released from his ride at BAM Racing, will be the new driver of the Haas CNC Racing #70 car starting with this race. BAM Racing has curtailed their schedule as a result of a major sponsorship pullout and the transition to Toyota cars, and may not return until the fall. Schrader helped improve his new team and would start third.

=== Qualifying ===
Furniture Row Racing's #78 car scored the pole thanks to "Front Row" Joe Nemechek, who edged Tony Stewart on the last run of the day.

Failed to qualify: Dave Blaney (#22), John Andretti (#34), J. J. Yeley (#96).

For Yeley, this was the first race he missed as Hall of Fame Racing were outside the Top 35 Owner Points exemption.

=== Race ===
Tony Stewart, in the #20 Toyota of Joe Gibbs Racing, led the first 20 laps before a spin by Matt Kenseth brought out the first caution. After pit stops, the lead would trade hands dozens of times between Stewart, his Gibbs teammate Denny Hamlin, Hendrick Motorsports driver Dale Earnhardt Jr., and seven other racers for nearly 100 laps, before debris brought out the second caution on lap 118.

The lead was again exchanged rapidly, with 16 lead changes in the 23 green-flag laps before Stewart spun in turn 1, without damage. Upon resumption of the race, Hamlin gained and held the lead before lap 161, when Paul Menard spun harmlessly in the tri-oval. A debris caution was declared just two laps after the restart, and Daytona 500 winner Ryan Newman obtained the lead. Newman was passed by Kyle Busch on lap 173, as Kyle joined his Gibbs teammates as race leaders.

On lap 175, contact between Bobby Labonte and Dale Earnhardt Jr. while racing four-wide in Turn 2 resulted in a crash that collected both drivers, Stewart, Martin Truex Jr., Kurt Busch, and Jamie McMurray. McMurray and Earnhardt remained on the lead lap with minimal damage; however, the vehicles of Truex, Stewart, and Busch were damaged beyond repair. Labonte was able to repair his #43 Petty Enterprises Dodge, but spun out in turn 4 shortly after the green flag was waved again, causing another caution with just six laps to go.

In the four lap period between the two crashes involving Bobby Labonte, Michael Waltrip took the lead from Kyle Busch. Busch passed the #55 Toyota of the owner-driver on the final restart, and held off charges from Jeff Gordon, Juan Pablo Montoya, and Hamlin for the remainder of the race.

On the final lap, two separate incidents occurred before the leaders were able to reach the checkered flag. The #00 Michael Waltrip Racing Toyota of Michael McDowell spun in the tri-oval coming to the white flag after contact with teammate David Reutimann and Roush-Fenway Racing driver Greg Biffle in the very back of the field; McDowell did not make contact with other vehicles or the wall, and continued.

Entering turn 1, contact between Earnhardt and McMurray resulted in the #26 Roush-Fenway Ford of McMurray, Ganassi driver David Stremme, and Hendrick teammates Jimmie Johnson and Jeff Gordon all sliding into the outside wall. Johnson's #48 Chevrolet came back down across the racetrack and collected pole-sitter Joe Nemechek, whose #78 Chevrolet blocked half of the track and cast tire smoke across the other half. Regan Smith, Kasey Kahne, Elliott Sadler, Kevin Harvick, Jeff Burton, David Reutimann, Michael Waltrip, and A. J. Allmendinger were all unable to avoid the pile-up, and Stremme wound up slamming into the resulting mess as well.

When the caution was thrown, Kyle Busch was directly in front of Juan Pablo Montoya on the backstretch. Both drivers safely made it around to the finish line, and Busch was declared the winner for the second time in 2008. It was the third victory for Toyota in the NASCAR Sprint Cup Series; their previous two wins had also been scored by Joe Gibbs Racing drivers in 2008. It also marked the first Cup race in which more than two Toyotas finished in the Top 5. It was Montoya's fourth career Top 5 finish in the Sprint Cup Series., and fourth-placed David Ragan scored his third career top-5 finish

=== Notable Statistics ===
Furniture Row Racing scored its first pole position, with "Front Row Joe" Nemechek piloting the #78 Chevrolet around the speedway in just 51.103 seconds, a full tenth of a second faster than runner-up Tony Stewart. The team would not earn another until 2013, when Kurt Busch would be the fastest qualifier at Darlington.

A. J. Allmendinger earned what was then a career-best qualifying position, 4th, in his return to the Red Bull Racing #84 Toyota. After Allmendinger failed to qualify for the first three races of the season, the team had replaced him with Mike Skinner. Allmendinger led one lap during the caution for Tony Stewart's spin, and was caught up in the crash on the final lap.

On the other end of qualifying speed, Bill Davis Racing driver Dave Blaney failed to qualify for the race, making it the only event of the 2008 season that he would not start in the #22 Toyota. It was the first of four DNQ's for Hall of Fame Racing's J. J. Yeley, which would contribute to his departure from the #96 team later in the season.

Travis Kvapil drove his #28 Yates Racing Ford to a career-best sixth-place finish, a result that he would match six years later at the same track, but never surpass. Veteran driver Kyle Petty finished 32nd, two laps down, in his 53rd and final start at Talladega. Former Daytona 500 winner Sterling Marlin drove the #09 Phoenix Racing Chevrolet that would go on to win the event the next year; Marlin's 22nd-place finish would be the best result of the remainder of his Cup Series career.

It was the lone start of the year for David Stremme, who had been the full-time driver of the #40 Chip Ganassi Racing Dodge in 2007. Reigning IndyCar champion Dario Franchitti had replaced him for the 2008 season, but the rookie driver suffered injuries in the previous day's Nationwide Series race, and Stremme was called upon to substitute. Before the last-lap crash that set him back to a 28th-place finish, Stremme led twice for one lap each, the final laps that Stremme would lead under green-flag conditions in the Cup Series.

Another substitute, Ken Schrader, drove the #70 Chevrolet for Haas CNC Racing. Jeremy Mayfield had started out the season behind the wheel of the #70, but had been fired from the team two weeks prior. Schrader's 3rd place starting position was the best qualifying result that the veteran driver achieved since Bristol in March, 2003, and would be the final top-5 starting position of his Cup career. A blown engine relegated him to 42nd-place, preceded only by Reed Sorenson, a fellow victim of engine failure.

Previous race: 2008 Subway Fresh Fit 500	Sprint Cup Series; 2008 season	Next race: 2008 Crown Royal Presents the Dan Lowry 400
