= 2004 Brickyard 400 =

Race details
- Race 21 of 36 in the 2004 NASCAR Nextel Cup Series
- 2004 Brickyard 400 program cover
- Date: August 8, 2004
- Official name: Brickyard 400
- Location: Indianapolis Motor Speedway in Speedway, Indiana
- Course: Permanent racing facility
- Course length: 2.5 miles (4.023 km)
- Distance: 161 laps, 402.5 mi (647.761 km)
- Scheduled distance: 160 laps, 400 mi (643.738 km)
- Weather: Mild with temperatures approaching 77 °F (25 °C); wind speeds up to 8 miles per hour (13 km/h)
- Average speed: 115.037 miles per hour (185.134 km/h)

Pole position
Driver	Casey Mears	Chip Ganassi Racing
- Time: 48.311

Most laps led
Driver	Jeff Gordon	Hendrick Motorsports
- Laps: 124

Winner
No. 24	Jeff Gordon	Hendrick Motorsports

Television in the United States
- Network: NBC
- Announcers: Allen Bestwick, Wally Dallenbach Jr., Benny Parsons

The 2004 Brickyard 400, the 11th running of the event, was a NASCAR Nextel Cup Series race held on August 8, 2004, at Indianapolis Motor Speedway in Speedway, Indiana. Contested at 161 laps – extended from 160 laps due to a green–white–checkered finish – on the 2.5-mile (4.0-kilometre) speedway, it was the 21st race of the 2004 NASCAR Nextel Cup Series season. Jeff Gordon of Hendrick Motorsports won the race.

== Background ==
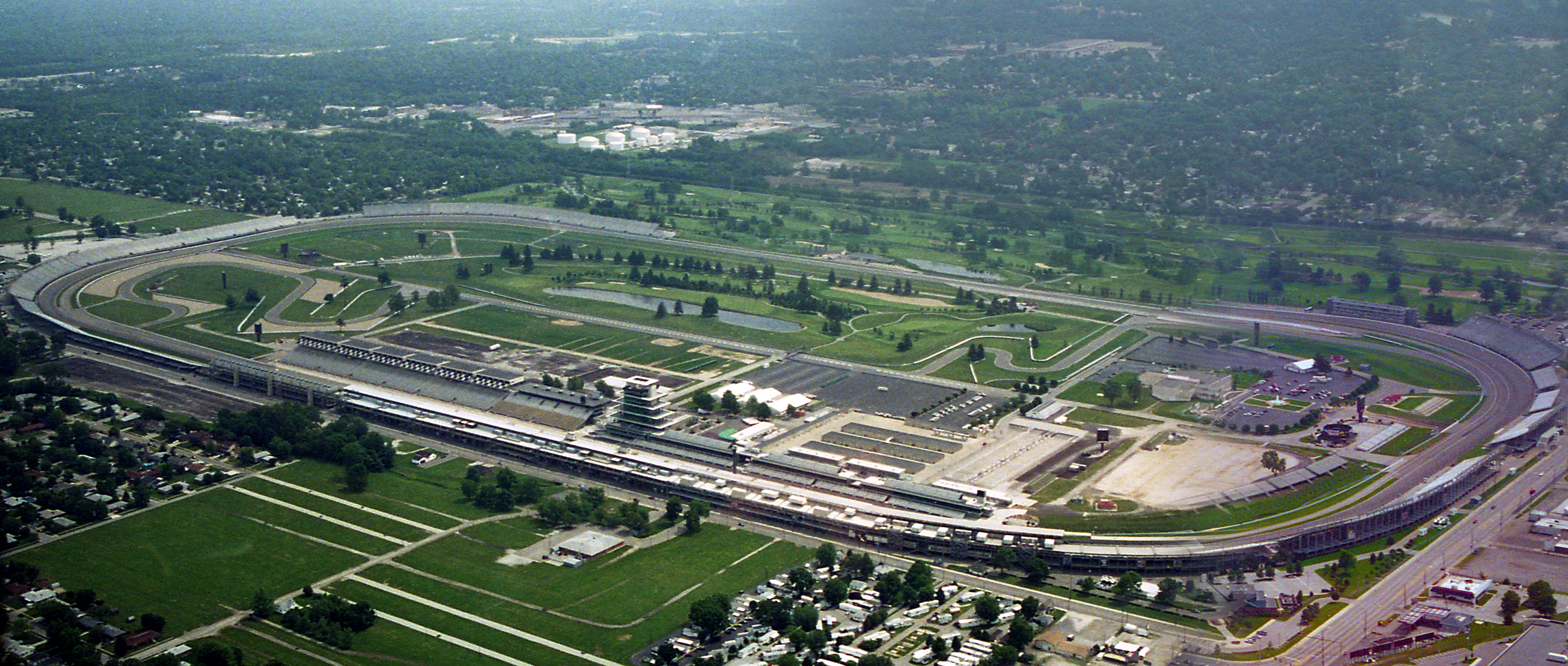
Indianapolis Motor Speedway, the track where the race was held.

The Indianapolis Motor Speedway, located in Speedway, Indiana, (an enclave suburb of Indianapolis) in the United States, is the home of the Indianapolis 500 and the Brickyard 400. It is located on the corner of 16th Street and Georgetown Road, approximately 6 miles (9.7 kilometres) west of Downtown Indianapolis. It is a four-turn rectangular-oval track that is 2.5 miles (4.0 kilometres) long. The track's turns are banked at 9 degrees, while the front stretch, the location of the finish line, has no banking. The back stretch, opposite of the front, also has a zero degree banking. The racetrack has seats for more than 250,000 spectators.

== Summary ==
For the first time in Nextel Cup Series history, the green–white–checkered finish rule caused a race to be extended, in this case for one additional lap. On the extra lap, Casey Mears blew a tire, Ricky Rudd hit the wall, then Mark Martin and Dale Earnhardt Jr. suffered tire failures. Jeff Gordon retained the lead to become the first four-time winner of the Brickyard.

== Race results ==
Pos	No.	Driver	Team	Manufacturer
1	24	Jeff Gordon	Hendrick Motorsports	Chevrolet
2	88	Dale Jarrett	Robert Yates Racing	Ford
3	38	Elliott Sadler	Robert Yates Racing	Ford
4	9	Kasey Kahne (R)	Evernham Motorsports	Dodge
5	20	Tony Stewart	Joe Gibbs Racing	Chevrolet
6	16	Greg Biffle	Roush Racing	Ford
7	42	Jamie McMurray	Chip Ganassi Racing	Dodge
8	29	Kevin Harvick	Richard Childress Racing	Chevrolet
9	91	Bill Elliott	Evernham Motorsports	Dodge
10	97	Kurt Busch	Roush Racing	Ford
11	19	Jeremy Mayfield	Evernham Motorsports	Dodge
12	99	Jeff Burton	Roush Racing	Ford
13	2	Rusty Wallace	Penske-Jasper Racing	Dodge
14	43	Jeff Green	Petty Enterprises	Dodge
15	18	Bobby Labonte	Joe Gibbs Racing	Chevrolet
16	17	Matt Kenseth	Roush Racing	Ford
17	01	Joe Nemechek	MBV Motorsports	Chevrolet
18	49	Ken Schrader	BAM Racing	Dodge
19	4	Jimmy Spencer	Morgan-McClure Motorsports	Chevrolet
20	15	Michael Waltrip	Dale Earnhardt, Inc.	Chevrolet
21	30	Dave Blaney	Richard Childress Racing	Chevrolet
22	31	Robby Gordon	Richard Childress Racing	Chevrolet
23	45	Kyle Petty	Petty Enterprises	Dodge
24	32	Ricky Craven	PPI Motorsports	Chevrolet
25	6	Mark Martin	Roush Racing	Ford
26	41	Casey Mears	Chip Ganassi Racing	Dodge
27	8	Dale Earnhardt Jr.	Dale Earnhardt, Inc.	Chevrolet
28	21	Ricky Rudd	Wood Brothers Racing	Ford
29	25	Brian Vickers	Hendrick Motorsports	Chevrolet
30	23	Tony Raines	Bill Davis Racing	Dodge
31	12	Ryan Newman	Penske-Jasper Racing	Dodge
32	22	Scott Wimmer (R)	Bill Davis Racing	Dodge
33	40	Sterling Marlin	Chip Ganassi Racing	Dodge
34	00	Kenny Wallace	Michael Waltrip Racing	Chevrolet
35	77	Brendan Gaughan (R)	Penske-Jasper Racing	Dodge
36	48	Jimmie Johnson	Hendrick Motorsports	Chevrolet
37	10	Scott Riggs (R)	MBV Motorsports	Chevrolet
38	5	Terry Labonte	Hendrick Motorsports	Chevrolet
39	0	Ward Burton	Haas CNC Racing	Chevrolet
40	98	Derrike Cope	Mach 1 Motorsports	Ford
41	50	Todd Bodine	Arnold Motorsports	Dodge
42	09	Scott Pruett	Phoenix Racing	Dodge
43	60	Jason Leffler	Haas CNC Racing	Chevrolet

Failed to qualify: Kevin Lepage (#51), Hermie Sadler (#02), Morgan Shepherd (#89), Greg Sacks (#13), Andy Hillenburg (#37), Geoffrey Bodine (#34), Kirk Shelmerdine (#72)

=== Race statistics ===
- Time of race: 3:29:56
- Average speed: 115.037 miles per hour (185.134 km/h)
- Pole speed: 186.293 miles per hour (299.810 km/h)
- Cautions: 13 for 47 laps
- Margin of victory: under caution
- Lead changes: 9
- Percent of race run under caution: 29.2%
- Average green flag run: 8.8 laps
