= 2007 USG Sheetrock 400 =

Race details
- Race 19 of 36 in the 2007 NASCAR Nextel Cup Series season
- The 2007 USG Sheetrock 400 program cover.
- Date: July 15, 2007
- Official name: USG Sheetrock 400
- Location: Chicagoland Speedway, Joliet, Illinois
- Course: Permanent racing facility
- Course length: 1.5 miles (2.414 km)
- Distance: 267 laps, 400.5 mi (644.542 km)
- Weather: Temperatures reaching up to 80.6 °F (27.0 °C); wind speeds up to 8.9 miles per hour (14.3 km/h)
- Average speed: 134.258 miles per hour (216.067 km/h)
- Attendance: 80,000

Pole position
Driver	Casey Mears	Hendrick Motorsports
- Time: 29.580

Most laps led
Driver	Tony Stewart	Joe Gibbs Racing
- Laps: 108

Winner
No. 20	Tony Stewart	Joe Gibbs Racing

Television in the United States
- Network: TNT
- Announcers: Bill Weber, Wally Dallenbach Jr. and Kyle Petty

The 2007 USG Sheetrock 400 was the 19th race of the 2007 NASCAR Nextel Cup Series season. It took place during daytime on July 15, 2007, at Chicagoland Speedway in Joliet, Illinois with the broadcast airing on TNT.

== Background ==
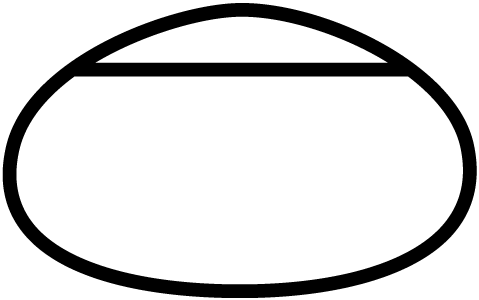
The layout of Chicagoland Speedway, where the race was held.

- (R) denotes rookie driver

Entry list
#	Driver	Team	Make
00	David Reutimann (R)	Michael Waltrip Racing	Toyota
1	Martin Truex Jr.	Dale Earnhardt, Inc.	Chevrolet
01	Mark Martin	Ginn Racing	Chevrolet
2	Kurt Busch	Penske Racing	Dodge
4	Ward Burton	Morgan–McClure Motorsports	Chevrolet
5	Kyle Busch	Hendrick Motorsports	Chevrolet
6	David Ragan (R)	Roush Fenway Racing	Ford
7	Robby Gordon	Robby Gordon Motorsports	Ford
07	Clint Bowyer	Richard Childress Racing	Chevrolet
8	Dale Earnhardt Jr.	Dale Earnhardt, Inc.	Chevrolet
9	Kasey Kahne	Evernham Motorsports	Dodge
10	Scott Riggs	Evernham Motorsports	Dodge
11	Denny Hamlin	Joe Gibbs Racing	Chevrolet
12	Ryan Newman	Penske Racing	Dodge
13	Joe Nemechek	Ginn Racing	Chevrolet
14	Sterling Marlin	Ginn Racing	Chevrolet
15	Paul Menard (R)	Dale Earnhardt, Inc.	Chevrolet
16	Greg Biffle	Roush Fenway Racing	Ford
17	Matt Kenseth	Roush Fenway Racing	Ford
18	J.J. Yeley	Joe Gibbs Racing	Chevrolet
19	Elliott Sadler	Evernham Motorsports	Dodge
20	Tony Stewart	Joe Gibbs Racing	Chevrolet
21	Bill Elliott	Wood Brothers Racing	Ford
22	Dave Blaney	Bill Davis Racing	Toyota
24	Jeff Gordon	Hendrick Motorsports	Chevrolet
25	Casey Mears	Hendrick Motorsports	Chevrolet
26	Jamie McMurray	Roush Fenway Racing	Ford
29	Kevin Harvick	Richard Childress Racing	Chevrolet
31	Jeff Burton	Richard Childress Racing	Chevrolet
36	Jeremy Mayfield	Bill Davis Racing	Toyota
37	Kevin Lepage	Front Row Motorsports	Dodge
38	David Gilliland (R)	Robert Yates Racing	Ford
40	David Stremme	Chip Ganassi Racing	Dodge
41	Reed Sorenson	Chip Ganassi Racing	Dodge
42	Juan Pablo Montoya (R)	Chip Ganassi Racing	Dodge
43	Bobby Labonte	Petty Enterprises	Dodge
44	Dale Jarrett	Michael Waltrip Racing	Toyota
45	John Andretti	Petty Enterprises	Dodge
48	Jimmie Johnson	Hendrick Motorsports	Chevrolet
49	Chad Chaffin	BAM Racing	Dodge
55	Michael Waltrip	Michael Waltrip Racing	Toyota
66	Jeff Green	Haas CNC Racing	Chevrolet
70	Johnny Sauter	Haas CNC Racing	Chevrolet
78	Kenny Wallace	Furniture Row Racing	Chevrolet
83	Brian Vickers	Red Bull Racing Team	Toyota
84	A.J. Allmendinger (R)	Red Bull Racing Team	Toyota
88	Ricky Rudd	Robert Yates Racing	Ford
96	Tony Raines	Hall of Fame Racing	Chevrolet
99	Carl Edwards	Roush Fenway Racing	Ford

== Qualifying ==
Unlike the previous week at Daytona, qualifying was complete for this race. Casey Mears won the pole position with a lap of 182.556 miles per hour. Michael Waltrip qualified for only his fourth race of the season. Chad Chaffin once again filled in at BAM Racing and again qualified for the race.

Qualifying
Pos.	#	Driver	Make	Team	Time	Avg. Speed (mph)
1	25	Casey Mears	Chevrolet	Hendrick Motorsports	29.580	182.556
2	1	Martin Truex Jr.	Chevrolet	Dale Earnhardt, Inc.	29.593	182.476
3	12	Ryan Newman	Dodge	Penske Racing	29.595	182.463
4	01	Mark Martin	Chevrolet	Ginn Racing	29.622	182.297
5	8	Dale Earnhardt Jr.	Chevrolet	Dale Earnhardt, Inc.	29.626	182.272
6	5	Kyle Busch	Chevrolet	Hendrick Motorsports	29.689	181.886
7	07	Clint Bowyer	Chevrolet	Richard Childress Racing	29.727	181.653
8	48	Jimmie Johnson	Chevrolet	Hendrick Motorsports	29.739	181.580
9	45	John Andretti	Dodge	Petty Enterprises	29.764	181.427
10	17	Matt Kenseth	Ford	Roush Fenway Racing	29.767	181.409
11	24	Jeff Gordon	Chevrolet	Hendrick Motorsports	29.780	181.330
12	43	Bobby Labonte	Dodge	Petty Enterprises	29.791	181.263
13	11	Denny Hamlin	Chevrolet	Joe Gibbs Racing	29.797	181.226
14	29	Kevin Harvick	Chevrolet	Richard Childress Racing	29.810	181.147
15	22	Dave Blaney	Toyota	Bill Davis Racing	29.828	181.038
16	15	Paul Menard (R)	Chevrolet	Dale Earnhardt, Inc.	29.841	180.959
17	21	Bill Elliott	Ford	Wood Brothers Racing	29.866	180.808
18	70	Johnny Sauter	Chevrolet	Haas CNC Racing	29.885	180.693
19	20	Tony Stewart	Chevrolet	Joe Gibbs Racing	29.894	180.638
20	36	Jeremy Mayfield	Toyota	Bill Davis Racing	29.895	180.632
21	00	David Reutimann (R)	Toyota	Michael Waltrip Racing	29.900	180.602
22	41	Reed Sorenson	Dodge	Chip Ganassi Racing	29.911	180.536
23	31	Jeff Burton	Chevrolet	Richard Childress Racing	29.923	180.463
24	9	Kasey Kahne	Dodge	Evernham Motorsports	29.947	180.319
25	99	Carl Edwards	Ford	Roush Fenway Racing	29.948	180.313
26	49	Chad Chaffin	Dodge	BAM Racing	29.965	180.210
27	13	Joe Nemechek	Chevrolet	Ginn Racing	29.967	180.198
28	55	Michael Waltrip	Toyota	Michael Waltrip Racing	29.971	180.174
29	66	Jeff Green	Chevrolet	Haas CNC Racing	29.975	180.150
30	42	Juan Pablo Montoya (R)	Dodge	Chip Ganassi Racing	30.015	179.910
31	19	Elliott Sadler	Dodge	Evernham Motorsports	30.021	179.874
32	6	David Ragan (R)	Ford	Roush Fenway Racing	30.025	179.850
33	16	Greg Biffle	Ford	Roush Fenway Racing	30.037	179.778
34	26	Jamie McMurray	Ford	Roush Fenway Racing	30.055	179.671
35	2	Kurt Busch	Dodge	Penske Racing	30.058	179.653
36	18	J.J. Yeley	Chevrolet	Joe Gibbs Racing	30.073	179.563
37	14	Sterling Marlin	Chevrolet	Ginn Racing	30.093	179.444
38	40	David Stremme	Dodge	Chip Ganassi Racing	30.108	179.354
39	7	Robby Gordon	Ford	Robby Gordon Motorsports	30.210	178.749
40	96	Tony Raines	Chevrolet	Hall of Fame Racing	30.213	178.731
41	88	Ricky Rudd	Ford	Robert Yates Racing	30.235	178.601
42	38	David Gilliland (R)	Ford	Robert Yates Racing	30.306	178.183
43	4	Ward Burton	Chevrolet	Morgan–McClure Motorsports	30.070	179.581
Failed to qualify
44	10	Scott Riggs	Dodge	Evernham Motorsports	30.145	179.134
45	83	Brian Vickers	Toyota	Red Bull Racing Team	30.171	178.980
46	44	Dale Jarrett	Toyota	Michael Waltrip Racing	30.207	178.767
47	84	A.J. Allmendinger (R)	Toyota	Red Bull Racing Team	30.228	178.642
48	37	Kevin Lepage	Dodge	Front Row Motorsports	30.277	178.353
49	78	Kenny Wallace	Chevrolet	Furniture Row Racing	30.303	178.200

== Race ==
Tony Stewart won for the first time in 2007 and for the 30th time in his career. He also led the most laps in the competition, 108 out of 267. His margin of victory over 2nd-place Matt Kenseth was 1.727 seconds. The rest of the Top 5 drivers, in order, were Carl Edwards, Kevin Harvick, and Clint Bowyer.

Jimmie Johnson led the second-most laps (82), but encountered tire trouble toward the end and wound up in 37th-place.

Jeff Gordon (9th) extended his points lead over Denny Hamlin (17th) to 303 points. Dale Earnhardt Jr. led Ryan Newman by 39 points for 12th-place and the final spot in the 2007 Chase for the NEXTEL Cup. After this race, seven races remained until the "playoff" field was set.

== Results ==
Fin	St	#	Driver	Make	Team	Laps	Led	Status	Pts	Winnings
1	19	20	Tony Stewart	Chevrolet	Joe Gibbs Racing	267	108	running	195	$342,161
2	10	17	Matt Kenseth	Ford	Roush Fenway Racing	267	1	running	175	$249,866
3	25	99	Carl Edwards	Ford	Roush Fenway Racing	267	0	running	165	$179,625
4	14	29	Kevin Harvick	Chevrolet	Richard Childress Racing	267	54	running	165	$192,986
5	1	25	Casey Mears	Chevrolet	Hendrick Motorsports	267	5	running	160	$157,075
6	35	2	Kurt Busch	Dodge	Penske Racing	267	2	running	155	$150,133
7	23	31	Jeff Burton	Chevrolet	Richard Childress Racing	267	0	running	146	$142,141
8	3	12	Ryan Newman	Dodge	Penske Racing	267	0	running	142	$136,025
9	11	24	Jeff Gordon	Chevrolet	Hendrick Motorsports	267	0	running	138	$144,086
10	7	07	Clint Bowyer	Chevrolet	Richard Childress Racing	267	1	running	139	$111,725
11	33	16	Greg Biffle	Ford	Roush Fenway Racing	267	0	running	130	$111,875
12	22	41	Reed Sorenson	Dodge	Chip Ganassi Racing	267	0	running	127	$123,233
13	6	5	Kyle Busch	Chevrolet	Hendrick Motorsports	267	0	running	124	$108,875
14	4	01	Mark Martin	Chevrolet	Ginn Racing	267	0	running	121	$118,408
15	30	42	Juan Pablo Montoya (R)	Dodge	Chip Ganassi Racing	267	0	running	118	$130,575
16	42	38	David Gilliland (R)	Ford	Robert Yates Racing	267	0	running	115	$124,264
17	13	11	Denny Hamlin	Chevrolet	Joe Gibbs Racing	267	0	running	112	$106,450
18	9	45	John Andretti	Dodge	Petty Enterprises	267	0	running	109	$104,808
19	5	8	Dale Earnhardt Jr.	Chevrolet	Dale Earnhardt, Inc.	267	2	running	111	$131,658
20	12	43	Bobby Labonte	Dodge	Petty Enterprises	266	0	running	103	$129,136
21	41	88	Ricky Rudd	Ford	Robert Yates Racing	266	0	running	100	$119,683
22	18	70	Johnny Sauter	Chevrolet	Haas CNC Racing	266	0	running	97	$87,950
23	37	14	Sterling Marlin	Chevrolet	Ginn Racing	266	0	running	94	$99,858
24	40	96	Tony Raines	Chevrolet	Hall of Fame Racing	265	0	running	91	$95,050
25	32	6	David Ragan (R)	Ford	Roush Fenway Racing	265	0	running	88	$122,525
26	20	36	Jeremy Mayfield	Toyota	Bill Davis Racing	265	0	running	85	$82,025
27	29	66	Jeff Green	Chevrolet	Haas CNC Racing	265	0	running	82	$102,072
28	17	21	Bill Elliott	Ford	Wood Brothers Racing	265	0	running	79	$103,339
29	27	13	Joe Nemechek	Chevrolet	Ginn Racing	264	0	running	76	$83,625
30	28	55	Michael Waltrip	Toyota	Michael Waltrip Racing	264	0	running	73	$80,875
31	26	49	Chad Chaffin	Dodge	BAM Racing	263	0	running	70	$80,175
32	24	9	Kasey Kahne	Dodge	Evernham Motorsports	262	0	running	67	$127,166
33	31	19	Elliott Sadler	Dodge	Evernham Motorsports	260	0	running	64	$101,570
34	38	40	David Stremme	Dodge	Chip Ganassi Racing	257	0	engine	61	$79,575
35	36	18	J.J. Yeley	Chevrolet	Joe Gibbs Racing	243	0	crash	58	$107,258
36	39	7	Robby Gordon	Ford	Robby Gordon Motorsports	225	0	running	55	$79,150
37	8	48	Jimmie Johnson	Chevrolet	Hendrick Motorsports	222	82	crash	57	$132,861
38	34	26	Jamie McMurray	Ford	Roush Fenway Racing	214	0	running	49	$86,700
39	2	1	Martin Truex Jr.	Chevrolet	Dale Earnhardt, Inc.	211	12	engine	51	$104,845
40	15	22	Dave Blaney	Toyota	Bill Davis Racing	199	0	crash	43	$86,280
41	43	4	Ward Burton	Chevrolet	Morgan–McClure Motorsports	197	0	crash	40	$78,080
42	16	15	Paul Menard (R)	Chevrolet	Dale Earnhardt, Inc.	132	0	running	37	$77,910
43	21	00	David Reutimann (R)	Toyota	Michael Waltrip Racing	43	0	engine	34	$77,976
Failed to qualify
44		10	Scott Riggs	Dodge	Evernham Motorsports					
45		83	Brian Vickers	Toyota	Red Bull Racing Team					
46		44	Dale Jarrett	Toyota	Michael Waltrip Racing					
47		84	A.J. Allmendinger (R)	Toyota	Red Bull Racing Team					
48		37	Kevin Lepage	Dodge	Front Row Motorsports					
49		78	Kenny Wallace	Chevrolet	Furniture Row Racing					

== Notes ==
- The command to start the engines was given by former Chicago Bears head coach Lovie Smith.
- This was the final race in the telecast schedule for TNT. Kyle Petty, who was one of the color analysts, returned to the #45 car for the Allstate 400 at the Brickyard.
- On the Friday of the race weekend, NASCAR announced that Robby Gordon had lost 25 driver points and 25 owner points because the camera shell, a part that allows in-car images to be sent to television viewers, was not approved.
- The 2007 race was the last daytime race in Joliet until 2011. It was announced that starting in 2008, the race would be moved to Saturday night as lights would be installed.

Previous race: 2007 Pepsi 400	Nextel Cup Series; 2007 season	Next race: 2007 Allstate 400 at the Brickyard
