= 2007 LifeLock 400 =

Race details
- Race 29 of 36 in the 2007 NASCAR Nextel Cup Series season
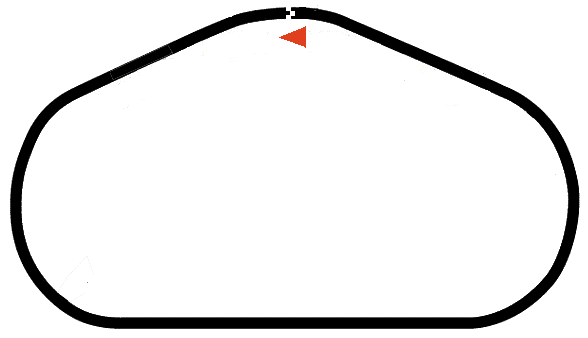
- Layout of Kansas Speedway
- Date: September 30, 2007
- Official name: LifeLock 400
- Location: Kansas Speedway, Kansas City, Kansas
- Course: Permanent racing facility
- Course length: 2.414 km (1.5 miles)
- Distance: 210 laps, 315 mi (506.943 km)
- Scheduled distance: 267 laps, 400.5 mi (644.542 km)
- Weather: Temperatures reaching a maximum of 86 °F (30 °C); wind speeds up to 22 miles per hour (35 km/h)
- Average speed: 104.981 miles per hour (168.951 km/h)

Pole position
Driver	Jimmie Johnson	Hendrick Motorsports
- Time: 30.846

Most laps led
Driver	Kurt Busch	Penske Racing
- Laps: 76

Winner
No. 16	Greg Biffle	Roush Fenway Racing

Television in the United States
- Network: ABC
- Announcers: Jerry Punch, Andy Petree and Rusty Wallace

The 2007 LifeLock 400 was the 29th race in the 2007 NASCAR season and the third race of the ten in the 2007 Chase for the Nextel Cup Championship Series. The event, held at Kansas Speedway in Kansas City, Kansas, was run on September 30, 2007.

The new title sponsor of the race was LifeLock, a company that sells products that are designed to protect consumers from identity theft. It replaces ConAgra Foods, which had sponsored the race since 2003 under the Banquet brand name.

== Qualifying ==
With a lap of 30.846 seconds at a speed of 175.063 mph, Chase driver Jimmie Johnson scored his second consecutive pole. "Rocketman" Ryan Newman was to have been alongside him, missing the pole position by .30 thousandths of a second, but his lap was disallowed after failing post-qualifying inspection. Out of his typical fashion of starting in the back, Matt Kenseth qualified a very uncharacteristic third. Of note, Scott Riggs posted his best starting spot this year in fourth, and all three Michael Waltrip Racing cars made the race. Points leader Jeff Gordon started fifth, Emporia native Clint Bowyer started 11th, and defending winner Tony Stewart started 20th.

Failed to Qualify: A. J. Allmendinger (#84); Brian Vickers (#83); Jon Wood (#47); Ward Burton (#4).

== Happy Hour ==
Continuing with the craziness from Dover, Chase drivers again had trouble. During final practice, polesitter Jimmie Johnson spun and damaged his left front fender. His team will go to a backup car, but they will still be credited for the pole. Tony Stewart, who is already on probation for using an expletive at Indy, had another slip at Kansas. While talking to fellow driver Robby Gordon, an ESPN2 camera crew showed up. Stewart said "What? Get the expletive away from me." Stewart may face a points penalty similar to the one Carl Edwards had after winning Dover.

== Race ==
The race would be dominated by Kurt Busch who led 76 laps. However, Chase drivers immediately began to have trouble. Kyle Busch was tapped from behind by Dale Earnhardt Jr., the man who will replace Busch at Hendrick Motorsports in 2008. Following the incident, Kyle would bring his car into the garage, retire from the race, and leave the track. Unbeknownst to him, his pit crew would repair the car in his absence. Without a driver, the crew would scout Dale Jr. to drive the car and finish the race for Kyle. Jeff Burton, who was leading the points at this race last year, attempted to repair fender damage under red flag conditions, sending him to the tail end of the longest line. Burton's day would only get worse as he had starter trouble. Martin Truex Jr. and Matt Kenseth would be collected in a 15 car pileup. The red flag would wave for a second time due to rain.

The controversy begins after the rain stops and NASCAR attempts to dry the track. At 5 PM CT, ABC switches the broadcast over to local affiliates, and moves the race to ESPN2, which ended a practice in NASCAR in the past five years where race overrun stays on the broadcast network. When the race restarts at 6 PM, with one hour to go before darkness, NASCAR attempts to shorten the race to 225 laps (the track did not have lights before 2011). After numerous cautions following the resumption of racing, NASCAR officials shorten the race again, this time to 210 laps.

Another Chase contender, Tony Stewart, had made a gamble before the previous red flag to coast to the end. However, that would not work as Stewart would come back in for fuel, and was later involved in the aforementioned "Big One". His day would only get worse from there, as he took fender damage on his left front tire. Crew chief Greg Zipadelli made the call to stay out on the racetrack, not wanting to risk track position. The call would not work as Tony's tire went flat and was accidentally punted by Kurt Busch, causing him to spin and collect chase contender Carl Edwards. While the Chasers struggled, 2005 runner-up Greg Biffle was also conserving fuel. The final caution would come out for a blown tire from Juan Pablo Montoya with 3 laps to go.

Darkness meant the race would end under caution (no green-white-checker finish), and ended with the revised distance of 210 laps completed. Controversy reigned in who had won the race. As the cars came around to the checkered flag, Biffle ran out of fuel. Coasting along the flat part of the track, Biffle slowed down, causing the car of Clint Bowyer to slow down. However, Jimmie Johnson did not, passing both Bowyer and Biffle under caution before handing second back to Bowyer. NASCAR declared Biffle the winner, breaking his 28 race losing streak.

NASCAR rules state on the final lap of a race, the car must finish on its own power, and following incidents in recent years (including one where Johnson was docked positions during a 2004 race for being slower than pace car speed during a pit road fake), stated a rule that the car must be at pace car speed (50 MPH) or it loses track position. Biffle was considerably slower than pace car speed, and the finish was protested over the procedure. All protests were denied.

== Results ==
Full Results: (NOTE: Chase drivers are in bold italics.)

Pos.	No.	Driver	Car	Team
1.	#16	Greg Biffle	Ford	Roush Fenway Racing
2.	#07	**Clint Bowyer**	Chevrolet	Richard Childress Racing
3.	#48	**Jimmie Johnson**	Chevrolet	Hendrick Motorsports
4.	#24	**Jeff Gordon**	Chevrolet	Hendrick Motorsports
5.	#25	Casey Mears	Chevrolet	Hendrick Motorsports
6.	#29	**Kevin Harvick**	Chevrolet	Richard Childress Racing
7.	#41	Reed Sorenson	Dodge	Chip Ganassi Racing
8.	#19	Elliott Sadler	Dodge	Gillett Evernham Motorsports
9.	#9	Kasey Kahne	Dodge	Gillett Evernham Motorsports
10.	#8	Dale Earnhardt Jr.	Chevrolet	Dale Earnhardt Incorporated
11.	#2	**Kurt Busch**	Dodge	Penske Racing South
12.	#01	Mark Martin	Chevrolet	Dale Earnhardt Incorporated
13.	#10	Scott Riggs	Dodge	Gillett Evernham Motorsports
14.	#18	J. J. Yeley	Chevrolet	Joe Gibbs Racing
15.	#22	Dave Blaney	Toyota	Bill Davis Racing
16.	#6	David Ragan **(R)**	Ford	Roush Fenway Racing
17.	#40	David Stremme	Dodge	Chip Ganassi Racing
18.	#96	Tony Raines	Chevrolet	Hall of Fame Racing
19.	#7	Robby Gordon	Ford	Robby Gordon Motorsports
20.	#66	Jeff Green	Chevrolet	Haas CNC Racing
21.	#45	Kyle Petty	Dodge	Petty Enterprises
22.	#36	Jeremy Mayfield	Toyota	Bill Davis Racing
23.	#70	Johnny Sauter	Chevrolet	Haas CNC Racing
24.	#26	Jamie McMurray	Ford	Roush Fenway Racing
25.	#78	Joe Nemechek	Chevrolet	Furniture Row Racing
26.	#44	Dale Jarrett	Toyota	Michael Waltrip Racing
27.	#15	Paul Menard **(R)**	Chevrolet	Dale Earnhardt Incorporated
28.	#42	Juan Pablo Montoya **(R)**	Dodge	Chip Ganassi Racing
29.	#11	**Denny Hamlin**	Chevrolet	Joe Gibbs Racing
30.	#55	Michael Waltrip	Toyota	Michael Waltrip Racing
31.	#00	David Reutimann **(R)**	Toyota	Michael Waltrip Racing
32.	#21	Ken Schrader	Ford	Wood Brothers Racing
33.	#49	John Andretti	Dodge	BAM Racing
34.	#38	David Gilliland	Ford	Robert Yates Racing
35.	#17	**Matt Kenseth**	Ford	Roush Fenway Racing
36.	#31	**Jeff Burton**	Chevrolet	Richard Childress Racing
37.	#99	**Carl Edwards**	Ford	Roush Fenway Racing
38.	#1	**Martin Truex Jr.**	Chevrolet	Dale Earnhardt Incorporated
39.	#20	**Tony Stewart**	Chevrolet	Joe Gibbs Racing
40.	#88	Kenny Wallace	Ford	Robert Yates Racing
41.	#5	**Kyle Busch**	Chevrolet	Hendrick Motorsports
42.	#43	Bobby Labonte	Dodge	Petty Enterprises
43.	#12	Ryan Newman	Dodge	Penske Racing South

Previous race: 2007 Dodge Dealers 400	Nextel Cup Series; 2007 season	Next race: 2007 UAW-Ford 500
