= 2007 Sharp AQUOS 500 =

Race details
- Race 25 of 36 in the 2007 NASCAR Nextel Cup Series season
- Track map of the speedway at Auto Club Speedway AKA California Speedway
- Date: September 2, 2007
- Location: Auto Club Speedway, Fontana, California
- Course: Permanent racing facility
- Course length: 3.23 km (2.0 miles)
- Distance: 250 laps, 500 mi (804.672 km)
- Weather: Temperatures up to 107.6 °F (42.0 °C); wind speeds up to 12 miles per hour (19 km/h)
- Average speed: 138.857 miles per hour (223.469 km/h)

Pole position
Driver	Kurt Busch	Penske Racing
- Time: 39.474

Most laps led
Driver	Kyle Busch	Hendrick Motorsports
- Laps: 97

Winner
No. 48	Jimmie Johnson	Hendrick Motorsports

Television in the United States
- Network: ESPN
- Announcers: Jerry Punch, Dale Jarrett and Andy Petree

The 2007 Sharp AQUOS 500 was the 25th race of the 2007 NASCAR Nextel Cup season, and was held on Sunday, September 2, 2007, at California Speedway near Fontana, California, 50 miles east of Los Angeles. After this race, only one more race remained before the field is set for the 2007 Chase for the Nextel Cup, and through the Bristol race, five drivers - Jeff Gordon, Denny Hamlin, Matt Kenseth. Carl Edwards and Tony Stewart - have clinched spots in NASCAR's "playoff series".

This is the second race of the season at California, the 15th since the track was added to the schedule in 1997, and the fourth race to be run here as the replacement for the Southern 500.

The new race sponsor was announced on August 8, 2007, replacing Sony HD. Like its predecessor, Sharp Aquos is a brand of high-definition television set. It was also announced that Stevie Wonder would be the grand marshal, commanding the start of the engines of the 43 cars to start the race.

== Pre-Race ==
- For the third straight race, the #78 Furniture Row Racing Chevrolet had a different driver since the team released Kenny Wallace. This time, Joe Nemechek qualified the car (30th position) after Scott Wimmer and Sterling Marlin had failed the previous two weeks.
- Kyle Petty returned for this race in the Petty Enterprises #45 Dodge after missing two weeks due to his broken hand.
- The entry list for this race consisted of 46 cars, the lowest number for any NEXTEL Cup race this year. Part of the reason is that Front Row Motorsports has suspended operations and closed its #37 team. That team made only three of 24 races during the season and had no continuing sponsorship. (Yum! Brands sponsored select races.)
- Wonder gave the command, as mentioned earlier. Also, Island Records recording artist Melissa Etheridge sang "The USA National Anthem" and two B2 Stealth bombers were in the flyover.
- The air temperature was 107.6 °F or 42.0 °C at the green flag time of 5:15 p.m. Pacific Time. At the time, southern California was in the midst of a heat wave that would last for at least eight days.

== Qualifying ==
Kurt Busch won his first pole of the season, edging out Jimmie Johnson by .001 of a second. It was the second such narrow loss by Johnson, who lost by the same margin to J. J. Yeley at Michigan two weeks earlier.

Failed to Qualify: #10-Scott Riggs; #4-Ward Burton; #44-Dale Jarrett

== Race ==
Kyle Busch dominated the race, leading 97 of 250 laps to take home the 10 bonus points for leading the most laps. However, it was his teammate, Jimmie Johnson (from nearby El Cajon, California) who took charge and held off a charging Carl Edwards for his series high fifth victory of the year and an automatic spot in the 2007 Chase for the NEXTEL Cup. Also clinching spots were Kyle Busch and Jeff Burton. Martin Truex Jr. and Clint Bowyer will clinch spots by starting the next race, the Chevy Rock and Roll 400. Ricky Rudd was injured in an accident during the race, separating his shoulder, and missed several races with Mike and Kenny Wallace subbing for him.

== Results ==
Top ten results:

Pos.	No.	Driver	Car	Team
1.	#48	Jimmie Johnson	Chevrolet	Hendrick Motorsports
2.	#99	Carl Edwards	Ford	Roush Fenway Racing
3.	#5	Kyle Busch	Chevrolet	Hendrick Motorsports
4.	#31	Jeff Burton	Chevrolet	Richard Childress Racing
5.	#8	Dale Earnhardt Jr.	Chevrolet	Dale Earnhardt Incorporated
6.	#1	Martin Truex Jr.	Chevrolet	Dale Earnhardt Incorporated
7.	#17	Matt Kenseth	Ford	Roush Fenway Racing
8.	#83	Brian Vickers	Toyota	Team Red Bull
9.	#2	Kurt Busch	Dodge	Penske Racing
10.	#9	Kasey Kahne	Dodge	Gillett Evernham Motorsports

== Notes and references ==
Previous race: 2007 Sharpie 500	Nextel Cup Series; 2007 season	Next race: 2007 Chevy Rock & Roll 400
