= 2007 Centurion Boats at the Glen =

Race details
- Race 22 of 36 in the 2007 NASCAR Nextel Cup Series season
- Watkins Glen grand prix race course
- Date: August 12, 2007
- Official name: Centurion Boats at the Glen
- Location: Watkins Glen International in Watkins Glen, New York
- Course: Permanent racing facility
- Course length: 2.45 miles (3.942 km)
- Distance: 90 laps, 220.5 mi (354.86 km)
- Weather: Temperatures reaching up to 86 °F (30 °C); wind speeds up to 8 miles per hour (13 km/h)
- Average speed: 77.535 miles per hour (124.780 km/h)

Pole position
Driver	Jeff Gordon	Hendrick Motorsports
- Time: 2007 Owner's Points

Most laps led
Driver	Jeff Gordon	Hendrick Motorsports
- Laps: 51

Winner
No. 20	Tony Stewart	Joe Gibbs Racing

Television in the United States
- Network: ESPN
- Announcers: Jerry Punch, Andy Petree and Rusty Wallace

The 2007 Centurion Boats at the Glen was the twenty-second race of the 2007 NASCAR Nextel Cup Season, and was run on Sunday, August 12, 2007 at Watkins Glen Raceway in New York. This road course race was one of only two races scheduled in NASCAR's premier series not on oval-shaped tracks, and was the ninth race that featured NASCAR's Car of Tomorrow, a safety-driven automobile that is being used in the 2008 season full-time.

== Qualifying ==
The scheduled qualifying was cancelled due to rain, and the field was set by NASCAR's rulebook, meaning points leader Jeff Gordon was on the pole.

Failed to make race as qualifying was cancelled due to rain: Marcos Ambrose (#77)*, A. J. Allmendinger (#84), Ward Burton (#4), Klaus Graf (#49), Boris Said (#60)*, Brian Simo (#37).

* - It was announced on August 11 that Said would replace Bill Elliott in the Wood Brothers/JTG Racing #21 Ford for the race. By rule, that car started in the 43rd position. Said was upset that he wasn't able to qualify in his car, so Elliott offered him his car.

*- Also Marcos Ambrose was given RGM's #77 car for the weekend as a peace offering because Robby Gordon intentionally turned Marcos Ambrose away from a NBS win at Montreal the previous week. Robby was fined $50,000 and suspended from the NSCS Pocono race as a result.

== Race ==
Tony Stewart won the race, his third in the last four Cup events.

The final 18 laps were extraordinary. It began with a multi-car incident in Turn 1 with, among others, Kevin Harvick, Juan Pablo Montoya, and Jeff Burton. Harvick and Montoya then left their cars and traded insults and shoves. Even though it was clear that Montoya did not cause the accident Kevin Harvick said "I'd rather kick his (expletive)" when interviewed. Harvick was put on temporary probation for the rest of the year because his part in the feud violated a warning NASCAR gave him after Kevin caused a pile-up at Montreal the previous week and ended up winning.

Due to an extensive amount of cleanup needed, the race was held under a red flag for nearly 30 minutes. During that time, a spectator attempted to get Matt Kenseth's autograph. Kenseth declined and the fan was later arrested. Police have identified the fan as Brett Hibbert of Kenmore, New York.

With two laps to go, Jeff Gordon, who had led 51 of the first 88 laps, spun out, also in Turn 1. Stewart inherited the lead. On the last lap, Carl Edwards, who was battling Stewart for the win, overdrove the car into turn 10, the 2nd to final turn on the course, through the gravel trap, and wound up finishing eighth, Stewart coasted to the win, his fourth at the track; that tied Gordon for the most in series history. Denny Hamlin finished second, making it a 1-2 finish for Joe Gibbs Racing.

The switch of Boris Said for Bill Elliott worked, as Said finished 14th, which was high enough for the Wood Brothers/JTG Racing's famous #21 to vault past Bill Davis Racing #22 for 35th in the season-long owners' standings and guarantee Elliott a place in the following week's 3M Performance 400.

In the points, Gordon led second-place Denny Hamlin by 343 points. Kurt Busch remained 12th with a 90-point cushion for the last Chase position. Ryan Newman was now 13th, and Dale Earnhardt Jr. was 14th.

== Results ==
Top 10 results:

Pos.	No.	Driver	Car	Team
1	20	Tony Stewart	Chevrolet	Joe Gibbs Racing
2	11	Denny Hamlin	Chevrolet	Joe Gibbs Racing
3	48	Jimmie Johnson	Chevrolet	Hendrick Motorsports
4	96	Ron Fellows	Chevrolet	Hall of Fame Racing
5	7	Robby Gordon	Ford	Robby Gordon Motorsports
6	1	Martin Truex Jr.	Chevrolet	Dale Earnhardt, Inc.
7	5	Kyle Busch	Chevrolet	Hendrick Motorsports
8	99	Carl Edwards	Ford	Roush Fenway Racing
9	24	Jeff Gordon	Chevrolet	Hendrick Motorsports
10	16	Greg Biffle	Ford	Roush Fenway Racing

Previous race: 2007 Pennsylvania 500	Nextel Cup Series; 2007 season	Next race: 2007 3M Performance 400
