= 2007 3M Performance 400 =

Race details
- Race 23 of 36 in the 2007 NASCAR Nextel Cup Series season
- 2007 3M Performance 400 program cover
- Date: August 21, 2007
- Official name: 3M Performance 400
- Location: Michigan International Speedway, Brooklyn, Michigan
- Course: Permanent racing facility
- Course length: 3.218 km (2.0 miles)
- Distance: 203 laps, 406 mi (653.393 km)
- Scheduled distance: 200 laps, 400 mi (643.737 km)
- Weather: Hot with temperatures reaching up to 87.1 °F (30.6 °C); wind speeds up to 11.1 miles per hour (17.9 km/h)
- Average speed: 117.012 miles per hour (188.313 km/h)

Pole position
Driver	Jeff Gordon	Hendrick Motorsports
- Time: 38.090

Most laps led
Driver	Kurt Busch	Penske Racing
- Laps: 92

Winner
No. 2	Kurt Busch	Penske Racing

Television in the United States
- Network: ESPN2
- Announcers: Jerry Punch, Andy Petree and Rusty Wallace

The 2007 3M Performance 400 was the 23rd race in the 2007 NASCAR season was scheduled to be held on Sunday, August 19, 2007 at Michigan International Speedway in Brooklyn, Michigan. However, a day-long rain postponed the race until August 20, but another rainstorm postponed the race until the following day.

== Pre-race News ==
- Kenny Wallace was released from the No. 78 Furniture Row Racing Chevy team. Wimmer replaced him, but failed to qualify in a one-race deal.
- Due to a hand injury to his hand suffered in a fit of anger when he punched out a wall in his hauler at the previous weekend's race in Watkins Glen, Kyle Petty was replaced in the No. 45 as Chad McCumbee for that race only.

== Practice and qualifying ==
Kasey Kahne, with a speed of 187.544 mph, was fastest in practice. He was followed by Jimmie Johnson, David Stremme, Kyle Busch, and Matt Kenseth who rounded out the top five.

An early blow came in the first practice when Jeff Burton lost an engine minutes into the warmups. As a result, the No. 31 Chevrolet started in the back of the field regardless of where he qualified.

In qualifying itself, newly formed Gillett Evernham Motorsports looked to turn its season around with an all GEM front row. However, those efforts were thwarted by that of Greg Biffle, who held the pole until Jeff Gordon, the final driver to qualify, took his 62nd career Bud Pole award. Of note, Michael Waltrip Racing placed two of its cars in the top 15 although Dale Jarrett failed to make the show.

Did not qualify: No. 36 – Jeremy Mayfield, No. 44 – Dale Jarrett, No. 78 – Scott Wimmer, No. 37 – Kevin Lepage, No. 84 – A. J. Allmendinger

== Race ==
The two-day postponement because of weather was the first since the 1997 DieHard 500 at Talladega. In that case, the race was run on the day before Mothers' Day, which was May 10. However, this race would be started on August 21 at 10:00 a.m. With no rain scheduled until the afternoon, the race ran its full distance although NASCAR waved a competition caution for the drivers to adjust their cars.

Kurt Busch, driving a Dodge Charger, held off the Chevrolet Monte Carlos of Martin Truex Jr. and Jimmie Johnson, under a green-white-checkered finish, to take his second win in three races. As with his earlier victory at Pocono, Busch led the most laps, 96 out of 203.

Gordon and Denny Hamlin, the top two drivers in the Cup standings, clinched places in the Chase for the Nextel Cup. Busch remained in 12th place, but extended his lead over 13th place Dale Earnhardt Jr. to 163 points.

Also, Bill Davis Racing took back 35th place in the owners' standings for its No. 22 team on the strength of a sixth-place finish from Dave Blaney. This meant that BDR was guaranteed a starting spot for the next race, the Sharpie 500. Wood Brothers/JTG Racing (#21) fell back to 36th. It was the third change for 35th, between these teams, since late July.

For the first time in the brief history of Toyota in the Cup Series, two of its drivers finished in the top 10 in the same race: Blaney and Brian Vickers (8th).

The race telecast, scheduled for ESPN, was relocated to ESPN2.

=== Results ===
POS	ST	#	DRIVER	SPONSOR / OWNER	CAR	LAPS	MONEY	STATUS	LED	PTS
1	15	2	Kurt Busch	Miller Lite (Roger Penske)	Dodge	203	190108	running	92	195
2	14	1	Martin Truex, Jr.	Bass Pro Shops / Tracker Boats / 57 Chevy (Dale Earnhardt, Inc.)	Chevrolet	203	151245	running	0	170
3	7	48	Jimmie Johnson	Lowe's / 57 Chevy (Rick Hendrick)	Chevrolet	203	175761	running	15	170
4	21	17	Matt Kenseth	DeWalt (Jack Roush)	Ford	203	152491	running	31	165
5	8	11	Denny Hamlin	FedEx Kinko's (Joe Gibbs)	Chevrolet	203	109650	running	0	155
6	17	22	Dave Blaney	Caterpillar (Bill Davis)	Toyota	203	114433	running	0	150
7	13	99	Carl Edwards	Office Depot (Jack Roush)	Ford	203	93150	running	0	146
8	18	83	Brian Vickers	Red Bull (Dietrich Mateschitz)	Toyota	203	82925	running	11	147
9	4	43	Bobby Labonte	Cheerios / Betty Crocker (Petty Enterprises)	Dodge	203	120036	running	0	138
10	35	20	Tony Stewart	Home Depot (Joe Gibbs)	Chevrolet	203	135411	running	0	134
11	29	25	Casey Mears	National Guard / GMAC / 57 Chevy (Rick Hendrick)	Chevrolet	203	94625	running	0	130
12	39	8	Dale Earnhardt, Jr.	Budweiser / 57 Chevy (Dale Earnhardt, Inc.)	Chevrolet	203	121508	running	1	132
13	6	5	Kyle Busch	Kellogg's / Carquest (Rick Hendrick)	Chevrolet	203	94350	running	0	124
14	19	31	Jeff Burton	AT&T Mobility (Richard Childress)	Chevrolet	203	114891	running	0	121
15	28	29	Kevin Harvick	Shell / Pennzoil (Richard Childress)	Chevrolet	203	124336	running	0	118
16	34	12	Ryan Newman	Alltel (Roger Penske)	Dodge	203	110150	running	2	120
17	9	07	Clint Bowyer	Jack Daniel's (Richard Childress)	Chevrolet	203	85625	running	0	112
18	25	6	David Ragan	AAA Insurance (Jack Roush)	Ford	203	117200	running	0	109
19	2	16	Greg Biffle	3M (Jack Roush)	Ford	203	97225	running	20	111
20	27	4	Ward Burton	State Water Heaters / Lucas Oil / 57 Chevy (Larry McClure)	Chevrolet	203	76500	running	4	108
21	20	40	David Stremme	Tums (Chip Ganassi)	Dodge	202	76125	running	0	100
22	40	66	Jeff Green	Best Buy (Gene Haas)	Chevrolet	202	99983	running	0	97
23	12	00	David Reutimann	Dominos.com (Michael Waltrip)	Toyota	202	87108	running	0	94
24	30	7	Robby Gordon	Jim Beam (Robby Gordon)	Ford	202	75300	running	2	96
25	31	18	J.J. Yeley	Interstate Batteries / 57 Chevy (Joe Gibbs)	Chevrolet	202	103333	running	0	88
26	26	42	Juan Pablo Montoya	Texaco / Havoline (Chip Ganassi)	Dodge	202	109100	running	0	85
27	1	24	Jeff Gordon	DuPont / 57 Chevy (Rick Hendrick)	Chevrolet	202	135236	running	25	87
28	24	38	David Gilliland	M&M's (Yates Racing)	Ford	202	101264	running	0	79
29	41	70	Johnny Sauter	Yellow Transportation (Gene Haas)	Chevrolet	202	73775	running	0	76
30	36	26	Jamie McMurray	Irwin Industrial Tools (Jack Roush)	Ford	202	82400	running	0	73
31	3	9	Kasey Kahne	Dodge Dealers / UAW (Gillett Evernham Motorsports)	Dodge	201	117841	running	0	70
32	5	19	Elliott Sadler	Dodge Dealers / UAW (Gillett Evernham Motorsports)	Dodge	201	91745	running	0	67
33	22	88	Ricky Rudd	Snickers (Yates Racing)	Ford	201	104808	running	0	64
34	37	96	Tony Raines	DLP HDTV / 57 Chevy (Bill Saunders)	Chevrolet	201	78225	running	0	61
35	23	21	Bill Elliott	Little Debbie (Wood Brothers)	Ford	201	89289	running	0	58
36	43	10	Scott Riggs	Auto Value / Bumper to Bumper (James Rocco)	Dodge	201	78025	running	0	55
37	16	49	John Andretti	Paralyzed Veterans of America (Beth Ann Morgenthau)	Dodge	201	81633	running	0	52
38	33	41	Reed Sorenson	Target (Chip Ganassi)	Dodge	200	87422	running	0	49
39	38	15	Paul Menard	Menards / Sylvania / 57 Chevy (Dale Earnhardt, Inc.)	Chevrolet	167	69825	running	0	46
40	11	55	Michael Waltrip	NAPA Auto Parts (Michael Waltrip)	Toyota	135	69775	running	0	43
41	42	45	Chad McCumbee	Marathon American Spirit Motor Oil (Petty Enterprises)	Dodge	134	69725	running	0	40
42	10	01	Mark Martin	U.S. Army / 57 Chevy (Dale Earnhardt, Inc.)	Chevrolet	101	77665	oil leak	0	37
43	32	08	Joe Nemechek	E&M Motorsports (John Carter)	Dodge	92	68724	crash	0	34
Failed to qualify
POS	NAME	NBR	SPONSOR	OWNER	CAR					
44	Jeremy Mayfield	36	360 OTC	Bill Davis	Toyota					
45	Dale Jarrett	44	UPS	Michael Waltrip	Toyota					
46	Scott Wimmer	78	Furniture Row / 57 Chevy	Barney Visser	Chevrolet					
47	Kevin Lepage	37	Front Row Motorsports	Bob Jenkins	Dodge					
48	A.J. Allmendinger	84	Red Bull	Dietrich Mateschitz	Toyota					

Previous race: 2007 Centurion Boats at the Glen	Nextel Cup Series; 2007 season	Next race: 2007 Sharpie 500
