= Red Bull Racing Team =

NASCAR team owned by Red Bull

Coordinates: 35.5825°N 80.8129°W

- Owner(s): Dietrich Mateschitz; Chaleo Yoovidhya
- Base: Mooresville, North Carolina
- Series: Sprint Cup Series; Nationwide Series
- Race drivers: A. J. Allmendinger; Mattias Ekström; Bill Elliott; Kasey Kahne; Casey Mears; Boris Said; Mike Skinner; Reed Sorenson; Scott Speed; Brian Vickers; Cole Whitt
- Manufacturer: Dodge (2006); Toyota (2007–2011)
- Opened: 2006
- Closed: 2011

Career
- Races competed: Total: 286; Sprint Cup Series: 284; Nationwide Series: 2
- Drivers' Championships: Total: 0 Sprint Cup Series: 0 Nationwide Series: 0
- Race victories: Total: 2 Sprint Cup Series: 2 Nationwide Series: 0
- Pole positions: Total: 10; Sprint Cup Series: 10; Nationwide Series: 0

Red Bull Racing Team, also known as Team Red Bull, was a NASCAR team owned by Red Bull founders Dietrich Mateschitz and Chaleo Yoovidhya. The team was based in Mooresville, North Carolina in the United States and was managed by Jay Frye. The team suspended operations on December 8, 2011 and their cars were sold to BK Racing.

== History ==
=== Origins ===
After moving to a newer location, Roger Penske decided to sell his old facility. Then, on January 26, 2006, the newly formed team said that they would purchase the facility, and would hire 75 workers. However, the team was not allowed to race in the 2006 season because their manufacturer, Toyota, was not cleared to race, so the team decided that they would drive Dodges during the season. The team did not have any materials to make their race cars, so they purchased multiple cars from Bill Davis Racing.

=== 2006 season ===
The team was officially started in January, but they would not choose a driver until June 25, 2006, when Brian Vickers announced his decision to drive for the team on Wind Tunnel with Dave Despain. A couple months later, the team made their first NASCAR appearance with Bill Elliott as the driver, at Lowe's Motor Speedway in the No. 83 Victory Junction Gang Dodge, but they failed to qualify for the race. On October 24, 2006, the team chose former Champ Car driver A. J. Allmendinger as the second driver. They also made two other appearances at Atlanta Motor Speedway and Texas Motor Speedway, which like their first, they failed to qualify for both races. Then, announced on December 6, 2006, former Cup Series champion crew chief Doug Richert would serve as the crew chief for Vickers.

=== 2007 season ===
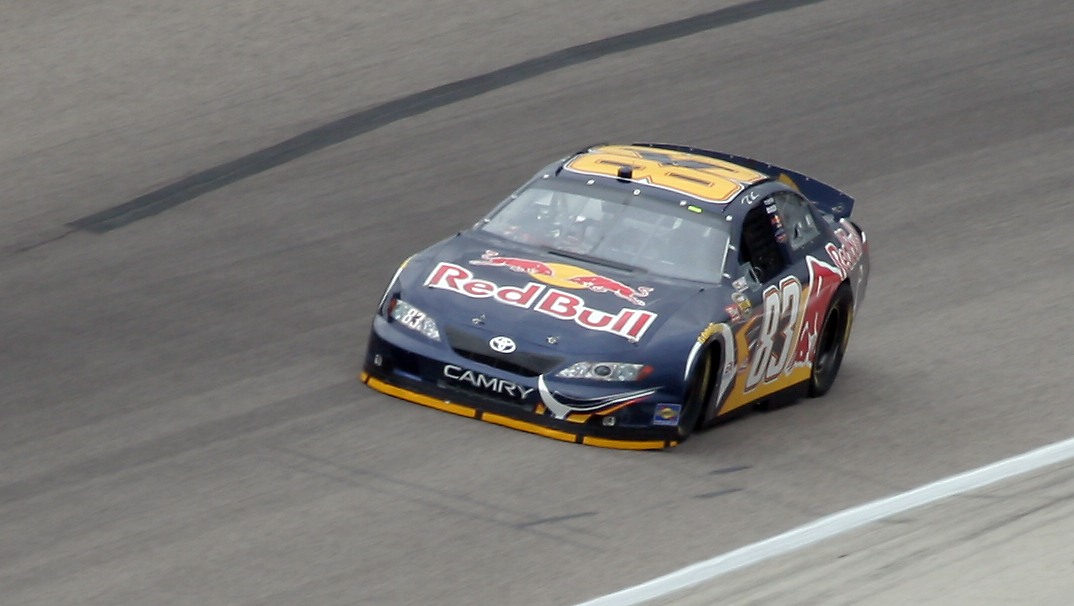
Brian Vickers driving for Red Bull in 2007 at Texas Motor Speedway.

During the 2007 season, the team moved to Toyota as the manufacturer. Both Vickers and Allmendinger failed to qualify for the 2007 Daytona 500. Allmendinger, in the first duel race, crashed with fellow competitor Robby Gordon on lap 24, causing heavy damage to both their race cars. Vickers blew a right rear tire on lap 51 in the second duel race, ending his chances of making the Daytona 500. One week later, Vickers qualified for the 2007 Auto Club 500, which resulted in the team receiving their first top-ten. After failing to qualify for four consecutive races, Allmendinger qualified for the 2007 Food City 500 held at Bristol Motor Speedway. During the 2007 Coca-Cola 600, NASCAR's longest race, Vickers was able to finish in the top-five. On October 5, 2007, the team's development driver, Scott Speed finished seventh in an ARCA race at Talladega Superspeedway. Allmendinger's team had a forty-third-place finish in the final owners' standings and had 19 DNQ's. Despite Vickers ending the season with five top-ten finishes with one being a top-five in the Coca-Cola 600, where he led seventy-six laps and finished 5th, Vickers still failed to qualify for 13 races. Vickers' team ended the season with a 38th owners' standings position.

=== 2008 season ===
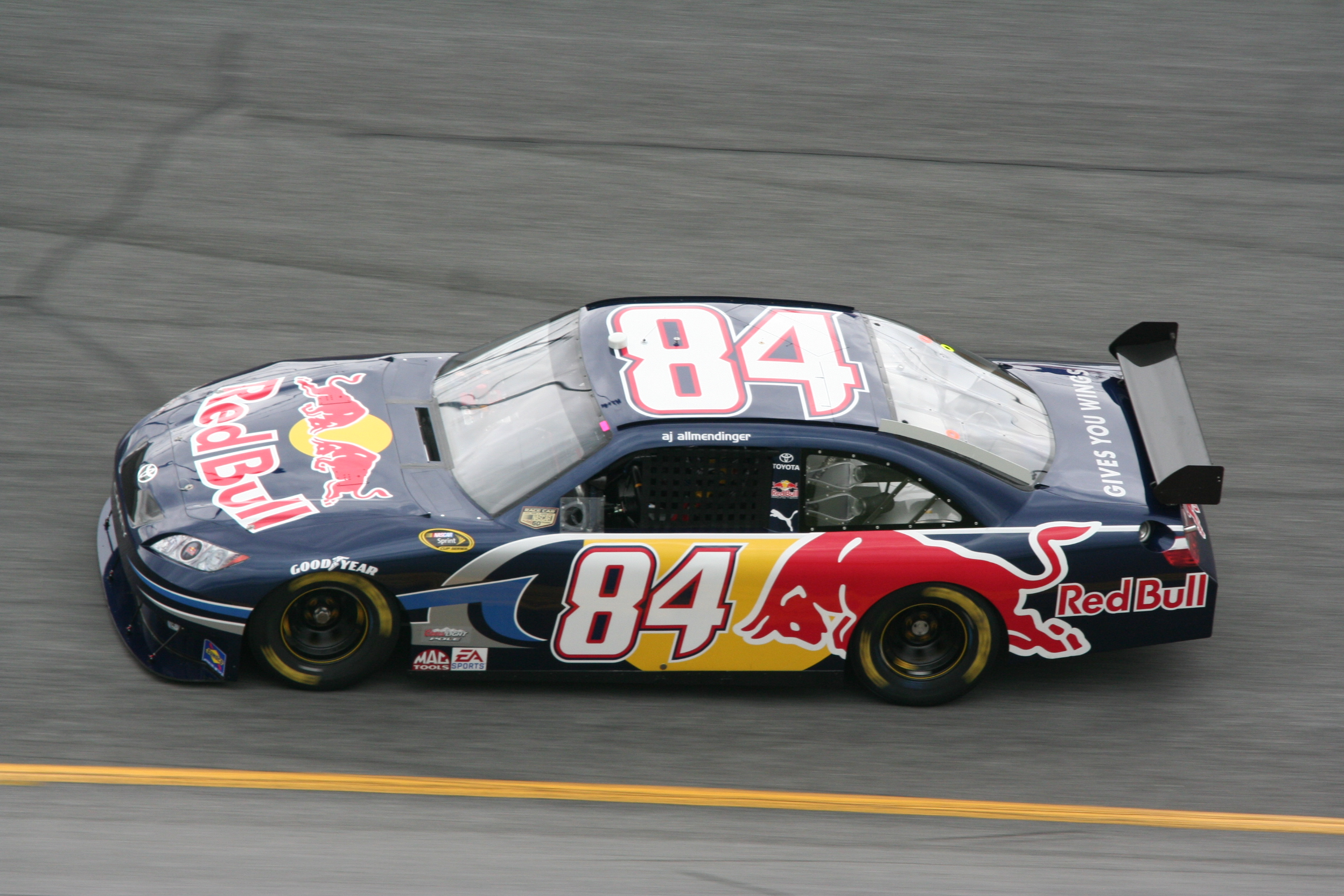
A. J. Allmendinger drove for the team from 2006 to 2008.

In 2008, Kevin Hamlin became the crew chief for Vickers. Hamlin's past crew chief roles include stints with Dave Blaney's No. 22 Toyota, preceded by nine years of crew chief duties with Richard Childress Racing drivers including Jeff Burton, Kevin Harvick, and Dale Earnhardt. Hamlin has amassed nine previous Cup wins; five of those with Earnhardt Sr. Said Sawyer of hiring Hamlin: "Finding the right crew chief for the 83 team was a pivotal decision in an effort to restructure the foundation on that team. We need a crew chief with not only the right experience and background to work effectively with our driver and crew, but someone who also shares the same vision for success. We found that package with Kevin Hamlin. Our focus between now and Daytona is not only getting our cars up to speed for the season opener, but also getting Kevin up to speed working with Red Bull, Brian (Vickers) and the 83 team." Due in large part to the additions of Frye and Hamlin, the No. 83 team has been shown to be the most improved in the series, qualifying for all the current races and secured a Top 35 exemption following the spring race at Bristol. Also in 2008, Allmendinger failed to make the first three races of 2008 and was replaced by Mike Skinner on a temporary basis starting with the spring Atlanta race. Allmendinger returned at the Aaron's 499 at Talladega with a new silver paint scheme, and won the Sprint Showdown two weeks later, making him eligible for the All-Star Race. Allmendinger also recorded a 10th-place finish at the Allstate 400 at the Brickyard. In May, even though Vickers had not won a race for the team prior to Sprint All-Star Race XXIV, they won the All-Star Pit Crew Competition. Later in the season, Allmendinger announced that he was going to leave Red Bull to race for Richard Petty Motorsports in 2009.

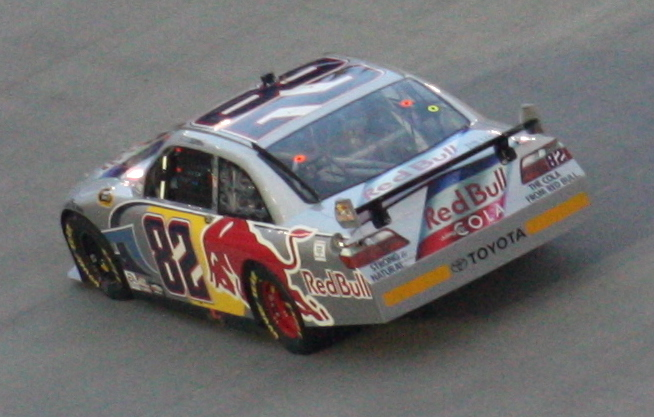
Scott Speed drove for the team in the Cup Series from 2008 to 2010.

=== 2009 season ===
2009 ended up being a high-water mark for the team, as Vickers scored the team's first victory, and the second of his career, at Michigan in August. This was part of a strong late-summer run that resulted in Vickers taking the last spot in the 2009 Chase for the Sprint Cup at Richmond in September, also a first for the Red Bull team. Unfortunately, an underwhelming Chase performance resulted in Vickers finishing 12th in the final points. Meanwhile, the team signed Scott Speed to replace Allmendinger in the renumbered 82 car. However, Speed could manage only a distant second to Joey Logano in the Raybestos Rookie of the Year standings.

=== 2010 season ===
For the 2010 season, Speed and Vickers remained with the team, but on May 21, Vickers experienced medical problems, which resulted in him missing the rest of the season. His replacements were Casey Mears, Reed Sorenson, Mattias Ekstrom, Boris Said, and Kasey Kahne. Speed was let go at the end of the season, and he in turn filed a lawsuit against Red Bull.

=== 2011 season ===
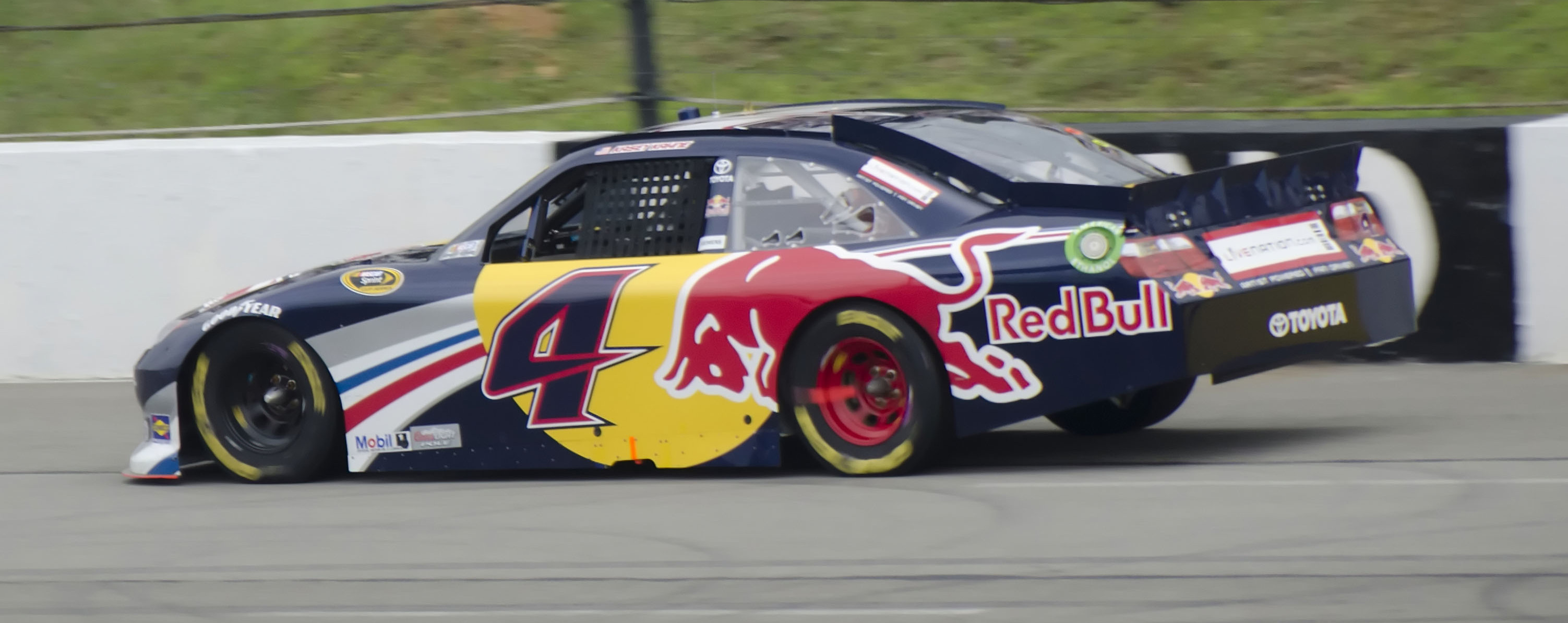
Kasey Kahne drove for the team from October 2010 to November 2011.

For the 2011 season, Kahne became a full-time driver for the team, driving car No. 4 (formerly No. 82), and Vickers returned to drive the No. 83 car. On June 20, 2011, the Associated Press reported that Red Bull was planning to leave NASCAR at the end of the season. The team's on-track struggles, combined with a lackluster outreach to the 18–34 demographic, forced their departure. Despite this, Kahne scored the team's final victory at the November race at Phoenix, while Vickers struggled for most of the year, resulting in a 25th-place points finish. Kahne finished the season in 14th. The team fielded a third car, numbered 84, in the final two races of the season, with development driver Cole Whitt behind the wheel. Whitt finished 25th at Phoenix, but crashed out just past halfway at Homestead, finishing 37th. The team officially closed on December 8, 2011. The team's cars, owners points, and equipment were purchased by former TRG Motorsports executive Ron Devine to form BK Racing.

=== Cup Series results ===
==== #83 Car results ====
NASCAR Sprint Cup Series results
Year	Driver	No.	Make	1	2	3	4	5	6	7	8	9	10	11	12	13	14	15	16	17	18	19	20	21	22	23	24	25	26	27	28	29	30	31	32	33	34	35	36	NSCC	Pts
2006	Bill Elliott	83	Dodge	DAY	CAL	LVS	ATL	BRI	MAR	TEX	PHO	TAL	RCH	DAR	CLT	DOV	POC	MCH	SON	DAY	CHI	NHA	POC	IND	GLN	MCH	BRI	CAL	RCH	NHA	DOV	KAN	TAL	CLT; DNQ	MAR	ATL	TEX	PHO	HOM	NA	-
2007	Brian Vickers	83	Toyota	DAY; DNQ	CAL; 10	LVS; DNQ	ATL; 42	BRI; 15	MAR; DNQ	TEX; 14	PHO; DNQ	TAL; DNQ	RCH; DNQ	DAR; 43	CLT; 5	DOV; 19	POC; 35	MCH; 41	SON; DNQ	NHA; DNQ	DAY; 29	CHI; DNQ	IND; 21	POC; 29	GLN; 41	MCH; 8	BRI; DNQ	CAL; 8	RCH; 24	NHA; 43	DOV; 16	KAN; DNQ	TAL; 39	CLT; DNQ	MAR; DNQ	ATL; 10	TEX; 23	PHO; 21	HOM; 42	38th	2351
2008	Brian Vickers	83	Toyota	DAY; 12	CAL; 11	LVS; 24	ATL; 9	BRI; 39	MAR; 23	TEX; 16	PHO; 25	TAL; 5	RCH; 28	DAR; 25	CLT; 42	DOV; 13	POC; 2	MCH; 4	SON; 14	NHA; 16	DAY; 11	CHI; 6	IND; 42	POC; 28	GLN; 18	MCH; 7	BRI; 20	CAL; 12	RCH; 36	NHA; 35	DOV; 31	KAN; 15	TAL; 35	CLT; 18	MAR; 11	ATL; 21	TEX; 18	PHO; 42	HOM; 32	20th	3628
2009	Brian Vickers	83	Toyota	DAY; 39	CAL; 10	LVS; 8	ATL; 5	BRI; 29	MAR; 33	TEX; 16	PHO; 19	TAL; 8	RCH; 15	DAR; 31	CLT; 5	DOV; 25	POC; 21	MCH; 9	SON; 16	NHA; 35	DAY; 7	CHI; 7	IND; 5	POC; 6	GLN; 11	MCH; 1	BRI; 12	ATL; 7	RCH; 7	NHA; 11	DOV; 18	KAN; 37	CAL; 29	CLT; 34	MAR; 11	TAL; 13	TEX; 26	PHO; 38	HOM; 20	12th	5929
2010	Brian Vickers	83	Toyota	DAY; 15	CAL; 12	LVS; 31	ATL; 7	BRI; 15	MAR; 6	PHO; 37	TEX; 38	TAL; 29	RCH; 20	DAR; 10																										25th	3502
2010	Casey Mears	83	Toyota												DOV; 22	CLT; 29	POC; 23	MCH; 36																						25th	3502
2010	Mattias Ekström	83	Toyota																SON; 21										RCH; 31											25th	3502
2010	Reed Sorenson	83	Toyota																	NHA; 24	DAY; 8	CHI; 27	IND; 35	POC; 32		MCH; 26	BRI; 15	ATL; 14		NHA; 27	DOV; 16	KAN; 30	CAL; 27	CLT; 18						25th	3502
2010	Boris Said	83	Toyota																						GLN; 38															25th	3502
2010	Kasey Kahne	83	Toyota																																MAR; 14	TAL; 26	TEX; 13	PHO; 30	HOM; 6	25th	3502
2011	Brian Vickers	83	Toyota	DAY; 31	PHO; 30	LVS; 10	BRI; 36	CAL; 8	MAR; 17	TEX; 27	TAL; 38	RCH; 10	DAR; 34	DOV; 5	CLT; 18	KAN; 16	POC; 22	MCH; 10	SON; 36	DAY; 12	KEN; 27	NHA; 34	IND; 15	POC; 39	GLN; 18	MCH; 15	BRI; 21	ATL; 11	RCH; 33	CHI; 13	NHA; 5	DOV; 14	KAN; 19	CLT; 20	TAL; 5	MAR; 30	TEX; 21	PHO; 23	HOM; 17	25th	846

==== #84/#82/#4 car results ====
NASCAR Sprint Cup Series results
Year	Driver	No.	Make	1	2	3	4	5	6	7	8	9	10	11	12	13	14	15	16	17	18	19	20	21	22	23	24	25	26	27	28	29	30	31	32	33	34	35	36	NSCC	Pts
2006	A. J. Allmendinger	84	Dodge	DAY	CAL	LVS	ATL	BRI	MAR	TEX	PHO	TAL	RCH	DAR	CLT	DOV	POC	MCH	SON	DAY	CHI	NHA	POC	IND	GLN	MCH	BRI	CAL	RCH	NHA	DOV	KAN	TAL	CLT	MAR	ATL; DNQ	TEX; DNQ	PHO	HOM	NA	-
2007	A. J. Allmendinger	84	Toyota	DAY; DNQ	CAL; DNQ	LVS; DNQ	ATL; DNQ	BRI; 40	MAR; 38	TEX; DNQ	PHO; DNQ	TAL; DNQ	RCH; 32	DAR; 36	CLT; 31	DOV; 33	POC; 39	MCH; 31	SON; DNQ	NHA; DNQ	DAY; DNQ	CHI; DNQ	IND; DNQ	POC; DNQ	GLN; DNQ	MCH; DNQ	BRI; 35	CAL; 18	RCH; 23	NHA; 33	DOV; 43	KAN; DNQ	TAL; DNQ	CLT; 15	MAR; 35	ATL; 16	TEX; 39	PHO; DNQ	HOM; DNQ	43rd	1601
2008	A. J. Allmendinger	84	Toyota	DAY; DNQ	CAL; DNQ	LVS; DNQ						TAL; 30	RCH; 39	DAR; 27	CLT; 20	DOV; 37	POC; 12	MCH; 19	SON; 37	NHA; 43	DAY; 42	CHI; 13	IND; 10	POC; 19	GLN; 11	MCH; 28	BRI; 34	CAL; 14	RCH; 43	NHA; 38	DOV; 16	KAN; 9								35th	2705
2008	Mike Skinner	84	Toyota				ATL; 27	BRI; 40	MAR; 31	TEX; 29	PHO; 28																						TAL; 31	CLT; 39						35th	2705
2008	Scott Speed	84	Toyota																																MAR; 30	ATL; 34	TEX; 33	PHO; 41	HOM; 16	35th	2705
2009	Scott Speed	82	Toyota	DAY; 35	CAL; 41	LVS; 21	ATL; 35	BRI; 28	MAR; 39	TEX; DNQ	PHO; 34	TAL; 5	RCH; 33	DAR; DNQ	CLT; 18	DOV; 37	POC; 32	MCH; 37	SON; DNQ	NHA; 36	DAY; 31	CHI; 36	IND; 31	POC; 23	GLN; 22	MCH; 34	BRI; 15	ATL; 24	RCH; 36	NHA; 31	DOV; 25	KAN; 27	CAL; 21	CLT; 28	MAR; 31	TAL; 27	TEX; 18	PHO; 33	HOM; 27	36th	2635
2010	Scott Speed	82	Toyota	DAY; 19	CAL; 11	LVS; 22	ATL; 10	BRI; 31	MAR; 33	PHO; 21	TEX; 16	TAL; 15	RCH; 35	DAR; 28	DOV; 23	CLT; 30	POC; 20	MCH; 28	SON; 18	NHA; 27	DAY; 10	CHI; 30	IND; 25	POC; 26	GLN; 43	MCH; 25	BRI; 33	ATL; 34	RCH; 24	NHA; 36	DOV; 32	KAN; 19	CAL; 24	CLT; 19	MAR; 23	TAL; 29	TEX; 27	PHO; 35	HOM; 23	31st	3178
2011	Kasey Kahne	4	Toyota	DAY; 25	PHO; 6	LVS; 14	BRI; 9	CAL; 9	MAR; 39	TEX; 21	TAL; 37	RCH; 3	DAR; 4*	DOV; 36	CLT; 22	KAN; 14	POC; 12	MCH; 28	SON; 20	DAY; 4	KEN; 13	NHA; 6	IND; 18*	POC; 28	GLN; 26	MCH; 7	BRI; 11	ATL; 34	RCH; 38	CHI; 12	NHA; 15	DOV; 4	KAN; 2	CLT; 4	TAL; 6	MAR; 25	TEX; 3	PHO; 1	HOM; 7	14th	1041

==== Third car results ====
NASCAR Sprint Cup Series results
Year	Driver	No.	Make	1	2	3	4	5	6	7	8	9	10	11	12	13	14	15	16	17	18	19	20	21	22	23	24	25	26	27	28	29	30	31	32	33	34	35	36	NSCC	Pts
2008	Scott Speed	82	Toyota	DAY	CAL	LVS	ATL	BRI	MAR	TEX	PHO	TAL	RCH	DAR	CLT	DOV	POC	MCH	SON	NHA	DAY	CHI	IND	POC	GLN	MCH	BRI	CAL	RCH	NHA	DOV	KAN	TAL	CLT; DNQ	MAR	ATL	TEX	PHO	HOM		
2011	Cole Whitt	84	Toyota	DAY	PHO	LVS	BRI	CAL	MAR	TEX	TAL	RCH	DAR	DOV	CLT	KAN	POC	MCH	INF	DAY	KEN	NHA	IND	POC	GLN	MCH	BRI	ATL	RCH	CHI	NHA	DOV	KAN	CLT	TAL	MAR	TEX	PHO; 25	HOM; 37	49th	26

=== Nationwide Series ===
Cole Whitt drove the No. 84 for the final two races of the 2010 season, finishing in the top-twenty in both.

==== No. 84 Results ====
NASCAR Nationwide Series results
Year	Team	No.	Make	1	2	3	4	5	6	7	8	9	10	11	12	13	14	15	16	17	18	19	20	21	22	23	24	25	26	27	28	29	30	31	32	33	34	35	NNSC	Pts	Ref
2010	Cole Whitt	84	Toyota	DAY	CAL	LVS	BRI	NSH	PHO	TEX	TAL	RCH	DAR	DOV	CLT	NSH	KEN	ROA	NHA	DAY	CHI	GTY	IRP	IOW	GLN	MCH	BRI	CGV	ATL	RCH	DOV	KAN	CAL	CLT	GTY	TEX	PHO; 15	HOM; 17	70th	118	

== See also ==
- Red Bull Racing
- Racing Bulls
