= 2008 Pep Boys Auto 500 =

Race details
- Race 33 of 36 in the 2008 NASCAR Sprint Cup Series season
- Atlanta Motor Speedway (after 1997, before Atlanta International Speedway)
- Date: October 26, 2008
- Official name: Pep Boys Auto 500
- Location: Atlanta Motor Speedway, Hampton, Georgia
- Course: Permanent racing facility
- Course length: 1.54 miles (2.48 km)
- Distance: 325 laps, 500.5 mi (805.476 km)
- Weather: Temperatures reaching up to 70 °F (21 °C); wind speeds reaching up to 14 miles per hour (23 km/h)
- Average speed: 134.272 miles per hour (216.090 km/h)

Pole position
Driver	Jimmie Johnson	Hendrick Motorsports
- Time: 2008 Owner's Points

Most laps led
Driver	Matt Kenseth	Roush Fenway Racing
- Laps: 128

Winner
No. 99	Carl Edwards	Roush Fenway Racing

Television in the United States
- Network: ABC
- Announcers: Jerry Punch, Dale Jarrett and Andy Petree

The 2008 Pep Boys Auto 500, is the thirty-third race of the 2008 NASCAR Sprint Cup season and the third to the last race of the Chase for the Sprint Cup. Pep Boys Auto 500 was held on October 26 at Atlanta Motor Speedway in Hampton, Georgia. ABC will carry the race beginning at 1 PM US EDT and Performance Racing Network along with Sirius Satellite Radio will have radio coverage starting at that same time. This race will be the last at this track in the current Chase format as they will swap this date for the Labor Day weekend date as a night race with Auto Club Speedway, and the Southern California track assuming the Chase date for 2009.

== Pre-race News ==
- Team Red Bull's #83 Toyota driven by Brian Vickers was slapped with a very stiff penalty after last week's race at Martinsville. After a post-race inspection at NASCAR's Research and Development center discovered that the sheet metal used was illegal after being lightened to below minimum gauge, NASCAR penalized crew chief Kevin Hamlin with an indefinite suspension and a US $100,000 fine (donated to the NASCAR Foundation.) The stock car racing body also gave an indefinite suspension to car chief Craig Smokstad, and deducted 150 owners and drivers points from the team. It had been speculated the metal had been dipped in acid, but NASCAR and Vickers denied it. (Normally, such an infraction would be a six-week suspension, but only four races remained; Ryan Pemberton was named permanent crew chief for the #83 team for 2009.)
- Michael Waltrip will make his 1,000th NASCAR start (all national and regional series; was the 1983 Baby Grand National (4-cylinder) Champion) in this race.
- Kyle Petty will make his 850th career start.

== Qualifying ==
- Qualifying was rained out for the 10th time this season, which is a new record. Because of the cancellation, points leader Jimmie Johnson will start on the pole as per the NASCAR rule book. It also marks the third consecutive time that the field will be lined up according to the points standings.

Failed to make race as qualifying was canceled due to rain: Joey Logano (#02), Bryan Clauson (#40).
NOTE: The #08 car, to have been driven by Johnny Sauter was withdrawn earlier in the week.
