= 2009 Chevy Rock & Roll 400 =

Race details
- Race 26 of 36 in the 2009 NASCAR Sprint Cup Series season
- Richmond International Speedway
- Date: September 12, 2009
- Official name: Chevy Rock & Roll 400
- Location: Richmond International Raceway, Richmond, Virginia)
- Course: Permanent racing facility
- Course length: 0.75 miles (1.207 km)
- Distance: 400 laps, 300.0 mi (482.803 km)
- Weather: Temperatures averaging around 67.8 °F (19.9 °C); wind speeds up to 7 miles per hour (11 km/h)
- Average speed: 96.601 miles per hour (155.464 km/h)

Pole position
Driver	Mark Martin	Hendrick Motorsports
- Time: 21.292

Most laps led
Driver	Denny Hamlin	Joe Gibbs Racing
- Laps: 299

Winner
No. 11	Denny Hamlin	Joe Gibbs Racing

Television in the United States
- Network: ESPN
- Announcers: Jerry Punch; Dale Jarrett; Andy Petree

The 2009 Chevy Rock & Roll 400 was the 26th race in the 2009 NASCAR Sprint Cup season, and served as the last race in the "regular season" before the 2009 Chase for the Sprint Cup. The 400-lap, 300-mile (480 km) race was held on Saturday night, September 12, 2009, at the 0.75-mile (1.21 km) Richmond International Raceway in Henrico County, Virginia outside the state capital city, and was telecast on ABC with radio being handled by MRN Radio (over the air/terrestrial) and Sirius XM Radio (satellite). After this race, the top twelve drivers in the points standings were determined to enter the ten-race playoff to decide the 2009 Sprint Cup Champion, and their points were reset to 5,000 points with a ten-point bonus for each win they compile during the first 26 events this year. Denny Hamlin won the race, Brian Vickers gets the last spot, leaving Kyle Busch who won four times out, along with Matt Kenseth. It is the first time he has failed to make the cut.

== Race ==
The race was mainly a duel between Jeff Gordon and Denny Hamlin. The duo led 396 of the 400 laps run. Gordon got shoved to sixth, but made it up to third late in the race. Hamlin then held off Kurt Busch to win.

== Race results ==
Top Ten Finishers
Pos.	Car #	Driver	Make	Team
1	11	Denny Hamlin	Toyota	Joe Gibbs Racing
2	2	Kurt Busch	Dodge	Penske Racing
3	24	Jeff Gordon	Chevrolet	Hendrick Motorsports
4	5	Mark Martin	Chevrolet	Hendrick Motorsports
5	18	Kyle Busch	Toyota	Joe Gibbs Racing
6	33	Clint Bowyer	Chevrolet	Richard Childress Racing
7	83	Brian Vickers	Toyota	Red Bull Racing Team
8	77	Sam Hornish Jr.	Dodge	Penske Racing
9	29	Kevin Harvick	Chevrolet	Richard Childress Racing
10	39	Ryan Newman	Chevrolet	Stewart Haas Racing

== Chase Points Standings Starting at New Hampshire ==
1. 5-Mark Martin 5040 Points (4th Appearance)
2. 14-Tony Stewart 5030 Points (5th Appearance)
3. 48-Jimmie Johnson 5030 Points (6th Appearance)
4. 11-Denny Hamlin 5020 Points (4th Appearance)
5. 9-Kasey Kahne 5020 Points (2nd Appearance)
6. 24-Jeff Gordon 5010 Points (5th Appearance)
7. 2-Kurt Busch 5010 Points (4th Appearance)
8. 83-Brian Vickers 5010 Points (1st Appearance)
9. 99-Carl Edwards 5000 Points (4th Appearance)
10. 39-Ryan Newman 5000 Points (3rd Appearance)
11. 42-Juan Pablo Montoya 5000 Points (1st Appearance)
12. 16-Greg Biffle 5000 Points (3rd Appearance)
