= 2009 Brickyard 400 =

2009 Allstate 400 at the Brickyard
Race details
- Race 20 of 36 in the 2009 NASCAR Sprint Cup Series
- 2009 Brickyard 400 program cover
- Date: July 26, 2009
- Location: Indianapolis Motor Speedway in Speedway, Indiana
- Course: Permanent racing facility
- Course length: 2.5 miles (4.023 km)
- Distance: 160 laps, 400 mi (643.737 km)
- Weather: Temperatures up to 82 °F (28 °C); wind speeds up to 15.9 miles per hour (25.6 km/h)
- Average speed: 145.882 miles per hour (234.774 km/h)

Pole position
Driver	Mark Martin	Hendrick Motorsports
- Time: 49.436

Most laps led
Driver	Juan Pablo Montoya	Earnhardt Ganassi Racing
- Laps: 116

Winner
No. 48	Jimmie Johnson	Hendrick Motorsports

Television in the United States
- Network: ESPN
- Announcers: Jerry Punch, Andy Petree and Dale Jarrett

Indianapolis Motor Speedway, the race track where the race was held.

The 2009 Allstate 400 at the Brickyard, the 16th running of the event, was the twenty-first race of the 2009 NASCAR Sprint Cup season and the sixteenth NASCAR race at the Indianapolis Motor Speedway (IMS). It was the first race under the ESPN/ABC section of the TV coverage for the 2009 season. The 160-lap, 400 miles (640 km) event took place on July 26 at the 2.5 miles (4.0 km) IMS located in Speedway, Indiana (a separate town surrounded by Indianapolis). Along with ESPN, the IMS Radio Network, working with Performance Racing Network, provided radio coverage on terrestrial radio, World Harvest Radio International also provided Shortwave feed of the IMS coverage, and with Sirius XM Radio holding the satellite radio rights. Juan Pablo Montoya dominated the race leading almost 120 laps, but after a pit penalty while under green flag conditions toward the end of the race, Jimmie Johnson held off a hard charging Mark Martin to claim victory, his third triumph at the storied venue. The race was known as Allstate 400 for the last time, as Allstate Insurance announced that it would not renew its sponsorship of the race.

== Tires ==
Following the fiasco surrounding tire wear in the 2008 race, infuriating the fans and everyone else involved, Goodyear held three tire tests afterward, with the most recent tire test held on June 15–16. The drivers there agreed that the tire wear was much better than last year, mostly because the Car of Tomorrow was not run at IMS in 2007.

== Race results ==
Place	Car #	Driver	Car make	Team
1	48	Jimmie Johnson	Chevrolet	Hendrick Motorsports
2	5	Mark Martin	Chevrolet	Hendrick Motorsports
3	14	Tony Stewart	Chevrolet	Stewart Haas Racing
4	16	Greg Biffle	Ford	Roush Fenway Racing
5	83	Brian Vickers	Toyota	Red Bull Racing Team
6	29	Kevin Harvick	Chevrolet	Richard Childress Racing
7	9	Kasey Kahne	Dodge	Richard Petty Motorsports
8	00	David Reutimann	Toyota	Michael Waltrip Racing
9	24	Jeff Gordon	Chevrolet	Hendrick Motorsports
10	17	Matt Kenseth	Ford	Roush Fenway Racing
11	42	Juan Pablo Montoya	Chevrolet	Earnhardt Ganassi Racing
12	20	Joey Logano	Toyota	Joe Gibbs Racing
13	43	Reed Sorenson	Dodge	Richard Petty Motorsports
14	39	Ryan Newman	Chevrolet	Stewart Haas Racing
15	99	Carl Edwards	Ford	Roush Fenway Racing
16	12	David Stremme	Dodge	Penske Championship Racing
17	1	Martin Truex Jr.	Chevrolet	Earnhardt Ganassi Racing
18	33	Clint Bowyer	Chevrolet	Richard Childress Racing
19	07	Casey Mears	Chevrolet	Richard Childress Racing
20	44	A. J. Allmendinger	Dodge	Richard Petty Motorsports
21	26	Jamie McMurray	Ford	Roush Fenway Racing
22	47	Marcos Ambrose	Toyota	JTG Daugherty Racing
23	96	Bobby Labonte	Ford	Hall of Fame Racing
24	6	David Ragan	Ford	Roush Fenway Racing
25	31	Jeff Burton	Chevrolet	Richard Childress Racing
26	21	Bill Elliott	Ford	Wood Brothers Racing
27	2	Kurt Busch	Dodge	Penske Championship Racing
28	7	Robby Gordon	Toyota	Robby Gordon Motorsports
29	98	Paul Menard	Ford	Yates Racing
30	71	David Gilliland	Chevrolet	TRG Motorsports
31	82	Scott Speed	Toyota	Red Bull Racing Team
32	34	John Andretti	Chevrolet	Front Row Motorsports
33	08	Terry Labonte	Toyota	Carter/Simo Racing
34	11	Denny Hamlin	Toyota	Joe Gibbs Racing
35	55	Michael Waltrip	Toyota	Michael Waltrip Racing
36	88	Dale Earnhardt Jr.	Chevrolet	Hendrick Motorsports
37	77	Sam Hornish Jr.	Dodge	Penske Championship Racing
38	18	Kyle Busch	Toyota	Joe Gibbs Racing
39	78	Regan Smith	Chevrolet	Furniture Row Racing
40	19	Elliott Sadler	Dodge	Richard Petty Motorsports
41	36	Mike Skinner	Toyota	Tommy Baldwin Racing
42	66	Dave Blaney	Toyota	Prism Motorsports
43	87	Joe Nemechek	Toyota	NEMCO Motorsports
Failed to Qualify or withdrew
44	09	Sterling Marlin	Dodge	Phoenix Racing
45	13	Max Papis	Toyota	Germain Racing
46	75	Derrike Cope	Dodge	Cope/Keller Racing
WD	64	Mike Wallace	Toyota	Gunselman Motorsports
