= 2009 LifeLock.com 400 =

Race details
- Race 19 of 36 in the 2009 NASCAR Sprint Cup Series season
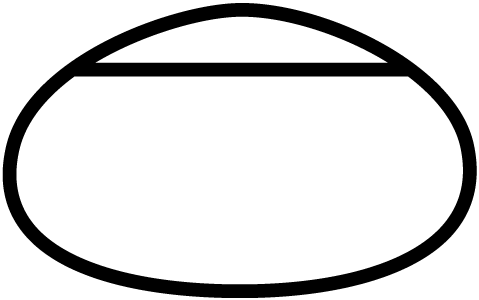
- Layout of Chicagoland Speedway
- Date: July 11, 2009
- Official name: LifeLock.com 400
- Location: Chicagoland Speedway (Joliet, Illinois)
- Course: Permanent racing facility
- Course length: 1.5 miles (2.414 km)
- Distance: 267 laps, 400.5 mi (644.542 km)
- Weather: Temperatures reaching a low of 69.1 °F (20.6 °C); wind speeds up to 11.1 miles per hour (17.9 km/h)
- Average speed: 133.804 miles per hour (215.337 km/h)

Pole position
Driver	Brian Vickers	Red Bull Racing Team

Most laps led
Driver	Mark Martin	Hendrick Motorsports
- Laps: 195

Winner
No. 5	Mark Martin	Hendrick Motorsports

Television in the United States
- Network: Turner Network Television
- Announcers: Ralph Sheheen, Wally Dallenbach Jr. and Kyle Petty

The 2009 LifeLock.com 400 was the nineteenth race of the 2009 NASCAR Sprint Cup schedule, marking the start of the second half of the season.

== Summary ==
This 267 lap 400.5 miles (644.5 km) event was held on Saturday night, July 11 at the 1.5 miles (2.4 km) Chicagoland Speedway. This would be the last TV broadcast of the year for the TNT Summer Series, with radio being handled by Sirius XM Radio (satellite) and MRN (over-the-air) starting at 7 PM US EDT. The green flag waved shortly after 8:17 or 8:19 PM US EDT.

=== Pre-race news ===
Michael Waltrip Racing held a press conference on Tuesday July 7, with the announcements being that driver/owner Michael Waltrip will run a limited schedule in 2010, with one of those races being the 52nd Daytona 500, and replacing him as the third full-time driver will be Martin Truex Jr., who will leave Earnhardt Ganassi Racing at the end of the 2009 season, stepping down from the #1 Chevrolet Impala SS to drive the #56 Toyota Camry.

=== Qualifying ===
Brian Vickers won his 5th pole of the season with rookie Scott Speed taking 2nd position, marking the first time both Red Bull teammates started a NASCAR race on the front row.

=== Race recap ===
Mark Martin dominated the race, leading 4 times for 195 laps, but would be passed by Jimmie Johnson on the third to last restart. The race would then have some wild final laps, as Martin went to the lead with 15 laps left after a pass on Brian Vickers when he and Denny Hamlin touched. Jeff Gordon was the highest car with fresh tires, making up six spots in only two laps, but would finish 2nd as Mark Martin pulled away from the rest of the field restarting on the outside lane and would go on to win his 4th race of the season. By finishing 1st and 2nd in both races sponsored by LifeLock this season, Mark Martin and Jeff Gordon win the Musgrave family (no relation to Ted Musgrave) $1,000,000.

=== Results ===
Top Ten Finishers
Pos.	Car #	Driver	Make	Team
1	5	Mark Martin	Chevrolet	Hendrick Motorsports
2	24	Jeff Gordon	Chevrolet	Hendrick Motorsports
3	9	Kasey Kahne	Dodge	Richard Petty Motorsports
4	14	Tony Stewart	Chevrolet	Stewart Haas Racing
5	11	Denny Hamlin	Toyota	Joe Gibbs Racing
6	39	Ryan Newman	Chevrolet	Stewart Haas Racing
7	83	Brian Vickers	Toyota	Red Bull Racing Team
8	48	Jimmie Johnson	Chevrolet	Hendrick Motorsports
9	33	Clint Bowyer	Chevrolet	Richard Childress Racing
10	42	Juan Pablo Montoya	Chevrolet	Earnhardt Ganassi Racing
