= 2009 Auto Club 500 =

Race details
- Race 2 of 36 in the 2009 NASCAR Sprint Cup Series
- 2009 Auto Club 500 program cover
- Date: February 22, 2009
- Official name: Auto Club 500
- Location: Auto Club Speedway, Fontana, California
- Course: Permanent racing facility
- Course length: 2.0 miles (3.23 km)
- Distance: 250 laps, 500 mi (804.672 km)
- Weather: Temperatures up to 66.2 °F (19.0 °C); wind speeds up to 6 miles per hour (9.7 km/h)
- Average speed: 135.839 miles per hour (218.612 km/h)

Pole position
Driver	Brian Vickers	Red Bull Racing Team
- Time: 39.250

Most laps led
Driver	Matt Kenseth	Roush Fenway Racing
- Laps: 84

Winner
No. 17	Matt Kenseth	Roush Fenway Racing

Television in the United States
- Network: Fox Broadcasting Company
- Announcers: Mike Joy, Darrell Waltrip and Larry McReynolds

The 2009 Auto Club 500 was the second race of the 2009 NASCAR Sprint Cup season. the 500 miles (800 km) race occurred on February 22, 2009, at the 2 miles (3.2 km) Auto Club Speedway in Fontana, California. Fox broadcast the race beginning at 5 pm EST with radio coverage on MRN (terrestrial) and SiriusXM (satellite) starting at 5:15 pm US EST. The race started at 3 pm local time, and ran into prime time, counterprogramming against the Academy Awards.

== Background ==
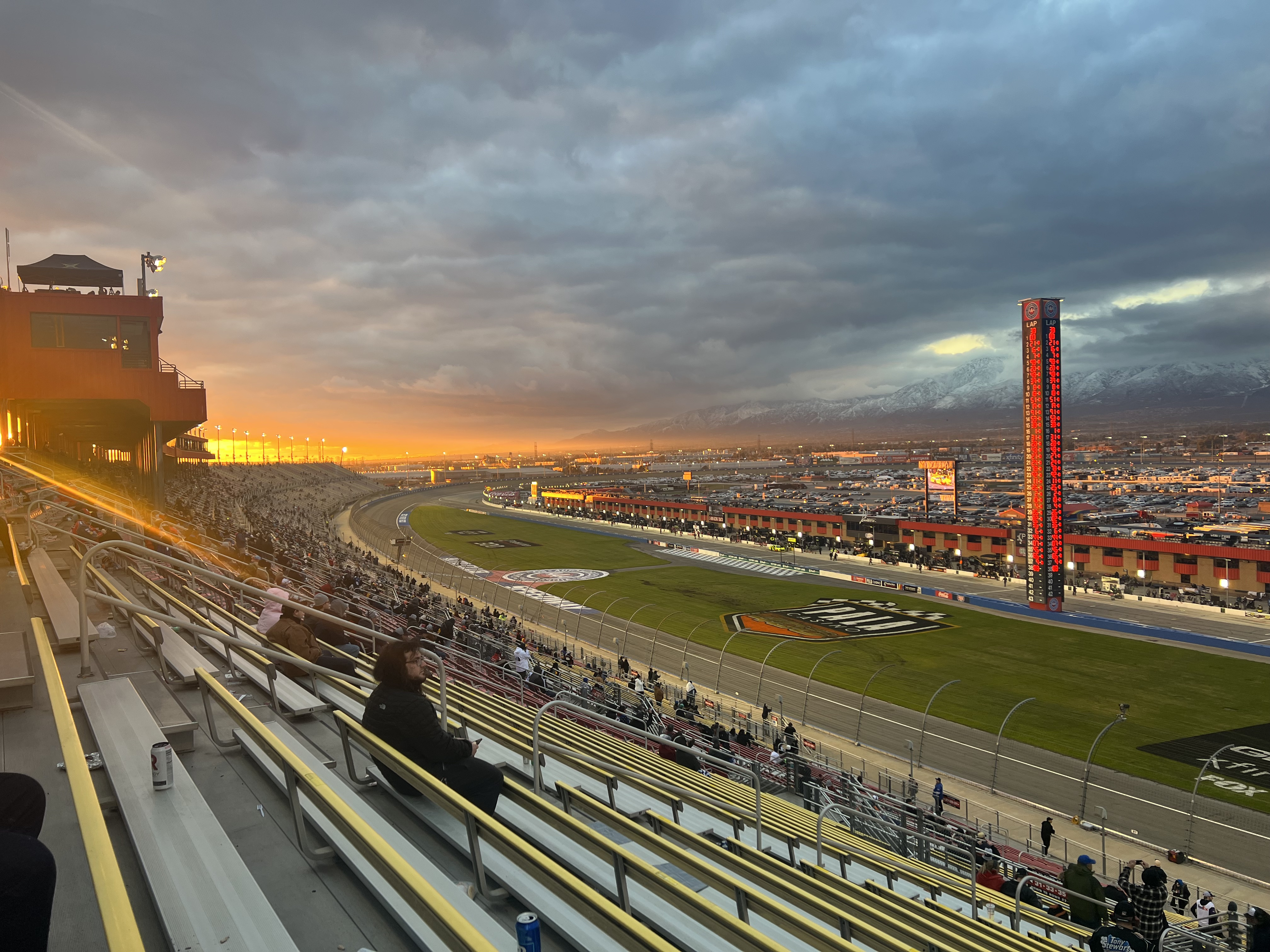
Auto Club Speedway, the track where the race was held.

Auto Club Speedway (previously California Speedway) was a two-mile (3.2 km), low-banked, D-shaped oval superspeedway in Fontana, California which hosted NASCAR racing annually from 1997 to 2023. It was also used for open wheel racing events. The racetrack was located near the former locations of Ontario Motor Speedway and Riverside International Raceway. The track was owned and operated by International Speedway Corporation and was the only track owned by ISC to have its naming rights sold. The speedway was served by the nearby Interstate 10 and Interstate 15 freeways as well as a Metrolink station located behind the backstretch.

== Entry list ==
Car	Driver	Make	Team
00	David Reutimann	Toyota	Michael Waltrip
1	Martin Truex Jr.	Chevrolet	Teresa Earnhardt
2	Kurt Busch	Dodge	Walter Czarnecki
5	Mark Martin	Chevrolet	Mary Hendrick
6	David Ragan	Ford	Mike Dee
07	Casey Mears	Chevrolet	Richard Childress
7	Robby Gordon	Toyota	Robby Gordon
8	Aric Almirola	Chevrolet	Chip Ganassi
09	Sterling Marlin	Dodge	James Finch
9	Kasey Kahne	Dodge	George Gillett Jr
11	Denny Hamlin	Toyota	J D Gibbs
12	David Stremme	Dodge	Roger Penske
14	Tony Stewart	Chevrolet	Margaret Haas
16	Greg Biffle	Ford	Jack Roush
17	Matt Kenseth	Ford	John Henry
18	Kyle Busch	Toyota	Joe Gibbs
19	Elliott Sadler	Dodge	George Gillett Jr
20	Joey Logano	Toyota	Joe Gibbs
24	Jeff Gordon	Chevrolet	Rick Hendrick
26	Jamie McMurray	Ford	Geoff Smith
28	Travis Kvapil	Ford	Jeff Moorad
29	Kevin Harvick	Chevrolet	Richard Childress
31	Jeff Burton	Chevrolet	Richard Childress
33	Clint Bowyer	Chevrolet	Bobby Ginn III
34	John Andretti	Chevrolet	Teresa Earnhardt
36	Scott Riggs	Toyota	Tommy Baldwin
37	Tony Raines	Dodge	Brad Jenkins
39	Ryan Newman	Chevrolet	Tony Stewart
41	Jeremy Mayfield	Toyota	Jeremy Mayfield
42	Juan Pablo Montoya	Chevrolet	Teresa Earnhardt
43	Reed Sorenson	Dodge	Richard Petty
44	A.J. Allmendinger	Dodge	George Gillett Jr
47	Marcos Ambrose	Toyota	Rob Kauffman
48	Jimmie Johnson	Chevrolet	Jeff Gordon
51	David Starr	Dodge	David Bean
55	Michael Waltrip	Toyota	Michael Waltrip
64	Todd Bodine	Toyota	Larry Gunselman
66	Dave Blaney	Toyota	Phil Parsons
71	David Gilliland	Chevrolet	Kevin Buckler
73	Mike Garvey	Dodge	Barry Haefele
77	Sam Hornish Jr.	Dodge	Bill Davis
82	Scott Speed	Toyota	Dietrich Mateschitz
83	Brian Vickers	Toyota	Dietrich Mateschitz
87	Joe Nemechek	Toyota	Andrea Nemechek
88	Dale Earnhardt Jr.	Chevrolet	Rick Hendrick
96	Bobby Labonte	Ford	Jeffrey Moorad
98	Paul Menard	Ford	Max Jones
99	Carl Edwards	Ford	Jack Roush

== Qualifying ==
Pos.	Car #	Driver	Make	Avg. Speed	Time	Behind
1	83	Brian Vickers	Toyota	183.439	39.250	0.000
2	48	Jimmie Johnson	Chevrolet	183.164	39.309	00.059
3	26	Jamie McMurray	Ford	182.653	39.419	00.169
4	2	Kurt Busch	Dodge	182.556	39.440	00.190
5	16	Greg Biffle	Ford	182.302	39.495	00.245
6	24	Jeff Gordon	Chevrolet	182.209	39.515	00.265
7	00	David Reutimann	Toyota	182.089	39.541	00.291
8	44	A.J. Allmendinger	Dodge	182.048	39.550	00.300
9	82	Scott Speed	Toyota	181.965	39.568	00.318
10	18	Kyle Busch	Toyota	181.919	39.578	00.328
11	14	Tony Stewart	Chevrolet	181.901	39.582	00.332
12	7	Robby Gordon	Toyota	181.777	39.609	00.359
13	6	David Ragan	Ford	181.726	39.620	00.370
14	47	Marcos Ambrose	Toyota	181.653	39.636	00.386
15	42	Juan Pablo Montoya	Chevrolet	181.616	39.644	00.394
16	96	Bobby Labonte	Ford	181.461	39.678	00.428
17	43	Reed Sorenson	Dodge	181.429	39.685	00.435
18	5	Mark Martin	Chevrolet	181.264	39.721	00.471
19	29	Kevin Harvick	Chevrolet	181.210	39.733	00.483
20	19	Elliott Sadler	Dodge	181.173	39.741	00.491
21	33	Clint Bowyer	Chevrolet	181.137	39.749	00.499
22	9	Kasey Kahne	Dodge	181.132	39.750	00.500
23	11	Denny Hamlin	Toyota	180.836	39.815	00.565
24	17	Matt Kenseth	Ford	180.818	39.819	00.569
25	99	Carl Edwards	Ford	180.773	39.829	00.579
26	77	Sam Hornish Jr.	Dodge	180.746	39.835	00.585
27	98	Paul Menard	Ford	180.610	39.865	00.615
28	39	Ryan Newman	Chevrolet	180.397	39.912	00.662
29	07	Casey Mears	Chevrolet	180.374	39.917	00.667
30	66	Dave Blaney	Toyota	180.320	39.929	00.679
31	8	Aric Almirola	Chevrolet	180.248	39.945	00.695
32	71	David Gilliland	Chevrolet	180.234	39.948	00.698
33	1	Martin Truex Jr.	Chevrolet	180.176	39.961	00.711
34	20	Joey Logano	Toyota	180.059	39.987	00.737
35	88	Dale Earnhardt Jr.	Chevrolet	179.991	40.002	00.752
36	36	Scott Riggs	Toyota	179.721	40.062	00.812
37	28	Travis Kvapil	Ford	179.632	40.082	00.832
38	12	David Stremme	Dodge	179.390	40.136	00.886
39	41	Jeremy Mayfield	Toyota	179.301	40.156	00.906
40	34	John Andretti	Chevrolet	179.287	40.159	00.909
41	31	Jeff Burton	Chevrolet	179.109	40.199	00.949
42	55	Michael Waltrip	Toyota	0.000	00.000	0.000
43	87	Joe Nemechek	Toyota	177.997	40.450	01.200
Failed to qualify
44	64	Todd Bodine	Toyota	177.454	40.574	
45	37	Tony Raines	Dodge	177.405	40.585	
46	51	David Starr	Dodge	177.122	40.650	
47	73	Mike Garvey	Dodge	175.897	40.933	
48	09	Sterling Marlin	Dodge	175.328	41.066	

== Race recap ==
Capitol Records Nashville recording artists Little Big Town performed the National Anthem and actor Hugh Laurie gave the command to start engines.

Brian Vickers (the polesitter), Michael Waltrip (42nd), David Reutimann (7th); Dale Earnhardt Jr. (35th), and Reed Sorenson (17th) started from the back due to changes in the engine and the transmissions.

Actress Angie Harmon waved the green flag as Jamie McMurray started in first place, but was passed by Jimmie Johnson on the backstretch for the lead. The first caution came out on lap 5; a light rain shower over turn 4. Ryan Newman's transponder was malfunctioning and had to go to pit road for repair. After leaving the pits. the left endplate of the rear spoiler on Newman's car fell off. Newman, again, came down pit road for repairs. Vickers reported his car's carburetor had stopped working a few times under caution. On lap 17, Earnhardt Jr.; Joey Logano, Dave Blaney and others stopped for fuel. The field restarted on lap 23 with Jimmie Johnson in the lead, followed by McMurray, Jeff Gordon and brothers Kurt and Kyle Busch.

Since the restart, in 13 laps, defending Daytona 500 winner Matt Kenseth moved up to 11th position from 20th position; David Ragan ran in 7th from the 19th position. Joe Nemechek made his way to pit road where his crew then pushed the car to the garage on lap 37. The second caution came out on lap 41 due to light rain. Drivers start their first round of pit stops; Ku. Busch and Jimmie Johnson switched positions for first and second, Ragan gained five positions, and teammate Kenseth gained 7 positions on pit road. Sorenson was too fast entering and exiting pit road, served a drive thru penalty. Restart on lap 47.

Johnson edged ahead of Ku. Busch to the start-finish line for the lead after the restart. Blaney entered pit road with no power on lap 50. Lap 67, Johnson continued to lead laps; Scott Riggs headed to the garage, becoming the third driver to do so after Blaney and Nemechek; he returned to the track, 8 laps down, in 41st. Gordon led his first lap in the race on lap 78. Drivers Casey Mears, Jeff Burton, John Andretti, Logano, Scott Speed, and Jeremy Mayfield went a lap down when Gordon took the lead. Lap 85, second round of pitstops. Teammates Greg Biffle and Carl Edwards each led a lap during the round of pitstops.

On lap 119, drivers began their third round of pitstops. Gordon remained the leader until Biffle's crew completed the pit stop quicker than Gordon's crew during the pitstop round; no pit road penalties were served. Biffle led an additional 13 laps until the yellow flag waved on lap 140 because of light rain; Michael Waltrip gets the 'lucky dog' free pass. Drivers entered pit road with Biffle in the lead. Kenseth gained three positions for the lead (4th to 1st), Biffle lost a position (1st to 2nd), Johnson lost two positions (4th to 6th), and Harvick gained two positions (12th to 10th) after completing their stops. Montoya stayed on the track and led a lap before he entered pit road.

The field restarted with Kenseth in the lead, Biffle in 2nd, Gordon in third, Ku. Busch in 4th, and Johnson in 5th on lap 151. Teammates Johnson and Gordon battled for 2nd as Kenseth pulled away and led laps. David Ragan, who stood in 19th and was a lap down, reported an overheating engine on lap 161. Speed entered pit road reporting with no power before the fourth caution on lap 169, again due to rain. Vickers, in 18th place, got the lucky dog free pass. Hendrick Motorsports drivers Johnson, Martin, Earnhardt Jr. reported problems on the same lap. In the fourth round of pitstops, Johnson gained 3 positions (5th to 2nd), Gordon lost a position (2nd to 3rd), Biffle lost three positions (6th to 9th), Hamlin gained one position (8th to 7th), Edwards lost three positions (7th to 10th). Robby Gordon was too fast exiting pit road; Robby Gordon was served a drive through penalty. Stewart stayed out as did Montoya, Martin, Stremme, and Reutimann. After leading three laps, Stewart and others entered the pits handing over the lead to Mark Martin before Martin entered pit road.

The field restarted with Kenseth, Johnson, Gordon, and brothers Kurt and Kyle Busch in the top five on lap 176. Earnhardt Jr. restarted in 17th after engine repairs. Mark Martin's engine blew out of turn 2 after the restart. Martin coasted the car to pit road; no caution. Running in 10th, Jaime McMurray reported concerns on his brakes on lap 189. Jeff Gordon and Matt Kenseth battled for the lead with 55 laps to go; Gordon retook the lead, leading lap 195. Kenseth, then, fell back to third behind teammate Greg Biffle. Earnhardt Jr. drove his car to the garage, like teammate Martin, because of engine problems on lap 206.

Harvick, running in 12th, lost the engine, hit and slid across the outside wall between turn one and two on lap 207, ending a streak of 81 races running at the finish. Fifth caution of the race; Kasey Kahne got the 'lucky dog' pass. During the pitstop round, Kenseth moved up two positions (3rd to 1st), Gordon lost a position (1st to 2nd), Hamlin and Kurt Busch gained two spots, Steward and Vickers moved up three spots, Biffle lost nine positions, and McMurray lost three positions. Biffle lost nine spots because he ran over the air hose. David Stremme stayed out and led three laps. Kenseth, Gordon, Kyle Busch, Hamlin, and Kurt Busch, in the top five, restart the field on lap 215. The drivers in the top five positions remained unchanged until lap 242 when Hamlin and Kurt Busch switched positions. Aric Almirola, a lap down, slowed on the backstretch; no caution. Kenseth held off a hard-charging Gordon for his 18th win.

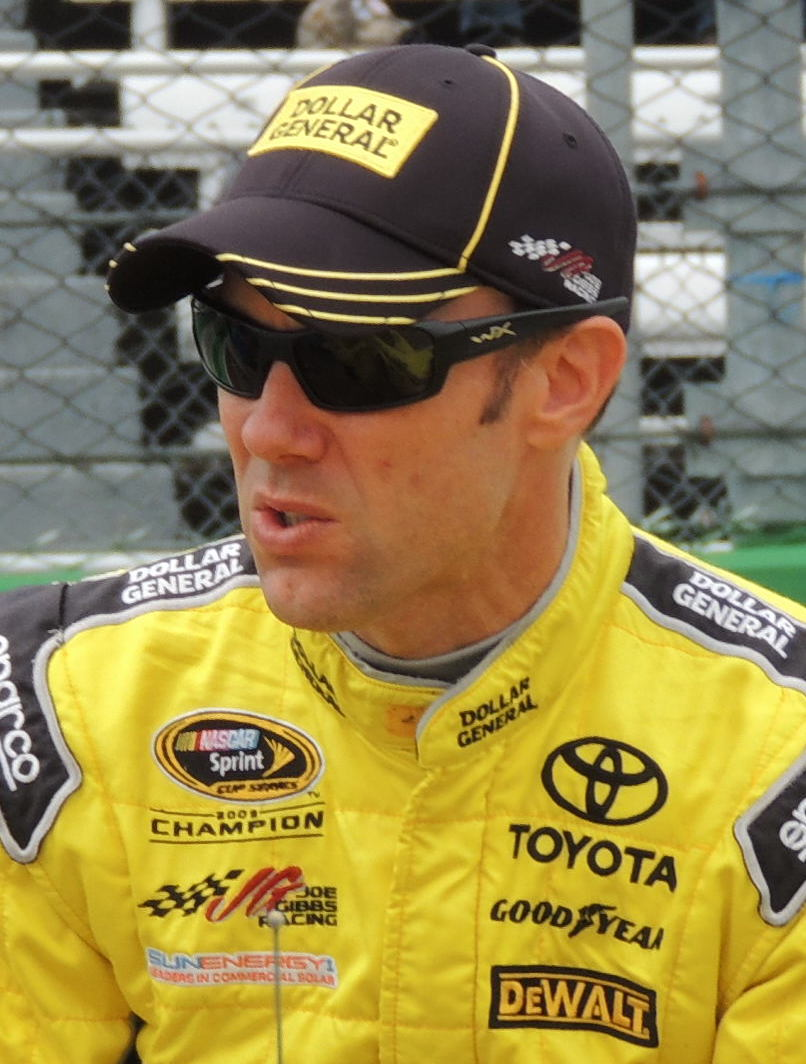
Matt Kenseth won the race.

Kenseth was the second driver to win the first two races in a season (Gordon in 1997) and the fourth driver to win both the Daytona 500 and the following race (Cale Yarborough in 1977, Richard Petty in 1973). Gordon, Ky. Busch, Biffle, and Ku. Busch made up the Top 5. Vickers, after starting from the back, finished in 10th place. Rookie Logano was in 26th place, a lap down. Earnhardt Jr., because of engine problems, was in 39th, 45 laps down, finishing ahead of teammate Martin who also had engine problems.

== Race results ==
Fin	St	#	Driver	Make	Laps	Led	Status	Pts
1	24	17	Matt Kenseth	Ford	250	84	running	195
2	6	24	Jeff Gordon	Chevy	250	64	running	175
3	10	18	Kyle Busch	Toyota	250	0	running	165
4	5	16	Greg Biffle	Ford	250	16	running	165
5	4	2	Kurt Busch	Dodge	250	2	running	160
6	23	11	Denny Hamlin	Toyota	250	0	running	150
7	25	99	Carl Edwards	Ford	250	1	running	151
8	11	14	Tony Stewart	Chevy	250	3	running	147
9	2	48	Jimmie Johnson	Chevy	250	74	running	143
10	1	83	Brian Vickers	Toyota	250	0	running	134
11	15	42	Juan Pablo Montoya	Chevy	250	1	running	135
12	22	9	Kasey Kahne	Dodge	250	0	running	127
13	38	12	David Stremme	Dodge	250	3	running	129
14	7	00	David Reutimann	Toyota	250	0	running	121
15	42	55	Michael Waltrip	Toyota	250	0	running	118
16	3	26	Jamie McMurray	Ford	250	0	running	115
17	13	6	David Ragan	Ford	249	0	running	112
18	37	28	Travis Kvapil	Ford	249	0	running	109
19	21	33	Clint Bowyer	Chevy	249	0	running	106
20	16	96	Bobby Labonte	Ford	249	0	running	103
21	17	43	Reed Sorenson	Dodge	249	0	running	100
22	14	47	Marcos Ambrose	Toyota	249	0	running	97
23	26	77	Sam Hornish Jr.	Dodge	249	0	running	94
24	29	07	Casey Mears	Chevy	249	0	running	91
25	20	19	Elliott Sadler	Dodge	249	0	running	88
26	34	20	Joey Logano	Toyota	249	0	running	85
27	33	1	Martin Truex Jr.	Chevy	249	0	running	82
28	28	39	Ryan Newman	Chevy	248	0	running	79
29	8	44	A.J. Allmendinger	Dodge	248	0	running	76
30	12	7	Robby Gordon	Toyota	248	0	running	73
31	40	34	John Andretti	Chevy	248	1	running	75
32	41	31	Jeff Burton	Chevy	247	0	running	67
33	32	71	David Gilliland	Chevy	246	0	running	64
34	39	41	Jeremy Mayfield	Toyota	245	0	running	61
35	31	8	Aric Almirola	Chevy	242	0	engine	58
36	36	36	Scott Riggs	Toyota	240	0	running	55
37	27	98	Paul Menard	Ford	221	0	running	52
38	19	29	Kevin Harvick	Chevy	207	0	crash	49
39	35	88	Dale Earnhardt Jr.	Chevy	205	0	engine	46
40	18	5	Mark Martin	Chevy	179	1	engine	48
41	9	82	Scott Speed	Toyota	172	0	engine	40
42	30	66	Dave Blaney	Toyota	50	0	fuel pump	37
43	43	87	Joe Nemechek	Toyota	36	0	fuel pump	34
Failed to qualify
44		64	Todd Bodine	Toyota				
45		37	Tony Raines	Dodge				
46		51	David Starr	Dodge				
47		73	Mike Garvey	Dodge				
48		09	Sterling Marlin	Dodge				

== Point standings after the race ==
Jeff Gordon jumped 10 positions in the standings from 12th to 2nd. Greg Biffle moved from 20th to 5th . Carl Edwards was in 9th from 18th. Kyle Busch moved up 20 positions from 38th to 18th. Jimmie Johnson was in 19th from 31st. Brian Vickers moved up 14 spots from 40th. Travis Kvapil, was in 30th from 42nd.

Elliott Sadler dropped 6 spots from 5th. A.J. Allmendinger lost 10 positions from 3rd. Kevin Harvick dropped from 2nd to 16th. Martin Truex Jr. dropped 7 positions to 17th. Mark Martin lost 12 spots from 15th to 27th. Dale Earnhardt Jr. lost 9 spots from the 26th place in the point standings.

Previous race: 2009 Daytona 500	Sprint Cup Series; 2009 season	Next race: 2009 Shelby 427
