= 2009 LifeLock 400 =

Race details
- Race 15 of 36 in the 2009 NASCAR Sprint Cup Series season
- The 2009 LifeLock 400 program cover.
- Date: June 14, 2009
- Official name: LifeLock 400
- Location: Michigan International Speedway, Brooklyn, Michigan
- Course: Permanent racing facility
- Course length: 2.0 miles (3.218 km)
- Distance: 200 laps, 400 mi (643.737 km)
- Weather: Temperatures reaching up to 77 °F (25 °C); wind speeds up to 6 miles per hour (9.7 km/h)
- Average speed: 155.491 miles per hour (250.239 km/h)

Pole position
Driver	Brian Vickers	Red Bull Racing Team
- Time: 38.073

Most laps led
Driver	Jimmie Johnson	Hendrick Motorsports
- Laps: 146

Winner
No. 5	Mark Martin	Hendrick Motorsports

Television in the United States
- Network: TNT
- Announcers: Bill Weber, Kyle Petty and Wally Dallenbach Jr.

The 2009 LifeLock 400 was the fifteenth points race in the 2009 NASCAR Sprint Cup schedule. Held on Sunday, June 14 at Michigan International Speedway in Brooklyn, Michigan, it was the first of two races sponsored by the internet protection service LifeLock, the other being the LifeLock.com 400 at Chicagoland Speedway on July 11.

== Background ==
=== Entry list ===
No.	Driver	Team	Make
00	David Reutimann	Michael Waltrip Racing	Toyota
1	Martin Truex Jr.	Earnhardt Ganassi Racing	Chevrolet
2	Kurt Busch	Penske Racing	Dodge
5	Mark Martin	Hendrick Motorsports	Chevrolet
6	David Ragan	Roush Fenway Racing	Ford
7	Robby Gordon	Robby Gordon Motorsports	Ford
07	Casey Mears	Richard Childress Racing	Chevrolet
9	Kasey Kahne	Richard Petty Motorsports	Dodge
09	Sterling Marlin	Phoenix Racing	Chevrolet
11	Denny Hamlin	Joe Gibbs Racing	Toyota
12	David Stremme	Penske Racing	Dodge
13	Max Papis	Germain Racing	Toyota
14	Tony Stewart	Stewart–Haas Racing	Chevrolet
16	Greg Biffle	Roush Fenway Racing	Ford
17	Matt Kenseth	Roush Fenway Racing	Ford
18	Kyle Busch	Joe Gibbs Racing	Toyota
19	Elliott Sadler	Richard Petty Motorsports	Dodge
20	Joey Logano	Joe Gibbs Racing	Toyota
21	Bill Elliott	Wood Brothers Racing	Ford
24	Jeff Gordon	Hendrick Motorsports	Chevrolet
26	Jamie McMurray	Roush Fenway Racing	Ford
29	Kevin Harvick	Richard Childress Racing	Chevrolet
31	Jeff Burton	Richard Childress Racing	Chevrolet
33	Clint Bowyer	Richard Childress Racing	Chevrolet
34	John Andretti	Front Row Motorsports	Chevrolet
36	Mike Skinner	Tommy Baldwin Racing	Chevrolet
37	Tony Raines	Front Row Motorsports	Chevrolet
39	Ryan Newman	Stewart–Haas Racing	Chevrolet
42	Juan Pablo Montoya	Earnhardt Ganassi Racing	Chevrolet
43	Reed Sorenson	Richard Petty Motorsports	Dodge
44	A.J. Allmendinger	Richard Petty Motorsports	Dodge
47	Marcos Ambrose	JTG Daugherty Racing	Toyota
48	Jimmie Johnson	Hendrick Motorsports	Chevrolet
55	Michael Waltrip	Michael Waltrip Racing	Toyota
66	Dave Blaney	Prism Motorsports	Toyota
71	David Gilliland	TRG Motorsports	Chevrolet
77	Sam Hornish Jr.	Penske Racing	Dodge
82	Scott Speed	Red Bull Racing Team	Toyota
83	Brian Vickers	Red Bull Racing Team	Toyota
87	Joe Nemechek	NEMCO Motorsports	Toyota
88	Dale Earnhardt Jr.	Hendrick Motorsports	Chevrolet
96	Bobby Labonte	Hall of Fame Racing	Ford
98	Paul Menard	Yates Racing	Ford
99	Carl Edwards	Roush Fenway Racing	Ford

== Qualifying ==
Pos.	No.	Driver	Make	Team	Time	Avg. Speed (mph)
1	83	Brian Vickers	Toyota	Red Bull Racing Team	38.073	189.110
2	18	Kyle Busch	Toyota	Joe Gibbs Racing	38.189	188.536
3	48	Jimmie Johnson	Chevrolet	Hendrick Motorsports	38.237	188.299
4	00	David Reutimann	Toyota	Michael Waltrip Racing	38.270	188.137
5	2	Kurt Busch	Dodge	Penske Racing	38.308	187.950
6	44	A.J. Allmendinger	Dodge	Richard Petty Motorsports	38.320	187.891
7	42	Juan Pablo Montoya	Chevrolet	Earnhardt Ganassi Racing	38.363	187.681
8	9	Kasey Kahne	Dodge	Richard Petty Motorsports	38.419	187.407
9	33	Clint Bowyer	Chevrolet	Richard Childress Racing	38.437	187.320
10	34	John Andretti	Chevrolet	Front Row Motorsports	38.451	187.251
11	14	Tony Stewart	Chevrolet	Stewart–Haas Racing	38.482	187.100
12	29	Kevin Harvick	Chevrolet	Richard Childress Racing	38.489	187.066
13	7	Robby Gordon	Toyota	Robby Gordon Motorsports	38.489	187.066
14	11	Denny Hamlin	Toyota	Joe Gibbs Racing	38.490	187.062
15	21	Bill Elliott	Ford	Wood Brothers Racing	38.521	186.911
16	17	Matt Kenseth	Ford	Roush Fenway Racing	38.527	186.882
17	96	Bobby Labonte	Ford	Hall of Fame Racing	38.542	186.809
18	39	Ryan Newman	Chevrolet	Stewart–Haas Racing	38.559	186.727
19	1	Martin Truex Jr.	Chevrolet	Earnhardt Ganassi Racing	38.578	186.635
20	16	Greg Biffle	Ford	Roush Fenway Racing	38.589	186.582
21	82	Scott Speed	Toyota	Red Bull Racing Team	38.599	186.533
22	31	Jeff Burton	Chevrolet	Richard Childress Racing	38.604	186.509
23	6	David Ragan	Ford	Roush Fenway Racing	38.617	186.446
24	20	Joey Logano	Toyota	Joe Gibbs Racing	38.621	186.427
25	19	Elliott Sadler	Dodge	Richard Petty Motorsports	38.650	186.287
26	12	David Stremme	Dodge	Penske Racing	38.651	186.282
27	24	Jeff Gordon	Chevrolet	Hendrick Motorsports	38.662	186.229
28	43	Reed Sorenson	Dodge	Richard Petty Motorsports	38.667	186.205
29	99	Carl Edwards	Ford	Roush Fenway Racing	38.700	186.047
30	88	Dale Earnhardt Jr.	Chevrolet	Hendrick Motorsports	38.709	186.003
31	26	Jamie McMurray	Ford	Roush Fenway Racing	38.738	185.864
32	5	Mark Martin	Chevrolet	Hendrick Motorsports	38.740	185.854
33	47	Marcos Ambrose	Toyota	JTG Daugherty Racing	38.754	185.787
34	77	Sam Hornish Jr.	Dodge	Penske Racing	38.754	185.787
35	71	David Gilliland	Chevrolet	TRG Motorsports	38.801	185.562
36	55	Michael Waltrip	Toyota	Michael Waltrip Racing	38.815	185.495
37	07	Casey Mears	Chevrolet	Richard Childress Racing	38.886	185.157
38	98	Paul Menard	Ford	Yates Racing	38.899	185.095
39	66	Dave Blaney	Toyota	Prism Motorsports	38.931	184.943
40	87	Joe Nemechek	Toyota	NEMCO Motorsports	38.945	184.876
41	37	Tony Raines	Dodge	Front Row Motorsports	39.017	184.535
42	09	Sterling Marlin	Dodge	Phoenix Racing	39.037	184.440
43	13	Max Papis	Toyota	Germain Racing	39.267	183.360
Failed to qualify
44	36	Mike Skinner	Toyota	Tommy Baldwin Racing	39.339	183.024

== Results ==
Finish	No.	Driver	Make	Team	Laps	Led	Status	Pts	Winnings
1	5	Mark Martin	Chevrolet	Hendrick Motorsports	200	1	running	190	$189,125
2	24	Jeff Gordon	Chevrolet	Hendrick Motorsports	200	0	running	170	$159,576
3	11	Denny Hamlin	Toyota	Joe Gibbs Racing	200	1	running	170	$125,625
4	99	Carl Edwards	Ford	Roush Fenway Racing	200	1	running	165	$148,156
5	16	Greg Biffle	Ford	Roush Fenway Racing	200	42	running	160	$118,200
6	42	Juan Pablo Montoya	Chevrolet	Earnhardt Ganassi Racing	200	0	running	150	$136,173
7	14	Tony Stewart	Chevrolet	Stewart–Haas Racing	200	0	running	146	$109,923
8	2	Kurt Busch	Dodge	Penske Racing	200	0	running	142	$101,150
9	83	Brian Vickers	Toyota	Red Bull Racing Team	200	0	running	138	$120,273
10	33	Clint Bowyer	Chevrolet	Richard Childress Racing	200	0	running	134	$96,250
11	26	Jamie McMurray	Ford	Roush Fenway Racing	200	0	running	130	$93,100
12	19	Elliott Sadler	Dodge	Richard Petty Motorsports	200	0	running	127	$91,925
13	18	Kyle Busch	Toyota	Joe Gibbs Racing	200	9	running	129	$140,098
14	88	Dale Earnhardt Jr.	Chevrolet	Hendrick Motorsports	200	0	running	121	$96,725
15	6	David Ragan	Ford	Roush Fenway Racing	200	0	running	118	$91,675
16	21	Bill Elliott	Ford	Wood Brothers Racing	200	0	running	115	$78,175
17	7	Robby Gordon	Toyota	Robby Gordon Motorsports	200	0	running	112	$99,985
18	29	Kevin Harvick	Chevrolet	Richard Childress Racing	200	0	running	109	$118,178
19	00	David Reutimann	Toyota	Michael Waltrip Racing	200	0	running	106	$105,348
20	17	Matt Kenseth	Ford	Roush Fenway Racing	200	0	running	103	$124,590
21	9	Kasey Kahne	Dodge	Richard Petty Motorsports	200	0	running	100	$118,748
22	48	Jimmie Johnson	Chevrolet	Hendrick Motorsports	200	146	running	107	$130,751
23	39	Ryan Newman	Chevrolet	Stewart–Haas Racing	199	0	running	94	$107,829
24	07	Casey Mears	Chevrolet	Richard Childress Racing	199	0	running	91	$93,650
25	20	Joey Logano	Toyota	Joe Gibbs Racing	199	0	running	88	$124,776
26	31	Jeff Burton	Chevrolet	Richard Childress Racing	199	0	running	85	$121,981
27	43	Reed Sorenson	Dodge	Richard Petty Motorsports	199	0	running	82	$115,626
28	96	Bobby Labonte	Ford	Hall of Fame Racing	199	0	running	79	$105,654
29	77	Sam Hornish Jr.	Dodge	Penske Racing	198	0	running	76	$96,485
30	55	Michael Waltrip	Toyota	Michael Waltrip Racing	198	0	running	73	$86,050
31	47	Marcos Ambrose	Toyota	JTG Daugherty Racing	198	0	running	70	$92,973
32	71	David Gilliland	Chevrolet	TRG Motorsports	198	0	running	67	$76,800
33	34	John Andretti	Chevrolet	Front Row Motorsports	198	0	running	64	$83,175
34	98	Paul Menard	Ford	Yates Racing	197	0	running	61	$104,531
35	13	Max Papis	Toyota	Germain Racing	193	0	running	58	$73,975
36	1	Martin Truex Jr.	Chevrolet	Earnhardt Ganassi Racing	192	0	running	55	$108,915
37	82	Scott Speed	Toyota	Red Bull Racing Team	174	0	running	52	$85,948
38	12	David Stremme	Dodge	Penske Racing	159	0	crash	49	$106,280
39	44	A.J. Allmendinger	Dodge	Richard Petty Motorsports	144	0	running	46	$73,740
40	66	Dave Blaney	Toyota	Prism Motorsports	23	0	engine	43	$73,700
41	09	Sterling Marlin	Dodge	Phoenix Racing	23	0	electrical	40	$73,665
42	87	Joe Nemechek	Toyota	NEMCO Motorsports	20	0	electrical	37	$73,620
43	37	Tony Raines	Dodge	Front Row Motorsports	17	0	electrical	34	$73,226
