= 2008 NASCAR Sprint All-Star Race =

24th iteration of the NASCAR All-Star Race

The Sprint Showdown and Sprint All-Star Race XXIV were run on Saturday, May 17, 2008, at Lowe's Motor Speedway in Concord, North Carolina, a suburb outside of Charlotte. The events were telecast live at 7 pm US EDT on Speed Channel with radio broadcast on MRN Radio and Sirius Satellite Radio beginning at 6:15 pm US EDT.

The All-Star Race is an annual race that involves winners of the entire 2007 and 2008 NASCAR Sprint Cup Series races (known as the Nextel Cup Series in 2007) through the Dodge Challenger 500, either as a driver or team owner, and also includes past championship drivers of the Winston/Nextel Cup series from 1998 through 2007, as well as winning drivers from 2000 to 2007, known through this period as either "The Winston" or the "Nextel All-Star Challenge".

== Eligible 2008 drivers ==
NOTE: Only the driver's first accomplishment is listed, as most of those drivers listed have attained more than one of the previously mentioned accomplishments to qualify. All former All-Star Race winners are referenced by the current use of the Roman Numeral designation. For example, Ryan Newman won All-Star Race XVIII, but he also won the 2008 Daytona 500. Sprint Cup champions of the past ten years, winners of Sprint All-Star Races XIV through XXIII, and all race winners (driver and owner) from the 2007 Daytona 500 through the 2008 Dodge Challenger 500 have exemptions into the race, as will the top two finishing drivers in the Sprint Showdown as well as the fan vote winner from said Showdown.

The following drivers were eligible:

No.	Driver	Entry Win/Championship
44	Dale Jarrett+	1999 Champion
43	Bobby Labonte	2000 Champion
24	Jeff Gordon	Four-Time Series Champion, most recently 2001
17	Matt Kenseth	2003 Champion
2	Kurt Busch	2004 Champion
20	Tony Stewart	Two-Time Series Champion, most recently 2005
48	Jimmie Johnson	Two-Time Series Champion, most recently 2007
88	Dale Earnhardt Jr.^{§}	2000 The Winston
12	Ryan Newman	2002 The Winston
8	Mark Martin^{§}	2005 Nextel All-Star Challenge
26	Jamie McMurray	2007 Pepsi 400
29	Kevin Harvick^{≠}	2007 Daytona 500
18	Kyle Busch^{±}	2007 Food City 500
5	Casey Mears^{±}	2007 Coca-Cola 600
31	Jeff Burton	2007 Samsung 500
1	Martin Truex Jr.	2007 Autism Speaks 400 presented by Visa
99	Carl Edwards	2007 Citizens Bank 400
42	Juan Pablo Montoya	2007 Toyota/Save Mart 350
11	Denny Hamlin	2007 Lenox Industrial Tools 300
07	Clint Bowyer	2007 Sylvania 300
16	Greg Biffle	2007 LifeLock 400

+ – Dale Jarrett is retiring after the 2008 Food City 500 marking his final driving appearance.

§ – Dale Earnhardt Jr. is eligible as a past All-Star Race winner as a driver, while the No. 8 team is also eligible as Mark Martin, a past All-Star Race winner, is scheduled to drive in this race.

± – Kyle Busch and Casey Mears are eligible as both won races in 2007 for different teams. Kyle Busch won the 2007 Food City 500 as the driver of the No. 5 team, while Mears won the 2007 Coca-Cola 600 with the No. 25 team (now the No. 88 team). Kyle Busch's No. 18 team won the 2008 Kobalt Tools 500 and 2008 Aaron's 499 and is eligible for the 2009 race as well.

≠ – Sprint All-Star Race XXIII Champion.

== Entry list ==
=== Showdown ===
#	Driver	Team	Make
00	David Reutimann	Michael Waltrip Racing	Toyota
01	Regan Smith (R)	Dale Earnhardt Inc.	Chevrolet
6	David Ragan	Roush Fenway Racing	Ford
7	Robby Gordon	Robby Gordon Motorsports	Dodge
08	Tony Raines	E&M Motorsports	Dodge
9	Kasey Kahne	Gillett Evernham Motorsports	Dodge
10	Patrick Carpentier (R)	Gillett Evernham Motorsports	Dodge
15	Paul Menard	Dale Earnhardt Inc.	Chevrolet
19	Elliott Sadler	Gillett Evernham Motorsports	Dodge
21	Bill Elliott	Wood Brothers Racing	Ford
22	Dave Blaney	Bill Davis Racing	Toyota
28	Travis Kvapil	Yates Racing	Ford
34	Jeff Green	Front Row Motorsports	Chevrolet
37	Kenny Wallace	Front Row Motorsports	Chevrolet
38	David Gilliland	Yates Racing	Ford
41	Reed Sorenson	Chip Ganassi Racing	Dodge
45	Kyle Petty	Petty Enterprises	Dodge
46	Carl Long	Carl Long Racing	Dodge
49	Chad McCumbee	Petty Enterprises	Dodge
50	Stanton Barrett	SKI Motorsports	Chevrolet
55	Michael Waltrip	Michael Waltrip Racing	Toyota
66	Scott Riggs	Haas CNC Racing	Chevrolet
70	Johnny Sauter	Haas CNC Racing	Chevrolet
77	Sam Hornish Jr. (R)	Penske Racing South	Dodge
78	Joe Nemechek	Furniture Row Racing	Chevrolet
83	Brian Vickers	Team Red Bull	Toyota
84	A. J. Allmendinger	Team Red Bull	Toyota
96	J. J. Yeley	Hall of Fame Racing	Toyota

=== All-Star Race ===
#	Driver	Team	Make
1	Martin Truex Jr.	Dale Earnhardt Inc.	Chevrolet
2	Kurt Busch	Penske Racing South	Dodge
5	Casey Mears	Hendrick Motorsports	Chevrolet
07	Clint Bowyer	Richard Childress Racing	Chevrolet
8	Mark Martin	Dale Earnhardt Inc.	Chevrolet
11	Denny Hamlin	Joe Gibbs Racing	Toyota
12	Ryan Newman	Penske Racing South	Dodge
16	Greg Biffle	Roush Fenway Racing	Ford
17	Matt Kenseth	Roush Fenway Racing	Ford
18	Kyle Busch	Joe Gibbs Racing	Toyota
20	Tony Stewart	Joe Gibbs Racing	Toyota
24	Jeff Gordon	Hendrick Motorsports	Chevrolet
26	Jamie McMurray	Roush Fenway Racing	Ford
29	Kevin Harvick	Richard Childress Racing	Chevrolet
31	Jeff Burton	Richard Childress Racing	Chevrolet
42	Juan Pablo Montoya	Chip Ganassi Racing	Dodge
43	Bobby Labonte	Petty Enterprises	Dodge
44	Dale Jarrett	Michael Waltrip Racing	Toyota
48	Jimmie Johnson	Hendrick Motorsports	Chevrolet
88	Dale Earnhardt Jr.	Hendrick Motorsports	Chevrolet
99	Carl Edwards	Roush Fenway Racing	Ford

== Race format ==
=== Sprint Showdown ===
The teams that had not qualified for the All-Star Race were in a 40-lap race divided into two "halves" (two 20-lap segments) with a five lap break to allow for teams to have the option to make a pit stop. The top two drivers from this race, along with a fan ballot that selected the third (from the internet, Sprint cellular phone subscribers, Sprint retail locations, and on-site fan voting up to that night) among those on the lead lap and in the Top 50 in driver points will qualify for the main event. The cell phone votes counted double those of the other methods. Qualifying was the standard NASCAR two-lap event, with the fastest lap counting, and Elliott Sadler winning said pole. However, during the first segment, Sadler was knocked out of the race when A. J. Allmendinger bumped him high into the Turn Two wall, and Allmendinger and Sam Hornish Jr. automatically qualified, while Kasey Kahne won the fan vote.

=== Sprint All-Star Race XXIV ===
The race format of four "quarters" (like football or professional basketball) was slightly modified this season. In Sprint All-Star Race XXIII, the quarters were 20 laps each. This year, as announced at NASCAR's Media Tour, five laps were added to each segment to have a total of 100 laps (or four 25-lap quarters) in the race. The remainder of the race format, adopted the previous year, went unchanged. Qualifying for this race was a three lap cumulative timed event with a mandatory four tire pit stop arriving at the pit road speed of 45 MPH but leaving as full throttle after either the first or second qualifying lap. Kyle Busch took advantage of numerous miscues by others (including penalties for speed violations or loose lug nuts) to win the pole position. Kasey Kahne became the first to qualify from the fan vote to win, only taking a splash of gas to dominate the final quarter which, along with the rest of the race, went caution-free.

== Qualifying ==
=== Showdown ===
Pos.	#	Driver	Team	Make
1	19	Elliott Sadler	Gillett Evernham Motorsports	Dodge
2	83	Brian Vickers	Team Red Bull	Toyota
3	6	David Ragan	Roush Fenway Racing	Ford
4	84	A. J. Allmendinger	Team Red Bull	Toyota
5	7	Robby Gordon	Robby Gordon Motorsports	Dodge
6	22	Dave Blaney	Bill Davis Racing	Toyota
7	78	Joe Nemechek	Front Row Motorsports	Chevrolet
8	77	Sam Hornish Jr. (R)	Penske Racing South	Dodge
9	66	Scott Riggs	Haas CNC Racing	Chevrolet
10	28	Travis Kvapil	Yates Racing	Ford
11	70	Johnny Sauter	Haas CNC Racing	Chevrolet
12	15	Paul Menard	Dale Earnhardt Inc.	Chevrolet
13	41	Reed Sorenson	Chip Ganassi Racing	Dodge
14	55	Michael Waltrip	Michael Waltrip Racing	Toyota
15	9	Kasey Kahne	Gillett Evernham Motorsports	Dodge
16	38	David Gilliland	Yates Racing	Ford
17	00	David Reutimann	Michael Waltrip Racing	Toyota
18	49	Chad McCumbee	Petty Enterprises	Dodge
19	50	Stanton Barrett	SKI Motorsports	Chevrolet
20	96	J. J. Yeley	Hall of Fame Racing	Toyota
21	21	Bill Elliott	Wood Brothers Racing	Ford
22	45	Kyle Petty	Petty Enterprises	Dodge
23	01	Regan Smith (R)	Dale Earnhardt Inc.	Chevrolet
24	08	Tony Raines	E&M Motorsports	Dodge
25	34	Jeff Green	Front Row Motorsports	Chevrolet
26	46	Carl Long	Carl Long Racing	Dodge
27	10	Patrick Carpentier (R)	Gillett Evernham Motorsports	Dodge
Withdrew
WD	37	Kenny Wallace	Front Row Motorsports	Chevrolet

=== All-Star Race ===
Pos.	#	Driver	Team	Make
1	18	Kyle Busch	Joe Gibbs Racing	Toyota
2	24	Jeff Gordon	Hendrick Motorsports	Chevrolet
3	2	Kurt Busch	Penske Racing South	Dodge
4	1	Martin Truex Jr.	Dale Earnhardt Inc.	Chevrolet
5	16	Greg Biffle	Roush Fenway Racing	Ford
6	26	Jamie McMurray	Roush Fenway Racing	Ford
7	31	Jeff Burton	Richard Childress Racing	Chevrolet
8	12	Ryan Newman	Penske Racing South	Dodge
9	07	Clint Bowyer	Richard Childress Racing	Chevrolet
10	43	Bobby Labonte	Petty Enterprises	Dodge
11	88	Dale Earnhardt Jr.	Hendrick Motorsports	Chevrolet
12	20	Tony Stewart	Joe Gibbs Racing	Chevrolet
13	8	Mark Martin	Dale Earnhardt Inc.	Chevrolet
14	17	Matt Kenseth	Roush Fenway Racing	Ford
15	42	Juan Pablo Montoya	Chip Ganassi Racing	Dodge
16	29	Kevin Harvick	Richard Childress Racing	Chevrolet
17	5	Casey Mears	Hendrick Motorsports	Chevrolet
18	44	Dale Jarrett	Michael Waltrip Racing	Toyota
19	99	Carl Edwards	Roush Fenway Racing	Ford
20	11	Denny Hamlin	Joe Gibbs Racing	Toyota
21	48	Jimmie Johnson	Hendrick Motorsports	Chevrolet
22	84	A. J. Allmendinger*	Team Red Bull	Toyota
23	77	Sam Hornish Jr. (R)*	Penske Racing South	Dodge
24	9	Kasey Kahne**	Gillett Evernham Motorsports	Dodge

* - Finished top two in the Showdown

** - Fan vote winner

== Race results ==
=== Showdown ===
Pos.	#	Driver	Team	Make	Laps	Led	Status
1	84	A. J. Allmendinger	Team Red Bull	Toyota	40	21	running
2	77	Sam Hornish Jr. (R)	Penske Racing South	Dodge	40	0	running
3	6	David Ragan	Roush Fenway Racing	Ford	40	0	running
4	83	Brian Vickers	Team Red Bull	Toyota	40	19	running
5	9	Kasey Kahne	Gillett Evernham Motorsports	Dodge	40	0	running
6	00	David Reutimann	Michael Waltrip Racing	Toyota	40	0	running
7	38	David Gilliland	Yates Racing	Ford	40	0	running
8	28	Travis Kvapil	Yates Racing	Ford	40	0	running
9	96	J. J. Yeley	Hall of Fame Racing	Toyota	40	0	running
10	22	Dave Blaney	Bill Davis Racing	Toyota	40	0	running
11	7	Robby Gordon	Robby Gordon Motorsports	Dodge	40	0	running
12	41	Reed Sorenson	Chip Ganassi Racing	Dodge	40	0	running
13	49	Chad McCumbee	Petty Enterprises	Dodge	40	0	running
14	66	Scott Riggs	Haas CNC Racing	Chevrolet	40	0	running
15	45	Kyle Petty	Petty Enterprises	Dodge	40	0	running
16	15	Paul Menard	Dale Earnhardt Inc.	Chevrolet	40	0	running
17	78	Joe Nemechek	Furniture Row Racing	Chevrolet	40	0	running
18	34	Jeff Green	Front Row Motorsports	Chevrolet	40	0	running
19	21	Bill Elliott	Wood Brothers Racing	Ford	40	0	running
20	55	Michael Waltrip	Michael Waltrip Racing	Toyota	40	0	running
21	01	Regan Smith (R)	Dale Earnhardt Inc.	Chevrolet	40	0	running
22	46	Carl Long	Carl Long Racing	Dodge	40	0	running
23	08	Tony Raines	E&M Motorsports	Dodge	29	0	running
24	70	Johnny Sauter	Haas CNC Racing	Chevrolet	27	0	crash
25	50	Stanton Barrett	SKI Motorsports	Chevrolet	14	0	vibration
26	19	Elliott Sadler	Gillett Evernham Motorsports	Dodge	6	0	crash
27	10	Patrick Carpentier (R)	Gillett Evernham Motorsports	Dodge	2	0	crash

=== All-Star Race ===
Pos.	#	Driver	Team	Make	Laps	Led	Status
1	9	Kasey Kahne	Gillett Evernham Motorsports	Dodge	100	17	running
2	16	Greg Biffle	Roush Fenway Racing	Ford	100	11	running
3	17	Matt Kenseth	Roush Fenway Racing	Ford	100	0	running
4	48	Jimmie Johnson	Hendrick Motorsports	Chevrolet	100	1	running
5	20	Tony Stewart	Joe Gibbs Racing	Toyota	100	0	running
6	12	Ryan Newman	Penske Racing South	Dodge	100	0	running
7	77	Sam Hornish Jr. (R)	Penske Racing South	Dodge	100	0	running
8	88	Dale Earnhardt Jr.	Hendrick Motorsports	Chevrolet	100	14	running
9	8	Mark Martin	Dale Earnhardt Inc.	Chevrolet	100	0	running
10	99	Carl Edwards	Roush Fenway Racing	Ford	100	12	running
11	29	Kevin Harvick	Richard Childress Racing	Chevrolet	100	0	running
12	43	Bobby Labonte	Petty Enterprises	Dodge	100	0	running
13	5	Casey Mears	Hendrick Motorsports	Chevrolet	100	0	running
14	42	Juan Pablo Montoya	Chip Ganassi Racing	Dodge	100	0	running
15	24	Jeff Gordon	Hendrick Motorsports	Chevrolet	100	0	running
16	1	Martin Truex Jr.	Dale Earnhardt Inc.	Chevrolet	100	0	running
17	84	A. J. Allmendinger	Team Red Bull	Toyota	100	0	running
18	07	Clint Bowyer	Richard Childress Racing	Chevrolet	100	0	running
19	26	Jamie McMurray	Roush Fenway Racing	Ford	100	0	running
20	31	Jeff Burton	Richard Childress Racing	Chevrolet	100	0	running
21	44	Dale Jarrett	Michael Waltrip Racing	Toyota	100	0	running
22	2	Kurt Busch	Penske Racing South	Dodge	100	0	running
23	11	Denny Hamlin	Joe Gibbs Racing	Toyota	84	7	engine
24	18	Kyle Busch	Joe Gibbs Racing	Toyota	50	38	engine

== Other events ==
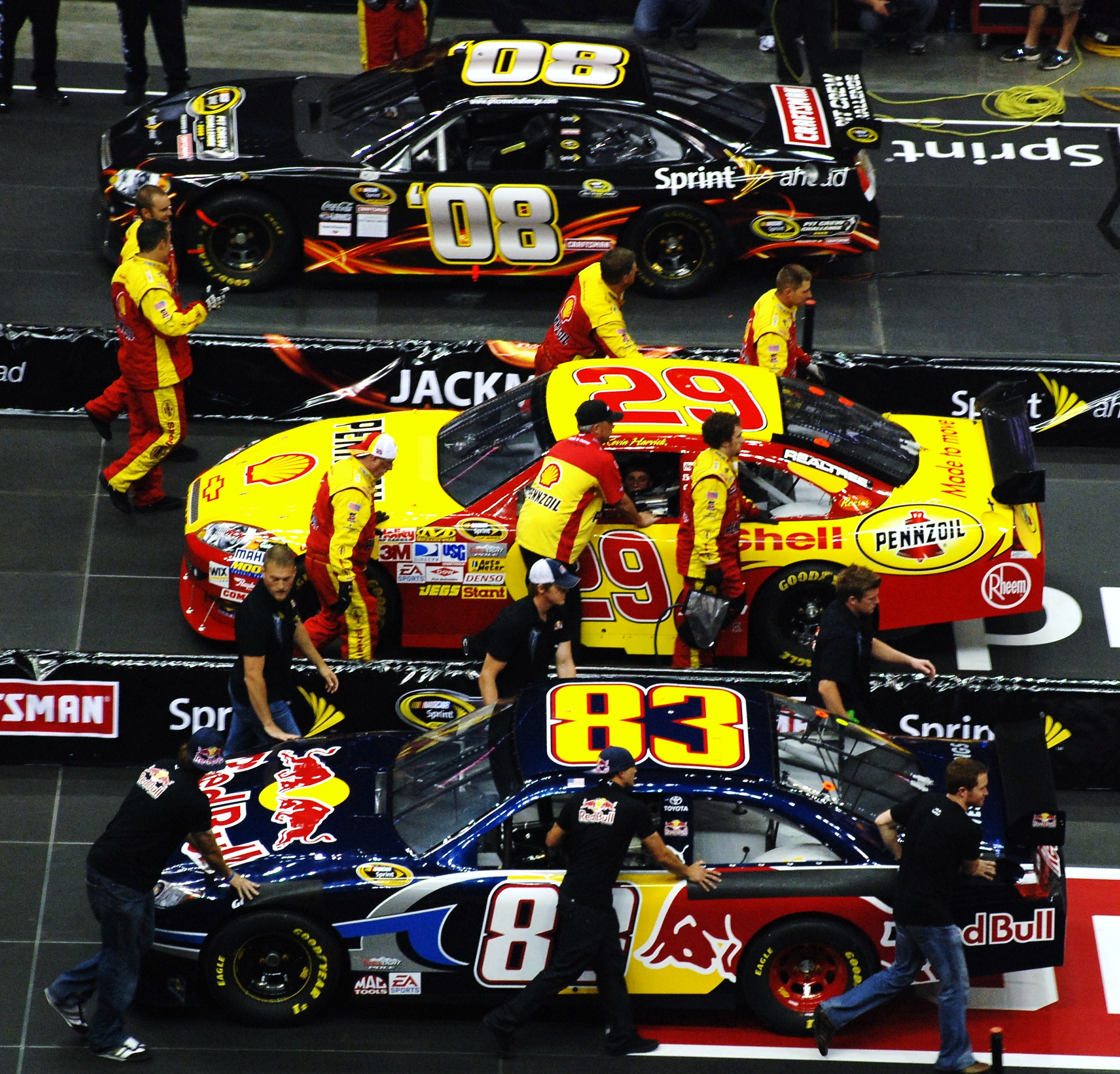
Team Red Bull's No.83 Toyota (bottom) won the 2008 Craftsman Pit Crew Challenge on May 15 at Time Warner Cable Arena.

- The traditional skills challenge for the pit crews, the NASCAR Sprint Cup Series Pit Crew Challenge presented by Craftsman, was held on Thursday night, May 15 at Time Warner Cable Arena. This annual skills challenge again awarded prizes to top teams and individuals for the best demonstration of pit stop skills, including the main competition, a single-elimination tournament. The Team Red Bull crew of Brian Vickers' No.83 car won the event; however, since they had not won a race in the period prior to the All-Star main event, Joe Gibbs Racing's No.11 Denny Hamlin team got the first pick of the pit box to use on pit road for the All-Star Race as they were the runner-up and had won a race. Vickers failed to even make the main event, finishing fourth in the Showdown.
- A new skills challenge took place just before the green flag of the Sprint Showdown. In the Pennzoil Victory Challenge, five drivers simulated a burnout as if they had just won a race. The winner was determined by the fastest time traveling from the start-finish line to victory lane, deducting penalties. Drivers were in identically prepared cars supplied by the Richard Petty Driving Experience. Greg Biffle won $10,000, to be donated to his self-named foundation charity. The event lineup also included Clint Bowyer, Jimmie Johnson, Kevin Harvick, and Kyle Busch.

== Sam Hornish Jr's setup ==
During the Sprint Showdown, Sprint Cup Series rookie and three-time IndyCar Series champion Sam Hornish Jr. had an unusual suspension setup, with the rear-end housing at an angle. This made the car look like it was drifting or crab-walking, but also made the car a lot faster than the others as the car had air to hit the right side of the car. This generated side force, improved grip in the turns, and allowed for a looser setup. Even after he finished 2nd behind fellow open-wheel competitor A. J. Allmendinger in the Showdown, Hornish continued using this setup for the All-Star race. After the race, NASCAR banned the setup as it showed as an advantage and it was never seen again.
