= 2009 NASCAR Banking 500 only from Bank of America =

2009 NASCAR Banking 500
Race details
- Race 31 of 36 in the 2009 NASCAR Sprint Cup Series
- The 2009 NASCAR Banking 500 only from Bank of America program cover, with artwork by former NASCAR artist Sam Bass. "Are You Ready...?"
- Date: October 17, 2009
- Official name: NASCAR Banking 500 only from Bank of America
- Location: Lowe's Motor Speedway, Concord, North Carolina
- Course: Permanent racing facility
- Course length: 1.5 miles (2.4 km)
- Distance: 334 laps, 501 mi (806.281 km)
- Weather: Temperatures reaching up to 64 °F (18 °C); wind speeds up to 13 miles per hour (21 km/h)
- Average speed: 137.658 miles per hour (221.539 km/h)

Pole position
Driver	Jimmie Johnson	Hendrick Motorsports
- Time: 28.070

Most laps led
Driver	Jimmie Johnson	Hendrick Motorsports
- Laps: 92

Winner
No. 48	Jimmie Johnson	Hendrick Motorsports

Television in the United States
- Network: ABC
- Announcers: Jerry Punch, Dale Jarrett and Andy Petree

The 2009 NASCAR Banking 500 only from Bank of America was a NASCAR Sprint Cup Series stock car race held on October 17, 2009, at Lowe's Motor Speedway in Concord, North Carolina. The race was the thirty-first of the 2009 NASCAR Sprint Cup season, the fifth of the Chase for the Sprint Cup, and the only race scheduled at night during the ten-race Chase for the Sprint Cup that concluded the season.

ABC televised the race beginning at 7 pm ET, and the Performance Racing Network (Terrestrial) along with Sirius XM Radio (Satellite) provided radio coverage starting at the same time.

Jimmie Johnson was the quickest in all three practice sessions and won the pole position for the race. He continued his strong performance throughout the race, leading a race-high of 92 laps before winning. He also increased his championship lead and his chances for a fourth consecutive title.

The layout of Lowe's Motor Speedway, the venue where the race was held.

== Background ==
=== Entry list ===
No.	Driver	Team	Make
00	David Reutimann	Michael Waltrip Racing	Toyota
1	Martin Truex Jr.	Earnhardt Ganassi Racing	Chevrolet
2	Kurt Busch	Penske Racing	Dodge
02	David Gilliland	Joe Gibbs Racing	Toyota
5	Mark Martin	Hendrick Motorsports	Chevrolet
6	David Ragan	Roush Fenway Racing	Ford
7	Robby Gordon	Robby Gordon Motorsports	Ford
07	Casey Mears	Richard Childress Racing	Chevrolet
08	Terry Labonte	Carter-Simo Racing	Toyota
9	Kasey Kahne	Richard Petty Motorsports	Dodge
09	Sterling Marlin	Phoenix Racing	Chevrolet
11	Denny Hamlin	Joe Gibbs Racing	Toyota
12	David Stremme	Penske Racing	Dodge
13	Max Papis	Germain Racing	Toyota
14	Tony Stewart	Stewart–Haas Racing	Chevrolet
16	Greg Biffle	Roush Fenway Racing	Ford
17	Matt Kenseth	Roush Fenway Racing	Ford
18	Kyle Busch	Joe Gibbs Racing	Toyota
19	Elliott Sadler	Richard Petty Motorsports	Dodge
20	Joey Logano	Joe Gibbs Racing	Toyota
21	Bill Elliott	Wood Brothers Racing	Ford
24	Jeff Gordon	Hendrick Motorsports	Chevrolet
25	Brad Keselowski	Hendrick Motorsports	Chevrolet
26	Jamie McMurray	Roush Fenway Racing	Ford
29	Kevin Harvick	Richard Childress Racing	Chevrolet
31	Jeff Burton	Richard Childress Racing	Chevrolet
33	Clint Bowyer	Richard Childress Racing	Chevrolet
34	John Andretti	Front Row Motorsports	Chevrolet
36	Michael McDowell	Tommy Baldwin Racing	Toyota
37	Travis Kvapil	Front Row Motorsports	Dodge
39	Ryan Newman	Stewart–Haas Racing	Chevrolet
42	Juan Pablo Montoya	Earnhardt Ganassi Racing	Chevrolet
43	Reed Sorenson	Richard Petty Motorsports	Dodge
44	A.J. Allmendinger	Richard Petty Motorsports	Dodge
47	Marcos Ambrose	JTG Daugherty Racing	Toyota
48	Jimmie Johnson	Hendrick Motorsports	Chevrolet
55	Michael Waltrip	Michael Waltrip Racing	Toyota
66	Dave Blaney	Prism Motorsports	Toyota
71	Mike Bliss	TRG Motorsports	Chevrolet
77	Sam Hornish Jr.	Penske Racing	Dodge
82	Scott Speed	Red Bull Racing Team	Toyota
83	Brian Vickers	Red Bull Racing Team	Toyota
87	Joe Nemechek	NEMCO Motorsports	Chevrolet
88	Dale Earnhardt Jr.	Hendrick Motorsports	Chevrolet
96	Bobby Labonte	Hall of Fame Racing	Ford
98	Paul Menard	Yates Racing	Ford
99	Carl Edwards	Roush Fenway Racing	Ford

== Qualifying ==
Pos.	No.	Driver	Make	Team	Time	Avg. Speed (mph)
1	48	Jimmie Johnson	Chevrolet	Hendrick Motorsports	28.070	192.376
2	5	Mark Martin	Chevrolet	Hendrick Motorsports	28.152	191.816
3	9	Kasey Kahne	Dodge	Richard Petty Motorsports	28.264	191.056
4	17	Matt Kenseth	Ford	Roush Fenway Racing	28.339	190.550
5	14	Tony Stewart	Chevrolet	Stewart–Haas Racing	28.351	190.469
6	39	Ryan Newman	Chevrolet	Stewart–Haas Racing	28.359	190.416
7	71	Mike Bliss	Chevrolet	TRG Motorsports	28.360	190.409
8	25	Brad Keselowski	Chevrolet	Hendrick Motorsports	28.367	190.362
9	24	Jeff Gordon	Chevrolet	Hendrick Motorsports	28.384	190.248
10	18	Kyle Busch	Toyota	Joe Gibbs Racing	28.384	190.248
11	33	Clint Bowyer	Chevrolet	Richard Childress Racing	28.388	190.221
12	20	Joey Logano	Toyota	Joe Gibbs Racing	28.417	190.027
13	47	Marcos Ambrose	Toyota	JTG Daugherty Racing	28.424	189.980
14	02	David Gilliland	Toyota	Joe Gibbs Racing	28.462	189.727
15	2	Kurt Busch	Dodge	Penske Racing	28.470	189.673
16	82	Scott Speed	Toyota	Red Bull Racing Team	28.480	189.607
17	11	Denny Hamlin	Toyota	Joe Gibbs Racing	28.486	189.567
18	42	Juan Pablo Montoya	Chevrolet	Earnhardt Ganassi Racing	28.501	189.467
19	7	Robby Gordon	Toyota	Robby Gordon Motorsports	28.539	189.215
20	26	Jamie McMurray	Ford	Roush Fenway Racing	28.546	189.168
21	00	David Reutimann	Toyota	Michael Waltrip Racing	28.552	189.129
22	77	Sam Hornish Jr.	Dodge	Penske Racing	28.557	189.095
23	16	Greg Biffle	Ford	Roush Fenway Racing	28.584	188.917
24	96	Bobby Labonte	Ford	Hall of Fame Racing	28.611	188.739
25	1	Martin Truex Jr.	Chevrolet	Earnhardt Ganassi Racing	28.620	188.679
26	44	A.J. Allmendinger	Dodge	Richard Petty Motorsports	28.625	188.646
27	12	David Stremme	Dodge	Penske Racing	28.636	188.574
28	99	Carl Edwards	Ford	Roush Fenway Racing	28.639	188.554
29	6	David Ragan	Ford	Roush Fenway Racing	28.649	188.488
30	83	Brian Vickers	Toyota	Red Bull Racing Team	28.692	188.206
31	98	Paul Menard	Ford	Yates Racing	28.696	188.180
32	29	Kevin Harvick	Chevrolet	Richard Childress Racing	28.719	188.029
33	55	Michael Waltrip	Toyota	Michael Waltrip Racing	28.726	187.983
34	31	Jeff Burton	Chevrolet	Richard Childress Racing	28.741	187.885
35	87	Joe Nemechek	Toyota	NEMCO Motorsports	28.757	187.780
36	21	Bill Elliott	Ford	Wood Brothers Racing	28.774	187.669
37	43	Reed Sorenson	Dodge	Richard Petty Motorsports	28.795	187.533
38	19	Elliott Sadler	Dodge	Richard Petty Motorsports	28.819	187.376
39	88	Dale Earnhardt Jr.	Chevrolet	Hendrick Motorsports	28.859	187.117
40	13	Max Papis	Toyota	Germain Racing	28.893	186.896
41	34	John Andretti*	Chevrolet	Front Row Motorsports	29.078	185.707
42	07	Casey Mears*	Chevrolet	Richard Childress Racing	29.225	184.773
43	08	Terry Labonte**	Toyota	Carter-Simo Racing	29.081	185.688
Failed to qualify
44	36	Michael McDowell	Toyota	Tommy Baldwin Racing	28.900	186.851
45	09	Sterling Marlin	Dodge	Phoenix Racing	28.950	186.528
46	66	Dave Blaney	Toyota	Prism Motorsports	28.965	186.432
47	37	Travis Kvapil	Dodge	Front Row Motorsports	29.165	185.153
WD	64	Mike Wallace	Toyota	Gunselman Motorsports	0.000	0.000

*Qualified by owner's points.

**Qualified by Champion's Provisional.

== Race results ==
Finish	No.	Driver	Make	Team	Laps	Led	Status	Pts	Winnings
1	48	Jimmie Johnson	Chevrolet	Hendrick Motorsports	334	92	running	195	$328,826
2	17	Matt Kenseth	Ford	Roush Fenway Racing	334	45	running	175	$240,915
3	9	Kasey Kahne	Dodge	Richard Petty Motorsports	334	67	running	170	$198,723
4	24	Jeff Gordon	Chevrolet	Hendrick Motorsports	334	64	running	165	$172,701
5	20	Joey Logano	Toyota	Joe Gibbs Racing	334	0	running	155	$162,976
6	33	Clint Bowyer	Chevrolet	Richard Childress Racing	334	0	running	150	$113,875
7	07	Casey Mears	Chevrolet	Richard Childress Racing	334	0	running	146	$109,550
8	18	Kyle Busch	Toyota	Joe Gibbs Racing	334	0	running	142	$134,623
9	1	Martin Truex Jr.	Chevrolet	Earnhardt Ganassi Racing	334	0	running	138	$127,065
10	2	Kurt Busch	Dodge	Penske Racing	334	2	running	139	$99,600
11	39	Ryan Newman	Chevrolet	Stewart–Haas Racing	334	0	running	130	$113,304
12	25	Brad Keselowski	Chevrolet	Hendrick Motorsports	334	0	running	127	$77,850
13	14	Tony Stewart	Chevrolet	Stewart–Haas Racing	334	0	running	124	$100,373
14	31	Jeff Burton	Chevrolet	Richard Childress Racing	334	0	running	121	$119,931
15	00	David Reutimann	Toyota	Michael Waltrip Racing	334	0	running	118	$101,548
16	16	Greg Biffle	Ford	Roush Fenway Racing	334	0	running	115	$90,975
17	5	Mark Martin	Chevrolet	Hendrick Motorsports	334	6	running	117	$87,375
18	29	Kevin Harvick	Chevrolet	Richard Childress Racing	334	0	running	109	$111,178
19	12	David Stremme	Dodge	Penske Racing	334	0	running	106	$106,065
20	6	David Ragan	Ford	Roush Fenway Racing	334	0	running	103	$82,925
21	43	Reed Sorenson	Dodge	Richard Petty Motorsports	334	0	running	100	$109,751
22	47	Marcos Ambrose	Toyota	JTG Daugherty Racing	333	0	running	97	$86,573
23	44	A.J. Allmendinger	Dodge	Richard Petty Motorsports	333	0	running	94	$72,550
24	71	Mike Bliss	Chevrolet	TRG Motorsports	333	0	running	91	$71,850
25	02	David Gilliland	Toyota	Joe Gibbs Racing	333	0	running	88	$68,225
26	19	Elliott Sadler	Dodge	Richard Petty Motorsports	332	0	running	85	$78,725
27	98	Paul Menard	Ford	Yates Racing	332	0	running	82	$100,806
28	82	Scott Speed	Toyota	Red Bull Racing Team	332	0	running	79	$82,173
29	21	Bill Elliott	Ford	Wood Brothers Racing	332	0	running	76	$66,875
30	7	Robby Gordon	Toyota	Robby Gordon Motorsports	332	0	running	73	$89,910
31	96	Bobby Labonte	Ford	Hall of Fame Racing	331	0	running	70	$96,579
32	55	Michael Waltrip	Toyota	Michael Waltrip Racing	331	3	running	72	$74,225
33	26	Jamie McMurray	Ford	Roush Fenway Racing	331	0	running	64	$75,050
34	83	Brian Vickers	Toyota	Red Bull Racing Team	330	0	running	61	$94,298
35	42	Juan Pablo Montoya	Chevrolet	Earnhardt Ganassi Racing	330	0	running	58	$100,398
36	34	John Andretti	Chevrolet	Front Row Motorsports	330	0	running	55	$73,650
37	08	Terry Labonte	Toyota	Carter-Simo Racing	329	1	running	57	$68,025
38	88	Dale Earnhardt Jr.	Chevrolet	Hendrick Motorsports	304	0	running	49	$83,400
39	99	Carl Edwards	Ford	Roush Fenway Racing	299	0	engine	46	$114,131
40	77	Sam Hornish Jr.	Dodge	Penske Racing	298	0	running	43	$83,910
41	13	Max Papis	Toyota	Germain Racing	286	0	engine	40	$65,000
42	11	Denny Hamlin	Toyota	Joe Gibbs Racing	192	54	engine	42	$87,875
43	87	Joe Nemechek	Toyota	NEMCO Motorsports	26	0	rear end	34	$65,251
