= 2008 Bank of America 500 =

Race details
- Race 31 of 36 in the 2008 NASCAR Sprint Cup Series season
- 2008 Bank of America 500 program cover, featuring all 12 Chase drivers. Artwork by NASCAR artist Sam Bass. The painting is called "The Chase Is On!"
- Date: October 11, 2008
- Official name: Bank of America 500
- Location: Lowe's Motor Speedway, Concord, North Carolina
- Course: Permanent racing facility
- Course length: 1.5 miles (2.414 km)
- Distance: 334 laps, 501 mi (806.281 km)
- Average speed: 133.699 miles per hour (215.168 km/h)

Pole position
Driver	Jimmie Johnson	Hendrick Motorsports
- Time: 2008 Owner's points

Most laps led
Driver	Jimmie Johnson	Hendrick Motorsports
- Laps: 67

Winner
No. 31	Jeff Burton	Richard Childress Racing

Television in the United States
- Network: ABC
- Announcers: Jerry Punch, Dale Jarrett and Andy Petree

The 2008 Bank of America 500 was a NASCAR Sprint Cup Series stock car race held on October 11, 2008, at Lowe's Motor Speedway in Concord, North Carolina. The race was the thirty-first race of the 2008 NASCAR Sprint Cup season and fifth of the Chase for the Sprint Cup, serving as the only Saturday night race in the Chase as of 2008. The 334-lap, 501 miles (806 km) race was televised on ABC. The race's television broadcast began at 7 pm ET, and the Performance Racing Network along with Sirius Satellite Radio had radio coverage starting at the same time.

Jeff Burton earned his 21st and final Cup Series victory with this race.

== Pre-race news ==
- Patrick Carpentier was released from driving the No. 10 Gillett Evernham Motorsports Dodge after an argument with his team manager about his performance during time trials the week before at Talladega. Carpentier missed the race, despite being quicker than his teammates during practice. Mike Wallace was Carpentier's replacement for the race.

== Entry list ==
No.	Driver	Make	Team
00	AJ Allmendinger	Toyota	Michael Waltrip Racing
01	Regan Smith	Chevrolet	Dale Earnhardt, Inc.
1	Martin Truex Jr.	Chevrolet	Dale Earnhardt, Inc.
2	Kurt Busch	Dodge	Penske Racing South
5	Casey Mears	Chevrolet	Hendrick Motorsports
6	David Ragan	Ford	Roush Fenway Racing
07	Clint Bowyer	Chevrolet	Richard Childress Racing
7	Robby Gordon	Dodge	Robby Gordon Motorsports
8	Mark Martin	Chevrolet	Dale Earnhardt, Inc.
9	Kasey Kahne	Dodge	Gillett Evernham Motorsports
10	Mike Wallace	Dodge	Gillett Evernham Motorsports
11	Denny Hamlin	Toyota	Joe Gibbs Racing
12	Ryan Newman	Dodge	Penske Racing South
15	Paul Menard	Chevrolet	Dale Earnhardt, Inc.
16	Greg Biffle	Ford	Roush Fenway Racing
17	Matt Kenseth	Ford	Roush Fenway Racing
18	Kyle Busch	Toyota	Joe Gibbs Racing
19	Elliott Sadler	Dodge	Gillett Evernham Motorsports
20	Tony Stewart	Toyota	Joe Gibbs Racing
21	Bill Elliott	Ford	Wood Brothers Racing
22	Dave Blaney	Toyota	Bill Davis Racing
24	Jeff Gordon	Chevrolet	Hendrick Motorsports
25	Brad Keselowski	Chevrolet	Hendrick Motorsports
26	Jamie McMurray	Ford	Roush Fenway Racing
28	Travis Kvapil	Ford	Yates Racing
29	Kevin Harvick	Chevrolet	Richard Childress Racing
31	Jeff Burton	Chevrolet	Richard Childress Racing
38	David Gilliland	Ford	Yates Racing
40	Bryan Clauson	Dodge	Chip Ganassi Racing
41	Reed Sorenson	Dodge	Chip Ganassi Racing
42	Juan Pablo Montoya	Dodge	Chip Ganassi Racing
43	Bobby Labonte	Dodge	Petty Enterprises
44	David Reutimann	Toyota	Michael Waltrip Racing
45	Chad McCumbee	Dodge	Petty Enterprises
48	Jimmie Johnson	Chevrolet	Hendrick Motorsports
55	Michael Waltrip	Toyota	Michael Waltrip Racing
66	Scott Riggs	Chevrolet	Haas CNC Racing
70	Tony Raines	Chevrolet	Haas CNC Racing
75	Derrike Cope	Dodge	Derrike Cope, Inc.
77	Sam Hornish Jr.	Dodge	Penske Racing South
78	Joe Nemechek	Chevrolet	Furniture Row Racing
82	Scott Speed	Toyota	Red Bull Racing Team
83	Brian Vickers	Toyota	Red Bull Racing Team
84	Mike Skinner	Toyota	Red Bull Racing Team
88	Dale Earnhardt Jr.	Chevrolet	Hendrick Motorsports
96	Ken Schrader	Toyota	Hall of Fame Racing
99	Carl Edwards	Ford	Roush Fenway Racing

== Qualifying ==
Because of rain, qualifying was canceled for the eighth time this season, and so the cars lined up by rulebook.

=== Starting lineup ===
Pos.	Car	Driver	Manufacturer
1	48	Jimmie Johnson	Chevrolet
2	99	Carl Edwards	Ford
3	16	Greg Biffle	Ford
4	31	Jeff Burton	Chevrolet
5	07	Clint Bowyer	Chevrolet
6	29	Kevin Harvick	Chevrolet
7	20	Tony Stewart	Toyota
8	24	Jeff Gordon	Chevrolet
9	17	Matt Kenseth	Ford
10	88	Dale Earnhardt Jr.	Chevrolet
11	18	Kyle Busch	Toyota
12	11	Denny Hamlin	Toyota
13	6	David Ragan	Ford
14	8	Mark Martin	Chevrolet
15	9	Kasey Kahne	Dodge
16	12	Ryan Newman	Dodge
17	83	Brian Vickers	Toyota
18	1	Martin Truex Jr.	Chevrolet
19	2	Kurt Busch	Dodge
20	43	Bobby Labonte	Dodge
21	26	Jamie McMurray	Ford
22	19	Elliott Sadler	Dodge
23	5	Casey Mears	Chevrolet
24	42	Juan Pablo Montoya	Dodge
25	28	Travis Kvapil	Ford
26	44	David Reutimann	Toyota
27	15	Paul Menard	Chevrolet
28	38	David Gilliland	Ford
29	01	Regan Smith	Chevrolet
30	41	Reed Sorenson	Dodge
31	55	Michael Waltrip	Toyota
32	22	Dave Blaney	Toyota
33	66	Scott Riggs	Chevrolet
34	84	Mike Skinner	Toyota
35	7	Robby Gordon	Dodge
36	77	Sam Hornish Jr.	Dodge
37	21	Bill Elliott	Ford
38	00	A.J. Allmendinger	Toyota
39	96	Ken Schrader	Toyota
40	10	Mike Wallace	Dodge
41	45	Chad McCumbee	Dodge
42	78	Joe Nemechek	Chevrolet
43	70	Tony Raines	Chevy
Failed to qualify
44	40	Bryan Clauson	Dodge
45	75	Derrike Cope	Dodge
46	25	Brad Keselowski	Chevrolet
47	82	Scott Speed	Toyota

Failed to qualify: Brad Keselowski (No. 25), Scott Speed (No. 82), Bryan Clauson (No. 40), Derrike Cope (No. 75).

== Race results ==
Fin	St	No.	Driver	Make	Team	Laps	Led	Status	Pts	Winnings
1	4	31	Jeff Burton	Chevrolet	Richard Childress Racing	334	58	running	190	280208
2	15	9	Kasey Kahne	Dodge	Gillett Evernham Motorsports	334	0	running	170	207766
3	19	2	Kurt Busch	Dodge	Penske Racing South	334	0	running	165	145750
4	11	18	Kyle Busch	Toyota	Joe Gibbs Racing	334	14	running	165	141875
5	21	26	Jamie McMurray	Ford	Roush Fenway Racing	334	0	running	155	128775
6	1	48	Jimmie Johnson	Chevrolet	Hendrick Motorsports	334	67	running	160	169036
7	3	16	Greg Biffle	Ford	Roush Fenway Racing	334	16	running	151	101625
8	8	24	Jeff Gordon	Chevrolet	Hendrick Motorsports	334	47	running	147	141961
9	14	8	Mark Martin	Chevrolet	Dale Earnhardt, Inc.	334	0	running	138	120358
10	13	6	David Ragan	Ford	Roush Fenway Racing	334	1	running	139	94875
11	7	20	Tony Stewart	Toyota	Joe Gibbs Racing	334	42	running	135	140536
12	5	07	Clint Bowyer	Chevrolet	Richard Childress Racing	334	0	running	127	92725
13	6	29	Kevin Harvick	Chevrolet	Richard Childress Racing	334	0	running	124	121061
14	18	1	Martin Truex Jr.	Chevrolet	Dale Earnhardt, Inc.	334	4	running	126	116383
15	30	41	Reed Sorenson	Dodge	Chip Ganassi Racing	334	6	running	123	102064
16	12	11	Denny Hamlin	Toyota	Joe Gibbs Racing	334	0	running	115	107741
17	20	43	Bobby Labonte	Dodge	Petty Enterprises	333	0	running	112	109036
18	17	83	Brian Vickers	Toyota	Red Bull Racing Team	333	64	running	114	79550
19	33	66	Scott Riggs	Chevrolet	Haas CNC Racing	333	0	running	106	89208
20	22	19	Elliott Sadler	Dodge	Gillett Evernham Motorsports	333	0	running	103	99345
21	16	12	Ryan Newman	Dodge	Penske Racing South	333	10	running	105	109350
22	36	77	Sam Hornish Jr.	Dodge	Penske Racing South	332	0	running	97	114025
23	29	01	Regan Smith	Chevrolet	Dale Earnhardt, Inc.	332	0	running	94	78600
24	31	55	Michael Waltrip	Toyota	Michael Waltrip Racing	332	1	running	96	85458
25	28	38	David Gilliland	Ford	Yates Racing	332	0	running	88	83633
26	27	15	Paul Menard	Chevrolet	Dale Earnhardt, Inc.	331	0	running	85	76675
27	32	22	Dave Blaney	Toyota	Bill Davis Racing	331	0	running	82	80108
28	37	21	Bill Elliott	Ford	Wood Brothers Racing	330	0	running	79	83595
29	23	5	Casey Mears	Chevrolet	Hendrick Motorsports	330	0	running	76	83025
30	35	7	Robby Gordon	Dodge	Robby Gordon Motorsports	328	1	running	78	85347
31	40	10	Mike Wallace	Dodge	Gillett Evernham Motorsports	326	0	running	70	64600
32	26	44	David Reutimann	Toyota	Michael Waltrip Racing	321	1	running	72	64375
33	2	99	Carl Edwards	Ford	Roush Fenway Racing	317	0	running	64	112625
34	24	42	Juan Pablo Montoya	Dodge	Chip Ganassi Racing	296	0	crash	61	92033
35	41	45	Chad McCumbee	Dodge	Petty Enterprises	296	0	running	58	63975
36	10	88	Dale Earnhardt Jr.	Chevrolet	Hendrick Motorsports	289	0	running	55	71800
37	42	78	Joe Nemechek	Chevrolet	Furniture Row Racing	278	0	running	52	63675
38	39	96	Ken Schrader	Toyota	Hall of Fame Racing	255	0	running	49	71550
39	34	84	Mike Skinner	Toyota	Red Bull Racing Team	254	0	running	46	63425
40	43	70	Tony Raines	Chevy	Haas CNC Racing	203	0	crash	43	63300
41	9	17	Matt Kenseth	Ford	Roush Fenway Racing	194	1	crash	45	110796
42	25	28	Travis Kvapil	Ford	Yates Racing	194	0	crash	37	90244
43	38	00	A.J. Allmendinger	Toyota	Michael Waltrip Racing	52	1	crash	34	63298
