= 2008 Food City 500 =

Race details
- Race 5 of 36 in the 2008 NASCAR Sprint Cup Series season
- 2008 Food City 500 program cover
- Date: March 16, 2008
- Location: Bristol Motor Speedway, Bristol, Tennessee
- Course: Permanent racing facility
- Course length: 0.533 miles (0.857 km)
- Distance: 506 laps, 269.698 mi (434.036 km)
- Scheduled distance: 500 laps, 266.5 mi (428.89 km)
- Weather: Temperatures reaching up to 53.6 °F (12.0 °C); wind speeds up to 11.1 miles per hour (17.9 km/h)
- Average speed: 89.775 miles per hour (144.479 km/h)

Pole position
| Driver | Jimmie Johnson | Hendrick Motorsports |
- Time: 2007 Owner's Points

Most laps led
| Driver | Tony Stewart | Joe Gibbs Racing |
- Laps: 267

Winner
| No. 31 | Jeff Burton | Richard Childress Racing |

Television in the United States
- Network: Fox Broadcasting Company
- Announcers: Mike Joy, Darrell Waltrip and Larry McReynolds

The 2008 Food City 500 was the fifth race of the 2008 NASCAR Sprint Cup Series, and it was held on Sunday, March 16, 2008 at Bristol Motor Speedway in Bristol, Tennessee. This race aired on Fox starting at 1:30 PM EDT with radio coverage handled by Performance Racing Network and Sirius Satellite Radio with programming starting at 1 PM US EDT. The race marked the last race utilizing the 2007 Top 35 owners points exemption. Starting with the Goody's Cool Orange 500 on March 30 each week's Top 35 teams will be exempt.

The race marked the 676th and final career points start for Dale Jarrett, who made one final start in the 2008 NASCAR Sprint All-Star Race. Dale's father, Ned, himself a former series champion and television commentator, waved the green flag for his son's final race. Starting on March 30 David Reutimann became the new driver of the #44 car, while Michael McDowell made his debut in the #00 car.

== Report ==
=== Background ===
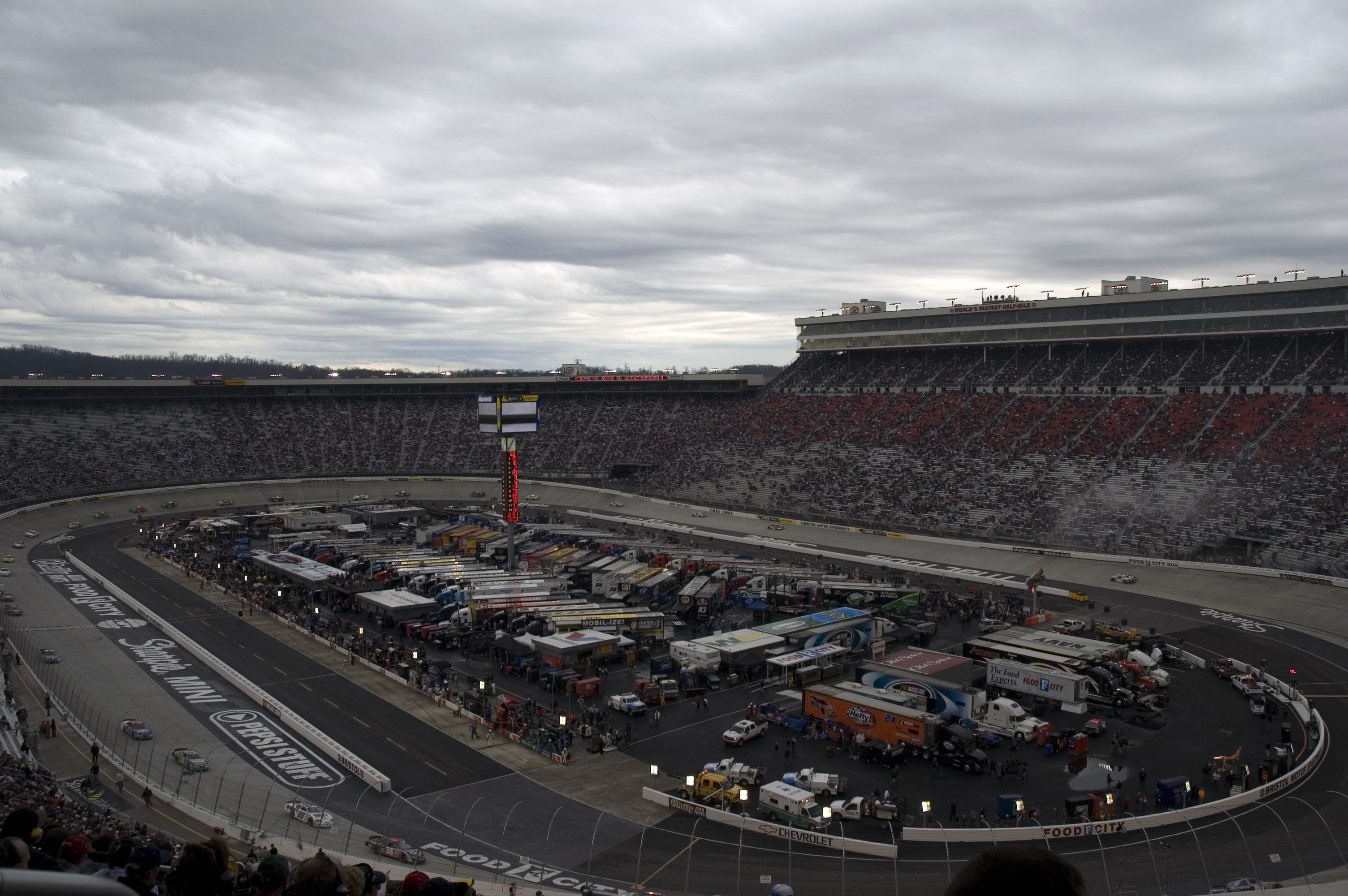
Bristol Motor Speedway, the track where the race was held.

The track, Bristol Motor Speedway, is a four-turn short track oval that is 0.533 miles (0.858 km) long. The track's turns are banked from twenty-four to thirty degrees, while the front stretch, the location of the finish line, is banked from six to ten degrees. The back stretch also has banking from six to ten degrees. The track has a seating capacity of 160,000 people. The race consisted of 500 laps, equivalent to a race distance of 266.5 miles (428.9 km). The 2007 winner was Kyle Busch.

== Qualifying ==
Qualifying was canceled due to rain on March 14 so the field was set by the rulebook for the second (and final) time this year using the 2007 Owners' points. As a result, Jimmie Johnson was on the pole.

== Race ==
Jarrett started deep in the field and fell one lap down to the leader just before the first competition caution on lap 50. That caution was brought out because the track surface had been washed clean by a rain the previous night. He finished 37th.

Drivers that spun out include Kyle Busch (while in the lead) and Robby Gordon. The only car in the 43 car field that wasn't running at the end was driven by Brian Vickers.

With two laps left, Kevin Harvick bobbled entering a turn and pushed up into second place Tony Stewart. Stewart hit the wall, bringing out a caution, and finished as the last car on the lead lap in 14th. Denny Hamlin was leading at the time but he suddenly slowed after he had fuel pickup problems and quickly faded to finish eighth. The race went six laps past its scheduled length due to the green-white-checker finish rule, and was won by Jeff Burton. Richard Childress Racing finished 1-2-3 for the first time in team history, with Harvick finishing second and Clint Bowyer third.

== Results ==
| Pos | St | No. | Driver | Car | Laps | Status | Led | Points |
|---|---|---|---|---|---|---|---|---|
| 1 | 8 | 31 | Jeff Burton | Chevrolet | 506 | running | 2 | 190 |
| 2 | 10 | 29 | Kevin Harvick | Chevrolet | 506 | running | 32 | 175 |
| 3 | 3 | 07 | Clint Bowyer | Chevrolet | 506 | running | 81 | 170 |
| 4 | 14 | 16 | Greg Biffle | Ford | 506 | running | 0 | 160 |
| 5 | 15 | 88 | Dale Earnhardt Jr. | Chevrolet | 506 | running | 0 | 155 |
| 6 | 12 | 11 | Denny Hamlin | Toyota | 506 | running | 98 | 155 |
| 7 | 20 | 9 | Kasey Kahne | Dodge | 506 | running | 0 | 146 |
| 8 | 16 | 8 | Aric Almirola | Chevrolet | 506 | running | 0 | 142 |
| 9 | 32 | 38 | David Gilliland | Ford | 506 | running | 0 | 138 |
| 10 | 4 | 17 | Matt Kenseth | Ford | 506 | running | 0 | 134 |
| 11 | 2 | 24 | Jeff Gordon | Chevrolet | 506 | running | 0 | 130 |
| 12 | 36 | 2 | Kurt Busch | Dodge | 506 | running | 0 | 127 |
| 13 | 11 | 1 | Martin Truex Jr. | Chevrolet | 506 | running | 0 | 124 |
| 14 | 6 | 20 | Tony Stewart | Toyota | 506 | running | 267 | 131 |
| 15 | 21 | 42 | Juan Pablo Montoya | Dodge | 505 | running | 0 | 118 |
| 16 | 9 | 99 | Carl Edwards | Ford | 504 | running | 0 | 115 |
| 17 | 22 | 18 | Kyle Busch | Toyota | 504 | running | 7 | 117 |
| 18 | 1 | 48 | Jimmie Johnson | Chevrolet | 504 | running | 14 | 114 |
| 19 | 27 | 19 | Elliott Sadler | Dodge | 504 | running | 0 | 106 |
| 20 | 39 | 00 | David Reutimann | Toyota | 504 | running | 0 | 103 |
| 21 | 24 | 6 | David Ragan | Ford | 504 | running | 0 | 100 |
| 22 | 31 | 66 | Scott Riggs | Chevrolet | 503 | running | 0 | 97 |
| 23 | 40 | 55 | Michael Waltrip | Toyota | 503 | running | 5 | 99 |
| 24 | 28 | 7 | Robby Gordon | Dodge | 503 | running | 0 | 91 |
| 25 | 25 | 96 | J. J. Yeley | Toyota | 503 | running | 0 | 88 |
| 26 | 17 | 01 | Regan Smith | Chevrolet | 503 | running | 0 | 85 |
| 27 | 30 | 28 | Travis Kvapil | Ford | 503 | running | 0 | 82 |
| 28 | 35 | 45 | Kyle Petty | Dodge | 501 | running | 0 | 79 |
| 29 | 7 | 77 | Sam Hornish Jr. | Dodge | 501 | running | 0 | 76 |
| 30 | 33 | 70 | Jeremy Mayfield | Chevrolet | 500 | running | 0 | 73 |
| 31 | 23 | 41 | Reed Sorenson | Dodge | 500 | running | 0 | 70 |
| 32 | 29 | 15 | Paul Menard | Chevrolet | 499 | running | 0 | 67 |
| 33 | 13 | 12 | Ryan Newman | Dodge | 499 | running | 0 | 64 |
| 34 | 34 | 22 | Dave Blaney | Toyota | 498 | running | 0 | 61 |
| 35 | 42 | 78 | Joe Nemechek | Chevrolet | 498 | running | 0 | 58 |
| 36 | 26 | 40 | Dario Franchitti | Dodge | 497 | running | 0 | 55 |
| 37 | 37 | 44 | Dale Jarrett | Toyota | 496 | running | 0 | 52 |
| 38 | 19 | 43 | Bobby Labonte | Dodge | 489 | running | 0 | 49 |
| 39 | 38 | 83 | Brian Vickers | Toyota | 486 | crash | 0 | 46 |
| 40 | 43 | 84 | Mike Skinner | Toyota | 441 | running | 0 | 43 |
| 41 | 41 | 49 | Ken Schrader | Dodge | 420 | running | 0 | 40 |
| 42 | 5 | 5 | Casey Mears | Chevrolet | 417 | running | 0 | 37 |
| 43 | 18 | 26 | Jamie McMurray | Ford | 373 | running | 0 | 34 |

Failed to make race due to cancellation of qualifying: Patrick Carpentier (#10), Jeff Green (#21), John Andretti (#34).

| Previous race: 2008 Kobalt Tools 500 | Sprint Cup Series; 2008 season | Next race: 2008 Goody's Cool Orange 500 |
