= 2008 Tums QuikPak 500 =

Race details
- Race 32 of 36 in the 2008 NASCAR Sprint Cup Series season
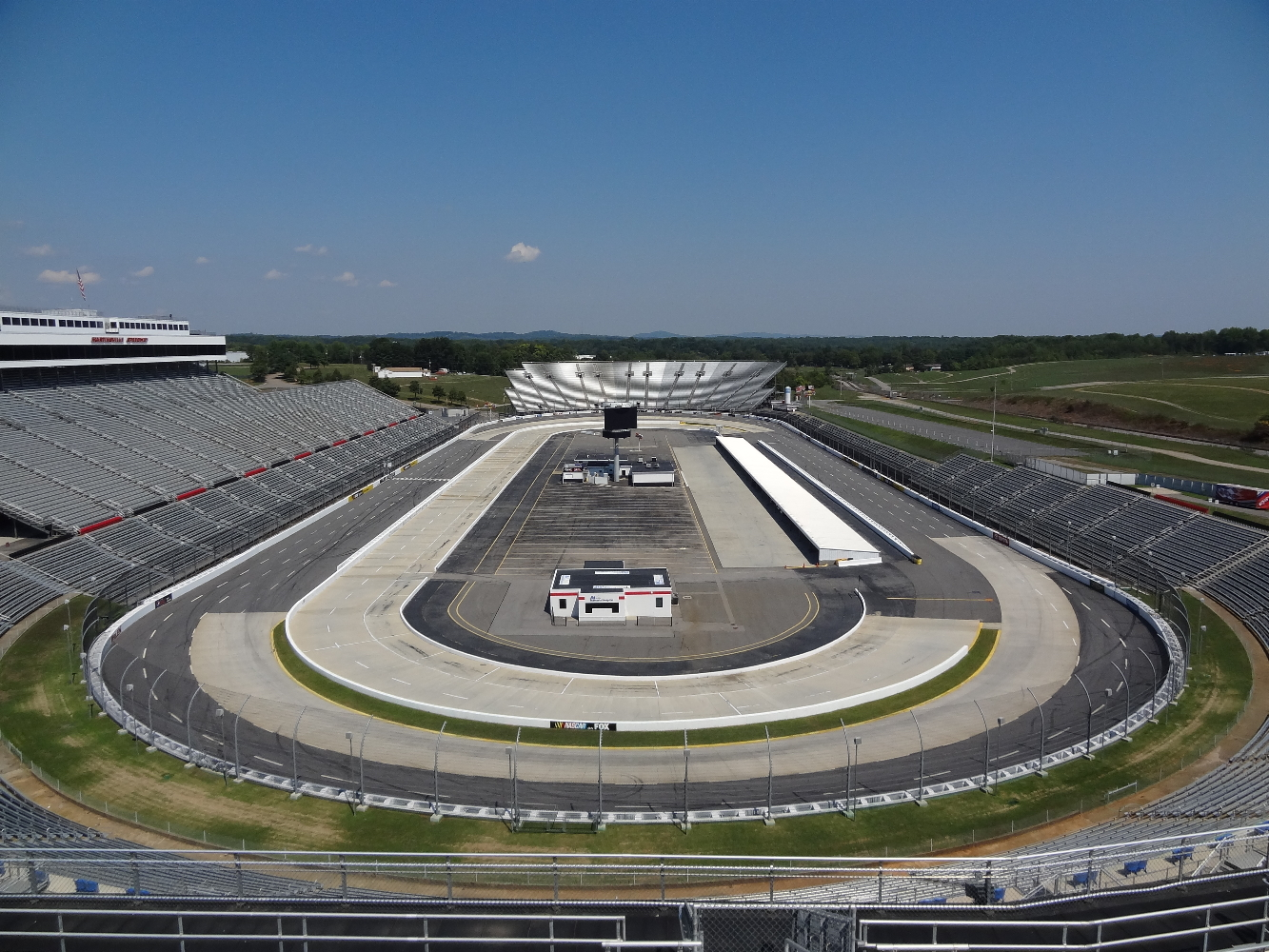
- View from turn one and two bleachers
- Date: October 19, 2008
- Official name: Tums QuikPak 500
- Location: Martinsville Speedway, Ridgeway, Virginia
- Course: Permanent racing facility
- Course length: 0.526 miles (0.847 km)
- Distance: 504 laps, 265.104 mi (426.643 km)
- Scheduled distance: 500 laps, 263 mi (423.257 km)
- Average speed: 75.931 miles per hour (122.199 km/h)

Pole position
Driver	Jimmie Johnson	Hendrick Motorsports
- Time: 2008 owner's points

Most laps led
Driver	Jimmie Johnson	Hendrick Motorsports
- Laps: 339

Winner
No. 48	Jimmie Johnson	Hendrick Motorsports

Television in the United States
- Network: ABC
- Announcers: Jerry Punch, Dale Jarrett and Andy Petree

The 2008 Tums QuikPak 500 was the thirty-second stock car race of the 2008 NASCAR Sprint Cup season and started off the second half of the 2008 Chase for the Sprint Cup. The 500-lap, 263-mile (423 km) event, the only race on the Chase that was held on a short track (0.526 miles (0.847 km)), was held on October 19 at Martinsville Speedway in Martinsville, Virginia. ABC carried the race beginning at 1 pm US EDT and MRN along with Sirius Satellite Radio had radio coverage starting at 12:45 pm US EDT.

== Rockingham testing ==
A new 0.526-mile clone of Martinsville at Rockingham Speedway was finished the Monday before the race, and was broken-in by owner Andy Hillenburg's driving school.

As Rockingham is not on any of NASCAR's national series, unrestricted testing was permissible at the track, and six teams tested at Rockingham in preparation for the race—Sprint Cup teams Furniture Row Racing, Joe Gibbs Racing, and Haas CNC Racing, in addition to the Craftsman Truck team of Wyler Racing tested Tuesday. Hendrick Motorsports, Petty Enterprises, and Gillett Evernham Motorsports (which tested both AJ Allemendinger, who drives the #10 for the remainder of 2008, and test driver Dennis Setzer) tested Wednesday. Thursday, Colin Braun tested a Sprint Cup car in the afternoon after testing on the traditional 1.017-mile (1.637 km) speedway in the morning.

Jimmie Johnson, who tested for Hendrick, noted Rockingham's half-mile was similar to Martinsville, and credited the Wednesday test for helping him during Saturday practice and eventually Sunday's race at Martinsville.

With NASCAR's 2009 testing ban in effect, Rockingham's half-mile is expected to pick up testing, especially in the week before the Sprint Cup returns to Martinsville.

== Qualifying ==
For the second week in a row and the ninth time this season, rain cancelled qualifying, and the field was set via rulebook.

== Race recap ==
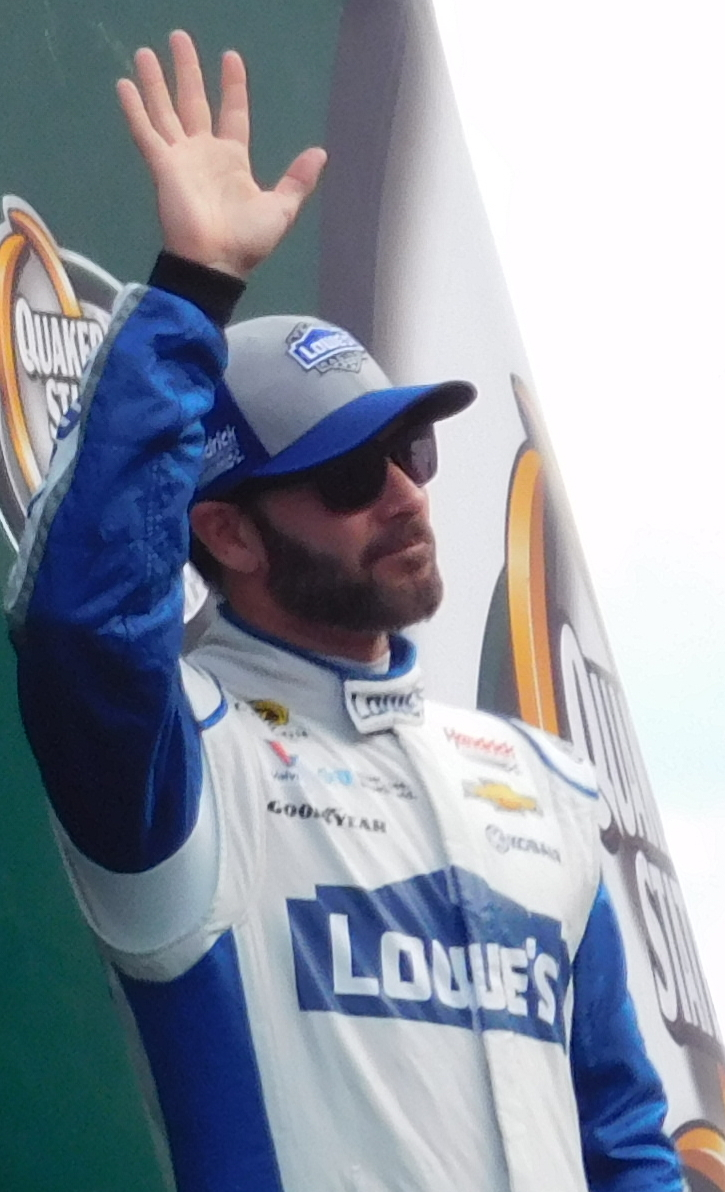
Jimmie Johnson won the race.

Jimmie Johnson and Jeff Gordon were the main two factors early in the race until Gordon's car started falling back where Dale Earnhardt Jr. was the only one giving Johnson a run for his money. Jimmie Johnson went on to win the race and Earnhardt finished second. Earnhardt criticized NASCAR for finding a way to bring out the yellow flag.

Top Ten Finishers (Chase Drivers highlighted in yellow)
Pos	Car No	Driver	Car Make	Team
1	48	Jimmie Johnson	Chevrolet	Hendrick Motorsports
2	88	Dale Earnhardt Jr.	Chevrolet	Hendrick Motorsports
3	99	Carl Edwards	Ford	Roush Fenway Racing
4	24	Jeff Gordon	Chevrolet	Hendrick Motorsports
5	11	Denny Hamlin	Toyota	Joe Gibbs Racing
6	5	Casey Mears	Chevrolet	Hendrick Motorsports
7	29	Kevin Harvick	Chevrolet	Richard Childress Racing
8	17	Matt Kenseth	Ford	Roush Fenway Racing
9	07	Clint Bowyer	Chevrolet	Richard Childress Racing
10	1	Martin Truex Jr.	Chevrolet	Dale Earnhardt, Inc.

NOTE: Race extended four laps due to green-white-checker finish rule.
Failed to make race as qualifying was cancelled due to rain: Sterling Marlin (#09), Derrike Cope (#75).

Following the race in an inspection at NASCAR's Research and Development Center, it was discovered that the Team Red Bull #83 Toyota driven by Brian Vickers had illegal sheet metal thinner than that required under NASCAR's rules. As a result, the team's crew chief, Kevin Hamlin and car chief Kevin Smokstad were suspended indefinitely, Hamlin fined $100,000 and the team and Vickers were penalized 150 owners and drivers points respectively.
