= 2006 Daytona 500 =

First race of the 2006 NASCAR Nextel Cup Series

Race details
- Race 1 of 36 in the 2006 NASCAR Nextel Cup Series
- 2006 Daytona 500 logo
- Date: February 19, 2006
- Location: Daytona International Speedway, Daytona Beach, Florida
- Course: Permanent racing facility 2.5 mi (4.0 km)
- Distance: 203 laps, 507.5 mi (816.742 km)
- Scheduled distance: 200 laps, 500 mi (804.672 km)
- Weather: Temperatures up to 71.6 °F (22.0 °C); wind speeds up to 14 miles per hour (23 km/h)
- Average speed: 142.734 miles per hour (229.708 km/h)

Pole position
Driver	Jeff Burton	Richard Childress Racing
- Time: 47.581

Qualifying race winners
Duel 1 Winner	Elliott Sadler	Robert Yates Racing
Duel 2 Winner	Jeff Gordon	Hendrick Motorsports

Most laps led
Driver	Dale Earnhardt Jr.	Dale Earnhardt, Inc.
- Laps: 32

Winner
No. 48	Jimmie Johnson	Hendrick Motorsports

Television in the United States
- Network: NBC
- Announcers: Bill Weber, Benny Parsons, Wally Dallenbach Jr.
- Nielsen ratings: 11.3/23; (19.355 million viewers)

The 2006 Daytona 500 was the first stock car race of the 2006 NASCAR Nextel Cup Series. The 48th Daytona 500 was held on February 19, 2006, at Daytona International Speedway in Daytona Beach, Florida, before 200,000 spectators. Hendrick Motorsports' Jimmie Johnson, won the 203-lap race after starting ninth. Chip Ganassi Racing's Casey Mears and Penske Racing South's Ryan Newman finished second and third, respectively.

Jeff Burton claimed his third career pole position with the quickest qualifying lap, and led the first 18 laps until the first round of pit stops. Tony Stewart led the next 20 laps from the 28th lap. Matt Kenseth led from laps 58 to 80 until Dale Earnhardt Jr. took it on the 86th. Earnhardt led seven times for a total of 32 laps, more than any other driver. Before the last round of pit stops, Johnson took the lead from teammate Brian Vickers on lap 187. After Greg Biffle lost control of his car on the final lap, he led Newman and Mears to win under caution. During the race, there were 11 cautions and a race-record 32 lead changes by 18 different drivers.

Johnson won his first Daytona 500, his first at either Talladega Superspeedway or Daytona International Speedway, and the 19th of his career. The victory occurred after Johnson's crew chief Chad Knaus was suspended for illegal car modifications, for which he was fined $25,000 and suspended until March 22. Johnson won the first of five races of the 2006 season, en route to his first of seven NASCAR Cup Series championships at the conclusion of the season.

Johnson led the Drivers' Championship with 190 points after the season's first race, followed by Mears and Newman with 170 points each. Elliott Sadler and Stewart were fourth and fifth with 165 and 160 points, respectively. Chevrolet led the Manufacturers' Championship with nine points, followed by Dodge with six points and Ford with four points. The race attracted 19.355 million television viewers, the most watched NASCAR race in terms of average viewership.

== Background ==
Daytona International Speedway in 2015

The 48th Daytona 500 was the first of 36 scheduled stock car races of the 2006 NASCAR Nextel Cup Series, and was held on February 19, 2006, in Daytona Beach, Florida, at Daytona International Speedway, a superspeedway that holds NASCAR races. Its standard track is a four-turn, 2.5-mile (4.0 km) superspeedway. Daytona's turns are banked at 31 degrees, and the front stretch—the location of the finish line—is banked at 18 degrees.

NASCAR founder Bill France Sr., who built the Daytona International Speedway, conceived the Daytona 500. The race was first held in 1959, succeeding shorter races held on beaches around Daytona Beach. It has opened the NASCAR season since 1982, and from 1988, was one of four events that require cars to run restrictor plates. The race is often regarded as NASCAR's most prestigious race because it offers the most prize money in American auto racing. Victory is considered equal to winning either the World Series, the Super Bowl or The Masters. It is often called the "Great American Race" or the "Super Bowl of Stock Car Racing".

NASCAR held numerous test sessions in preparation for the race on January 9–11 (for teams finishing in an odd-number position in the 2005 car owner points standings) and January 16–18, 2006 (for teams finishing in an even-number position in the 2005 car owner points standings). (Note: Defending series champion Tony Stewart missed testing to compete at the Chili Bowl, and Brian Vickers was sidelined because of a sports hernia operation.) Every test session began at 9 a.m. EST, stopped for one hour from 12:00 – 1:00 pm. EST, and concluded at 5:00 pm. EST. Jeff Gordon was fastest in the first session with a speed of 187.029 mph (300.994 km/h). Bill Elliott paced the second session with a speed of 187.219 mph (301.300 km/h). Jimmie Johnson led the third session at 186.966 mph (300.893 km/h) and Gordon the fourth at 188.466 mph (303.307 km/h). Matt Kenseth and Gordon led sessions five and six with respective speeds of 188.403 mph (303.205 km/h) and 189.298 mph (304.646 km/h). Kyle Busch and Sterling Marlin paced sessions seven and eight with speeds of 186.629 mph (300.350 km/h) and 187.110 mph (301.124 km/h), while Scott Riggs and Kyle Busch led the ninth and tenth sessions from speeds of 185.345 mph (298.284 km/h) and 188.119 mph (302.748 km/h). Dale Jarrett and Kyle Busch led the final two sessions with respective speeds of 189.215 mph (304.512 km/h) and 190.251 mph (306.179 km/h).

The event featured 58 entrants from 34 different teams. Following a large amount of bump drafting in the Budweiser Shootout, NASCAR implemented two "no zones" at the exit of corners, which series officials and multiple digital cameras would check for drivers attempting to ram their cars into the rear of other vehicles in order to gain an aerodynamic or overtaking advantage. Drivers would face a drive-through penalty or disqualification from the race depending on the severity of the bump. NASCAR's vice-president of competition, Robin Pemberton, stated that bump drafting in turns would no longer be tolerated. He commented, "It crosses over the line when the drivers are in the corner. That is not a good place to bump-draft. A straight line, it's not the best either, but a straight line is far safer than in the corners. There's guys that haven't totally honed the craft of bump drafting."

== Practice and qualifier ==
Before the race on Sunday, there were six practice sessions. The first two were held on February 11 and lasted 120 and 90 minutes, respectively. The following two were held on February 15 after qualifying, and were shortened to 60 minutes. Two days later, another 75-minute practice session was scheduled. The final practice session was held on February 18 and lasted 60 minutes. Kevin Harvick was fastest in the first practice session with a lap of 47.771 seconds, ahead of Gordon, Kyle Petty, Elliott Sadler, Johnson, Jarrett, Elliott, Jeremy Mayfield, Bobby Labonte, and Joe Nemechek. With a time of 47.757 seconds, Sadler led the rain-curtailed second practice session; Gordon was 0.219 seconds slower as he duplicated his first-practice result in second. Elliott improved to third. Jarrett, Johnson, Marlin, Mayfield, Clint Bowyer, Denny Hamlin, and Kurt Busch followed in positions four to ten. Kurt Busch hit a large section of cardboard on the back stretch, stopping the session after an hour.

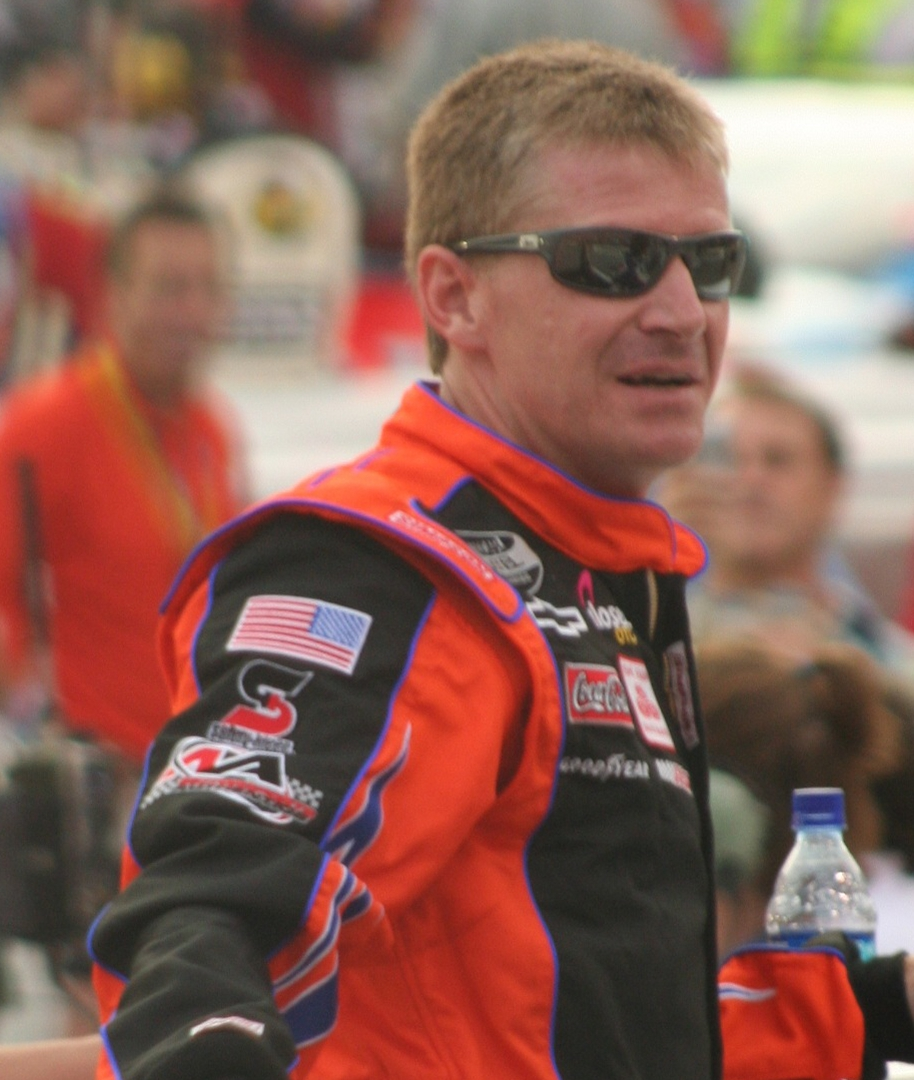
Jeff Burton (pictured in 2007) had the third pole position of his career and his first since 2000.

On February 12, 58 cars ran two qualifying laps for 43 slots in the race. Unlike most races throughout the season, qualifying set the first two positions. The remaining drivers had to qualify through the 2006 Gatorade Duels, in which 37 drivers were assigned mostly based on where they finished. Three remaining drivers were chosen through their qualifying speed, and one prior series champion qualified with a champions' provisional. The weather was cold with a tailwind. Jeff Burton was the 34th driver to set a lap time; he took his first pole position at Daytona International Speedway, his first since the 2000 Chevrolet Monte Carlo 400, and the third of his career with a time of 47.581 seconds. He was joined on the grid's front row by Gordon who was 0.169 seconds slower. Kenseth was the only driver to not set a time due to a flat left-rear tire to start his lap. After qualifying, Burton said, "We just got lucky. That's the best wind we've had down here in all of testing and everything else. It just played into our hands, and we had a car that could take advantage of it.", and, "Today had nothing to do with me. The only impact that I had on today at all was to be a warm-blooded person that could mash the gas and turn the thing on. I think Michael Waltrip once said a drunk monkey could do it, and I was a drunk monkey, I guess."

Following post-qualifying inspection, Johnson's lap times were deleted due to an illegal rear window template lowered by a track bar adjuster to the right rear of his vehicle, giving Johnson an aerodynamic advantage. Terry Labonte's lap times were also invalidated after it was found that his car's carburetor had non-sanctioned modifications. Both Johnson and Labonte were ordered to start from the rear of the field in the Gatorade Duels. NASCAR did not confiscate Johnson's primary car, and his crew corrected the infraction to let it to compete again. NASCAR ejected Johnson's crew chief Chad Knaus from the Daytona 500, which was unappealable. Knaus was replaced by Hendrick Motorsports lead engineer Darian Grubb.

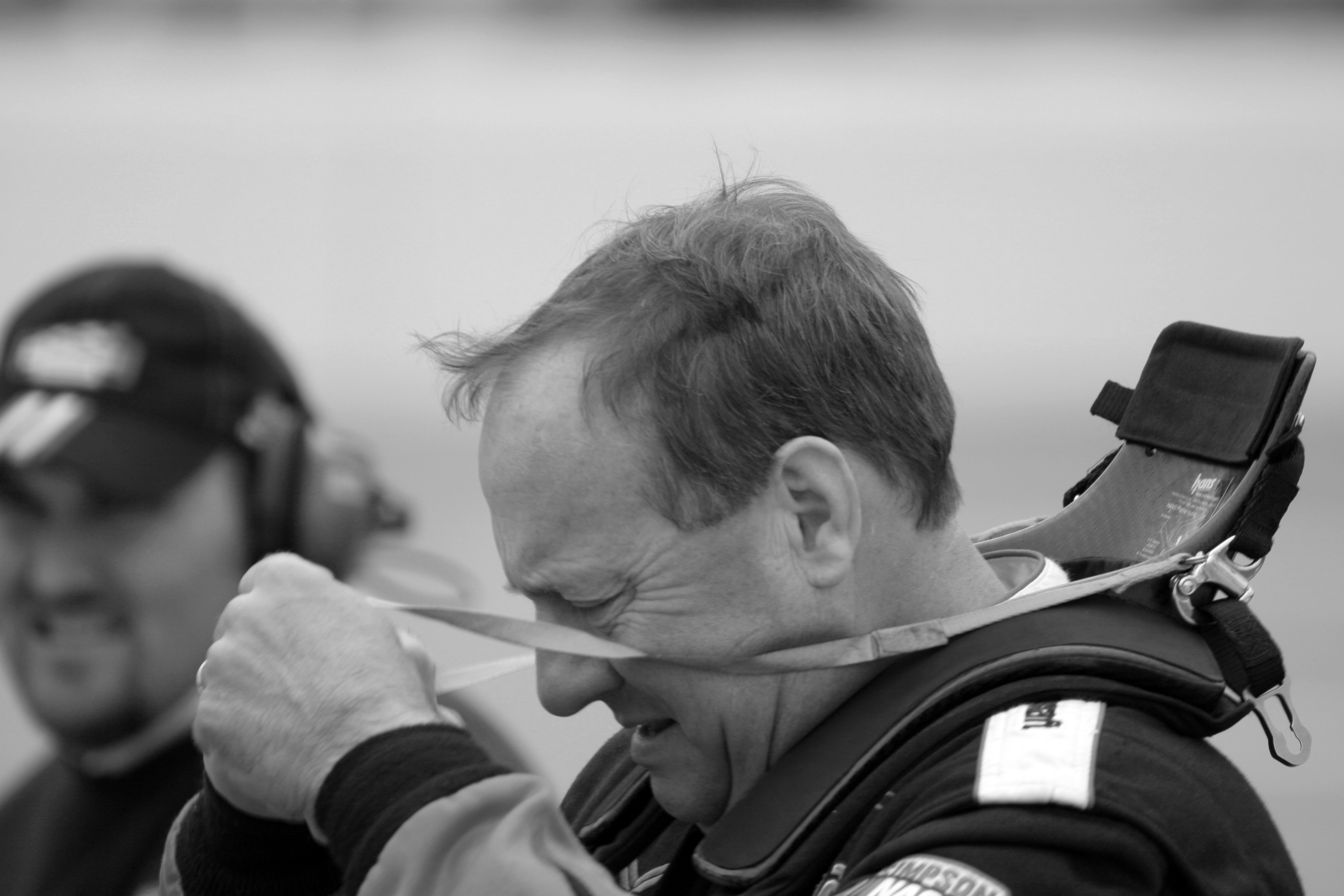
Ken Schrader (pictured in 2007) set the fastest practice lap in all six sessions on Saturday afternoon.

In the third practice session, Dale Earnhardt Jr. led with a 47.024 seconds lap, ahead of Kenseth, Ryan Newman, Kevin Lepage, Scott Wimmer, Jeff Green. Kurt Busch, David Stremme, Burton, and Jamie McMurray. Petty and Kenny Wallace had anxious moments drafting other cars; both drivers were able to control their vehicles. Both Hamlin and Derrike Cope hit a wall beside the track; they continued with no major car damage. Brian Vickers led the fourth practice session with a 46.946 seconds time, with Mike Wallace, Greg Biffle, Jarrett, Kenseth, Bowyer, Robby Gordon, Burton, Chad Chaffin and Dave Blaney in positions two to ten. Mike Wallace had a tire detach and his oil line failed 15 minutes into the session.

Sadler and Jeff Gordon won the Gatorade Duels. The qualifying grid was finalized with Sadler, Kyle Busch, Carl Edwards, McMurray, Earnhardt, Bobby Labonte, Johnson and Mark Martin completing the top ten starters. Travis Kvapil, Hermie Sadler, and Kirk Shelmerdine were the final three drivers to qualify based on their qualifying speed. Terry Labonte began the race on a champions' provisional. Riggs, Kenny Wallace, Wimmer, Mike Skinner, Cope, Larry Gunselman, Chad Blount, Larry Foyt, Andy Belmont, Randy LaJoie, Morgan Shepherd, Chaffin, Carl Long, Paul Menard, and Stanton Barrett were the 15 drivers who did not qualify. Marlin went to a backup car after being involved in a collision in the first qualifying race. Nemechek's team changed his engine after it failed in the second qualifier.

Stremme paced the fifth practice session with a 47.038 seconds, 0.001 seconds faster than Robby Gordon in second. Harvick, Green, Elliott, Ken Schrader, McMurray, Kasey Kahne, Earnhardt and Kurt Busch followed in the top ten. In the final practice session, which took place in warm weather and saw drivers limit their running to preserve their cars, Schrader lapped fastest overall at 46.708 seconds; Martin Truex Jr., Earnhardt, Green, Lepage, Jarrett, Marlin, Petty, Burton, and Brent Sherman completed the top ten. The session passed without major incident. Bobby Labonte's engine failed late in practice, and his team changed engines. Vickers glanced the turn three wall and resumed without major car damage.

=== Qualifying results ===
Grid	Car	Driver	Team	Manufacturer	Reason
1	31	Jeff Burton	Richard Childress Racing	Chevrolet	Pole Winner
2	24	Jeff Gordon	Hendrick Motorsports	Chevrolet	Outside Pole Winner and Duel 2 Winner
3	38	Elliott Sadler	Robert Yates Racing	Ford	Duel 1 Winner
4	5	Kyle Busch	Hendrick Motorsports	Chevrolet	Second in Duel 2
5	99	Carl Edwards	Roush Racing	Ford	Second in Duel 1
6	26	Jamie McMurray	Roush Racing	Ford	Third in Duel 2
7	8	Dale Earnhardt Jr.	Dale Earnhardt, Inc.	Chevrolet	Third in Duel 1
8	43	Bobby Labonte	Petty Enterprises	Dodge	Fourth in Duel 2^{1}
9	48	Jimmie Johnson	Hendrick Motorsports	Chevrolet	Fourth in Duel 1
10	6	Mark Martin	Roush Racing	Ford	Fifth in Duel 2
11	17	Matt Kenseth	Roush Racing	Ford	Fifth in Duel 1
12	45	Kyle Petty	Petty Enterprises	Dodge	Sixth in Duel 2
13	2	Kurt Busch	Penske Racing South	Dodge	Sixth in Duel 1
14	42	Casey Mears	Chip Ganassi Racing	Dodge	Seventh in Duel 2
15	20	Tony Stewart	Joe Gibbs Racing	Chevrolet	Eighth in Duel 1
16	16	Greg Biffle	Roush Racing	Ford	Eighth in Duel 2
17	11	Denny Hamlin	Joe Gibbs Racing	Chevrolet	Ninth in Duel 1
18	12	Ryan Newman	Penske Racing South	Dodge	Ninth in Duel 2
19	1	Martin Truex Jr.	Dale Earnhardt, Inc.	Chevrolet	Tenth in Duel 1
20	7	Robby Gordon	Robby Gordon Motorsports	Chevrolet	Transfer 1 in Duel 1
21	66	Jeff Green	Haas CNC Racing	Chevrolet	Eleventh in Duel 1
22	41	Reed Sorenson	Chip Ganassi Racing	Dodge	Eleventh in Duel 2
23	21	Ken Schrader	Wood Brothers Racing	Ford	Twelfth in Duel 2
24	09	Mike Wallace	Phoenix Racing	Dodge	Transfer 2 in Duel 1
25	88	Dale Jarrett	Robert Yates Racing	Ford	Thirteenth in Duel 1
26	19	Jeremy Mayfield	Evernham Motorsports	Dodge	Fifteenth in Duel 2
27	9	Kasey Kahne	Evernham Motorsports	Dodge	Fourteenth in Duel 1
28	29	Kevin Harvick	Richard Childress Racing	Chevrolet	Sixteenth in Duel 1
29	49	Brent Sherman	BAM Racing	Dodge	Fifteenth in Duel 1
30	55	Michael Waltrip	Waltrip-Jasper Racing	Dodge	Nineteenth in Duel 1
31	61	Kevin Lepage	Peak Fitness Racing	Ford	Transfer 2 in Duel 1
32	40	David Stremme	Chip Ganassi Racing	Dodge	Twentieth in Duel 2
33	36	Bill Elliott	MB2 Motorsports	Chevrolet	Transfer 2 in Duel 1
34	22	Dave Blaney	Bill Davis Racing	Dodge	Twenty-third in Duel 2
35	25	Brian Vickers	Hendrick Motorsports	Chevrolet	Twentieth in Duel 1
36	18	J. J. Yeley	Joe Gibbs Racing	Chevrolet	Twenty-fourth in Duel 2
37	07	Clint Bowyer	Richard Childress Racing	Chevrolet	Twenty-first in Duel 1
38	01	Joe Nemechek	MB2 Motorsports	Chevrolet	Twenty-ninth in Duel 2^{1}
39	14	Sterling Marlin	MB2 Motorsports	Chevrolet	Twenty-sixth in Duel 1^{1}
40	32	Travis Kvapil	PPI Motorsports	Chevrolet	Speed – 187.106
41	00	Hermie Sadler	MBA Racing	Ford	Speed – 187.025
42	27	Kirk Shelmerdine	Kirk Shelmerdine Racing	Chevrolet	Speed – 185.361
43	96	Terry Labonte	Hall of Fame Racing	Chevrolet	Champion's Provisional
Failed to qualify
44	10	Scott Riggs	Evernham Motorsports	Dodge	Speed – 180.890
45	78	Kenny Wallace	Furniture Row Racing	Chevrolet	Speed – 181.594
46	4	Scott Wimmer	Morgan–McClure Motorsports	Chevrolet	Speed – 184.854
47	23	Mike Skinner	Bill Davis Racing	Dodge	Speed – 182.771
48	74	Derrike Cope	McGlynn Racing	Dodge	Speed – 183.333
49	52	Larry Gunselman	Rick Ware Racing	Dodge	Speed – 181.214
50	37	Chad Blount	R&J Racing	Dodge	Speed – 181.906
51	50	Larry Foyt	Arnold Motorsports	Dodge	Speed – 185.128
52	59	Andy Belmont	Andy Belmont Racing	Chevrolet	Speed – 179.960
53	64	Randy LaJoie	Front Row Motorsports	Chevrolet	Speed – 184.540
54	89	Morgan Shepherd	Shepherd Racing Ventures	Dodge	Speed – 183.576
55	92	Chad Chaffin	Front Row Motorsports	Chevrolet	Speed – 181.763
56	80	Carl Long	Hover Motorsports	Ford	Speed – 176.935
57	15	Paul Menard	Dale Earnhardt, Inc.	Chevrolet	Speed – 185.334
58	95	Stanton Barrett	Stanton Barrett Motorsports	Chevrolet	Speed – 185.322
^{1} Moved to the back of the field for changing engines (#01, 43) and for changing to a back-up car (#14)

== Race ==
At 9:00 a.m., Nemechek's engine compartment caught fire after oil-covered tire rubber in his exhaust header ignited, requiring his team to replace the wiring harness and the aluminum heat shield beside the engine's header. Live television coverage began at 1:30 pm EDT in the United States on NBC. Around the start of the race, the weather was overcast and cool; forecasts predicted an air temperature of 65 °F (18 °C) and cloudy conditions. Ronald Durham, pastor of Greater Friendship Missionary Baptist Church in Daytona Beach, Florida, began pre-race ceremonies with an invocation. Hip-hop singer Fergie of the Black Eyed Peas performed the national anthem, and actor James Caan commanded the drivers to start their engines. During the pace laps, Bobby Labonte and Nemechek moved to the rear of the field because they changed their engines. Marlin did the same after going to a back-up car.

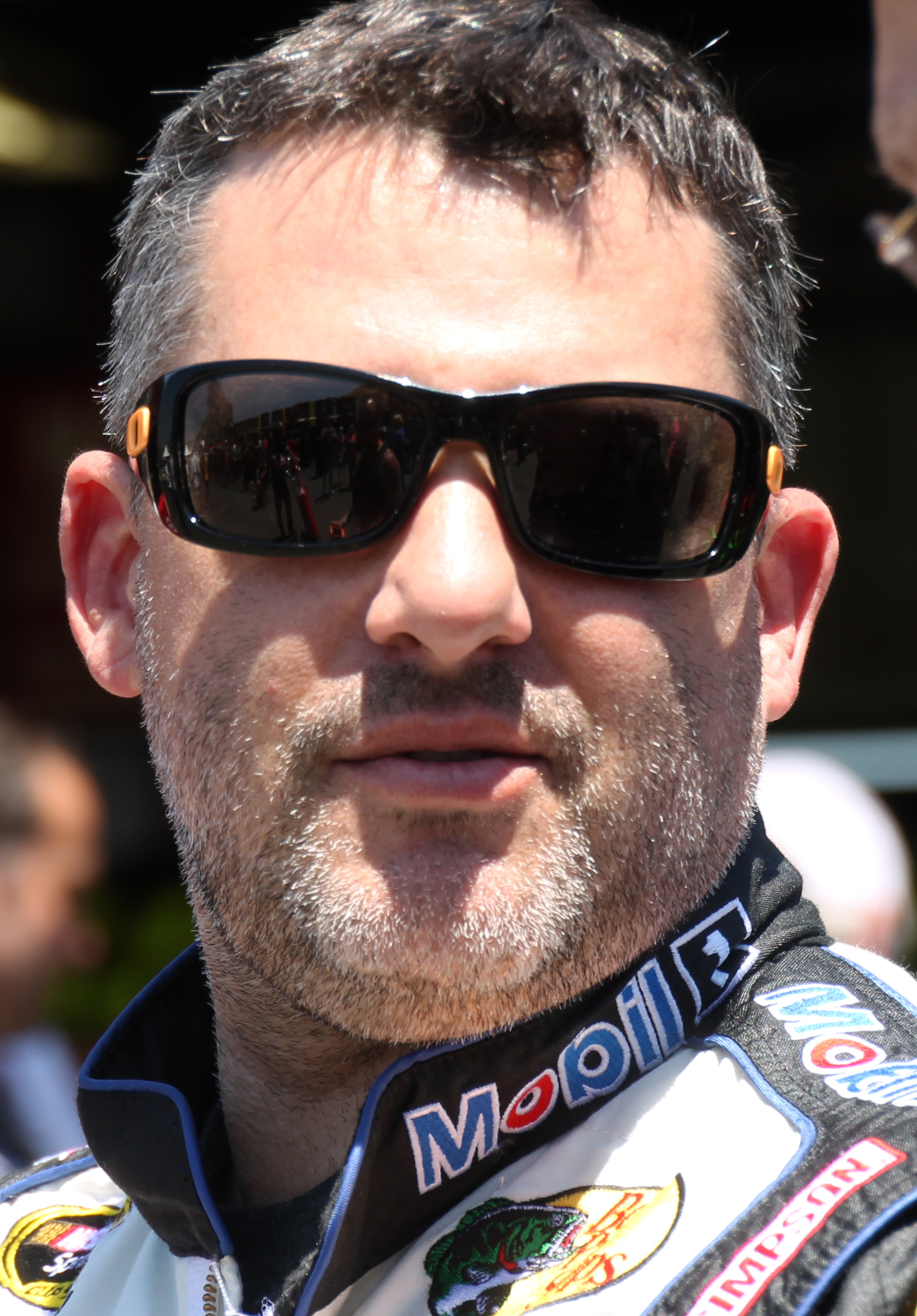
Tony Stewart (pictured in 2015) led 20 laps and was later penalized for contact with Matt Kenseth on lap 107.

The race began at 2:45 pm. Burton maintained the lead over the field into the first turn. In turn three, Green's left-rear tire went flat; no caution was prompted because the carcass rolled into the infield grass. By lap three, two different packs of cars had formed; 27 cars were in the lead pack, and the rest were five seconds behind. Earnhardt made it three abreast through the tri-oval on the fifth lap; it returned to two abreast into the back straightaway. Harvick moved from 26th to ninth by lap nine, while Petty dropped 17 positions over the same distance. The top three cars established a single file on lap 15, with the next six rows two abreast. Two laps later, the first caution was given; Truex served to avoid Vickers when he lost control of his car exiting turn two. Vickers collided with the right-hand side wall, causing his car's right-side sheet metal to rub against the right rear tire. During the caution, the field (including Burton), made pit stops for fuel and tires. Sadler led Earnhardt at the lap 21 restart.

One lap later, Earnhardt went right to unsuccessfully attempt a pass on Sadler without drafting assistance but fell back. Jeff Gordon took the lead on lap 24th, as Sadler fell to fourth. On lap 25, Kenseth overtook Gordon for first, with Earnhardt second and Stewart third. Earnhardt passed Kenseth for the lead two laps later, as Stewart got loose in turn two and slid up towards Kenseth; he regained control of his car. McMurray gave Stewart drafting assistance in passing Earnhardt for first on the 28th lap. Six laps later, Mike Wallace collided with Mayfield, went into Biffle; no caution was issued. Mayfield entered pit road for repairs on the lap. He made a second pit stop on lap 38 because a fender cut his right-front tire. On lap 40, Stewart remained first, with McMurray second. Mayfield made a third pit stop for sheet metal repairs on the next lap.

On the 48th lap, just after Stewart lost the lead to McMurray, Gordon lost control of his vehicle and collided with Stewart's front. Both drivers were sent into the right-hand wall leaving the second turn and incurred right-side damage. The field (including McMurray) made pit stops under caution. McMurray was dropped off his team's jack, causing metal sheet damage, and Edwards had front-end repairs made. As fog fell between turns one and three, restricting visibility, Newman led at the lap 52 restart, followed by Kenseth. Six laps later, Kyle Busch helped Kenseth take the lead from Newman. Kyle Busch lost positions from lap 61, while Kurt Busch moved to third. By the 75th lap, Stewart returned to 13th place. Four laps later, a multi-car collision caused a third caution. Green's car slid upward into J. J. Yeley's path in turn three after colliding with Jarrett, collecting Nemechek. The front of Edwards' car briefly mounted Petty's left-side fender before both drivers slid into the infield grass at turn three.

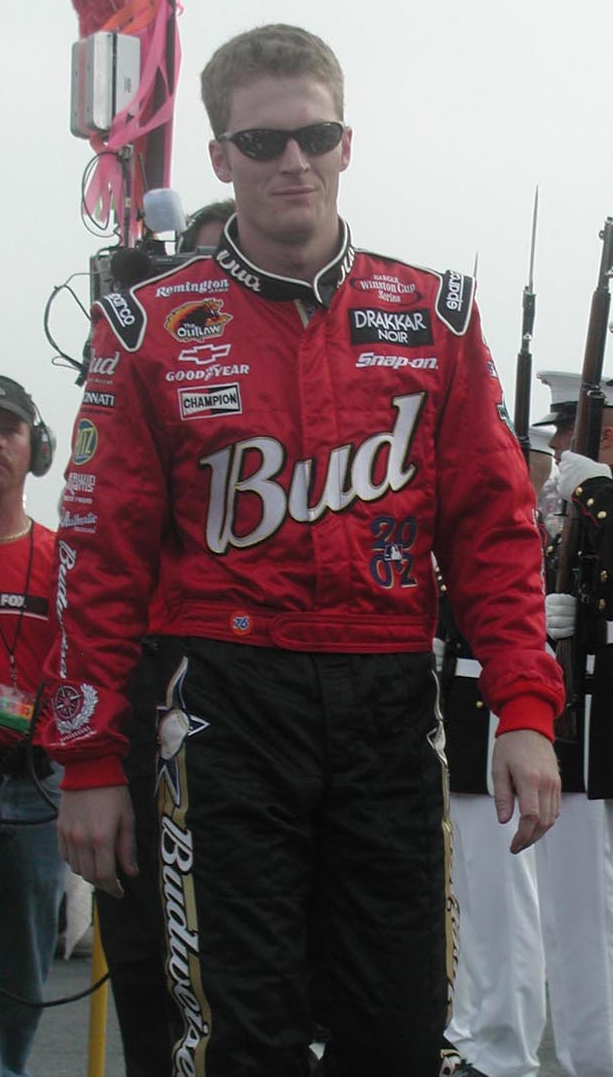
Dale Earnhardt Jr. (pictured in 2002) led more laps than any other driver in the Daytona 500 (32).

The leaders (including Kenseth) made pit stops under caution. Kurt Busch and Travis Kvapil both staggered their pit stops, leading one lap before their stops. Racing resumed on lap 85 with Kenseth leading and Harvick in second. That lap, as the field spread out in turns one and two, Harvick passed Kenseth for the lead. Earnhardt turned left and exploited Nemechek's slower car to pass Harvick for the first position on lap 86. Four laps later, Kenseth received drafting assistance from Kurt Busch to recover first place from Harvick on the outside. A fourth caution was prompted when a spring rubber was located on track during lap 91. The leaders (including Kenseth) made pit stops during the caution. Earnhardt led at the lap 96 restart. Entering turn three on the lap, Kenseth overtook Johnson for second. On the 104th lap, Martin used Stewart's drafting to pass Earnhardt on the outside for the lead.

The fifth caution was waved on lap 107. Stewart went left and hit the front of Kenseth's car into turn three. This sent Kenseth into the infield grass and backward onto the track in turn three, where he hit no other cars before glancing the wall. The field (including Martin) entered pit road during the caution. Earnhardt took the lead after all cars made their pit stops. Meanwhile, Stewart was sent to the end of the longest line for "aggressive driving". As Stewart and Kenseth exited pit road, Kenseth went to the outside into turn one and collided with Stewart's right-hand quarter. NASCAR ordered Kenseth to serve a drive-through penalty. The race resumed on lap 112, with Earnhardt leading a lap before Biffle overtook him. Kenseth disputed his penalty and remained on track until the 114th lap. Earnhardt retook the lead for two laps, before Kyle Busch led laps 116 and 120 until Johnson passed him on lap 121. On lap 124, Robby Gordon's right-front tire failed in turn three, and he hit the wall, triggering the sixth caution.

The field (including Johnson) entered pit road under caution. Elliott led the field on lap 126 before his pit stop. Stewart drove over his pit stall jack, and was ordered to drop to the end of the nearest longest line. Martin led at the lap 129 restart, followed by Johnson. That lap, Johnson unsuccessfully tried to pass Martin on the outside. Martin pulled away with drafting aid from Earnhardt, and the top six had formed a single line by lap 132. Earnhardt reclaimed the lead ten laps later, and Vickers passed teammate Johnson on the outside on lap 143. Vickers took the lead on the next lap. Lap 155 saw the seventh caution; debris was located in the frontstretch groove. All of the leaders including Vickers made pit stops under caution. Johnson went onto the grass to avoid hitting Newman. Earnhardt led Vickers and Newman at the lap 160 restart. Newman passed Earnhardt on the outside for the lead four laps later, which Earnhardt retook momentarily. Kurt Busch moved to second on lap 167.

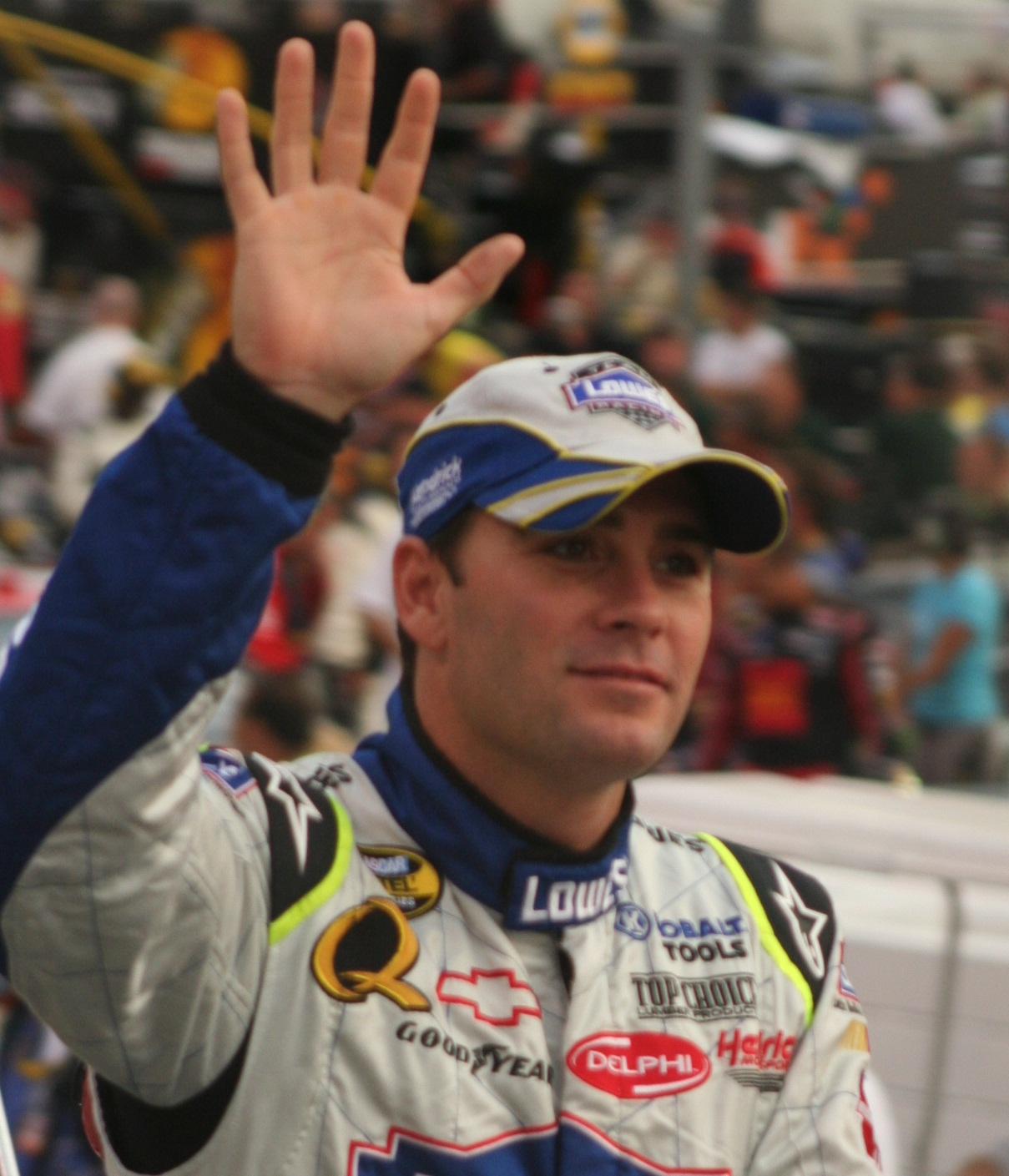
Jimmie Johnson (pictured in 2007) led 24 laps and took his first Daytona 500 victory and the 19th of his career.

Kahne helped Earnhardt move to second on lap 171. Kvapil's right front tire burst five laps later, sending him into the turn three right-hand wall and prompting the eighth caution. During the caution, all cars including Newman entered pit road. Vickers led at the lap 181 restart with no new tires on his car. Every driver, except for Kyle Busch and Kurt Busch, turned onto the inside. Just as Johnson overtook his teammate Vickers on the outside in turn two for the lead with Newman's help, the ninth caution was waved on the 187th lap. McMurray collided with Kurt Busch's left-rear on the backstretch after exiting turn two, sending Busch into a barrier. Marlin and Jeff Gordon were collected, and debris struck Stewart's car. Johnson maintained the lead at the lap 190 restart. Newman bump drafted Vickers for two laps, before passing him for second, and attempted to challenge Johnson. Casey Mears then overtook Vickers for third.

Johnson led the next seven laps before an accident brought out the tenth caution flag. Burton slid up the backstretch and hit McMurray, leading Burton to collide with the wall. Burton collided with Bobby Labonte's right side, causing both cars to strike the wall, and Labonte collected Hamlin. During the caution, one of Newman's mechanics pleaded with representatives from Mears' and Sadler's teams to help Newman on the outside for the restart. Both declined because of the chance to win the race. The race restarted on the 202nd lap for a green–white–checkered finish extending it to 203 laps, with Johnson leading Newman and Mears. The trio drew clear from the field. Strong runs from Sadler and Earnhardt closed them up to the top three.

Earnhardt attempted to gain positions by turning right on the final lap, but fell back. Then, Newman attempted to pass Johnson on the outside; Mears remained with Johnson instead of drafting Newman. Biffle spun and hit the turn four wall, causing the eleventh (and final) caution. The field was frozen in place, with the finish order determined by where the drivers were when the caution began. This gave Johnson his maiden Daytona 500 victory, his first at either Talladega Superspeedway and Daytona International Speedway, and the 19th of his career. Mears, Newman, Sadler, Stewart, Bowyer, Vickers, Earnhardt, Schrader, and Jarrett completed the top ten finishers. There were 11 cautions and 32 lead changes among a record-setting 18 different drivers during the race. Earnhardt led the most laps of any racer (32). Johnson led four times totaling 24 laps.

=== Post-race ===
"The racer in me wanted to push and be aggressive out there. And there were so many times I just told myself to stop. Don't get caught up in this. I really did a lot of talking to myself. And ultimately I hope that I learned something today that will help me win a championship. In my eyes, I wonder if I've been trying too hard and this team's been trying too hard. If we just sit down and be calm and relaxed, do our job 100 percent, that we will accomplish what we want to."

— Jimmie Johnson, on winning the 48th Daytona 500.

Johnson appeared in Victory Lane to celebrate his first Daytona 500 victory in front of a crowd of 200,000 spectators; the win earned him $1,505,124. He believed his team would win without Knaus and dedicated it to his detractors, saying, "I just have so much pride in my team with the circumstances that we've faced this week. Chad made a mistake and we're dealing with the consequences that come with that. But I think this shows how hard we work to be successful, and nobody can deny the fact that we worked out butts off and won the sport's biggest race." Mears said he was happy to be second, the fifth top-five finish of his career, "These races are so hard to get good finishes in [because] so many people can affect the outcome. Obviously we would have liked to have won [because] it would have forced Chip and Felix [Sabates, team co-owner] to put me in the Indy 500, which would have been a lot of fun. At the end of the day, it was a good finish for us, we had an excellent day and I couldn't be happier – unless we won." Third-placed Newman told Mears after the race, "You cost me a million dollars". He said he was proud to attempt a pass for the win, "I told the guys over the radio afterward, if I had that run and didn't take it, I would have had a hard time sleeping tonight – probably for the next 10 or 15 years, maybe – you never know."

Regarding whether Johnson would be allowed to keep the victory, Johnson was declared the winner several hours later after his car passed post-race inspection. Newman noted three of Johnson's previous wins came under scrutiny from NASCAR, adding, "This could still be the first opportunity for NASCAR to pull away a victory if the thing is illegal, I think a lot of Jimmie Johnson and his talent ... but I'm pretty sure that three of his past four wins have had conflict with the cars being illegal. It's not necessarily good for the sport." Johnson responded by criticizing Newman's crew chief Matt Borland and said that he would defend himself and Hendrick Motorsports against personal criticism. Mears believed Johnson earned the victory, "In my mind, the fact that they got caught earlier in the week took away every doubt in my mind that they'd actually do anything to cheat in this race." Hendrick Motorsports founder and owner Rick Hendrick declared Knaus' ejection from the race as unimportant, commenting, "We've been through inspection I don't know how many times. NASCAR did what they did, and we came back and ran two races. That was history."

Two days after the race, NASCAR announced penalties for Hendrick Motorsports and Hall of Fame Racing. Hendrick Motorsport's penalties for "actions detrimental to stock car racing", and for making an unapproved template modification to Johnson's rear window, included a $25,000 fine for Knaus, who was suspended from NASCAR until March 22, 2006. Knaus was also placed on probation until December 31, 2006; Johnson did not incur a points penalty. The team did not appeal the penalties and Grubb continued in Knaus' role until the Golden Corral 500. Hall of Fame Racing's penalties were for "actions detrimental to stock car racing", and for having a non-compliant carburetor in accordance to the 2006 NASCAR Rule Book. Crew chief Philippe Lopez was fined $25,000, and Terry Labonte and team owner Bill Saunders were penalized 25 points in the Drivers' and Owners' Championships. Hall of Fame Racing and its partner Joe Gibbs Racing announced they would appeal their penalties. The appeal was heard before a three-member National Stock Car Racing Commission on March 7 at NASCAR's Research & Development Center in Concord, North Carolina. The penalties were upheld. Hall of Fame Racing decided not to appeal further to Charles D. Strang, the NASCAR National Commissioner.

Kenseth said Stewart purposefully eliminated him from contention on lap 107. He was disenchanted with him, and urged NASCAR to address bump drafting, "There's no two ways about it. He was mad because earlier in the race when I passed him he got loose, which I didn't think I did anything wrong." Stewart argued Kenseth caused the crash, "I guess Matt didn't think anything when he got me sideways over in (Turn) 2, either. He should have thought about that first. He got back what he started in the first place. I got penalized for that." McMurray commented on his accident with Kurt Busch on lap 187, "I need to apologize to Kurt. I got into him, that was 100 percent my fault and I feel really bad because he had a car capable of winning and I kind of screwed that up for him." Earnhardt, who led the most laps of any driver with 32, said he was pleased to finish ninth, "We had a great race car, built by all the technology and resources at DEI. ... We came down here and ran great. That's what we wanted to do. I'm real proud of everybody back at the shop and all my guys down here that have been working on this car all week. It's been a long week."

Johnson led the Drivers' Championship with 185 points after the season's first race, with Mears and Newman tied for second with 170 points. The top ten were completed by Sadler, Stewart, Earnhardt, Vickers, Bowyer, Schrader, and Jarrett. Johnson won his first of five races of the 2006 season and took his first of seven NASCAR Cup Series championships at the season's end. Chevrolet led the Manufacturers' Championship with nine points, Dodge was in second with six points, and Ford followed in third with four points. The race attracted 19.355 million viewers; it took 3 hours, 33 minutes, and 26 seconds to complete; because it ended under caution, no margin of victory was recorded.

=== Race results ===
Pos	Grid	Car	Driver	Team	Manufacturer	Laps	Points
1	9	48	Jimmie Johnson	Hendrick Motorsports	Chevrolet	203	185^{1}
2	14	42	Casey Mears	Chip Ganassi Racing	Dodge	203	170
3	18	12	Ryan Newman	Penske Racing South	Dodge	203	170^{1}
4	3	38	Elliott Sadler	Robert Yates Racing	Ford	203	165^{1}
5	15	20	Tony Stewart	Joe Gibbs Racing	Chevrolet	203	160^{1}
6	37	07	Clint Bowyer	Richard Childress Racing	Chevrolet	203	150
7	35	25	Brian Vickers	Hendrick Motorsports	Chevrolet	203	151^{1}
8	7	8	Dale Earnhardt Jr.	Dale Earnhardt, Inc.	Chevrolet	203	152^{2}
9	23	21	Ken Schrader	Wood Brothers Racing	Ford	203	138
10	25	88	Dale Jarrett	Robert Yates Racing	Ford	203	134
11	27	9	Kasey Kahne	Evernham Motorsports	Dodge	203	130
12	10	6	Mark Martin	Roush Racing	Ford	203	132^{1}
13	20	7	Robby Gordon	Robby Gordon Motorsports	Chevrolet	203	124
14	28	29	Kevin Harvick	Richard Childress Racing	Chevrolet	203	126^{1}
15	11	17	Matt Kenseth	Roush Racing	Ford	203	123^{1}
16	19	1	Martin Truex Jr.	Dale Earnhardt Inc.	Chevrolet	203	115
17	43	96	Terry Labonte	Hall of Fame Racing	Chevrolet	203	87^{3}
18	30	55	Michael Waltrip	Waltrip-Jasper Racing	Dodge	203	109
19	33	36	Bill Elliott	MB2 Motorsports	Chevrolet	203	111^{1}
20	42	27	Kirk Shelmerdine	Kirk Shelmerdine Racing	Chevrolet	203	103
21	29	49	Brent Sherman	BAM Racing	Dodge	203	100
22	34	22	Dave Blaney	Bill Davis Racing	Dodge	203	97
23	4	5	Kyle Busch	Hendrick Motorsports	Chevrolet	203	99^{1}
24	24	09	Mike Wallace	Phoenix Racing	Dodge	203	91
25	31	61	Kevin Lepage	Peak Fitness Racing	Ford	203	93^{1}
26	2	24	Jeff Gordon	Hendrick Motorsports	Chevrolet	203	90^{1}
27	40	32	Travis Kvapil	PPI Motorsports	Chevrolet	203	87^{1}
28	32	40	David Stremme	Chip Ganassi Racing	Dodge	203	79
29	22	41	Reed Sorenson	Chip Ganassi Racing	Dodge	203	76
30	17	11	Denny Hamlin	Joe Gibbs Racing	Chevrolet	203	73
31	16	16	Greg Biffle	Roush Racing	Ford	203	75^{1}
32	1	31	Jeff Burton	Richard Childress Racing	Chevrolet	202	72^{1}
33	38	01	Joe Nemechek	MB2 Motorsports	Chevrolet	200	64
34	39	14	Sterling Marlin	MB2 Motorsports	Chevrolet	200	61
35	8	43	Bobby Labonte	Petty Enterprises	Dodge	197	58
36	26	19	Jeremy Mayfield	Evernham Motorsports	Dodge	197	55
37	6	26	Jamie McMurray	Roush Racing	Ford	196	57^{1}
38	13	2	Kurt Busch	Penske Racing South	Dodge	187	54^{1}
39	12	45	Kyle Petty	Petty Enterprises	Dodge	173	46
40	41	00	Hermie Sadler	MBA Racing	Ford	169	43
41	36	18	J. J. Yeley	Joe Gibbs Racing	Chevrolet	157	40
42	21	66	Jeff Green	Haas CNC Racing	Chevrolet	156	37
43	5	99	Carl Edwards	Roush Racing	Ford	78	34
^{1} Includes five bonus points for leading a lap
^{2} Includes ten bonus points for leading the most laps
^{3} Includes a 25-point post-race penalty

== Standings after the race ==
Drivers' Championship standings

Pos	Driver	Points
1	Jimmie Johnson	185
2	Casey Mears	170 (−15)
3	Ryan Newman	170 (−15)
4	Elliott Sadler	165 (−20)
5	Tony Stewart	160 (−25)
6	Dale Earnhardt Jr.	152 (−33)
7	Brian Vickers	151 (−34)
8	Clint Bowyer	150 (−35)
9	Ken Schrader	138 (−47)
10	Dale Jarrett	134 (−51)

Manufacturers' Championship standings

Pos	Manufacturer	Points
1	Chevrolet	9
2	Dodge	6 (−3)
3	Ford	4 (−5)

- Note: Only the top five positions are included for the driver standings.

== Notes and references ==
=== References ===
Previous race: 2005 Ford 400	Nextel Cup Series; 2006 season	Next race: 2006 Auto Club 500
