= 2006 Subway 500 =

NASCAR stock car race

Race details
- Race 32 of 36 in the 2006 NASCAR Nextel Cup Series
- 2006 Subway 500 program cover
- Date: October 22, 2006
- Location: Martinsville Speedway, Ridgeway, Virginia, US
- Course: Permanent racing facility
- Course length: 0.526 miles (0.85 km)
- Distance: 500 laps, 263 mi (423 km)
- Weather: Temperatures up to 66.2 °F (19.0 °C); wind speeds up to 5.10 miles per hour (8.21 km/h)
- Average speed: 70.446 mph (113.372 km/h)

Pole position
Driver	Kurt Busch	Penske Racing South
- Time: 19.408

Most laps led
Driver	Jimmie Johnson	Hendrick Motorsports
- Laps: 245

Winner
No. 48	Jimmie Johnson	Hendrick Motorsports

Television in the United States
- Network: NBC
- Announcers: Bill Weber, Benny Parsons, Wally Dallenbach Jr.
- Nielsen ratings: 4.1/9 (Final); 3.5/7 (Overnight)

Radio in the United States
- Radio: Motor Racing Network
- Booth announcers: Joe Moore, Barney Hall
- Turn announcers: Mike Bagley, Dan Hubbard, Dave Moody, Jeff Striegle

The 2006 Subway 500 was the 32nd stock car race of the 2006 NASCAR Nextel Cup Series and the sixth in the ten-race Chase for the Nextel Cup. It was held on October 22, 2006, before a crowd of 65,000, at Martinsville Speedway in Ridgeway, Virginia, United States. Hendrick Motorsports driver Jimmie Johnson won the 500‑lap race starting from the ninth position; Denny Hamlin of Joe Gibbs Racing finished second, and Bobby Labonte of Petty Enterprises was third.

Jeff Burton was the driver who led the Drivers' Championship going into the race with a 45-point margin over Matt Kenseth in second. Kurt Busch won the pole position with the fastest lap time in qualifying. He was immediately passed by Jeff Gordon at the start of the race. Gordon held the lead for 143 laps, until Johnson took the lead for one lap. Gordon regained the lead on the next lap, only to lose it to Johnson again on the 153rd lap. Labonte moved into the lead on lap 406 and held it with 55 laps remaining when he was passed by Johnson. At the race's final restart on lap 495, Hamlin challenged Johnson for the lead, but the latter held off Hamlin's passing maneuver and won the race. There were 18 cautions and 16 lead changes by five different drivers during the race.

It was Johnson's fifth win of the 2006 season and the 23rd of his career. The result advanced him from to third in the Drivers' Championship, 41 points behind Kenseth (who took over the championship lead when Burton retired during the race; this caused Burton to fall to fifth in the championship, one point behind Hamlin). Chevrolet maintained its lead in the Manufacturers' Championship, 53 points ahead of Dodge, and 61 ahead of Ford with four races left in the season.

== Background ==
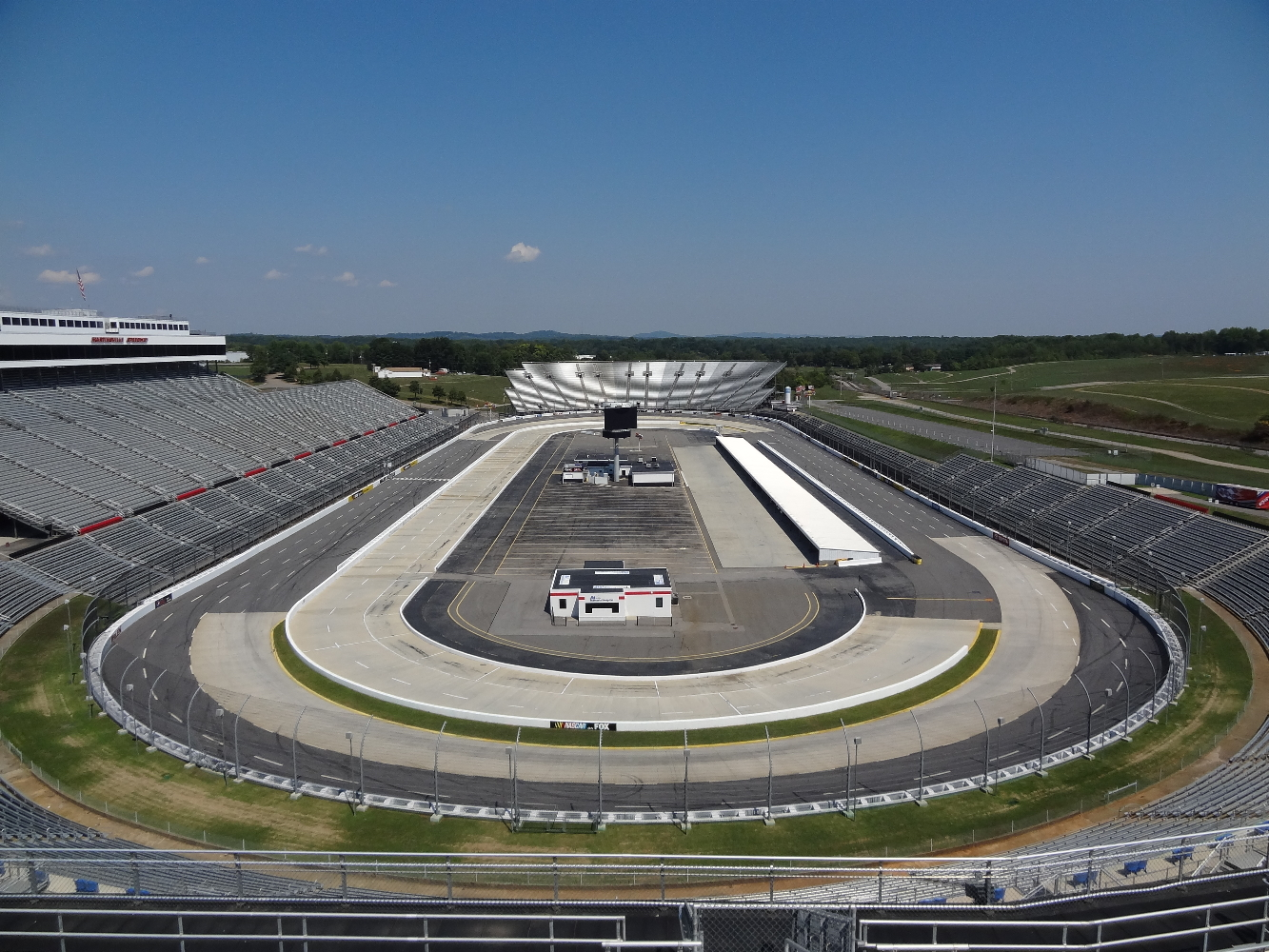
Martinsville Speedway

The Subway 500 was the 32nd of 36 scheduled stock car races of the 2006 NASCAR Nextel Cup Series and the sixth in the ten-race season-ending Chase for the Nextel Cup. On October 22, 2006, it was held at Martinsville Speedway in Ridgeway, Virginia, a short track that holds NASCAR races, and ran for a total of 500 laps over a distance of 263 mi (423 km). The standard track at Martinsville Speedway is a four-turn, paperclip-shaped 0.526-mile (0.847 km) oval. Its turns are banked at eleven degrees, and neither the front stretch (the location of the finish line) nor the backstretch is banked.

Before the race, Jeff Burton led the Drivers' Championship with 5,763 points, with Matt Kenseth second on 5,718 points and Kevin Harvick with 5,674 points in third. Mark Martin and Dale Earnhardt Jr. were fourth and fifth, and Denny Hamlin, Jimmie Johnson, Kasey Kahne, Kyle Busch and Jeff Gordon rounded out the top ten drivers competing for the 2006 Chase for the Nextel Cup. In the Manufacturers' Championship, Chevrolet led with 237 points; Dodge was second with 179, followed by Ford with 173. Gordon was the race's defending champion.

After falling from seventh to tenth in the Drivers' Championship at the previous race (at Charlotte Motor Speedway), Gordon said he would try and win races to return to contention for the championship. Jeff Burton called the Subway 500 "another volatile race in the Chase" and thought it would significantly impact the chase contenders. Although Kenseth felt the race would be the toughest for his team, he believed a good finish would put him in a better position for the championship because of his good results at the tracks following the Martinsville race. After a good finish at Charlotte, Earnhardt felt he was in "good shape": "Jeff has been at this a long time, but I don't look at him as indestructible. If he has a mistake or even a couple of bad runs, it will completely shake up the points." After winning the Busch Series championship, Harvick focused on the Nextel Cup championship: "We're excited about it, proud of what we've done this year, and, hopefully, we can do what we need to do on the Cup side in the next five weeks. I have never had a season like this." Hamlin thought he would perform well at Martinsville, where he felt comfortable. He and his team did not rule themselves out of contention for the title.

In preparation for the race, NASCAR held the last of its test days for Nextel Cup entrants on October 16–18 at Homestead–Miami Speedway. Sessions began at 1:00 p.m. Eastern Daylight Time (EDT), paused from 5:00 to 6:00 p.m., and concluded at 9:00 p.m. Fifty-eight cars, a mix of Cars of Tomorrow and 2006 cars, participated in the October 16 afternoon session. Reed Sorenson was quickest with a speed of 171.652 miles per hour (276.247 km/h), and Casey Mears had the highest speed of 173.077 miles per hour (278.540 km/h) in the evening session. During the third session (with 75 cars), Kyle Busch had the fastest speed of 175.382 miles per hour (282.250 km/h); Gordon had the highest speed of the three days, at 175.553 miles per hour (282.525 km/h) in the fourth session. During the fifth session, on the afternoon of October 18, 23 cars were tested. Scott Wimmer had the highest speed of 172.364 miles per hour (277.393 km/h), and Jeff Green had the highest speed of 174.639 miles per hour (281.054 km/h) in the evening session.

There were 50 cars represented by 3 different manufacturers entered for the race from a total of 29 teams. One team substituted for its regular driver. Morgan–McClure Motorsports driver Todd Bodine decided to concentrate on the Craftsman Truck Series title and was replaced by Ward Burton, the 2002 Daytona 500 champion. Burton, who had not raced since 2004, went to Motor Mile Speedway to reacquaint himself with NASCAR. According to crew chief Chris Carrier, Burton expressed a large amount of interest in driving at Martinsville: "He's a Virginia driver and we're a Virginia team. That makes for a great combination at Martinsville." On October 18, Roush Racing announced that Craftsman Truck Series driver David Ragan would drive the No. 06 car in four of the season's five remaining races beginning with the Subway 500. Ragan said the experience would help him prepare for his full-time début in 2007.

== Practice and qualification ==
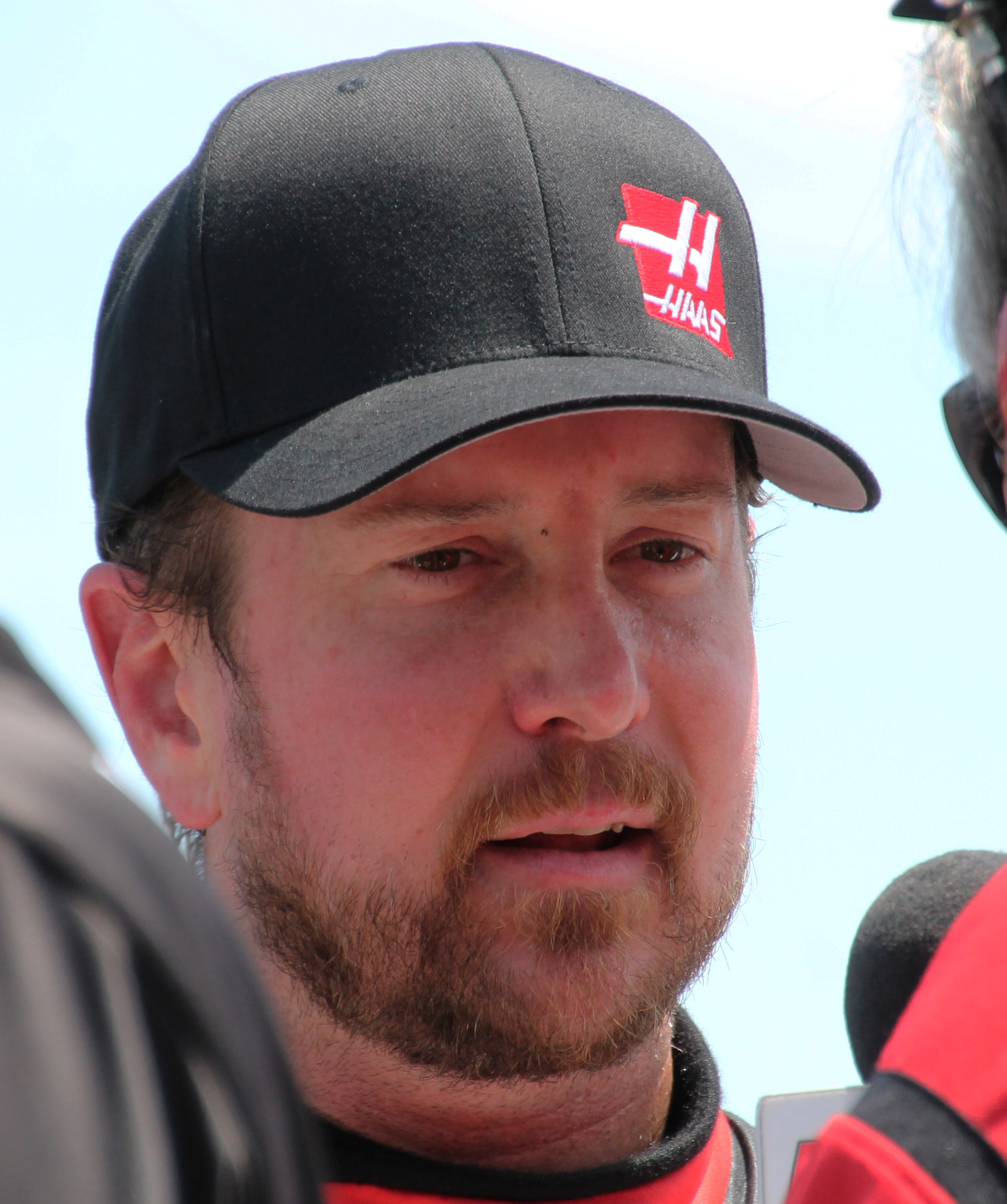
Kurt Busch (pictured in 2015) had the ninth pole position of his career.

Three practice sessions were held before the Sunday race: one on Friday and two on Saturday. The first session lasted 90 minutes, the second 60 minutes, and the third 45 minutes. In the first practice session, Gordon was fastest with a time of 19.478 seconds; Ryan Newman was second and Hamlin third. Johnson took fourth position, and Dave Blaney placed fifth. Kurt Busch, Sterling Marlin, Green, Sorenson, and Kahne rounded out the session's top ten drivers. Martin switched to a back-up car after he crashed.

Fifty cars entered qualifying on Friday afternoon, due to NASCAR's qualifying procedure, only forty-three could race. Each driver ran two laps, with the starting order determined by the competitor's fastest times. Kurt Busch clinched his sixth pole position of the season, the ninth of his career and his first at Martinsville, with a time of 19.408 seconds. He was joined on the grid's front row by Gordon, who was 0.038 seconds slower and had the pole position until Kurt Busch's lap. Hamlin qualified third, Newman fourth, and Tony Stewart fifth. Blaney was sixth, with Earnhardt and Green seventh and eighth. Johnson, a Chase for the Nextel Cup driver, qualified ninth, and Ken Schrader rounded out the top ten qualifiers. Harvick, another driver in the Chase, set the twelfth-fastest time. The seven drivers who failed to qualify were Mike Bliss, Hermie Sadler, Chad Chaffin, Morgan Shepherd, Ted Christopher, Derrike Cope, and Stanton Barrett. After the qualifier, Kurt Busch said, "It was a great lap, unexpected for me, but this team has always qualified well at this track, Martinsville is the kind of track that you either love or hate, and I've learned to do both. It's a tough, challenging short track."

On Saturday morning, Marlin was fastest in the second practice session with a time of 19.668 seconds. Positions two through ten were occupied by Kahne, Gordon, Dale Jarrett, Mears, Johnson, Hamlin, Brian Vickers, Greg Biffle, and Jeff Burton. Of the other drivers in the Chase, Kyle Busch was 13th-fastest and Martin 19th. During the second practice session, Scott Riggs had an engine failure in the session's opening minutes and changed engines. Later that day, Johnson led the final practice session with a 19.722 lap; Harvick, Biffle, Marlin, David Stremme, Hamlin. Earnhardt, Kyle Busch, Gordon, and Mears were in positions two to ten. Other Chase drivers included Jeff Burton in 17th and Kahne in 17th; all were within one-tenth of a second of Johnson's time. The session was suspended when Kenny Wallace's engine blew up since the track then needed to be checked and cleaned, and Wallace changed engines. Jarrett spun out with a brake problem, but since he made only minor contact with the wall, he did not have to switch to a back-up car. After a similar collision, Michael Waltrip also did not have to switch cars.

=== Qualifying results ===
Grid	No.	Driver	Team	Manufacturer	Time	Speed
1	2	Kurt Busch	Penske Racing South	Dodge	19.408	97.568
2	24	Jeff Gordon	Hendrick Motorsports	Chevrolet	19.446	97.377
3	11	Denny Hamlin	Joe Gibbs Racing	Chevrolet	19.484	97.187
4	12	Ryan Newman	Penske Racing South	Dodge	19.489	97.162
5	20	Tony Stewart	Joe Gibbs Racing	Chevrolet	19.514	97.038
6	22	Dave Blaney	Bill Davis Racing	Dodge	19.557	96.825
7	8	Dale Earnhardt Jr.	Dale Earnhardt, Inc.	Chevrolet	19.567	96.775
8	66	Jeff Green	Haas CNC Racing	Chevrolet	19.597	96.627
9	48	Jimmie Johnson	Hendrick Motorsports	Chevrolet	19.631	96.460
10	21	Ken Schrader	Wood Brothers Racing	Ford	19.635	96.440
11	96	Tony Raines	Hall of Fame Racing	Chevrolet	19.646	96.386
12	29	Kevin Harvick	Richard Childress Racing	Chevrolet	19.660	96.317
13	40	David Stremme	Chip Ganassi Racing	Dodge	19.676	96.239
14	45	Kyle Petty	Petty Enterprises	Dodge	19.683	96.205
15	5	Kyle Busch	Hendrick Motorsports	Chevrolet	19.690	96.171
16	41	Reed Sorenson	Chip Ganassi Racing	Chevrolet	19.699	96.128
17	10	Scott Riggs	Evernham Motorsports	Dodge	19.709	96.078^{1}
18	1	Martin Truex Jr.	Dale Earnhardt, Inc.	Chevrolet	19.724	96.005
19	42	Casey Mears	Chip Ganassi Racing	Dodge	19.726	95.995
20	17	Matt Kenseth	Roush Racing	Ford	19.737	95.942
21	25	Brian Vickers	Hendrick Motorsports	Chevrolet	19.740	95.927
22	14	Sterling Marlin	MB2 Motorsport	Chevrolet	19.750	95.879
23	01	Joe Nemechek	Ginn Racing	Chevrolet	19.752	95.869
24	26	Jamie McMurray	Roush Racing	Ford	19.755	95.854
25	6	Mark Martin	Roush Racing	Ford	19.776	95.752
26	7	Robby Gordon	Robby Gordon Motorsports	Chevrolet	19.780	95.733
27	99	Carl Edwards	Roush Racing	Ford	19.791	95.680
28	31	Jeff Burton	Richard Childress Racing	Chevrolet	19.797	95.651
29	38	David Gilliland	Robert Yates Racing	Ford	19,811	95.583
30	43	Bobby Labonte	Petty Enterprises	Dodge	19.818	95.549
31	32	Travis Kvapil	PPI Motorsports	Chevrolet	19.845	95.420
32	9	Kasey Kahne	Evernham Motorsports	Dodge	19.850	95.396
33	55	Michael Waltrip	Waltrip-Jasper Racing	Dodge	19.866	95.319
34	19	Elliott Sadler	Evernham Motorsports	Dodge	19.867	95.314
35	4	Ward Burton	Morgan–McClure Motorsports	Chevrolet	19.869	95.304
36	18	J. J. Yeley	Joe Gibbs Racing	Chevrolet	19.872	95.290
37	07	Clint Bowyer	Richard Childress Racing	Chevrolet	19.894	95.185
38	16	Greg Biffle	Roush Racing	Ford	19.904	95.137
39	88	Dale Jarrett	Robert Yates Racing	Ford	19.908	95.118
40	78	Kenny Wallace	Furniture Row Racing	Chevrolet	19.919	95.065^{1}
41	06	David Ragan	Roush Racing	Ford	19.939	94.970
42	34	Kevin Lepage	Front Row Motorsports	Chevrolet	19.964	94.851
43	72	Mike Skinner	CJM Racing	Chevrolet	19.965	94.846
Failed to qualify
44	49	Mike Bliss	BAM Racing	Dodge	19.993	94.713
45	00	Hermie Sadler	MBA Racing	Chevrolet	20.146	93.994
46	61	Chad Chaffin	Front Row Motorsports	Dodge	20.213	93.682
47	89	Morgan Shepherd	Shepherd Racing Ventures	Dodge	20.217	93.664
48	27	Ted Christopher	Kirk Shelmerdine Racing	Chevrolet	20.231	93.599
49	74	Derrike Cope	McGlynn Racing	Dodge	20.277	93.387
50	30	Stanton Barrett	Rick Ware Racing	Chevrolet	20.551	92.142
^{1} Moved to the back of the field for changing engines

== Race ==
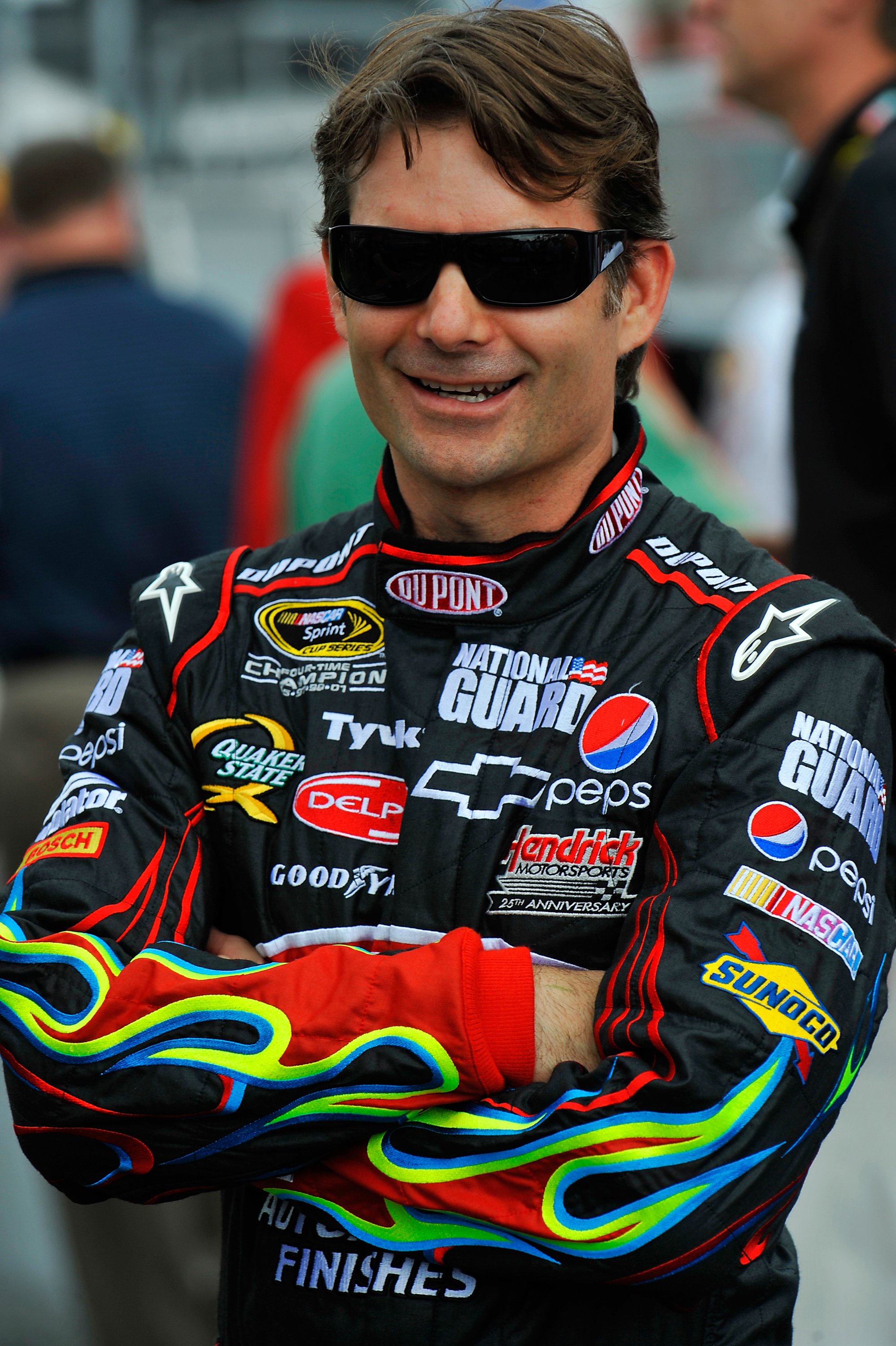
Jeff Gordon (pictured in 2009) took the lead from Kurt Busch at the start and led for a total of 165 laps.

Live television coverage of the race began at 12:32 p.m. EDT in the United States on NBC. Commentary was provided by Bill Weber, Benny Parsons and Wally Dallenbach Jr. Rain showers were forecast for the day of the race, and at the start, weather conditions were overcast, and some rain had already fallen. The air temperature was around 48 °F (9 °C). Cleaning trucks cleared the track before the start. Eldrid Davis of Raceway Ministries began pre-race ceremonies with an invocation, the Martinsville High School marching band performed the national anthem, and Subway spokesperson Jared Fogle commanded the drivers to start their engines. During the pace laps, Riggs and Wallace moved to the rear of the grid because they had changed their engines.

The race began at 1:00 p.m. Gordon accelerated faster than Kurt Busch off the line and was ahead of him by the second turn. The first caution was given three laps later when Kyle Petty spun in turn four, and Martin Truex Jr. made contact with the rear of the slowing Sorenson's car. Jeff Burton had front-end damage to his vehicle when he contacted the rear of Joe Nemechek's car, who hit Marlin. At the lap 11 restart, Gordon maintained his lead over Kurt Busch and Denny Hamlin. Seven laps later, Hamlin passed Kurt Busch for second place. Earnhardt passed Kurt Busch for fourth place on the 44th lap. On lap 45, he reported that one of his engine's cylinders was misfiring and was worse coming out of the turns. Five laps later, Gordon had a 1.8‑second lead over Hamlin, which grew to 2.4 seconds on lap 60; Earnhardt had moved into second on lap 58. On lap 65, a collision between Mears and Newman in turn two prompted the second caution; although Mears was spun around, he was able to continue. During the caution, all the leaders made pit stops for fuel and tires. Jeff Burton's pit crew repaired his loose hood with tape on the right front. Biffle left the track on lap 67 with brake problems. Newman was sent to the rear of the longest line by NASCAR two laps later for his role in the incident with Mears, and Gordon maintained the top position at the lap-73 restart.

Six laps later, Earnhardt passed Raines for second position, and Gordon led Earnhardt by 1 7 seconds by lap 80. Raines was passed by Stewart for third by lap 83, and Johnson took third place from Stewart six laps later. J. J. Yeley drove to pit road on the 94th lap with a flat left-rear tire. On lap 106, Burton (whose car was hot because of the tape on his hood) made contact with Gordon and escaped with minor damage after a three-lap battle. 24 laps later, Johnson passed Earnhardt for second place, and on lap 145, he passed Gordon for the lead. One lap later, Gordon reclaimed first place, and built a quarter-second lead by lap 150. Johnson moved back into the lead on lap 153. Two laps later, Stremme spun sideways in turn four following contact with McMurray, prompting the third caution, and all the leaders made pit stops. Johnson remained the leader at the lap-162 restart, ahead of Gordon and Stewart. After the caution ended, Burton switched to a second ignition after feeling he had a problem with his engine. 42 laps later, Waltrip's turn-four spin prompted the fourth caution; he was able to continue. During the caution, the leaders again made pit stops. Johnson, who had minor air-pressure adjustments because of sunlight exposure at his pit stop, maintained his lead at the lap 210 restart.

Jeff Burton drove to his garage on lap 218 when a carburetor problem caused him to run slower than his rivals; Earnhardt, and Stewart avoided a wreck on that lap. Four laps later, the fifth caution came out when David Gilliland made contact with Ward Burton in turn two; although Burton spun, he avoided hitting the wall. Johnson maintained his lead at the lap-228 restart. The sixth caution was given on lap 231 when Sorenson spun after colliding with Riggs, causing Mike Skinner to strike the left front quarter of Harvick's car and Travis Kvapil to spin sideways. Biffle sustained damage to his car's nose, and turn three was temporarily blocked. Harvick, Kahne, Vickers, and Biffle went to pit road for repairs, while the leaders remained on the track. Johnson led on the lap-239 restart. Four laps later, Kvapil made heavy contact with the wall after being bumped, and Tony Raines' car had a cut tire from contact with Ragan, prompting the seventh caution. Most of the leaders, including Johnson, again made pit stops. On lap 244, it was announced that Jeff Burton had retired from the race. Gordon became the leader at the lap 249 restart, ahead of Hamlin, Elliott Sadler, Kurt Busch, and Nemechek.

Hamlin passed Gordon for the lead on lap 256. Twenty-four laps later, Bowyer made contact with Kenseth, spinning him in turn four (although he kept his car off the wall) and prompting the race's eighth caution. During the caution, most of the leaders (including Hamlin) made pit stops. Kyle and Kurt Busch's pit crews made track-bar adjustments to their cars. Hamlin had tape added to the front of his car to fix a handling problem, and Sadler narrowly avoided a collision with Kahne. Johnson regained the lead after the pit stops, maintaining it at the lap-287 restart. Thirteen laps later, Kurt Busch passed Earnhardt for second place, and Gordon moved back up to fifth by lap 318. On lap 333, the ninth caution was given. Schrader and Ragan made contact into turn one, causing Schrader to hit the outside wall, and both of them hit Jarrett. Schrader retired from the race because of the collision; Ragan and Jarrett continued. The leaders, including Johnson, made pit stops during the caution. Kurt Busch gained the lead after the pit stops, maintaining it at the lap-341 restart. Five laps later, Raines made contact with Skinner, forcing him to collide with the inside wall and prompting the tenth caution. With severe damage to his car's rear end quarter, Skinner stopped after the start-finish line. Kurt Busch maintained his lead at the lap-353 restart, ahead of Johnson and Earnhardt.

Johnson moved into the lead on the same lap after passing Kurt Busch, who dropped two more places over the next two laps. On lap 356, Ragan spun in the second turn after contact with Elliott Sadler, while having Stewart on the inside and Ward Burton on the outside, prompting the 11th caution; none of the leaders made pit stops. Johnson led at the lap-362 restart, ahead of Earnhardt and Hamlin. The 21st caution came out two laps later when Kurt Busch tried to pass Riggs, and the drivers made contact exiting turn four. Kurt Busch was spun while crossing the start-finish line and hit the inside wall, requiring a pit stop for repairs. Johnson maintained his lead at the lap-372 restart and was followed by Earnhardt, Hamlin, Kurt Busch, and Gordon (who made a pit stop for an air-pressure adjustment during the caution). Hamlin passed Earnhardt for second place eight laps later, and held off the latter on lap 381. The 13th caution was prompted on lap 400 when Bobby Labonte made contact with the rear of Jamie McMurray's car in turn two, sending him spinning sideways but avoiding the wall. Most of the leaders, including Johnson, made pit stops. Johnson adjusted his air pressure, and Hamlin's pit crew removed a front fender.

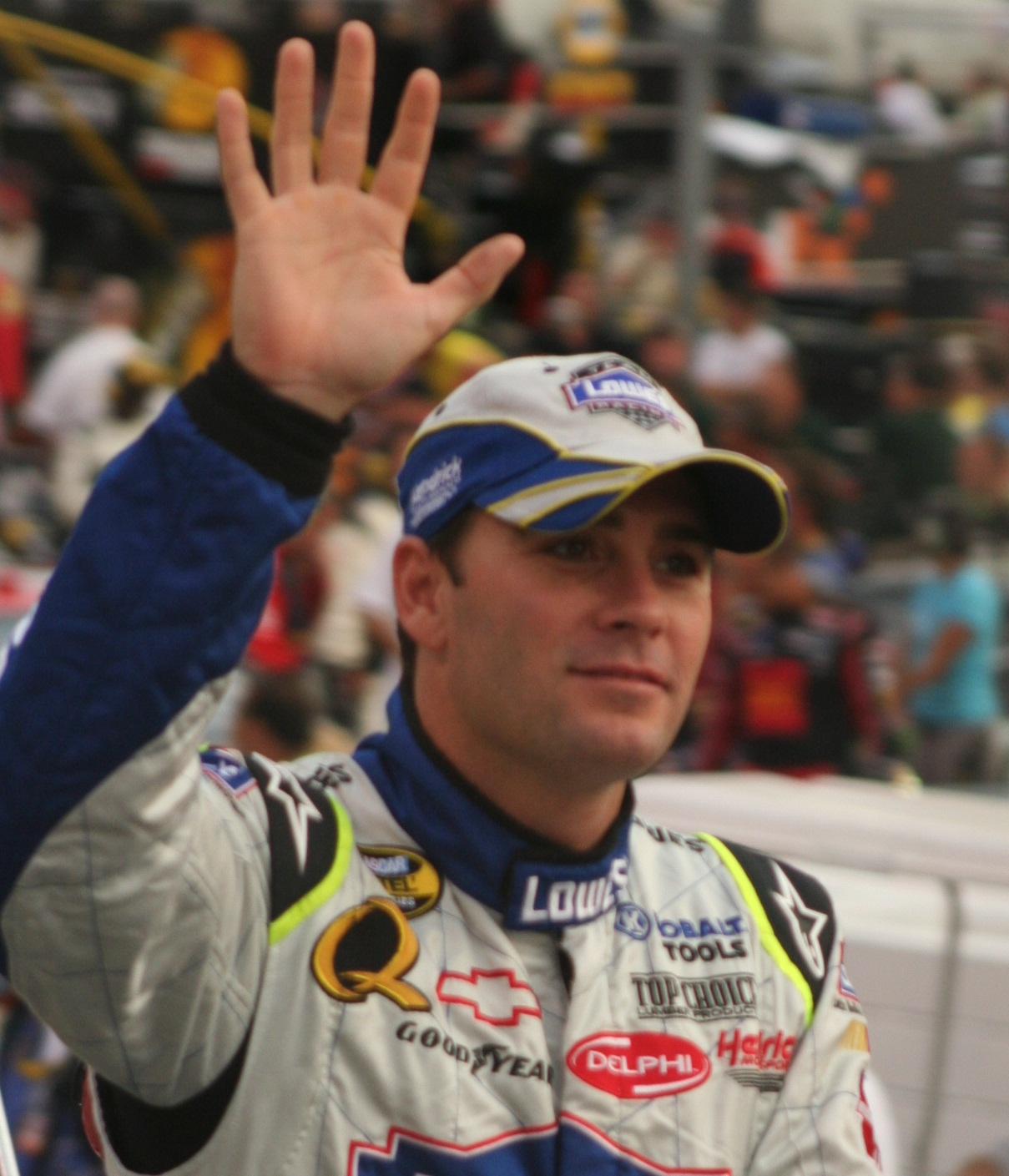
Jimmie Johnson (pictured in 2007) won the race after overtaking Bobby Labonte with fifty-five laps remaining.

Labonte led on the lap-407 restart, followed by Mears and Gordon. Elliott Sadler went to his garage with motor problems on lap 411. By lap 438, Johnson had moved into second position. Seven laps later, he passed Labonte, for the lead, and Hamlin passed Gordon for fourth a lap later. Lap 448 saw the 14th caution; Ragan spun sideways at on the inside at turn four, and Kyle Busch collided with the outside wall to avoid him, sustaining minor damage to his car's right side. On that lap, Kyle Busch entered pit road for repairs. The race restarted on lap 454, with Johnson leading Labonte and Hamlin. On the 460th lap, Gilliand caused Mears to spin sideways coming out of turn four, prompting the 15th caution; Johnson maintained his lead at the restart on lap 468. On lap 469, Bowyer triggered the 16th caution after spinning sideways at turn three. Four laps later, Martin drove to pit road for engine troubleshooting.

The race restarted on lap 477, when a seventeenth caution was issued because Earnhardt made contact with Kahne after trying to pass him on the inside at turn three and spun. Martin again went to pit road because of water problems, and Johnson maintained the lead at the restart on lap 483. On lap 485, Hamlin passed Labonte for second place. Five laps later, Wallace spun coming out of turn two after being hit by McMurray, prompting the race's final caution; he was able to continue. Johnson remained the leader at the lap-495 restart, with Hamlin close behind. Hamlin bumped Johnson coming out of turn two, causing Johnson to move to the outside lane, and went to the inside lane to draw alongside him on the backstretch. They remained side by side for one lap when Johnson drew ahead of Hamlin at turn four. He pulled away, holding the lead for the remaining six laps to win the race. Hamlin finished second, ahead of Labonte in third, Stewart in fourth and Gordon in fifth. Mears, Kahne, Green, Harvick, and Petty rounded out the top ten finishers. The race had a total of 18 cautions and 16 lead changes by five drivers. Johnson led seven times for a total of 245 laps, more than any other competitor. The win was the 23rd of Johnson's Cup Career and the last of five victories he posted in the 2006 season.

=== Post-race comments ===
Johnson appeared in Victory Lane after his victory lap to celebrate his fifth win of the season in front of the crowd; the win earned him $191,886. He was pleased with the result, saying he was happy to have taken the victory: "We've been running up front the last three of four races and haven't been able to close the deal. Today we did." Hamlin was disappointed with his finish as he felt he had a faster car after the race's final restart and admitted Johnson would not be beaten: "It was my only shot to get around him. I wasn't going to get under him completely. There was no way possible. I was doing the best I could to win the race." He later admitted he made contact with Johnson and that it was on purpose. Labonte said about his third-place finish, "I feel like I stole something." Jeff Burton was philosophical about his retirement from the race: "These things happen. Everybody has had an issue in this Chase, and we had ours today. This thing is not over for us by any means." Kenseth, who finished eleventh, was optimistic about his chances of winning the Drivers' Championship: "It's great to be the leader, but we've got to start running good, It's still pretty wide open. It's going to be pretty exciting, I think, coming down to the last race."

Earnhardt admitted he was to blame for the collision with Kahne on lap 476. He said he was anxious to pass him and was underneath him when he made the maneuver, but his rear brakes locked, which caused him to spin. Kahne thought Earnhardt was driving too hard in turn three: "I guess I need to get somebody on [the radio] to preach to me to have more patience because I definitely can't take control of myself." After retiring from the race, Schrader said of his collision with Ragan, "I moved him earlier because you can't run like that two laps down. Got back around him and he paid me back for moving him, but he was two laps down." Ragan denied intentionally wrecking Schrader, saying he over-drove his car going into the first corner and his brakes locked. Stewart saw Ragan's lap-447 spin (which caused Kyle Busch to collide with the wall) and believed NASCAR should have disqualified Ragan from the race.

According to Mears, who was involved in an incident with Newman on the 64th lap, "[Newman] was kind of holding everyone up. When I got up to him, he tried to park me in the center of the corner. [He] just got on the brakes and I got into the back of him. Got him a little loose. He didn't wreck, but he came around the next lap and wrecked me." Although Mears was also angry about the incident with Gilliland 396 laps later, he praised his car's handling and said it was the first time a car had worked in his favor. Three days after the race, NASCAR announced that Waltrip-Jasper Racing crew chief Tommy Baldwin Jr. was fined $5,000 for violating four NASCAR rules. The fines were for "actions detrimental to stock car racing" car, car parts, components and/or equipment used in the race that was not compliant to NASCAR rules, and entering the car-servicing area without a fire-resistant uniform or helmet.

The result left Kenseth leading the Drivers' Championship with 5,848 points, ahead of Harvick with 5,812. Johnson moved into third with 5,807, six points ahead of Hamlin. After the race, Jeff Burton, who fell to fifth, was still upbeat about his championship chances: "We have as good a shot as anybody. We've run well enough to win the championship; we just got to put the next four races together." Earnhardt, Martin, Kahne, Gordon, and Kyle Busch rounded out the top ten. In the Manufacturers' Championship, Chevrolet maintained the lead with 246 points. Dodge remained in second with 185, eight points ahead of Ford. The race took 3 hours and 44 minutes to complete, and the margin of victory was 0.544 seconds.

=== Race results ===
Pos	No.	Driver	Team	Manufacturer	Laps run	Points
1	48	Jimmie Johnson	Hendrick Motorsports	Chevrolet	500	190^{2}
2	11	Denny Hamlin	Joe Gibbs Racing	Chevrolet	500	175^{1}
3	43	Bobby Labonte	Petty Enterprises	Dodge	500	170^{1}
4	20	Tony Stewart	Joe Gibbs Racing	Chevrolet	500	160
5	24	Jeff Gordon	Hendrick Motorsports	Chevrolet	500	160^{1}
6	42	Casey Mears	Chip Ganassi Racing	Dodge	500	150
7	9	Kasey Kahne	Evernham Motorsports	Dodge	500	146
8	66	Jeff Green	Haas CNC Racing	Chevrolet	500	142
9	29	Kevin Harvick	Richard Childress Racing	Chevrolet	500	138
10	45	Kyle Petty	Petty Enterprises	Dodge	500	134
11	17	Matt Kenseth	Roush Racing	Ford	500	130
12	99	Carl Edwards	Roush Racing	Ford	500	127
13	12	Ryan Newman	Penske Racing South	Dodge	500	124
14	96	Tony Raines	Hall of Fame Racing	Chevrolet	500	121
15	40	David Stremme	Chip Ganassi Racing	Dodge	500	118
16	88	Dale Jarrett	Robert Yates Racing	Ford	500	115
17	25	Brian Vickers	Hendrick Motorsports	Chevrolet	500	112
18	5	Kyle Busch	Hendrick Motorsports	Chevrolet	500	109
19	26	Jamie McMurray	Roush Racing	Ford	500	106
20	01	Joe Nemechek	Ginn Racing	Chevrolet	500	103
21	14	Sterling Marlin	MB2 Motorsport	Chevrolet	500	100
22	8	Dale Earnhardt Jr.	Dale Earnhardt, Inc.	Chevrolet	500	97
23	07	Clint Bowyer	Richard Childress Racing	Chevrolet	500	94
24	6	Mark Martin	Roush Racing	Ford	500	91
25	06	David Ragan	Roush Racing	Ford	500	88
26	4	Ward Burton	Morgan-McClure Motorsports	Chevrolet	500	85
27	2	Kurt Busch	Penske Racing South	Dodge	496	87^{1}
28	38	David Gilliland	Robert Yates Racing	Ford	496	79
29	78	Kenny Wallace	Furniture Row Racing	Chevrolet	496	76
30	10	Scott Riggs	Evernham Motorsports	Dodge	495	73
31	18	J. J. Yeley	Joe Gibbs Racing	Chevrolet	494	70
32	16	Greg Biffle	Roush Racing	Ford	486	67
33	22	Dave Blaney	Bill Davis Racing	Dodge	485	64
34	55	Michael Waltrip	Michael Waltrip Racing	Dodge	472	61
35	41	Reed Sorenson	Chip Ganassi Racing	Dodge	460	58
36	1	Martin Truex Jr.	Dale Earnhardt, Inc.	Chevrolet	453	55
37	7	Robby Gordon	Robby Gordon Motorsports	Chevrolet	416	52
38	19	Elliott Sadler	Evernham Motorsports	Dodge	412	49
39	72	Mike Skinner	CJM Racing	Chevrolet	341	46
40	32	Travis Kvapil	PPI Motorsports	Chevrolet	332	43
41	21	Ken Schrader	Wood Brothers Racing	Ford	331	40
42	31	Jeff Burton	Richard Childress Racing	Chevrolet	217	37
43	34	Kevin Lepage	Front Row Motorsports	Chevrolet	209	34
^{1} Includes five bonus points for leading a lap^{2} Includes ten bonus points for leading the most laps

== Standings after the race ==
Drivers' Championship standings
Pos	+/−	Driver	Points
1	1	Matt Kenseth	5,848
2	1	Kevin Harvick	5,812 (−36)
3	4	Jimmie Johnson	5,807 (−41)
4	2	Denny Hamlin	5,801 (−47)
5	4	Jeff Burton	5,800 (−48)
6	1	Dale Earnhardt Jr.	5,754 (−94)
7	3	Mark Martin	5,752 (−96)
8		Kasey Kahne	5,749 (−99)
9	1	Jeff Gordon	5,707 (−141)
10	1	Kyle Busch	5,677 (−171)

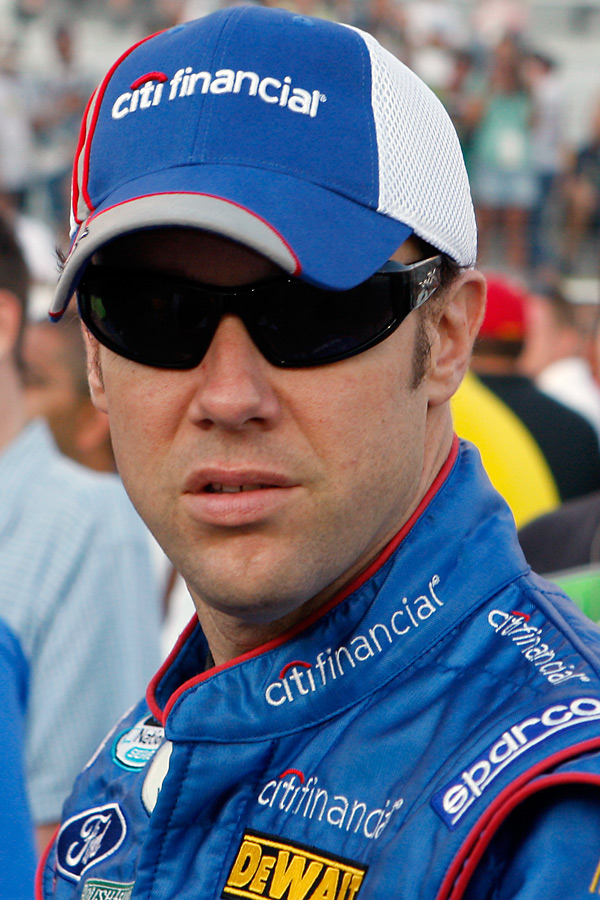
Matt Kenseth (pictured in 2009) became the new points leader with 5,848, after finishing eleventh.

Manufacturers' Championship standings
Pos	+/−	Manufacturer	Points
1		Chevrolet	246
2		Dodge	185 (−61)
3		Ford	177 (−69)

- Note: Only the top ten positions are included for the driver standings. These drivers qualified for the Chase for the Nextel Cup.

Previous race: 2006 Bank of America 500	Nextel Cup Series; 2006 season	Next race: 2006 Bass Pro Shops MBNA 500
