= List of NASCAR race wins by Jimmie Johnson =

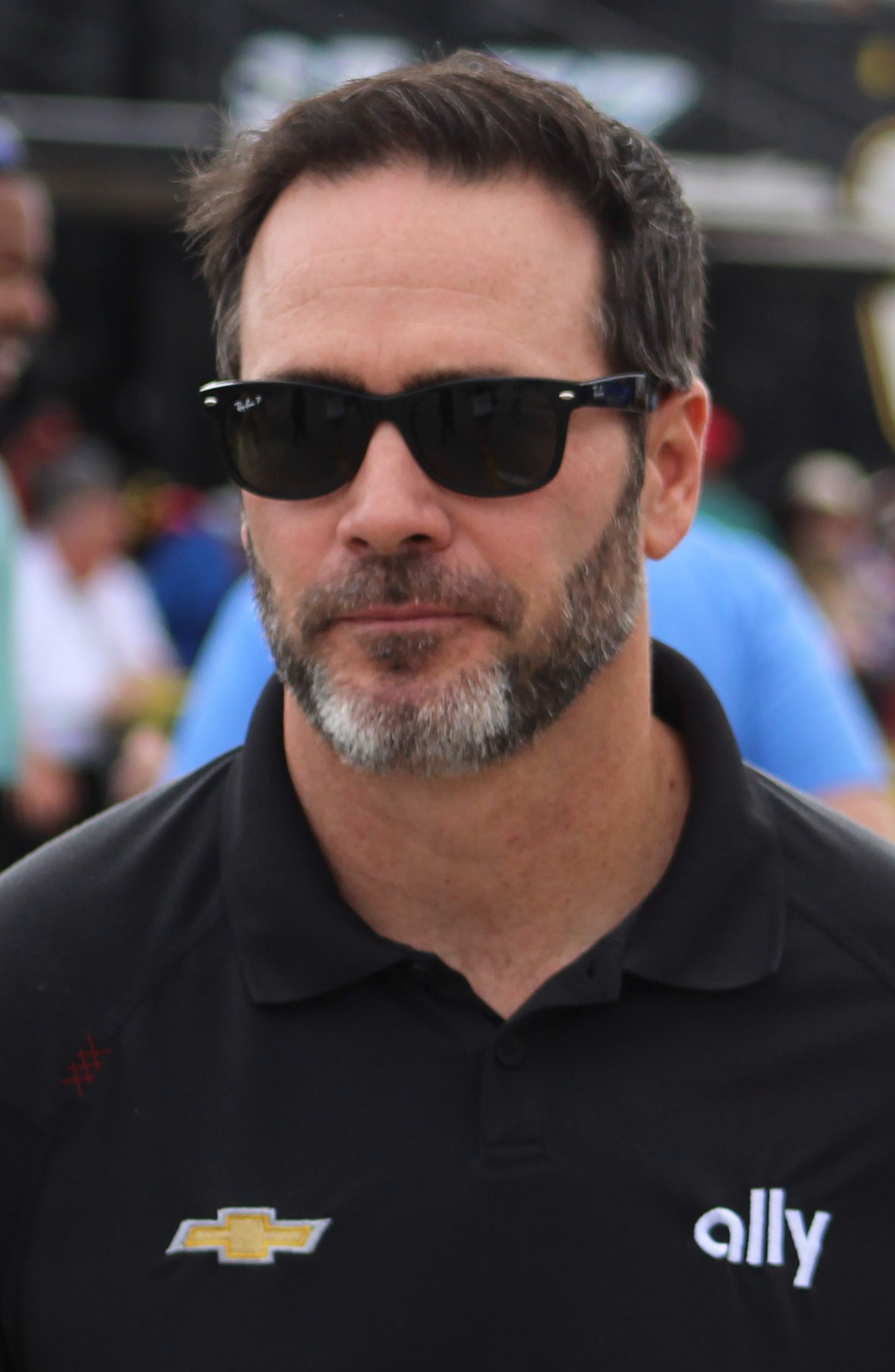
Jimmie Johnson won 83 NASCAR-sanctioned races and seven Cup Series championships.

Jimmie Johnson is an American race car driver who has won seven Drivers' Championships in the NASCAR Cup Series. He entered NASCAR part-time in the Busch Series in 1998 with the ST Motorsports and later Curb Agajanian Performance Group teams. Johnson drove eight races for Herzog Motorsports in the 1999 Busch Series, and spent two full seasons with the team in 2000 and 2001 before moving to Hendrick Motorsports in the 2001 Winston Cup Series. He was runner-up to Matt Kenseth in 2003 and Kurt Busch in 2004, before winning five successive Cup Series championships from 2006 to 2010, breaking Cale Yarborough's record of three consecutive titles from 1976 to 1978. Johnson claimed a further two titles in 2013 and 2016 to tie Dale Earnhardt and Richard Petty with seven career Cup Series championships.

He achieved his first NASCAR victory at the 2001 Sam's Club Presents the Hills Brothers Coffee 300 Busch Series round at Chicagoland Speedway on July 14. Johnson took his maiden Cup Series win at the 2002 NAPA Auto Parts 500 at California Speedway in a season in which he registered three victories. He won 18 races in his first four full seasons with Hendrick Motorsports, including a season-high eight in 2004. Johnson took his first Cup Series championship in 2006 with five wins. He enjoyed his most successful season in terms of race victories with ten in 2007. In Johnson's following three seasons with Hendrick Motorsports, he won no less than six races. He managed only two wins in 2011 and five in 2012. Johnson won six more times as he took his sixth championship in 2013. This was followed by four wins in 2014, five each in 2015 and his seventh championship victory in 2016 and three in 2017. Johnson's most recent victory in NASCAR came at the 13th round of the 2017 season at the 2017 AAA 400 Drive for Autism at Dover International Speedway.

Over the course of his racing career, he won a total of 84 NASCAR races, 83 of which were in the Cup Series. Johnson also won one race in the NASCAR Busch Series. He also won the Daytona 500 twice in 2006 and 2013. As of 2020, Johnson ranks sixth on the all-time Cup wins list with 83, tied with Yarborough. He is most successful at Dover International Speedway, where he claimed eleven victories, including a season sweep of wins at the track in 2002 and 2009. Johnson's largest margin of victory in his career was at the 2008 Subway Fresh Fit 500 at Phoenix International Raceway, a race where he finished 7.002 seconds ahead of the second-placed Clint Bowyer of the Richard Childress Racing team, while the narrowest was in the 2011 Aaron's 499 at Talladega Superspeedway, where he beat Bowyer by 0.002 seconds, one of the closest finishes in NASCAR.

== NASCAR ==
=== Cup Series ===
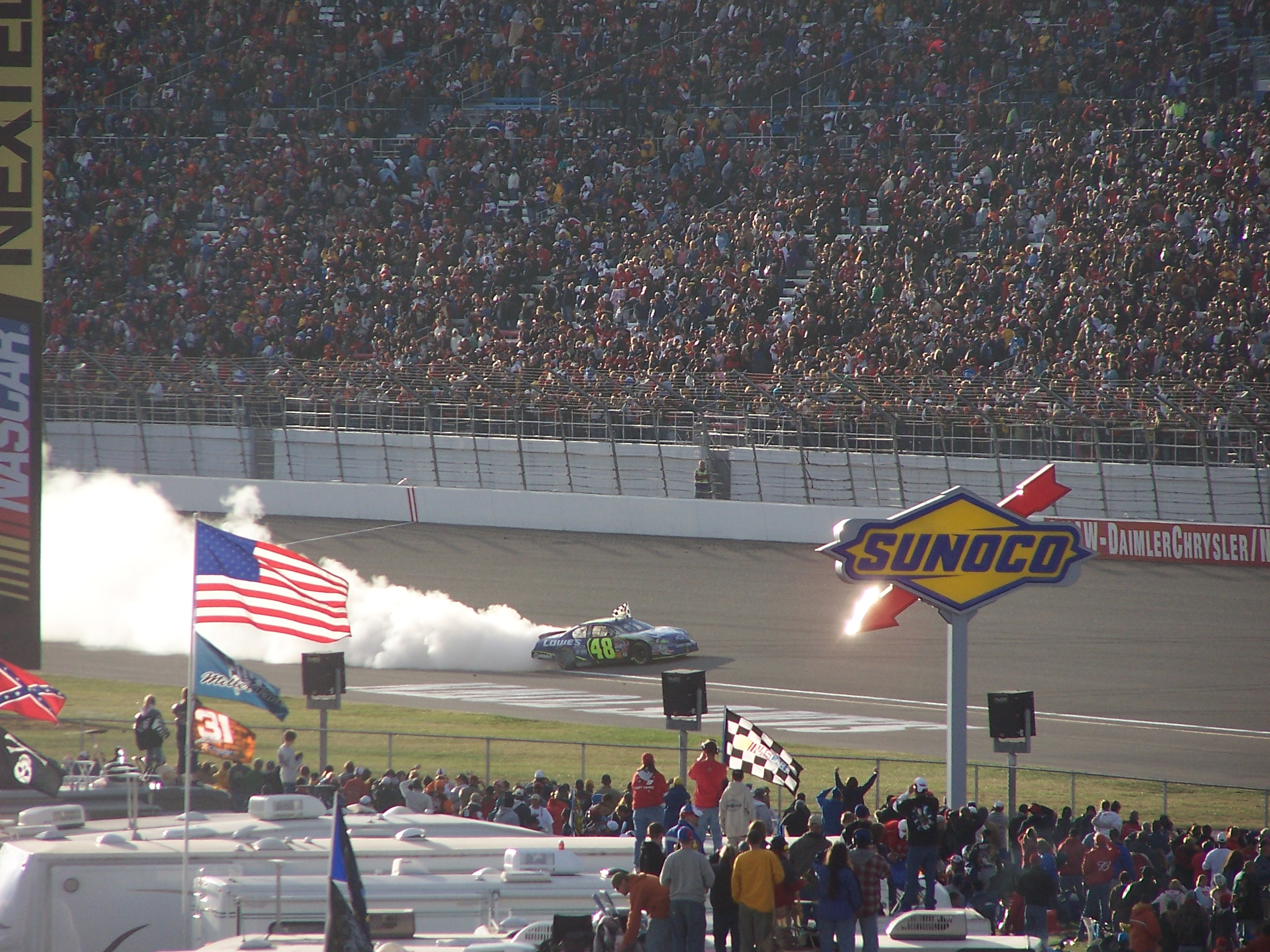
Johnson performing a burnout at the 2006 UAW-DaimlerChrysler 400

In the NASCAR Cup Series, which was sponsored by Winston, Nextel, Sprint, and Monster Energy during Johnson's career, Johnson, the seven-time Cup Series champion for Hendrick Motorsports has won 83 races. Throughout his career, he has won at 20 of the 26 tracks at which he raced on, leaving the Charlotte Roval, Daytona Road Course, Chicagoland Speedway, Kentucky Speedway, Rockingham Speedway and Watkins Glen International the six tracks where he has failed to win. As of the end of the 2023 NASCAR Cup Series, Johnson's 83 wins rank sixth all-time tied with Cale Yarborough, behind Richard Petty (200), David Pearson (105), Jeff Gordon (93), Bobby Allison (84) and Darrell Waltrip (84).

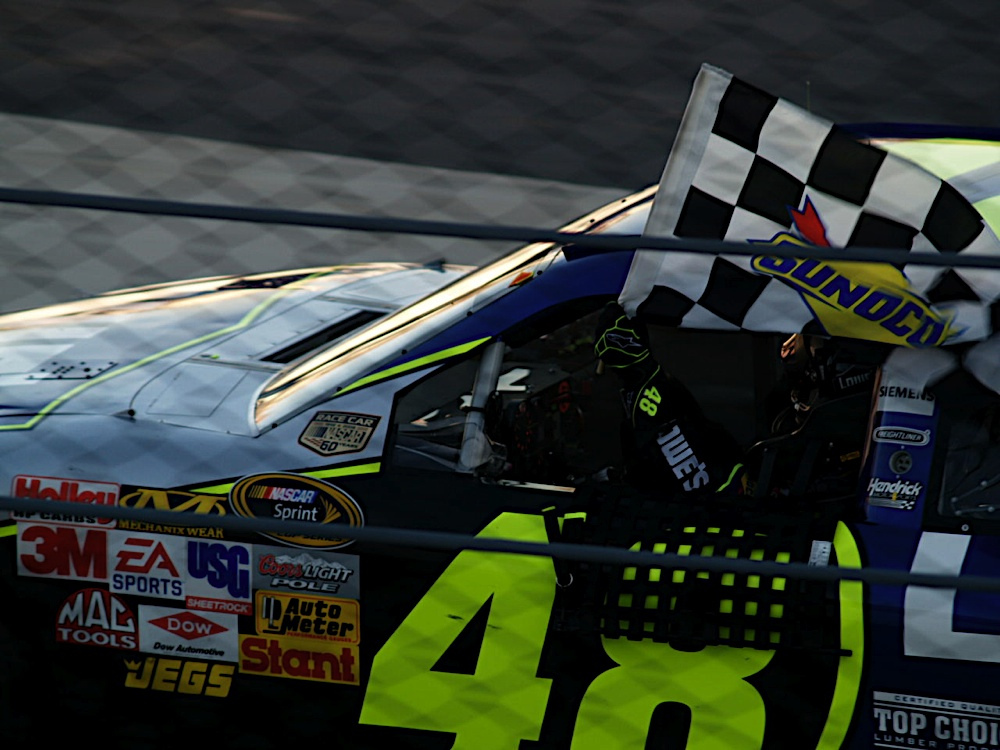
Johnson holding the checkered flag at the 2008 Tums QuikPak 500

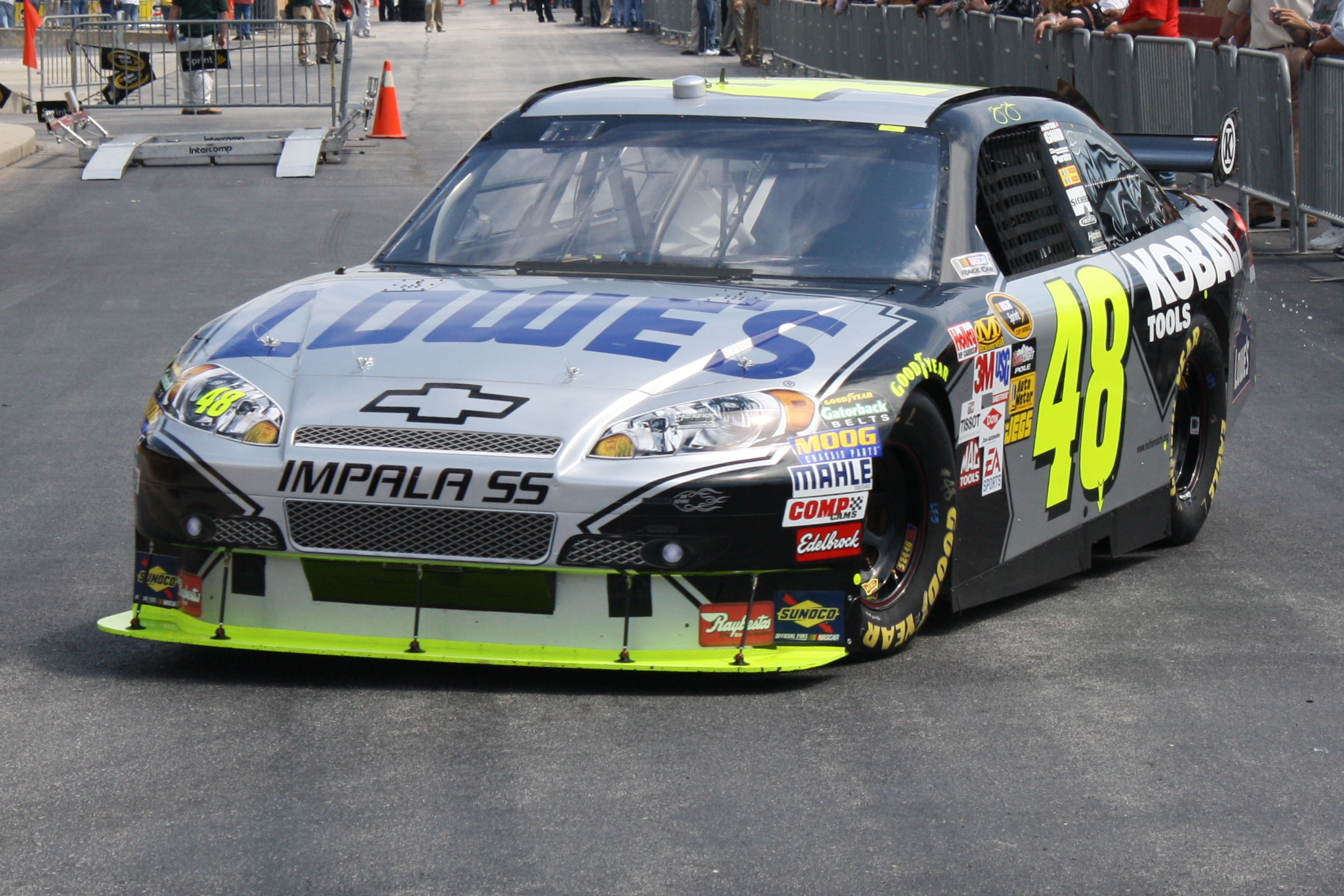
Johnson's car parked in practice for the 2009 Shelby 427.

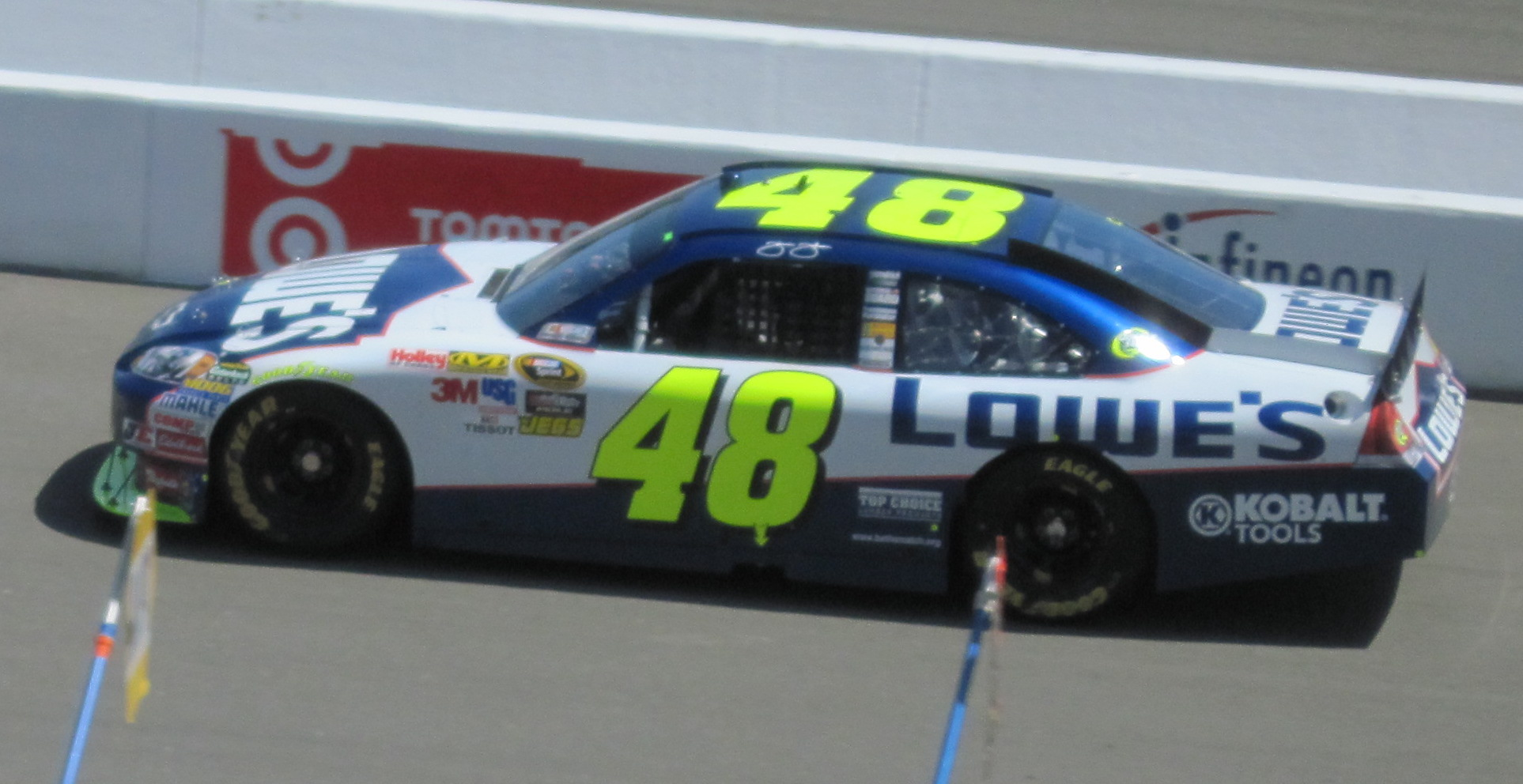
Johnson took the only road course win of his career at the 2010 Toyota/Save Mart 350.

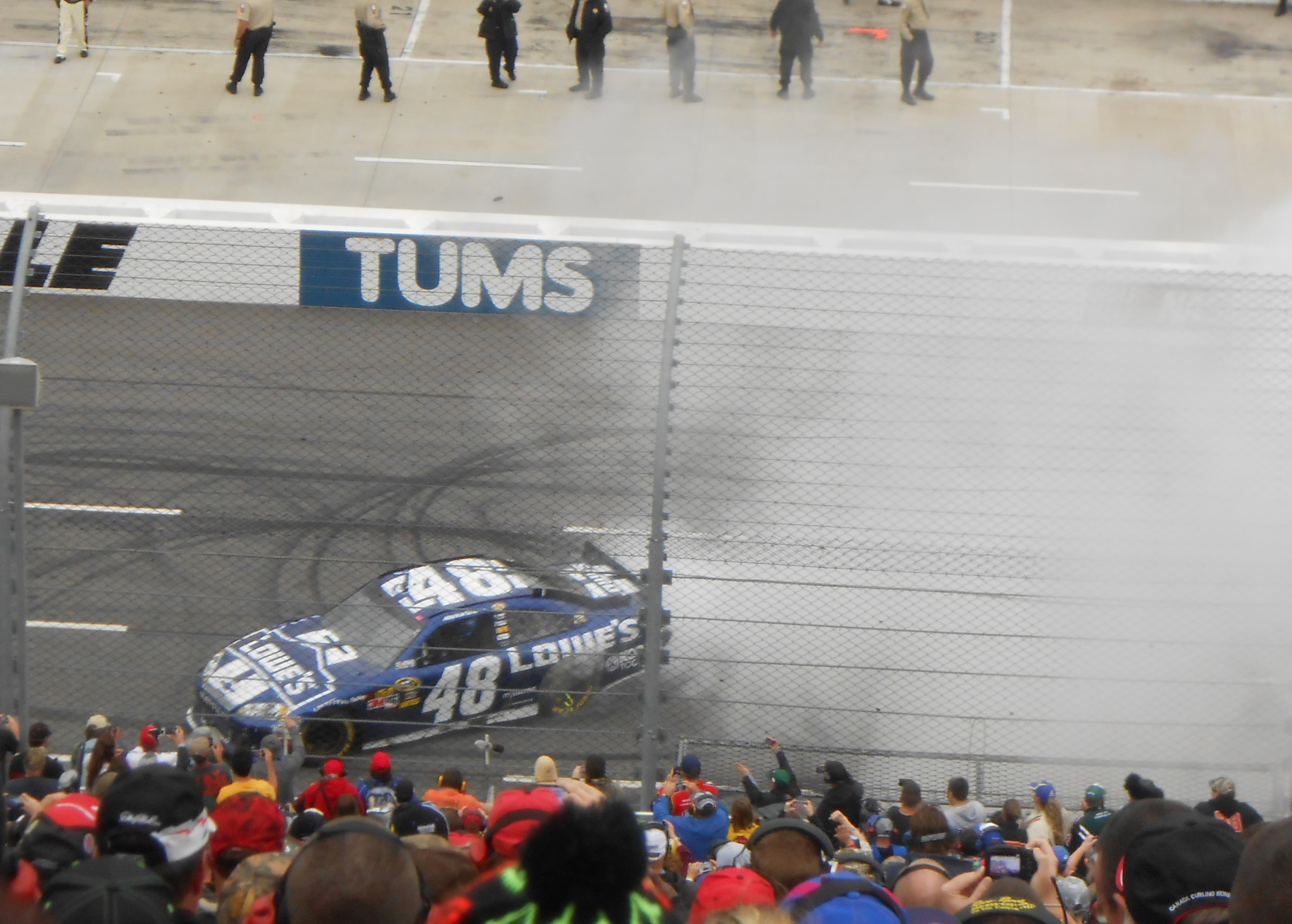
Johnson performing a burnout at the 2012 Tums Fast Relief 500

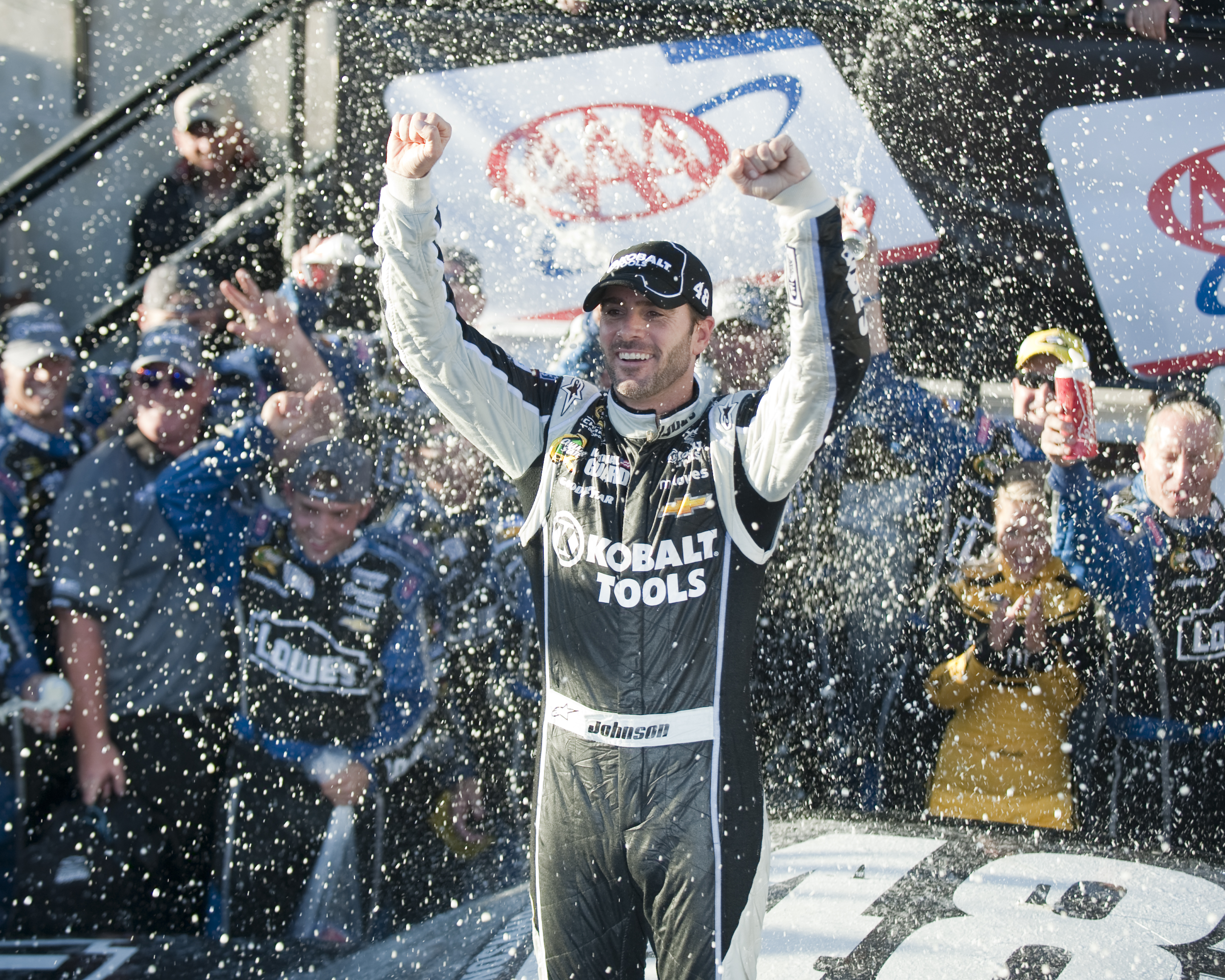
Johnson celebrating winning the 2013 AAA 400.

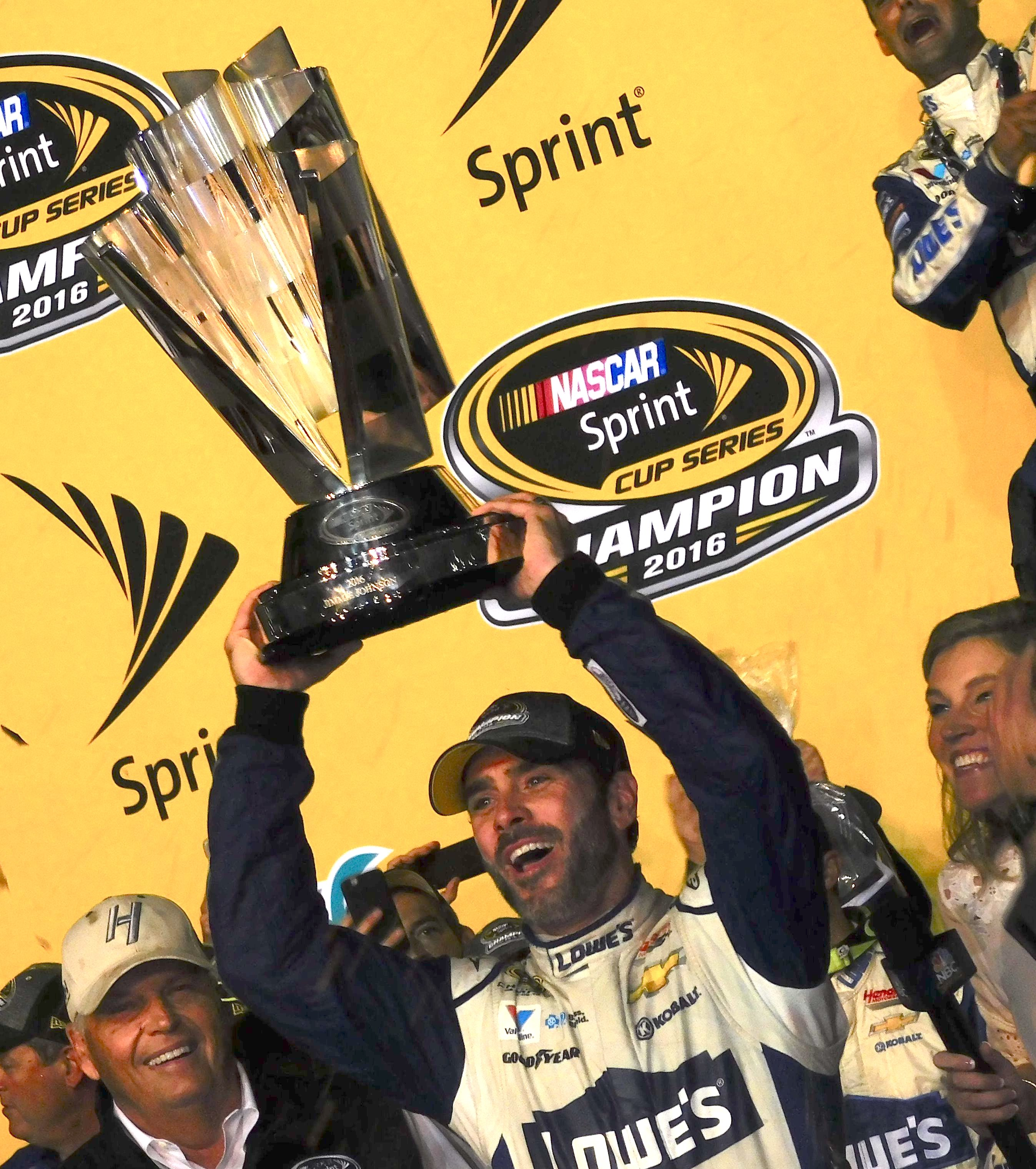
Johnson holding the Sprint Cup trophy after clinching his seventh Cup Series title with a win in the 2016 Ford EcoBoost 400

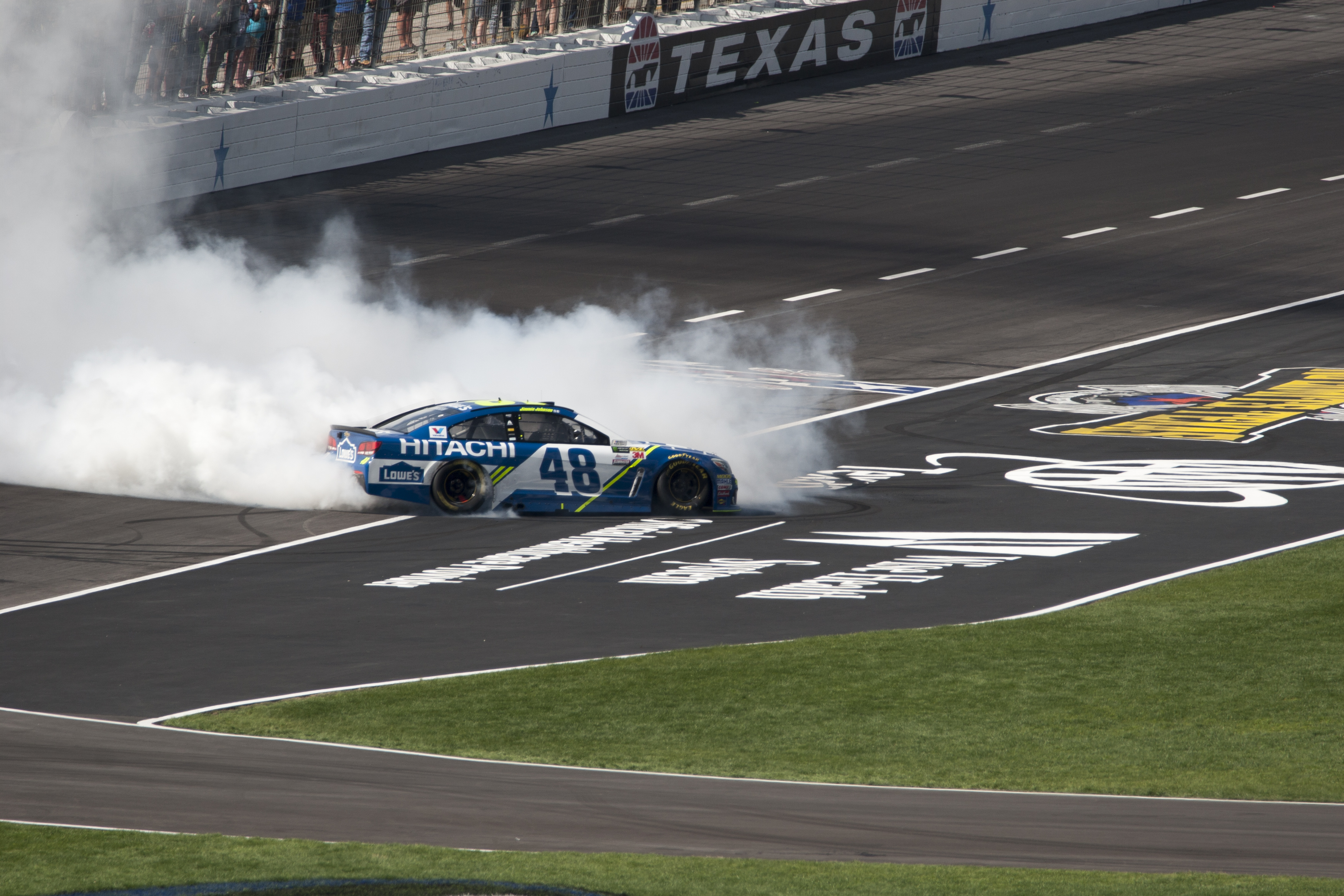
Johnson performing a burnout at the 2017 O'Reilly Auto Parts 500

Key:

- No. – Victory number; for example, "1" signifies Johnson's first race win.
- Grid – The position on the grid from which Johnson started the race.
- Margin – Margin of victory, given in the format of seconds.milliseconds; caution indicates the race was ended by a yellow flag for an accident or inclement weather
- † – Driver's Championship winning season.

NASCAR Cup Series victories
No.	Date	Season	Race	Track	Grid	Margin	Team	Car	Ref
1	April 28, 2002	2002	NAPA Auto Parts 500	California Speedway	4	0.620	Hendrick Motorsports	Chevrolet	
2	June 2, 2002	2002	MBNA Platinum 400	Dover International Speedway	10	0.478	Hendrick Motorsports	Chevrolet	
3	September 22, 2002	2002	MBNA All-American Heroes 400	Dover International Speedway	19	0.535	Hendrick Motorsports	Chevrolet	
4	May 25, 2003	2003	Coca-Cola 600	Lowe's Motor Speedway	37 (Note: Johnson began the race from the back of the field because he changed his engine after qualifying.)	Caution	Hendrick Motorsports	Chevrolet	
5	July 20, 2003	2003	New England 300	New Hampshire International Speedway	6	1.582	Hendrick Motorsports	Chevrolet	
6	September 14, 2003	2003	Sylvania 300	New Hampshire International Speedway	8	6.240	Hendrick Motorsports	Chevrolet	
7	March 21, 2004	2004	Carolina Dodge Dealers 400	Darlington Raceway	11	0.132	Hendrick Motorsports	Chevrolet	
8	May 30, 2004	2004	Coca-Cola 600	Lowe's Motor Speedway	1	Caution	Hendrick Motorsports	Chevrolet	
9	June 13, 2004	2004	Pocono 500	Pocono Raceway	5	Caution	Hendrick Motorsports	Chevrolet	
10	August 1, 2004	2004	Pennsylvania 500	Pocono Raceway	14	2.138	Hendrick Motorsports	Chevrolet	
11	October 16, 2004	2004	UAW-GM Quality 500	Lowe's Motor Speedway	9	1.727	Hendrick Motorsports	Chevrolet	
12	October 24, 2004	2004	Subway 500	Martinsville Speedway	18	1.225	Hendrick Motorsports	Chevrolet	
13	October 31, 2004	2004	Bass Pro Shops MBNA 500	Atlanta Motor Speedway	8	0.293	Hendrick Motorsports	Chevrolet	
14	November 14, 2004	2004	Mountain Dew Southern 500	Darlington Raceway	4	0.959	Hendrick Motorsports	Chevrolet	
15	March 13, 2005	2005	UAW-DaimlerChrysler 400	Las Vegas Motor Speedway	9	1.661	Hendrick Motorsports	Chevrolet	
16	May 29, 2005	2005	Coca-Cola 600	Lowe's Motor Speedway	5	0.027	Hendrick Motorsports	Chevrolet	
17	September 25, 2005	2005	MBNA NASCAR RacePoints 400	Dover International Speedway	5	0.080	Hendrick Motorsports	Chevrolet	
18	October 15, 2005	2005	UAW-GM Quality 500	Lowe's Motor Speedway	3	0.309	Hendrick Motorsports	Chevrolet	
19	February 19, 2006	2006†	Daytona 500	Daytona International Speedway	9	Caution	Hendrick Motorsports	Chevrolet	
20	March 12, 2006	2006†	UAW-DaimlerChrysler 400	Las Vegas Motor Speedway	3	0.045	Hendrick Motorsports	Chevrolet	
21	May 1, 2006	2006†	Aaron's 499	Talladega Superspeedway	16	0.120	Hendrick Motorsports	Chevrolet	
22	August 6, 2006	2006†	Brickyard 400	Indianapolis Motor Speedway	5	Caution	Hendrick Motorsports	Chevrolet	
23	October 22, 2006	2006†	Subway 500	Martinsville Speedway	9	0.544	Hendrick Motorsports	Chevrolet	
24	March 11, 2007	2007†	UAW-DaimlerChrysler 400	Las Vegas Motor Speedway	23	2.795	Hendrick Motorsports	Chevrolet	
25	March 18, 2007	2007†	Kobalt Tools 500	Atlanta Motor Speedway	3	1.311	Hendrick Motorsports	Chevrolet	
26	April 1, 2007	2007†	Goody's Cool Orange 500	Martinsville Speedway	20	0.065	Hendrick Motorsports	Chevrolet	
27	May 6, 2007	2007†	Crown Royal Presents The Jim Stewart 400	Richmond International Raceway	4	0.723	Hendrick Motorsports	Chevrolet	
28	September 2, 2007	2007†	Sharp AQUOS 500	California Speedway	2	1.868	Hendrick Motorsports	Chevrolet	
29	September 8, 2007	2007†	Chevy Rock & Roll 400	Richmond International Raceway	1	3.007	Hendrick Motorsports	Chevrolet	
30	October 21, 2007	2007†	Subway 500	Martinsville Speedway	4	Caution	Hendrick Motorsports	Chevrolet	
31	October 28, 2007	2007†	Pep Boys Auto 500	Atlanta Motor Speedway	6	Caution	Hendrick Motorsports	Chevrolet	
32	November 4, 2007	2007†	Dickies 500	Texas Motor Speedway	8	0.944	Hendrick Motorsports	Chevrolet	
33	November 11, 2007	2007†	Checker Auto Parts 500	Phoenix International Raceway	6	0.870	Hendrick Motorsports	Chevrolet	
34	April 12, 2008	2008†	Subway Fresh Fit 500	Phoenix International Raceway	7	7.002	Hendrick Motorsports	Chevrolet	
35	July 27, 2008	2008†	Brickyard 400	Indianapolis Motor Speedway	1	0.332	Hendrick Motorsports	Chevrolet	
36	August 31, 2008	2008†	Pepsi 500	Auto Club Speedway	1	2.076	Hendrick Motorsports	Chevrolet	
37	September 7, 2008	2008†	Chevy Rock & Roll 400	Richmond International Raceway	3	0.365	Hendrick Motorsports	Chevrolet	
38	September 28, 2008	2008†	Camping World RV 400	Kansas Speedway	1	0.280	Hendrick Motorsports	Chevrolet	
39	October 19, 2008	2008†	Tums QuikPak 500	Martinsville Speedway	1	0.708	Hendrick Motorsports	Chevrolet	
40	November 9, 2008	2008†	Checker O'Reilly Auto Parts 500	Phoenix International Raceway	1	0.295	Hendrick Motorsports	Chevrolet	
41	March 29, 2009	2009†	Goody's Fast Pain Relief 500	Martinsville Speedway	9	0.774	Hendrick Motorsports	Chevrolet	
42	May 31, 2009	2009†	Autism Speaks 400	Dover International Speedway	8	0.861	Hendrick Motorsports	Chevrolet	
43	July 26, 2009	2009†	Brickyard 400	Indianapolis Motor Speedway	16	0.400	Hendrick Motorsports	Chevrolet	
44	September 27, 2009	2009†	AAA 400	Dover International Speedway	1	1.970	Hendrick Motorsports	Chevrolet	
45	October 11, 2009	2009†	Pepsi 500	Auto Club Speedway	3	1.603	Hendrick Motorsports	Chevrolet	
46	October 17, 2009	2009†	NASCAR Banking 500	Lowe's Motor Speedway	1	2.303	Hendrick Motorsports	Chevrolet	
47	November 15, 2009	2009†	Checker O'Reilly Auto Parts 500	Phoenix International Raceway	3	1.033	Hendrick Motorsports	Chevrolet	
48	February 21, 2010	2010†	Auto Club 500	Auto Club Speedway	7	1.523	Hendrick Motorsports	Chevrolet	
49	February 28, 2010	2010†	Shelby American	Las Vegas Motor Speedway	20	1.874	Hendrick Motorsports	Chevrolet	
50	March 21, 2010	2010†	Food City 500	Bristol Motor Speedway	4	0.894	Hendrick Motorsports	Chevrolet	
51	June 20, 2010	2010†	Toyota/Save Mart 350	Infineon Raceway	2	3.105	Hendrick Motorsports	Chevrolet	
52	June 27, 2010	2010†	Lenox Industrial Tools 301	New Hampshire Motor Speedway	10	0.753	Hendrick Motorsports	Chevrolet	
53	September 26, 2010	2010†	AAA 400	Dover International Speedway	1	2.637	Hendrick Motorsports	Chevrolet	
54	April 17, 2011	2011	Aaron's 499	Talladega Superspeedway	2	0.002	Hendrick Motorsports	Chevrolet	
55	October 9, 2011	2011	Hollywood Casino 400	Kansas Speedway	19	0.548	Hendrick Motorsports	Chevrolet	
56	May 12, 2012	2012	Bojangles' Southern 500	Darlington Raceway	2	0.781	Hendrick Motorsports	Chevrolet	
57	June 3, 2012	2012	FedEx 400	Dover International Speedway	2	2.550	Hendrick Motorsports	Chevrolet	
58	July 29, 2012	2012	Crown Royal Presents the Curtiss Shaver 400	Indianapolis Motor Speedway	6	4.758	Hendrick Motorsports	Chevrolet	
59	October 28, 2012	2012	Tums Fast Relief 500	Martinsville Speedway	1	0.478	Hendrick Motorsports	Chevrolet	
60	November 4, 2012	2012	AAA Texas 500	Texas Motor Speedway	1	0.808	Hendrick Motorsports	Chevrolet	
61	February 24, 2013	2013†	Daytona 500	Daytona International Speedway	9	0.129	Hendrick Motorsports	Chevrolet	
62	April 7, 2013	2013†	STP Gas Booster 500	Martinsville Speedway	1	0.627	Hendrick Motorsports	Chevrolet	
63	June 9, 2013	2013†	Party in the Poconos 400	Pocono Raceway	1	1.208	Hendrick Motorsports	Chevrolet	
64	July 6, 2013	2013†	Coke Zero 400	Daytona International Speedway	8	0.107	Hendrick Motorsports	Chevrolet	
65	September 29, 2013	2013†	AAA 400	Dover International Speedway	8	0.446	Hendrick Motorsports	Chevrolet	
66	November 3, 2013	2013†	AAA Texas 500	Texas Motor Speedway	3	4.390	Hendrick Motorsports	Chevrolet	
67	May 25, 2014	2014	Coca-Cola 600	Charlotte Motor Speedway	1	1.272	Hendrick Motorsports	Chevrolet	
68	June 1, 2014	2014	FedEx 400	Dover International Speedway	4	0.885	Hendrick Motorsports	Chevrolet	
69	June 15, 2014	2014	Quicken Loans 400	Michigan International Speedway	7	1.214	Hendrick Motorsports	Chevrolet	
70	November 2, 2014	2014	AAA Texas 500	Texas Motor Speedway	3	0.513	Hendrick Motorsports	Chevrolet	
71	March 1, 2015	2015	Folds of Honor QuikTrip 500	Atlanta Motor Speedway	37	1.802	Hendrick Motorsports	Chevrolet	
72	April 11, 2015	2015	Duck Commander 500	Texas Motor Speedway	5	1.107	Hendrick Motorsports	Chevrolet	
73	May 9–10, 2015	2015	SpongeBob SquarePants 400	Kansas Speedway	19	0.487	Hendrick Motorsports	Chevrolet	
74	May 31, 2015	2015	FedEx 400	Dover International Speedway	14	0.435	Hendrick Motorsports	Chevrolet	
75	November 8, 2015	2015	AAA Texas 500	Texas Motor Speedway	8	1.082	Hendrick Motorsports	Chevrolet	
76	February 28, 2016	2016†	Folds of Honor QuikTrip 500	Atlanta Motor Speedway	19	Caution	Hendrick Motorsports	Chevrolet	
77	March 20, 2016	2016†	Auto Club 400	Auto Club Speedway	19	0.772	Hendrick Motorsports	Chevrolet	
78	October 9, 2016	2016†	Bank of America 500	Charlotte Motor Speedway	11	1.474	Hendrick Motorsports	Chevrolet	
79	October 30, 2016	2016†	Goody's Fast Relief 500	Martinsville Speedway	3	1.291	Hendrick Motorsports	Chevrolet	
80	November 20, 2016	2016†	Ford EcoBoost 400	Homestead-Miami Speedway	14	0.466	Hendrick Motorsports	Chevrolet	
81	April 9, 2017	2017	O'Reilly Auto Parts 500	Texas Motor Speedway	24	0.340	Hendrick Motorsports	Chevrolet	
82	April 24, 2017	2017	Food City 500	Bristol Motor Speedway	11	1.199	Hendrick Motorsports	Chevrolet	
83	June 4, 2017	2017	AAA 400 Drive for Autism	Dover International Speedway	14	Caution	Hendrick Motorsports	Chevrolet	

=== Busch Series ===
In NASCAR's second-level series, variously known as the Busch Series, and Nationwide Series during Johnson's driving career and now as the Xfinity Series, Johnson won a single race, the 2001 Sam's Club Presents the Hills Brothers Coffee 300 at Chicagoland Speedway. That win occurred during the period in which Anheuser-Busch's Busch beer brand was series sponsor.

NASCAR Busch Series victories
No.	Date	Season	Race	Track	Margin	Grid	Team	Car	Ref
1	July 14, 2001	2001	Sam's Club Presents the Hills Brothers Coffee 300	Chicagoland Speedway	4.932	6	Herzog Motorsports	Chevrolet	

=== Number of wins at different tracks ===
The ‡ symbol indicates Johnson won at a track twice in a calendar year.

No.	Track	Years won	Wins
1	Dover International Speedway	2002‡, 2005, 2009‡, 2010, 2012, 2013, 2014, 2015, 2017	11
2	Martinsville Speedway	2004, 2006, 2007‡, 2008, 2009, 2012, 2013, 2016	9
3	Charlotte Motor Speedway	2003, 2004‡, 2005‡, 2009, 2014, 2016	8
4	Texas Motor Speedway	2007, 2012, 2013, 2014, 2015‡, 2017	7
5	Auto Club Speedway	2002, 2007, 2008, 2009, 2010, 2016	6
6	Atlanta Motor Speedway	2004, 2007‡, 2015, 2016	5
7	Indianapolis Motor Speedway	2006, 2008, 2009, 2012	4
8	Las Vegas Motor Speedway	2005, 2006, 2007, 2010	4
9	Phoenix International Raceway	2007, 2008‡, 2009	4
10	Daytona International Speedway	2006, 2013‡	3
11	Darlington Raceway	2004‡, 2012	3
12	Kansas Speedway	2008, 2011, 2015	3
13	New Hampshire Motor Speedway	2003‡, 2010	3
14	Richmond International Raceway	2007‡, 2008	3
15	Pocono Raceway	2004‡, 2013	3
16	Bristol Motor Speedway	2010, 2017	2
17	Talladega Superspeedway	2006, 2011	2
18	Chicagoland Speedway	2001	1
19	Homestead–Miami Speedway	2016	1
20	Michigan International Speedway	2014	1
21	Sonoma Raceway	2010	1
Total number of race wins:			84

== See also ==
- List of all-time NASCAR Cup Series winners
