= Yates Racing =

NASCAR auto racing company

- Owners: Robert Yates; Doug Yates; Max Jones
- Base: Mooresville, North Carolina
- Series: NASCAR Cup Series; Busch Series
- Race drivers: Davey Allison; Robby Gordon; Lake Speed; Ernie Irvan; Kenny Irwin Jr.; Dale Jarrett; Ricky Rudd; Elliott Sadler; Travis Kvapil; David Gilliland; Paul Menard
- Manufacturer: Ford
- Opened: 1989
- Closed: 2009

Career
- Drivers' Championships: 1 – Winston Cup Series (Dale Jarrett, 1999)
- Race victories: 58

Yates Racing was an American stock car racing team that competed in NASCAR through the 2009 season, after which it merged into Richard Petty Motorsports. Previously known as Robert Yates Racing, the team was owned by Doug Yates, who officially owned the team since his father Robert's retirement on December 1, 2007. The Yates family owned the team since purchasing it from Harry Ranier and J. T. Lundy in October 1988.

The team was noted for its strong engine program and its success on superspeedways. Throughout most of its history, the team fielded Ford cars numbered 28, 38 and 88, although in its final season it fielded the number 98.

== Cup Series ==
=== Car No. 28 history ===
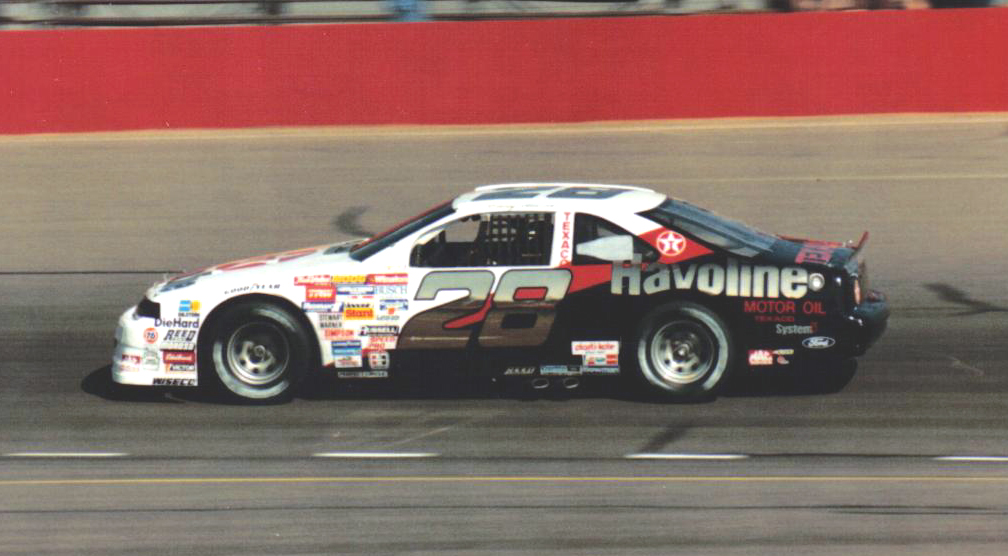
Robert Yates Racing first car in 1989 with Davey Allison driving

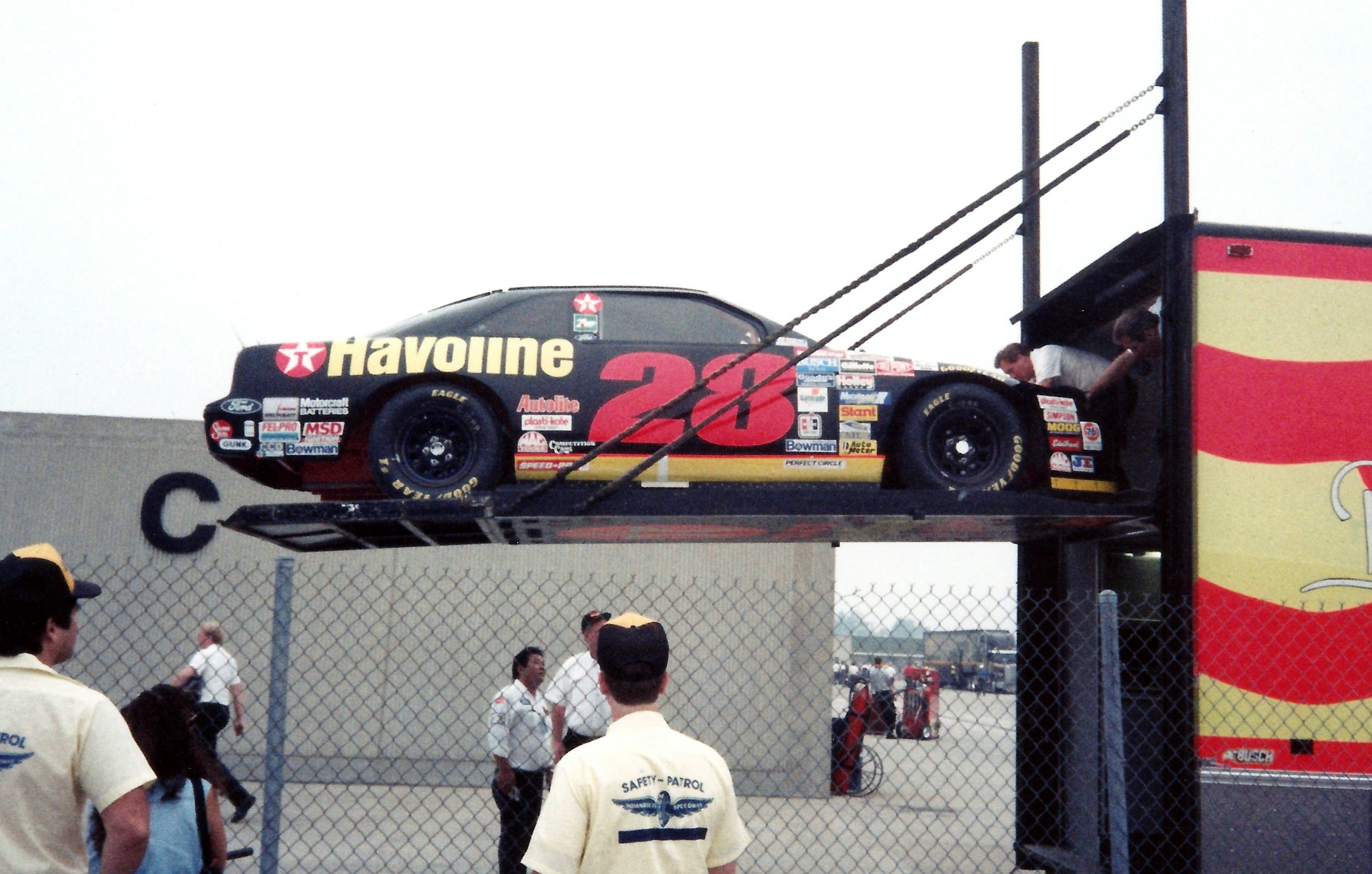
Car No. 28 being unloaded from the transporter at Indianapolis Motor Speedway in 1993.

Davey Allison (1989–1993)

After purchasing the assets of Ranier-Lundy Racing in October 1988, Robert Yates' first driver was Davey Allison, who had driven for the Ranier-Lundy banner since 1987 (his rookie season), and drove the No. 28 Havoline Ford from Yates' takeover of the team until mid-1993, racking up 15 wins and twice finishing 3rd in points. He was tragically killed in a helicopter crash at Talladega Superspeedway in July 1993.

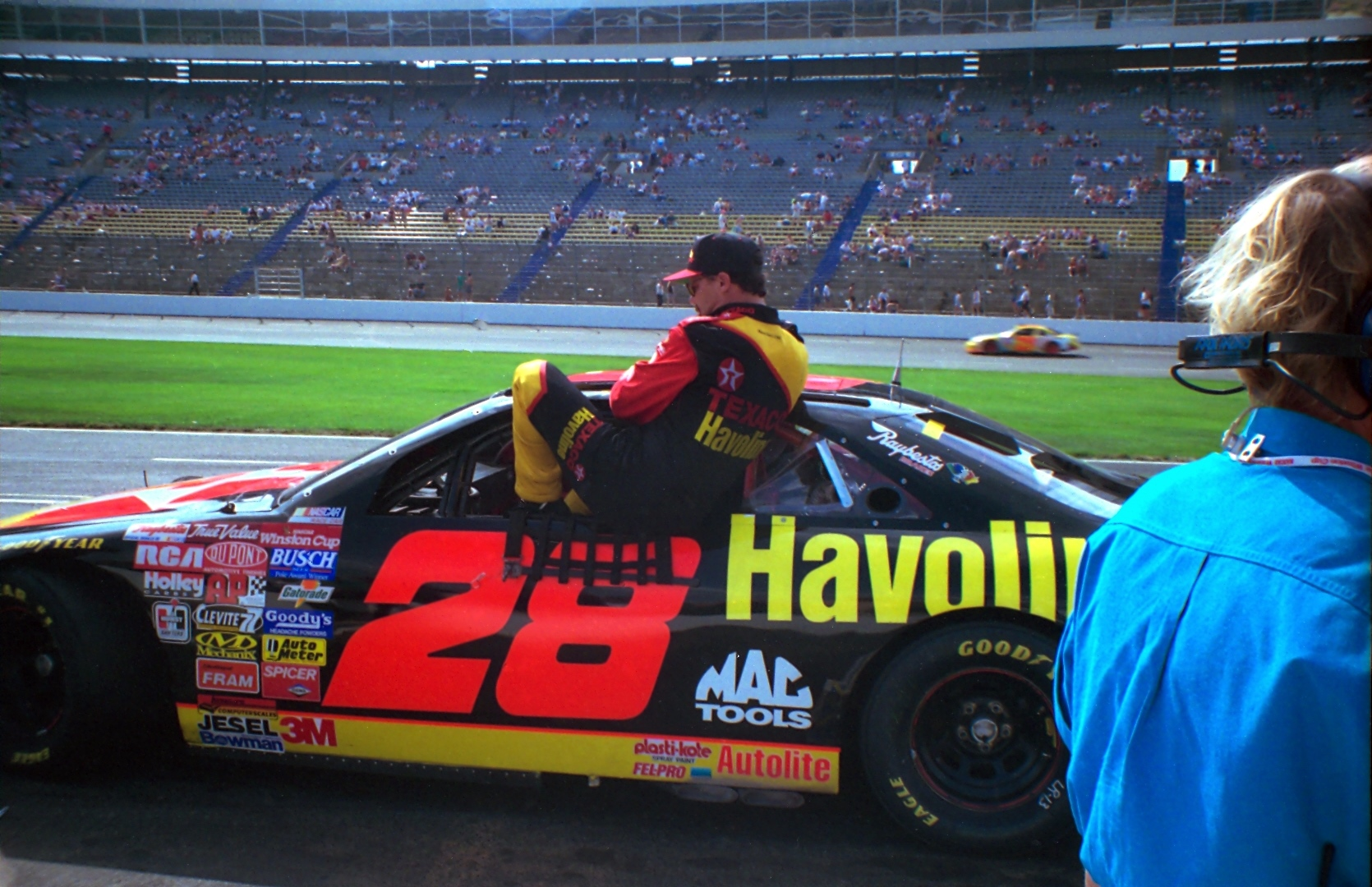
Ernie Irvan entering his car for the first time following injuries at Michigan in 1994.

Ernie Irvan (1993–1994)

After Allison's death, Robby Gordon drove at Talladega later in July and Lake Speed drove in the next three races. Ernie Irvan was then brought over from Morgan-McClure Motorsports to become Allison's permanent replacement. Irvan took over on Labor Day weekend at Darlington, winning at Charlotte and Martinsville before the season concluded.

In 1994, tragedy again struck the No. 28 team. After winning three races, Irvan crashed heavily in a practice session at Michigan and suffered life-threatening injuries. He would not race again in 1994 and it was uncertain whether he would ever return to racing. In the meantime, Kenny Wallace was brought in to take over the Havoline Ford for the remainder of the 1994 season.

Dale Jarrett (1995)

Needing a full-time driver for the 1995 season due to the uncertainty surrounding Irvan's recovery, Yates signed Dale Jarrett away from Joe Gibbs Racing to replace him for the 1995 season. Jarrett won one race at Pocono Raceway and eventually finished the season 13th in the points standings. Irvan would eventually return for three races driving a second car numbered 88 for Yates.

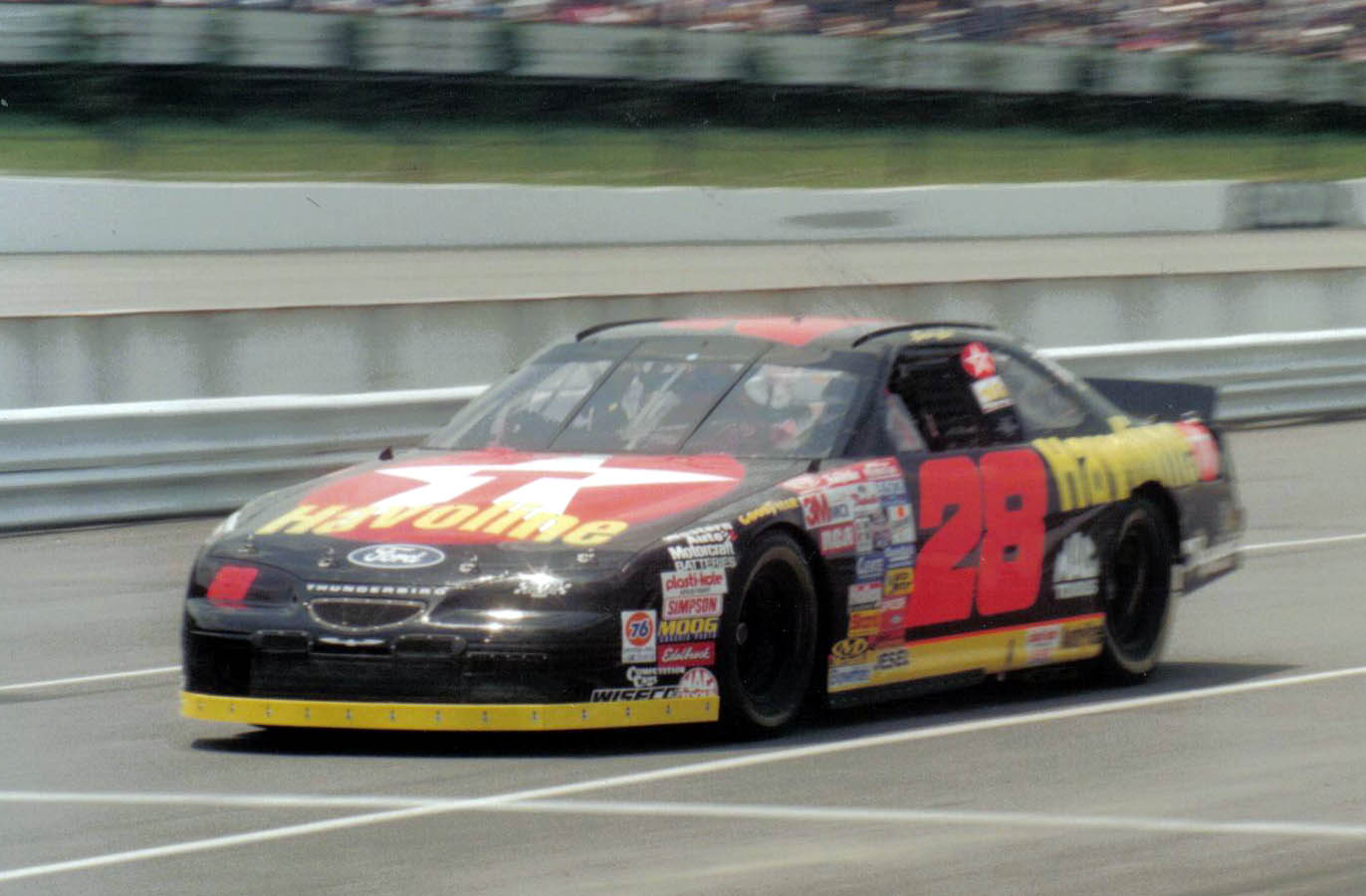
Ernie Irvan's 1997 car

Ernie Irvan (1996–1997)

Irvan returned to the #28 in 1996 and won at New Hampshire. Irvan won at Michigan in June 1997, the same track he almost died on three years earlier. Irvan left at the end of the 1997 season to drive for MB2 Motorsports.

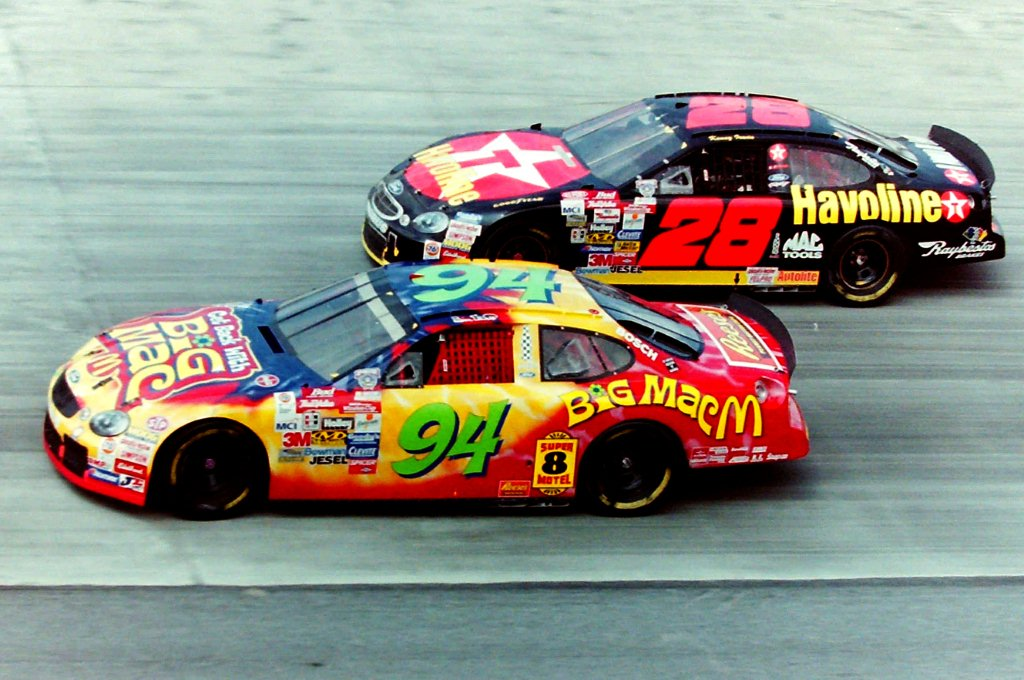
Kenny Irwin Jr. (No. 28) racing Matt Kenseth (Filling in for Bill Elliott) at Dover, 1998

Kenny Irwin Jr. (1998–1999)

Kenny Irwin Jr. drove the No. 28 car for Robert Yates in 1998 and 1999. Despite winning Rookie of the Year honors in 1998, Irwin failed to find victory lane in his two seasons.

Ricky Rudd (2000–2002)

The next season, Ricky Rudd joined the team after his own Rudd Performance Motorsports team was sold. He would go on to drive three seasons in the Havoline Ford, from 2000 to 2002, and won his first race for the team in 2001 at Pocono in June after going winless since 1998. Rudd drove the No. 28 to Victory Lane two additional times, the September Richmond race in 2001 and his final victory at Infineon in June 2002, and finished in the Top 10 in the standings all three seasons, including 4th in 2001, his second-highest career points finish. Rudd left the team to join Wood Brothers Racing in 2003, while Yates hired the Wood's previous driver, Elliott Sadler and Robert Yates switched from No. 28 to No. 38 along with sponsorship from Mars, Inc.

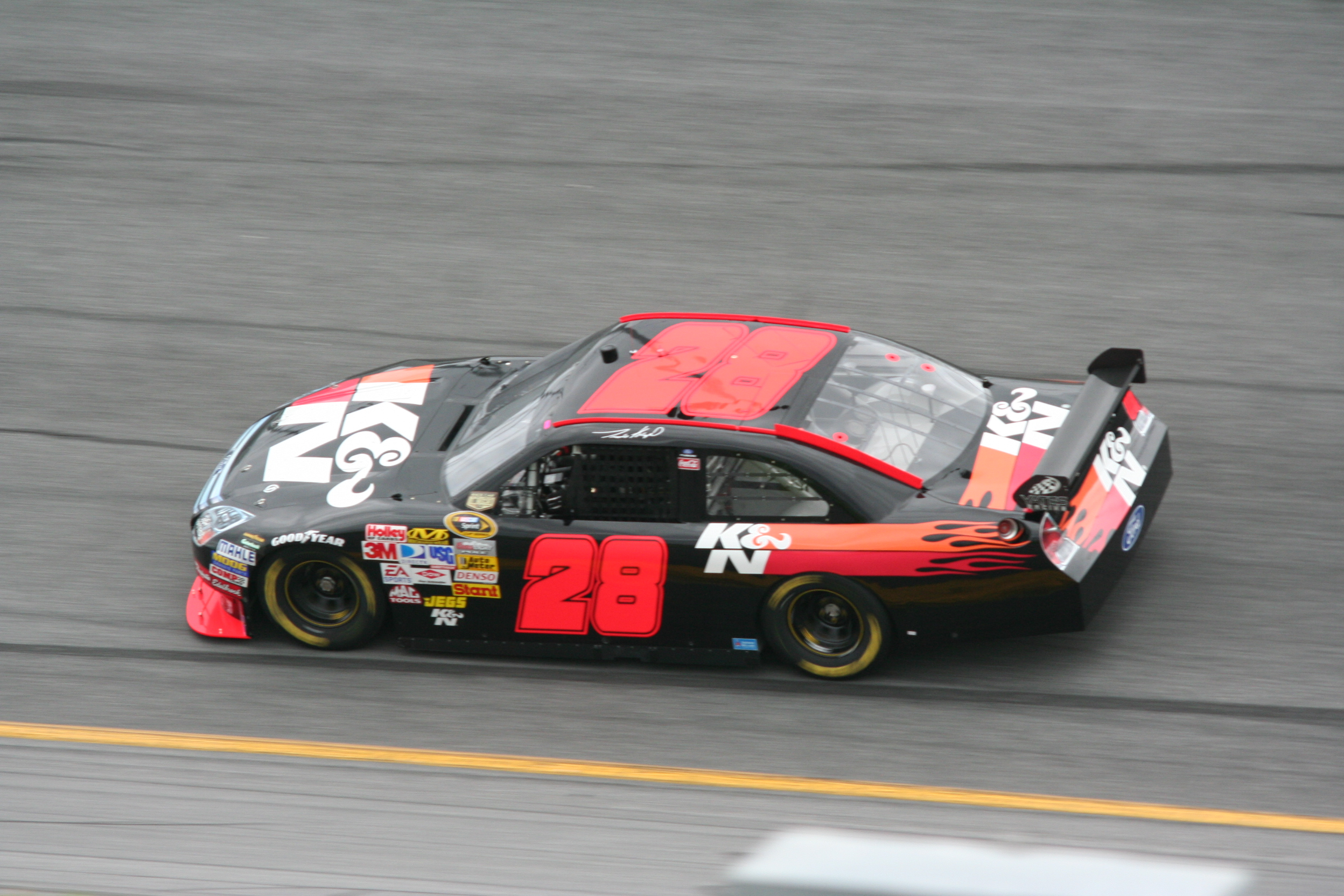
Travis Kvapil drove for Yates Racing in 2008 and the first six races of 2009

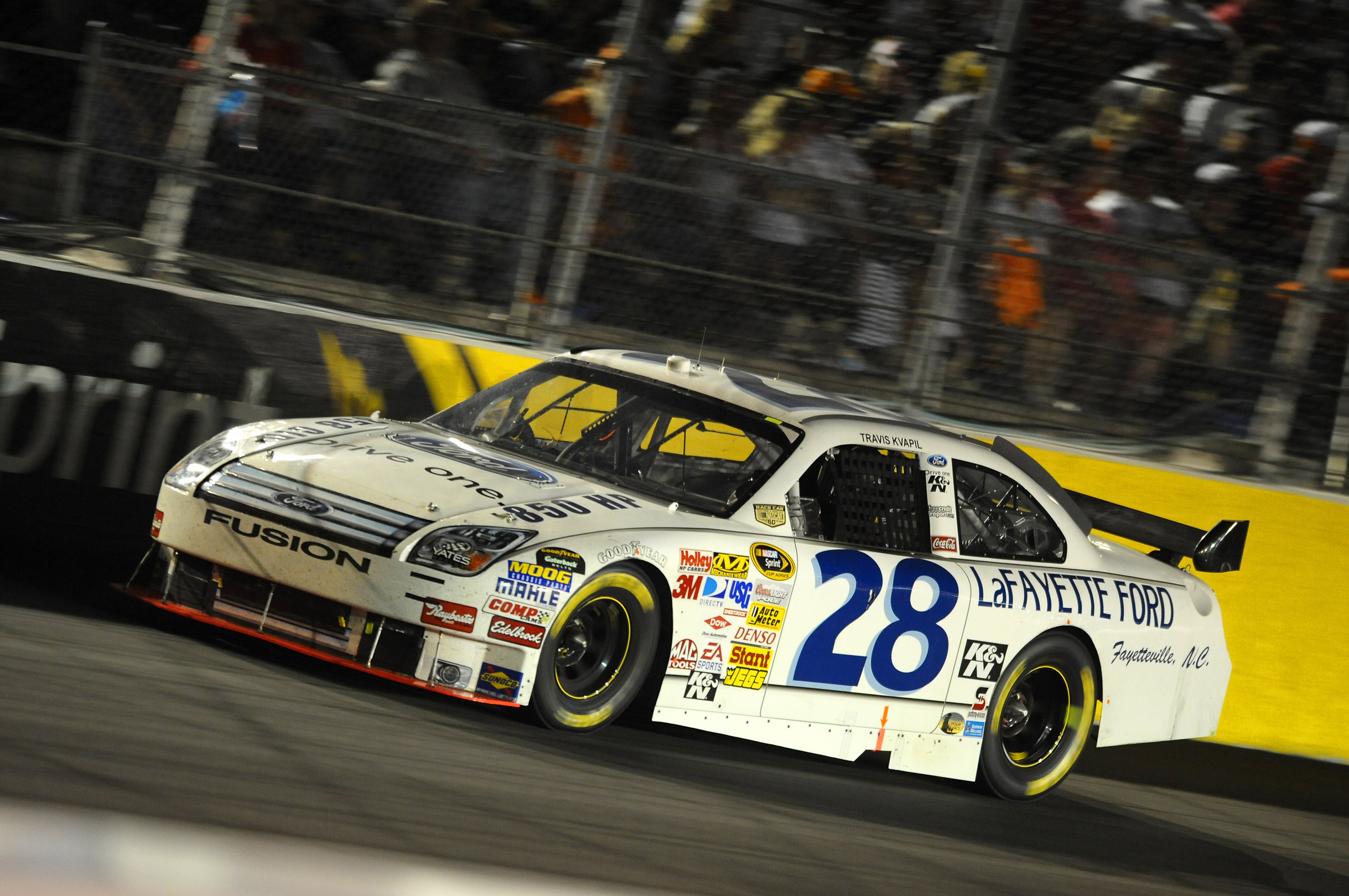
Travis Kvapil in the No. 28 in 2008

Travis Kvapil (2008–2009)

Robert Yates would resurrect the 28 for the 2008 season, however. Yates made the switch after giving the rights to the No. 88 to Hendrick Motorsports for Dale Earnhardt Jr. Travis Kvapil would take over driving duties after Ricky Rudd's departure at the end of 2007. Before the season started, he, along with his teammate, David Gilliland, did not have full-time sponsorship on either of their Yates Racing Fords. However, for the Daytona 500, K&N Filters sponsored his team. Two weeks later, at Las Vegas Motor Speedway, during the UAW-Dodge 400, Kvapil scored an 8th-place finish, giving him his third Top 10 of his career, in an unsponsored ride. Later that week, Zaxby's decided to sponsor the No. 28 team for the next race, which was the Kobalt Tools 500 at Atlanta Motor Speedway. A couple of races later, in the Aaron's 499, he finished 6th with a one race sponsorship deal from Northern Tool and Equipment, which gave him his career best finish in the Cup Series. Just a few weeks after his career best run, Kvapil picked up another Top 10 finish, this time at Darlington Raceway, during the Dodge Challenger 500. Despite the lack of a full-time sponsorship, Travis Kvapil and the No. 28 had a very respectable season, finishing 23rd in the points standings and a pole at Talladega in October.

For 2009, Kvapil's owner points from 2008 were transferred to the No. 98, given that Paul Menard had signed with the team, therefore bringing with him a full-time Menards sponsorship. The future of the No. 28 team was uncertain without a sponsor, and Yates would only field the car for five races unless sponsorship had been found. Despite failing to qualify for the Shelby 427, Kvapil had two 18th-place finishes in five races, with race by race sponsorship from Golden Corral and Farmers Insurance. Unfortunately, the team still lacked a committed full-time sponsor, and Yates shut down the No. 28 following the Food City 500.

==== Car No. 28 results ====
Year	Driver	No.	Make	1	2	3	4	5	6	7	8	9	10	11	12	13	14	15	16	17	18	19	20	21	22	23	24	25	26	27	28	29	30	31	32	33	34	35	36	Owners	Pts
1988	Davey Allison	28	Ford	DAY	RCH	CAR	ATL	DAR	BRI	NWS	MAR	TAL	CLT	DOV	RSD	POC	MCH	DAY	POC	TAL	GLN	MCH	BRI	DAR	RCH	DOV	MAR	CLT; 19	NWS; 11	CAR; 27	PHO; 3	ATL; 2								8th	3631
1989	Davey Allison	28	Ford	DAY; 25	CAR; 6	ATL; 40	RCH; 5	DAR; 2	BRI; 4	NWS; 11	MAR; 14	TAL; 1*	CLT; 33	DOV; 32	SON; 9	POC; 16	MCH; 31	DAY; 1	POC; 6	TAL; 9	GLN; 4	MCH; 7	BRI; 25	DAR; 18	RCH; 10	DOV; 24	MAR; 21	CLT; 5	NWS; 21	CAR; 26	PHO; 39	ATL; 25								11th	3481
1990	Davey Allison	28	Ford	DAY; 20	RCH; 20	CAR; 34	ATL; 13	DAR; 3	BRI; 1	NWS; 9	MAR; 22	TAL; 25	CLT; 7	DOV; 17	SON; 24	POC; 5	MCH; 36	DAY; 24	POC; 5	TAL; 20	GLN; 19	MCH; 6	BRI; 23	DAR; 15	RCH; 16	DOV; 9	MAR; 7	NWS; 26	CLT; 1	CAR; 29	PHO; 11	ATL; 25								13th	3423
1991	Davey Allison	28	Ford	DAY; 15	RCH; 12	CAR; 16	ATL; 40	DAR; 2	BRI; 3	NWS; 6	MAR; 8	TAL; 22	CLT; 1*	DOV; 16	SON; 1	POC; 12	MCH; 1*	DAY; 3	POC; 14	TAL; 9	GLN; 10	MCH; 2*	BRI; 24	DAR; 12	RCH; 2*	DOV; 31	MAR; 29	NWS; 4	CLT; 2	CAR; 1	PHO; 1*	ATL; 17								3rd	4088
1992	Davey Allison	28	Ford	DAY; 1*	CAR; 2	RCH; 4	ATL; 4*	DAR; 4*	BRI; 28	NWS; 1	MAR; 26	TAL; 1*	CLT; 4	DOV; 11	SON; 28	POC; 5	MCH; 1*	DAY; 10	POC; 33*	TAL; 3	GLN; 20	MCH; 5	BRI; 30	DAR; 5	RCH; 19	DOV; 4	MAR; 16	NWS; 11	CLT; 19	CAR; 10	PHO; 1	ATL; 27								3rd	4015
1993	Davey Allison	28	Ford	DAY; 28	CAR; 14	RCH; 1	ATL; 13	DAR; 11	BRI; 5	NWS; 4	MAR; 2	TAL; 7	SON; 15	CLT; 30	DOV; 3	POC; 6	MCH; 35	DAY; 31	NHA; 3	POC																				9th	3845
1993	Robby Gordon	28	Ford																		TAL; 42																			9th	3845
1993	Lake Speed	28	Ford																			GLN; 27	MCH; 7	BRI; 16																9th	3845
1993	Ernie Irvan	28	Ford																						DAR; 5	RCH; 36	DOV; 26	MAR; 1*	NWS; 3	CLT; 1*	CAR; 6	PHO; 2	ATL; 12							9th	3845
1994	Ernie Irvan	28	Ford	DAY; 2*	CAR; 5	RCH; 1*	ATL; 1*	DAR; 6	BRI; 33	NWS; 3*	MAR; 2	TAL; 2*	SON; 1*	CLT; 5	DOV; 2*	POC; 7	MCH; 18	DAY; 2*	NHA; 30*	POC; 37	TAL; 3*	IND; 17	GLN; 2	MCH; Wth^{†}																4th	4195
1994	Kenny Wallace	28	Ford																						BRI; 13	DAR; 11	RCH; 32	DOV; 20	MAR; 4	NWS; 10	CLT; 14	CAR; 15	PHO; 18	ATL; 25						4th	4195
1995	Dale Jarrett	28	Ford	DAY; 5	CAR; 5	RCH; 25	ATL; 5	DAR; 38	BRI; 6	NWS; 11	MAR; 7	TAL; 19	SON; 23	CLT; 32	DOV; 40	POC; 38	MCH; 6	DAY; 42	NHA; 30	POC; 1	TAL; 2	IND; 3	GLN; 17	MCH; 33	BRI; 3*	DAR; 28	RCH; 4	DOV; 30	MAR; 10	NWS; 7	CLT; 5	CAR; 23	PHO; 11	ATL; 31						13th	3584
1996	Ernie Irvan	28	Ford	DAY; 35	CAR; 14	RCH; 38	ATL; 4	DAR; 33	BRI; 16	NWS; 6	MAR; 2	TAL; 31	SON; 42	CLT; 9	DOV; 4	POC; 39	MCH; 5	DAY; 5	NHA; 1	POC; 4	TAL; 4	IND; 2	GLN; 35	MCH; 4	BRI; 36	DAR; 7	RCH; 1	DOV; 36	MAR; 12	NWS; 36	CLT; 37	CAR; 4	PHO; 7	ATL; 36						10th	3632
1997	Ernie Irvan	28	Ford	DAY; 20	CAR; 9	RCH; 36	ATL; 2	DAR; 21	TEX; 36	BRI; 39	MAR; 31	SON; 8	TAL; 10	CLT; 13*	DOV; 30	POC; 29	MCH; 1	CAL; 37	DAY; 9	NHA; 8	POC; 40	IND; 10*	GLN; 21	MCH; 4	BRI; 41	DAR; 33	RCH; 23	NHA; 2	DOV; 9	MAR; 10	CLT; 18	TAL; 5	CAR; 28	PHO; 18	ATL; 12					14th	3534
1998	Kenny Irwin Jr.	28	Ford	DAY; 19	CAR; 26	LVS; 36	ATL; 5*	DAR; 39	BRI; 43	TEX; 39	MAR; 19	TAL; 40	CAL; 16	CLT; DNQ	DOV; 33	RCH; 9	MCH; 13	POC; 11	SON; 9	NHA; 33	POC; 22	IND; 38	GLN; 37	MCH; 16	BRI; 15	NHA; 11	DAR; 41	RCH; 10	DOV; 40	MAR; 27	CLT; 20	TAL; 43	DAY; 32	PHO; 40	CAR; 33	ATL; 16				28th	2760
1999	Kenny Irwin Jr.	28	Ford	DAY; 3	CAR; 23	LVS; 41	ATL; 23	DAR; 35	TEX; 15	BRI; 11	MAR; 36	TAL; 35	CAL; 13	RCH; 40	CLT; 15	DOV; 10	MCH; 11	POC; 18	SON; 22	DAY; 14	NHA; 26	POC; 43	IND; 13	GLN; 26	MCH; 34	BRI; 24	DAR; 31	RCH; 5	NHA; 10	DOV; 10	MAR; 39	CLT; 15	TAL; 10	CAR; 13	PHO; 21	HOM; 33	ATL; 29			19th	3338
2000	Ricky Rudd	28	Ford	DAY; 15	CAR; 6	LVS; 12	ATL; 11	DAR; 17	BRI; 14	TEX; 10	MAR; 22	TAL; 27	CAL; 4	RCH; 4	CLT; 17	DOV; 5	MCH; 12	POC; 3	SON; 5	DAY; 5	NHA; 10	POC; 38	IND; 21	GLN; 11	MCH; 2	BRI; 10	DAR; 8	RCH; 9	NHA; 3	DOV; 3	MAR; 4	CLT; 3*	TAL; 11	CAR; 3	PHO; 37	HOM; 6	ATL; 24			5th	4575
2001	Ricky Rudd	28	Ford	DAY; 4	CAR; 39	LVS; 19	ATL; 6	DAR; 8	BRI; 10	TEX; 37	MAR; 2	TAL; 14	CAL; 6	RCH; 5	CLT; 7	DOV; 10	MCH; 2	POC; 1	SON; 4	DAY; 14	CHI; 3	NHA; 3	POC; 11	IND; 39	GLN; 4	MCH; 42	BRI; 4	DAR; 7	RCH; 1	DOV; 3	KAN; 3	CLT; 21	MAR; 39	TAL; 26	PHO; 3	CAR; 8	HOM; 21	ATL; 35	NHA; 13	4th	4706
2002	Ricky Rudd	28	Ford	DAY; 38	CAR; 18	LVS; 13	ATL; 20	DAR; 12	BRI; 3	TEX; 4	MAR; 7	TAL; 14	CAL; 3	RCH; 39	CLT; 4	DOV; 19	POC; 17*	MCH; 8	SON; 1	DAY; 15	CHI; 19	NHA; 17	POC; 10	IND; 18	GLN; 5	MCH; 12	BRI; 39	DAR; 30	RCH; 7	NHA; 12	DOV; 14	KAN; 20	TAL; 3	CLT; 39	MAR; 3	ATL; 32	CAR; 20	PHO; 13	HOM; 19	10th	4323
2008	Travis Kvapil	28	Ford	DAY; 30	CAL; 36	LVS; 8	ATL; 29	BRI; 27	MAR; 18	TEX; 18	PHO; 22	TAL; 6	RCH; 16	DAR; 8	CLT; 26	DOV; 11	POC; 23	MCH; 16	SON; 22	NHA; 36	DAY; 31	CHI; 41	IND; 36	POC; 16	GLN; 36	MCH; 13	BRI; 24	CAL; 28	RCH; 17	NHA; 26	DOV; 23	KAN; 34	TAL; 27	CLT; 42	MAR; 19	ATL; 23	TEX; 32	PHO; 21	HOM; 7	23rd	3384
2009	Travis Kvapil	28	Ford	DAY; 42	CAL; 18	LVS; DNQ	ATL; 42	BRI; 18	MAR	TEX	PHO	TAL	RCH	DAR	CLT	DOV	POC	MCH	SON	NHA	DAY	CHI	IND	POC	GLN	MCH	BRI	ATL	RCH	NHA	DOV	KAN	CAL	CLT	MAR	TAL	TEX	PHO	HOM	49th	378
^{†} - Withdrew after getting injured in practice

=== Car No. 38 history ===
Elliott Sadler (2003–2006)

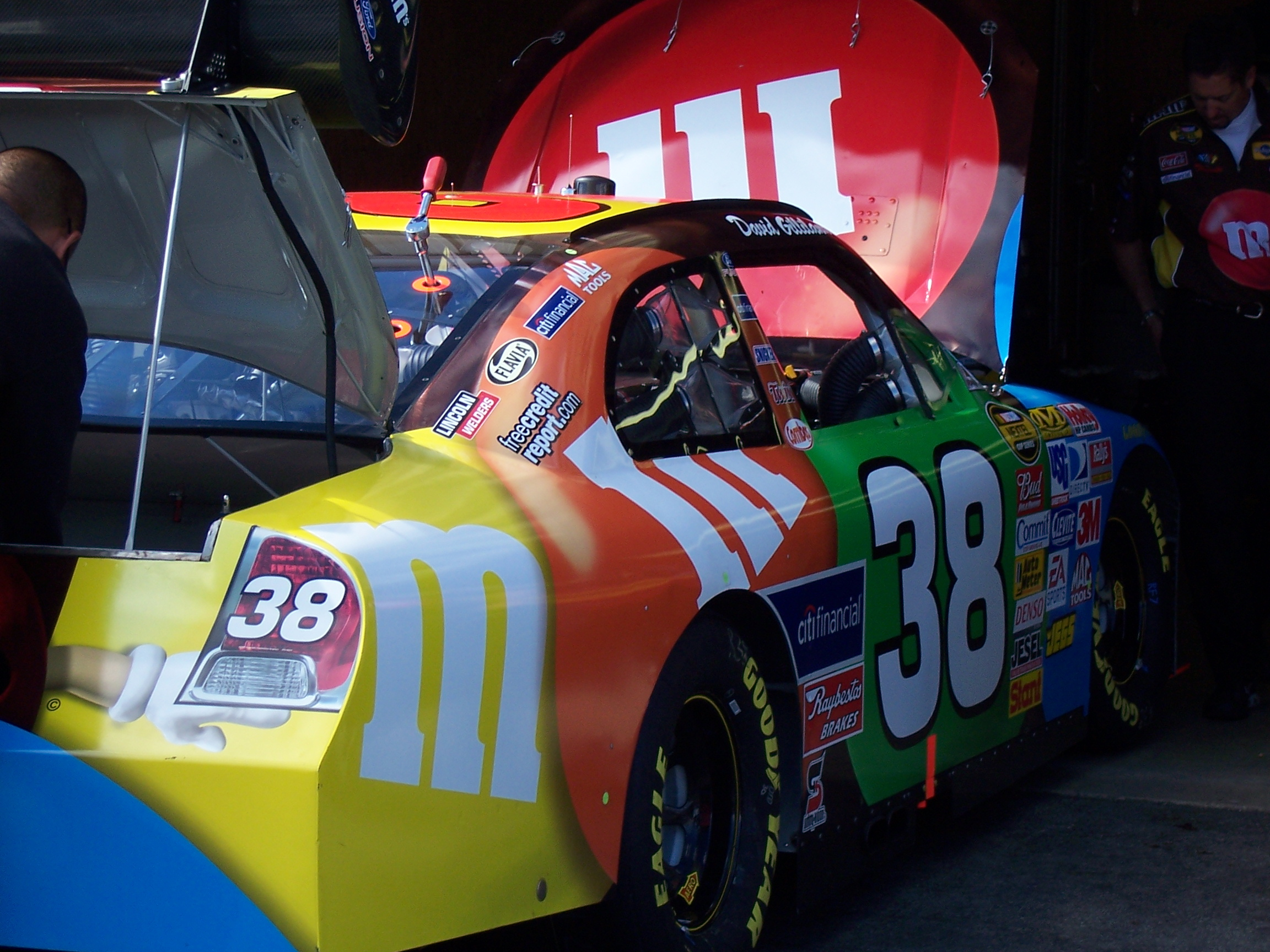
The No. 38 car driven by David Gilliland in 2007.

Elliott Sadler was hired in 2003, and Yates brought in M&M's as the sponsor, replacing the longtime sponsor Havoline. Yates also changed the car's number from 28 to 38. Sadler collected two victories for the team, and finished a career-best 9th in points in 2004. On August 14, 2006, Sadler left for Evernham Motorsports to drive the No. 19.

David Gilliland (2006–2008)

David Gilliland replaced Sadler in the No. 38, beginning with the GFS Marketplace 400 at Michigan. He finished out the 2006 season, and continued to drive the No. 38 in 2007, after which M&M's left the team for Joe Gibbs Racing's No. 18 car. Gilliland drove for Yates again in 2008 and on May 9, it was announced that FreeCreditReport.com would sponsor the car for the remainder of the 2008 season. Later in the year, Gilliland would record his best career finish of second at Infineon Raceway, and finished 27th in the points standings.

The No. 38's owner points were sold to Hall of Fame Racing to field the No. 96, but Yates switched the No. 28's owners points to the 98. After the team was unable to find sponsorship, Gilliland was released from his contract. Gilliland later went on to TRG Motorsports for some races in 2009.

==== Car No. 38 results ====
Year	Driver	No.	Make	1	2	3	4	5	6	7	8	9	10	11	12	13	14	15	16	17	18	19	20	21	22	23	24	25	26	27	28	29	30	31	32	33	34	35	36	Owners	Pts
2003	Elliott Sadler	38	Ford	DAY; 23	CAR; 9	LVS; 42	ATL; 6	DAR; 7	BRI; 21	TEX; 41*	TAL; 3	MAR; 5	CAL; 23	RCH; 37	CLT; 36	DOV; 33	POC; 9	MCH; 17	SON; 22	DAY; 24	CHI; 9	NHA; 27	POC; 14	IND; 42	GLN; 15	MCH; 12	BRI; 38	DAR; 9	RCH; 39	NHA; 8	DOV; 19	TAL; 30	KAN; 42	CLT; 43	MAR; 28	ATL; 17	PHO; 20	CAR; 21	HOM; 21	22nd	3525
2004	Elliott Sadler	38	Ford	DAY; 7	CAR; 18	LVS; 6	ATL; 29	DAR; 5	BRI; 14	TEX; 1	MAR; 12	TAL; 28	CAL; 22	RCH; 12	CLT; 5	DOV; 18	POC; 12	MCH; 5	SON; 10	DAY; 26	CHI; 21	NHA; 15	POC; 10	IND; 3	GLN; 15	MCH; 32	BRI; 5	CAL; 1	RCH; 17	NHA; 8	DOV; 20	TAL; 22	KAN; 4	CLT; 7	MAR; 32	ATL; 36	PHO; 38	DAR; 23	HOM; 34	9th	6024
2005	Elliott Sadler	38	Ford	DAY; 11	CAL; 8	LVS; 29	ATL; 10	BRI; 2	MAR; 9	TEX; 28	PHO; 11	TAL; 6	DAR; 20	RCH; 7	CLT; 13	DOV; 10	POC; 21	MCH; 8	SON; 6	DAY; 21	CHI; 37	NHA; 39	POC; 16	IND; 32	GLN; 12	MCH; 39	BRI; 13	CAL; 17	RCH; 17	NHA; 30	DOV; 6	TAL; 34	KAN; 12	CLT; 27*	MAR; 29	ATL; 10	TEX; 9	PHO; 11	HOM; 23	13th	4084
2006	Elliott Sadler	38	Ford	DAY; 4	CAL; 23	LVS; 14	ATL; 29	BRI; 13	MAR; 6	TEX; 33	PHO; 37	TAL; 16	RCH; 13	DAR; 29	CLT; 30	DOV; 40	POC; 20	MCH; 22	SON; 8	DAY; 6	CHI; 29	NHA; 25	POC; 32	IND; 43	GLN; 7															25th	3326
2006	David Gilliland	38	Ford																							MCH; 38	BRI; 40	CAL; 32	RCH; 36	NHA; 36	DOV; 27	KAN; 22	TAL; 15	CLT; 33	MAR; 28	ATL; 15	TEX; 21	PHO; 16	HOM; 33	25th	3326
2007	David Gilliland	38	Ford	DAY; 8	CAL; 25	LVS; 21	ATL; 30	BRI; 41	MAR; 39	TEX; 19	PHO; 35	TAL; 4	RCH; 42	DAR; 30	CLT; 35	DOV; 29	POC; 34	MCH; 17	SON; 25	NHA; 28	DAY; 11	CHI; 16	IND; 17	POC; 39	GLN; 33	MCH; 28	BRI; 30	CAL; 25	RCH; 22	NHA; 39	DOV; 24	KAN; 34	TAL; 27	CLT; 25	MAR; 25	ATL; 42	TEX; 28	PHO; 28	HOM; 32	28th	2924
2008	David Gilliland	38	Ford	DAY; 28	CAL; 17	LVS; 23	ATL; 32	BRI; 9	MAR; 24	TEX; 15	PHO; 15	TAL; 15	RCH; 41	DAR; 20	CLT; 40	DOV; 16	POC; 16	MCH; 27	SON; 2	NHA; 28	DAY; 40	CHI; 42	IND; 20	POC; 34	GLN; 40	MCH; 26	BRI; 22	CAL; 23	RCH; 18	NHA; 41	DOV; 19	KAN; 22	TAL; 40	CLT; 25	MAR; 32	ATL; 27	TEX; 42	PHO; 35	HOM; 27	27th	3064

=== Car No. 88 history ===
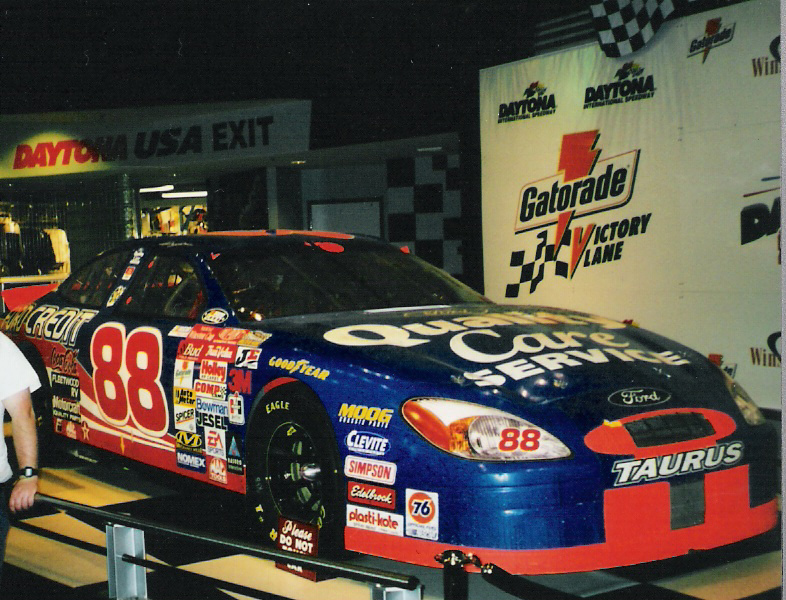
The No. 88 on display at Daytona International Speedway

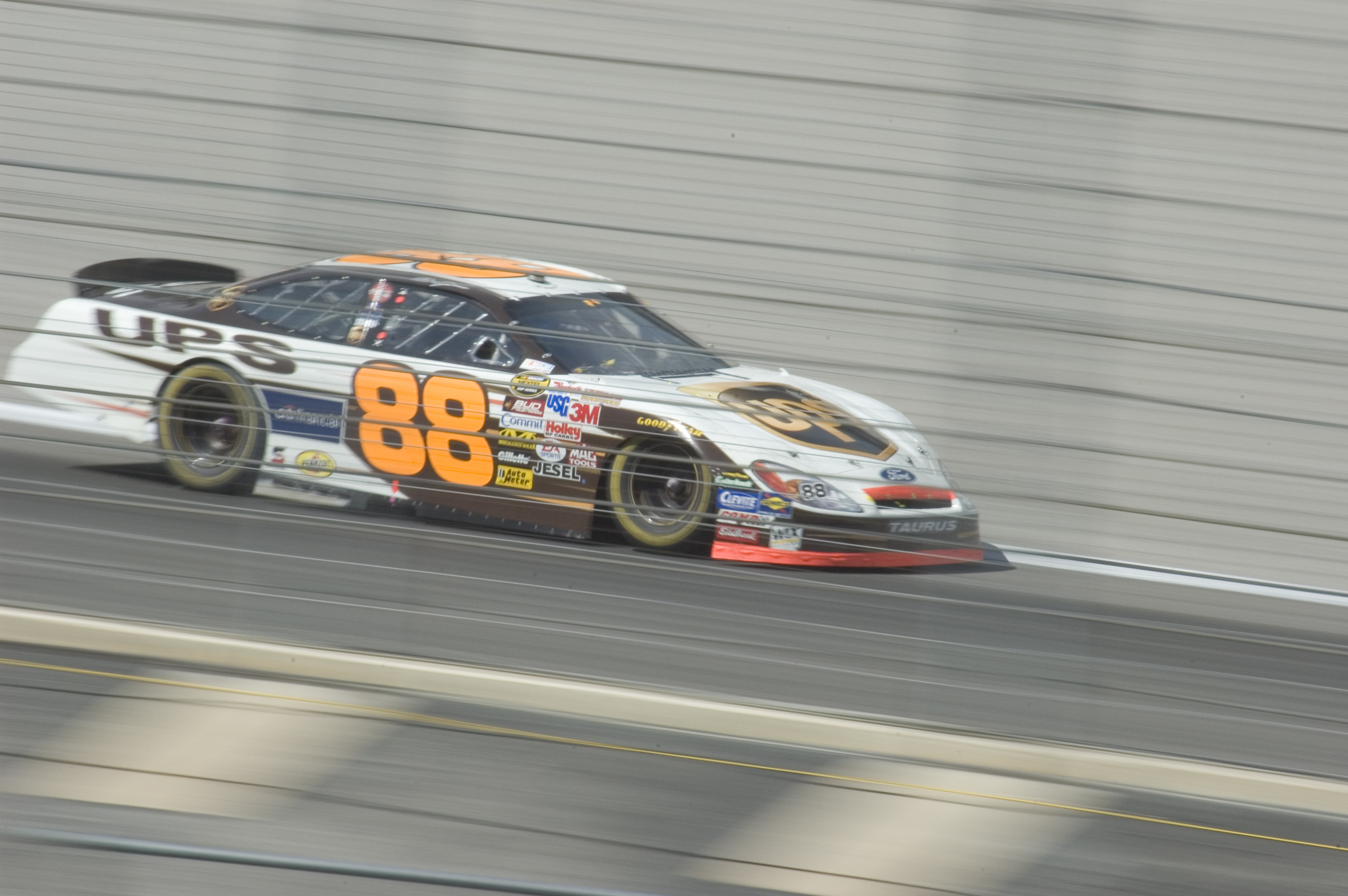
The No. 88 driven by Dale Jarrett in 2005

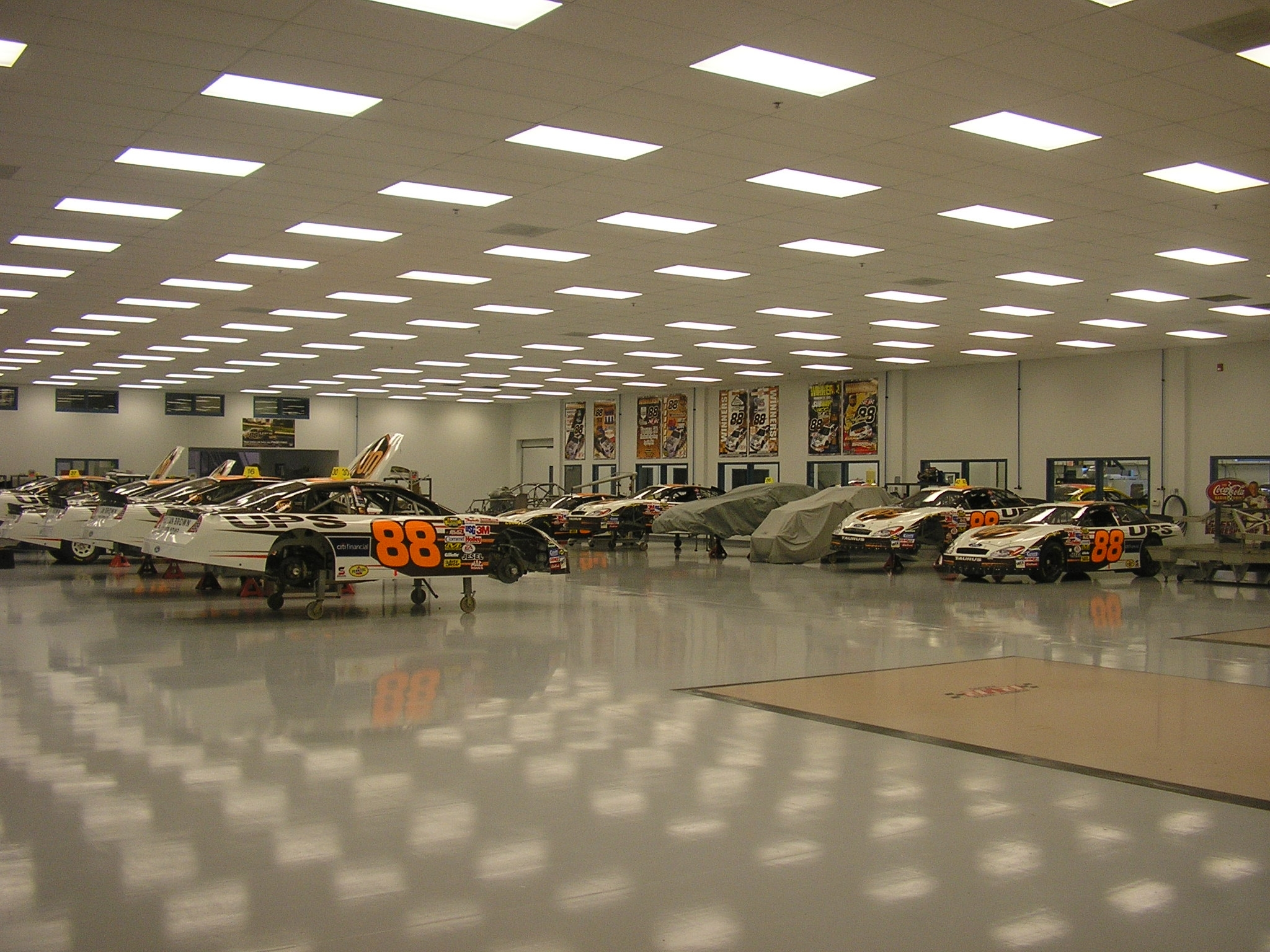
Yates Racing garage in Mooresville, North Carolina.

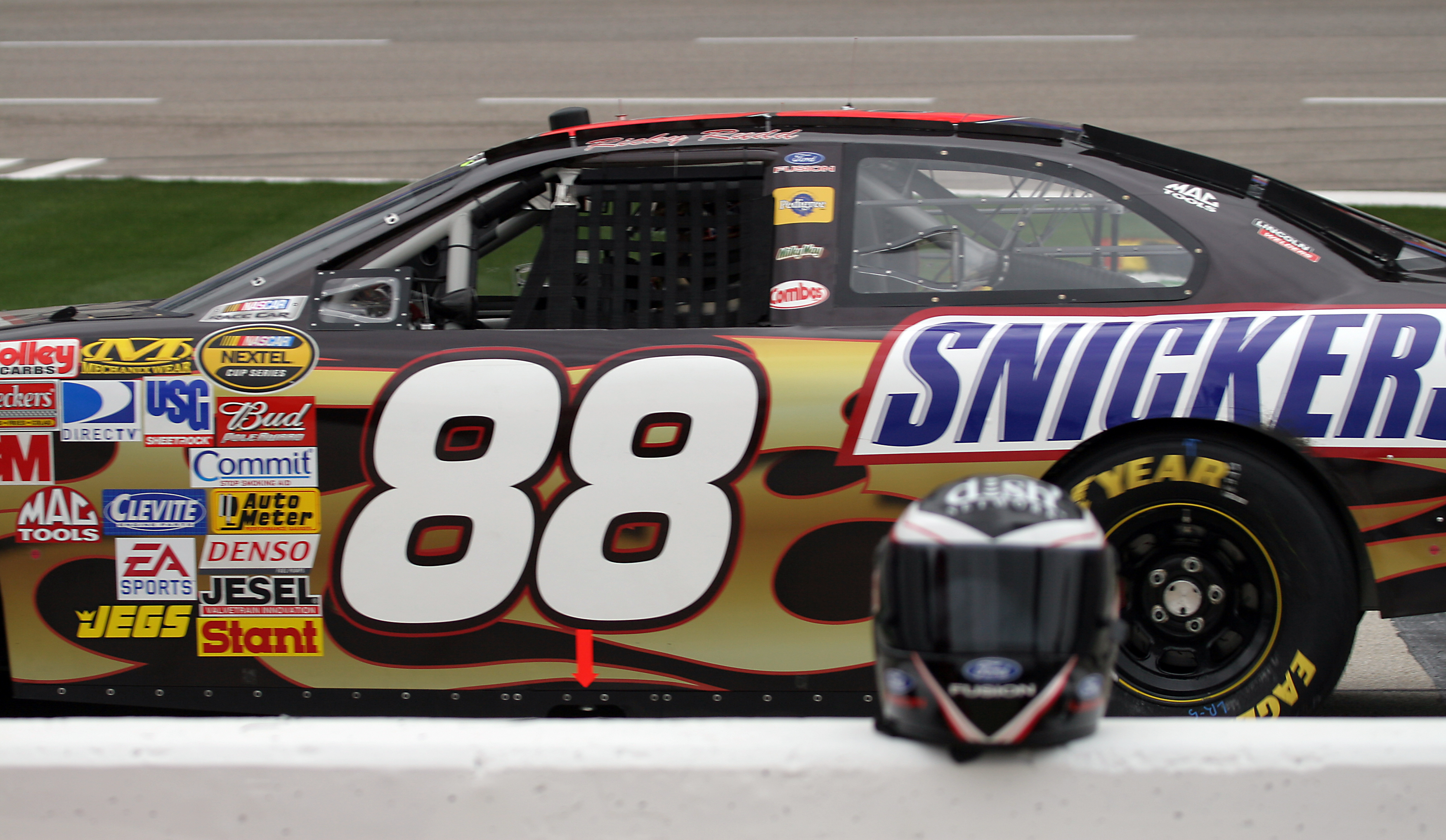
The No. 88 driven by Ricky Rudd in 2007

Ernie Irvan (1995)

The No. 88 team began racing for RYR in 1995 with Havoline as the primary sponsor, as Ernie Irvan drove the car in three races following his comeback from injuries.

Dale Jarrett (1996–2006)

Irvan returned to the No. 28 the following year, and Dale Jarrett began driving the No. 88 in 1996 with sponsorship from Ford Quality Care and Ford Credit. Jarrett won the 1996 Daytona 500 in his first race in the No. 88, defeating Dale Earnhardt for the second time in four years. Jarrett went on to win the Coca-Cola 600 at Charlotte in May, the Brickyard 400, and Michigan in August. Jarrett finished 3rd in the Winston Cup point standings behind Hendrick Motorsports teammates Terry Labonte (the Champion) and Jeff Gordon. In 1997 Jarrett won at Atlanta and Darlington in March, Pocono in July, Bristol in August, Charlotte in October, and Phoenix in November.

Over the years, Jarrett collected 29 victories (the most wins for any driver for RYR) and he won the Winston Cup championship in 1999. He also finished in the Top 10 in points seven consecutive seasons from 1996 through 2002. The sponsorship on the No. 88 car changed from Ford Quality Care to UPS in 2001. Jarrett and sponsor UPS left RYR at the end of the 2006 season for Michael Waltrip Racing.

Ricky Rudd (2007)

Despite off-season rumors of the No. 88 being shut down and becoming a one-car team, Ricky Rudd returned to RYR, this time in the No. 88 with sponsorship from Snickers. Rudd officially announced his retirement from racing on August 20. On September 14, 2007, it was revealed that Yates transferred the No. 88 to Hendrick Motorsports for Dale Earnhardt Jr.'s new car. Travis Kvapil would be in the car full-time, with the car switching to No. 28 in the 2008 season, 20 years since the Yates family took over Ranier-Lundy Racing.

==== Car No. 88 results ====
Year	Driver	No.	Make	1	2	3	4	5	6	7	8	9	10	11	12	13	14	15	16	17	18	19	20	21	22	23	24	25	26	27	28	29	30	31	32	33	34	35	36	Owners	Pts
1995	Ernie Irvan	88	Ford	DAY	CAR	RCH	ATL	DAR	BRI	NWS	MAR	TAL	SON	CLT	DOV	POC	MCH	DAY	NHA	POC	TAL	IND	GLN	MCH	BRI	DAR	RCH	DOV	MAR	NWS; 6	CLT	CAR; DNQ	PHO; 40*	ATL; 7							
1996	Dale Jarrett	88	Ford	DAY; 1	CAR; 2	RCH; 2	ATL; 11	DAR; 15	BRI; 6	NWS; 11	MAR; 29	TAL; 2	SON; 12	CLT; 1*	DOV; 36	POC; 38	MCH; 10	DAY; 6	NHA; 2	POC; 3	TAL; 2	IND; 1	GLN; 24	MCH; 1	BRI; 4	DAR; 14	RCH; 4	DOV; 3	MAR; 16	NWS; 3	CLT; 3	CAR; 2*	PHO; 8	ATL; 2						3rd	4568
1997	Dale Jarrett	88	Ford	DAY; 23	CAR; 2*	RCH; 3*	ATL; 1*	DAR; 1*	TEX; 2	BRI; 4	MAR; 16	SON; 4	TAL; 35	CLT; 27	DOV; 32*	POC; 3	MCH; 6	CAL; 8	DAY; 5	NHA; 38	POC; 1*	IND; 3	GLN; 32	MCH; 5	BRI; 1*	DAR; 3	RCH; 1	NHA; 6	DOV; 5	MAR; 12	CLT; 1	TAL; 21	CAR; 2	PHO; 1	ATL; 2					2nd	4696
1998	Dale Jarrett	88	Ford	DAY; 34	CAR; 7	LVS; 40	ATL; 2	DAR; 1	BRI; 3	TEX; 11	MAR; 3	TAL; 3	CAL; 41	CLT; 5	DOV; 1	RCH; 2*	MCH; 2	POC; 3	SON; 15	NHA; 7	POC; 5	IND; 16	GLN; 5	MCH; 3	BRI; 4	NHA; 4	DAR; 3	RCH; 16	DOV; 7	MAR; 42	CLT; 24	TAL; 1	DAY; 23	PHO; 32	CAR; 2*	ATL; 2				3rd	4619
1999	Dale Jarrett	88	Ford	DAY; 37	CAR; 2	LVS; 11	ATL; 5	DAR; 4	TEX; 2	BRI; 3	MAR; 8	TAL; 2	CAL; 5	RCH; 1	CLT; 5	DOV; 5	MCH; 1*	POC; 3*	SON; 6	DAY; 1	NHA; 4	POC; 2	IND; 1*	GLN; 4	MCH; 4	BRI; 38	DAR; 16	RCH; 3	NHA; 18	DOV; 3	MAR; 10	CLT; 7	TAL; 2	CAR; 4*	PHO; 6	HOM; 5	ATL; 2			1st	5262
2000	Dale Jarrett	88	Ford	DAY; 1*	CAR; 5	LVS; 7	ATL; 36	DAR; 2	BRI; 21	TEX; 33	MAR; 5	TAL; 17	CAL; 9	RCH; 3	CLT; 5	DOV; 4	MCH; 4	POC; 2	SON; 7	DAY; 2*	NHA; 7	POC; 4*	IND; 7	GLN; 7	MCH; 4	BRI; 9	DAR; 5	RCH; 31	NHA; 4	DOV; 32	MAR; 6	CLT; 40	TAL; 15	CAR; 1	PHO; 10	HOM; 17	ATL; 15			4th	4684
2001	Dale Jarrett	88	Ford	DAY; 22	CAR; 10	LVS; 2	ATL; 4	DAR; 1	BRI; 16	TEX; 1*	MAR; 1	TAL; 18	CAL; 24	RCH; 15	CLT; 8	DOV; 5	MCH; 18	POC; 3	SON; 26	DAY; 11	CHI; 4	NHA; 1	POC; 41	IND; 12	GLN; 31	MCH; 37	BRI; 6	DAR; 34	RCH; 4	DOV; 12	KAN; 30	CLT; 6	MAR; 2	TAL; 25	PHO; 9	CAR; 4	HOM; 41	ATL; 8	NHA; 10	5th	4612
2002	Dale Jarrett	88	Ford	DAY; 14	CAR; 42	LVS; 7	ATL; 13	DAR; 40	BRI; 29	TEX; 24*	MAR; 4	TAL; 6	CAL; 6	RCH; 38	CLT; 19	DOV; 5	POC; 1	MCH; 2*	SON; 15	DAY; 35	CHI; 11	NHA; 3	POC; 4	IND; 10	GLN; 37	MCH; 1	BRI; 28	DAR; 5	RCH; 31	NHA; 7	DOV; 3	KAN; 39	TAL; 9	CLT; 14	MAR; 8	ATL; 3	CAR; 12	PHO; 9	HOM; 15	9th	4415
2003	Dale Jarrett	88	Ford	DAY; 10	CAR; 1	LVS; 41	ATL; 21	DAR; 18	BRI; 36	TEX; 13	TAL; 12	MAR; 20	CAL; 37	RCH; 36	CLT; 9	DOV; 39	POC; 42	MCH; 32	SON; 42	DAY; 10	CHI; 30	NHA; 7	POC; 21	IND; 39	GLN; 7	MCH; 23	BRI; 7	DAR; 34	RCH; 21	NHA; 41	DOV; 18	TAL; 19	KAN; 33	CLT; 22	MAR; 11	ATL; 12	PHO; 29	CAR; 38	HOM; 26	26th	3358
2004	Dale Jarrett	88	Ford	DAY; 10	CAR; 40	LVS; 11	ATL; 9	DAR; 32	BRI; 21	TEX; 18	MAR; 10	TAL; 16	CAL; 24	RCH; 13	CLT; 18	DOV; 11	POC; 26	MCH; 3	SON; 18	DAY; 16	CHI; 3	NHA; 9	POC; 24	IND; 2	GLN; 27	MCH; 3	BRI; 10	CAL; 8	RCH; 26	NHA; 27	DOV; 4	TAL; 3	KAN; 8	CLT; 6	MAR; 37	ATL; 15	PHO; 22	DAR; 37	HOM; 24	15th	4214
2005	Dale Jarrett	88	Ford	DAY; 15	CAL; 11	LVS; 18	ATL; 23	BRI; 5	MAR; 14	TEX; 14	PHO; 23	TAL; 9	DAR; 15	RCH; 34	CLT; 8	DOV; 23	POC; 13	MCH; 24	SON; 5	DAY; 5	CHI; 18	NHA; 16	POC; 15	IND; 14	GLN; 22	MCH; 34	BRI; 31	CAL; 24	RCH; 39	NHA; 18	DOV; 15	TAL; 1	KAN; 38	CLT; 30	MAR; 31	ATL; 14	TEX; 12	PHO; 9	HOM; 17	15th	3960
2006	Dale Jarrett	88	Ford	DAY; 10	CAL; 17	LVS; 19	ATL; 9	BRI; 20	MAR; 15	TEX; 17	PHO; 19	TAL; 12	RCH; 21	DAR; 24	CLT; 43	DOV; 24	POC; 38	MCH; 20	SON; 34	DAY; 22	CHI; 31	NHA; 31	POC; 28	IND; 28	GLN; 26	MCH; 36	BRI; 15	CAL; 10	RCH; 21	NHA; 28	DOV; 15	KAN; 4	TAL; 12	CLT; 41	MAR; 16	ATL; 11	TEX; 29	PHO; 39	HOM; 31	23rd	3438
2007	Ricky Rudd	88	Ford	DAY; 26	CAL; 27	LVS; 30	ATL; 26	BRI; 38	MAR; 13	TEX; 33	PHO; 26	TAL; 33	RCH; 37	DAR; 26	CLT; 7	DOV; 39	POC; 27	MCH; 22	SON; 11	NHA; 30	DAY; 31	CHI; 21	IND; 24	POC; 13	GLN; 38	MCH; 33	BRI; 38	CAL; 40						CLT; 11	MAR; 27	ATL; 17	TEX; 15	PHO; 35	HOM; 21	30th	3005
2007	Kenny Wallace	88	Ford																										RCH; 28	NHA; 34	DOV; 23	KAN; 40								30th	3005
2007	Mike Wallace	88	Ford																														TAL; 19							30th	3005

=== Car No. 98 history ===
Stephen Leicht (2006)

The No. 98 car debuted in 2006 as the No. 90 Ford sponsored by Citigroup. Stephen Leicht would make the team's first race at Pocono Raceway, starting 36th and finishing 33rd. They also attempted the Brickyard 400 with Leicht but failed to qualify.

Paul Menard (2009)

In 2009, Paul Menard would drive with sponsorship from his father's company Menards. Menard did not finish higher than 13th and finished 31st in points. For 2010, this team became part of Richard Petty Motorsports as the team transitioned to running with Ford from Dodge.

==== Car No. 98 results ====
Year	Driver	No.	Make	1	2	3	4	5	6	7	8	9	10	11	12	13	14	15	16	17	18	19	20	21	22	23	24	25	26	27	28	29	30	31	32	33	34	35	36	Owners	Pts
2003	Jason Jarrett	98	Ford	DAY	CAR	LVS	ATL	DAR	BRI	TEX	TAL	MAR	CAL	RCH	CLT	DOV	POC	MCH	SON	DAY	CHI	NHA	POC	IND	GLN	MCH	BRI	DAR	RCH	NHA	DOV	TAL; 29	KAN	CLT	MAR	ATL	PHO	CAR	HOM	66th	76
2006	Stephen Leicht	90	Ford	DAY	CAL	LVS	ATL	BRI	MAR	TEX	PHO	TAL	RCH	DAR	CLT	DOV	POC	MCH	SON	DAY	CHI	NHA	POC; 33	IND; DNQ																68th	53
2006	Marc Goossens	90	Ford																						GLN; 43	MCH	BRI	CAL	RCH	NHA	DOV	KAN	TAL	CLT	MAR	ATL	TEX	PHO	HOM	68th	53
2009	Paul Menard	98	Ford	DAY; 38	CAL; 37	LVS; 35	ATL; 28	BRI; 25	MAR; 25	TEX; 13	PHO; 23	TAL; 13	RCH; 30	DAR; 15	CLT; 29	DOV; 32	POC; 29	MCH; 34	SON; 21	NHA; 30	DAY; 23	CHI; 35	IND; 29	POC; 26	GLN; 19	MCH; 26	BRI; 24	ATL; 15	RCH; 28	NHA; 34	DOV; 19	KAN; 30	CAL; 27	CLT; 27	MAR; 23	TAL; 42	TEX; 29	PHO; 29	HOM; 26	33rd	2979

=== Winston Cup driver history ===
- (United States) Davey Allison (1989–1993)
- (United States) Robby Gordon (1993)
- (United States) Lake Speed (1993)
- (United States) Ernie Irvan (1993–1997)
- (United States) Kenny Wallace (1994, 2007)
- (United States) Dale Jarrett (1995–2006)
- (United States) Kenny Irwin Jr. (1998–1999)
- (United States) Ricky Rudd (2000–2002, 2007)
- (United States) Elliott Sadler (2003–2006)
- (United States) Jason Jarrett (2003)
- (United States) Stephen Leicht (2006)
- (Belgium) Marc Goossens (2006)
- (United States) David Gilliland (2006–2008)
- (United States) Mike Wallace (2007)
- (United States) Travis Kvapil (2008–2009)
- (United States) Paul Menard (2009)

== Xfinity Series ==
=== Car No. 90 history ===
Multiple drivers (2005–2006)

The No. 90 car would debut in the 2005 season sponsored by Citifinancial being split by Yates' former NEXTEL Cup drivers Elliott Sadler and Dale Jarrett. The team ran a part-time schedule that season, finishing thirtieth in points, with Jarrett and Sadler posting a combined total of six top-fives. In 2006, Sadler shared the ride with development drivers Stephen Leicht and Matt McCall with Marc Goossens driving on road courses. The team remained in 30th in the standings, and McCall and Goossens were let go from the team.

Stephen Leicht (2006–2007)

Leicht was named full-time driver of the No. 90 in 2007, and picked up his first win at Kentucky Speedway. This team did not run in 2008 due to sponsorship issues and was sold to Germain Racing, where Mike Wallace drove in 2008 as the #7 Geico Toyota. The No. 90 team has not run since.

==== Car No. 90 results ====
Year	Driver	No.	Make	1	2	3	4	5	6	7	8	9	10	11	12	13	14	15	16	17	18	19	20	21	22	23	24	25	26	27	28	29	30	31	32	33	34	35	Owners	Pts
2005	Dale Jarrett	90	Ford	DAY	CAL; 10					BRI; 30				DAR; 21			DOV; 4	NSH	KEN	MLW	DAY						GLN; 39												30th	2762
2005	Elliott Sadler	90	Ford			MXC; 18	LVS; 14	ATL; 8	NSH		TEX; 5	PHO; 2	TAL		RCH; 2	CLT; 36						CHI; 33	NHA; 4	PPR	GTY	IRP		MCH; 9	BRI	CAL; 13	RCH; 6	DOV	KAN; 42	CLT; 2		TEX; 9		HOM; 18	30th	2762
2005	Stephen Leicht	90	Ford																																MEM; 13		PHO; 15		30th	2762
2006	Elliott Sadler	90	Ford	DAY; 28	CAL; 32			ATL; 30				PHO; 32		RCH; 18		CLT; 19						CHI; 38																	30th	2946
2006	Marc Goossens	90	Ford			MXC; 9																																	30th	2946
2006	Stephen Leicht	90	Ford				LVS; 18			TEX; 20			TAL; 31		DAR; 25				KEN; 10	MLW; 13	DAY; 26		NHA; 33		GTY; 38		GLN; 36	MCH; 33	BRI; 35	CAL; 33		DOV; 23	KAN; 12	CLT; 14	MEM; 19	TEX; 19	PHO; 27	HOM; 27	30th	2946
2006	Matt McCall	90	Ford						BRI; 24		NSH; 42						DOV; 41	NSH; 34						MAR; 26															30th	2946
2006	David Gilliland	90	Ford																							IRP; 29					RCH; 30								30th	2946
2007	Stephen Leicht	90	Ford	DAY; 33	CAL; 20	MXC; 27	LVS; 18	ATL; 29	BRI; 20	NSH; 8	TEX; 20	PHO; 28	TAL; 28	RCH; 24	DAR; 26	CLT; 10	DOV; 34	NSH; 33	KEN; 1	MLW; 14	NHA; 25	DAY; 27	CHI; 10	GTY; 23	IRP; 24	CGV; 5	GLN; 17	MCH; 26	BRI; 20	CAL; 29	RCH; 21	DOV; 41	KAN; 19	CLT; 18	MEM; 12	TEX; 10	PHO; 19	HOM; 5	19th	3603

=== Car No. 98 history ===
Paul Menard (2009)

In 2009, the team returned as the No. 98 Menards Ford driven by Paul Menard part-time and had four top-ten finishes with a highest finish of fifth at Texas Motor Speedway and finished twenty-fifth in points. The No. 98 was then given to Roush Fenway Racing after the 2009 NASCAR Nationwide Series season.

==== Car No. 98 results ====
Year	Driver	No.	Make	1	2	3	4	5	6	7	8	9	10	11	12	13	14	15	16	17	18	19	20	21	22	23	24	25	26	27	28	29	30	31	32	33	34	35	Owners	Pts
2002	Kasey Kahne	98	Ford	DAY	CAR; 31	LVS	DAR	BRI; 32	TEX; 36	NSH	TAL	CAL; 18	RCH; 30	NHA	NZH	CLT; 29	DOV; 20	NSH	KEN	MLW	DAY; 25	CHI; 25	GTY	PPR	IRP; 15	MCH; 10	BRI; DNQ	DAR; 18	RCH; 15	DOV; 19	KAN; 27	CLT; 32	MEM	ATL; 21	CAR; 16	PHO; 18	HOM; 21		36th	1912
2009	Paul Menard	98	Ford	DAY	CAL	LVS	BRI; 11	TEX; 5	NSH	PHO; 14	TAL	RCH	DAR; DNQ	CLT; 21	DOV; 6	NSH	KEN	MLW	NHA; 35	DAY	CHI; 14	GTY	IRP	IOW	GLN; 29	MCH; 10	BRI; 9	CGV; 15	ATL; 12	RCH; 13	DOV	KAN	CAL; 11	CLT	MEM	TEX	PHO; 30	HOM; 14	36th	1904

== Partnerships ==
The new logo of "Yates Racing" after the retirement of Robert Yates in early 2008.

=== Newman/Haas/Lanigan Racing ===
During the race weekend of the Allstate 400 at the Brickyard, Robert Yates announced a technological partnership with the Champ Car World Series team Newman/Haas/Lanigan Racing. Yates formed this partnership primarily for technology purposes and with the team's association with the Ford Motor Company, former engine supplier for the CCWS. However, with the retirement of Robert Yates at the end of the 2007 season, this partnership was canceled. The partnership got as far as Newman/Haas/Lanigan acquiring a car.

=== Hall of Fame Racing ===
On January 13, 2009, it was announced that former Joe Gibbs Racing satellite team Hall of Fame Racing would enter a technical alliance with Yates Racing. This partnership involved the switch of the #96 from Toyota to Ford, as well as the #96 being run out of Yates Racing's shop. It was also announced that Bobby Labonte would drive the car with sponsorship from search engine Ask.com, inheriting the owners points of Yates Racing's defunct #38 car. The partnership dissolved after the season due to Yates' restructuring, by which point Labonte had been replaced with Roush Fenway Racing developmental driver Erik Darnell.

=== Front Row Motorsports with Yates Racing ===
In January 2010 Front Row Motorsports and owner Bob Jenkins formed a partnership with Doug Yates to help him field Fords for the 2010 season. Doug Yates also took owner points that were earned in 2009 from cars #96 and #98 and transferred them to Front Row Motorsports cars #37 and #38.
