= 2007 Toyota/Save Mart 350 =

Race details
- Race 16 of 36 in the 2007 NASCAR Nextel Cup Series
- Track as used by NASCAR
- Date: June 24, 2007
- Official name: Toyota/Save Mart 350
- Location: Infineon Raceway, Sonoma, California
- Course: Permanent racing facility
- Course length: 1.99 miles (3.202 km)
- Distance: 110 laps, 218.9 mi (352.285 km)
- Weather: Warm with temperatures approaching 84 °F (29 °C); wind speeds up to 17.1 miles per hour (27.5 km/h)
- Average speed: 74.547 miles per hour (119.972 km/h)

Pole position
Driver	Jamie McMurray	Roush Fenway Racing
- Time: 77.521

Most laps led
Driver	Robby Gordon	Robby Gordon Motorsports
- Laps: 48

Winner
No. 42	Juan Pablo Montoya	Chip Ganassi Racing

Television in the United States
- Network: Turner Network Television
- Announcers: Bill Weber, Kyle Petty, Wally Dallenbach Jr.
- Nielsen ratings: 4.7 (Final); 4.0 (Overnight); (6.5 million)

Radio in the United States
- Radio: Performance Racing Network

The 2007 Toyota/Save Mart 350 was the sixteenth stock car race of the 2007 NASCAR Nextel Cup Series and the first of the season's two road course events. It was held on June 24, 2007, at Infineon Raceway in Sonoma, California before a crowd of 102,000. The 110-lap race was won by Juan Pablo Montoya of the Chip Ganassi Racing team who started from thirty-second position. Kevin Harvick finished second and his Richard Childress Racing teammate Jeff Burton came in third.

Although Jamie McMurray won the pole position, he was passed by Robby Gordon on the first lap. Gordon held the position until the first round of green-flag pit stops, and Carl Edwards took over the first position. He held it for twelve laps until Gordon got ahead of Edwards. At the race's final restart on lap 70, Tony Stewart took over the lead when he passed Gordon, but ceded it to McMurray after Stewart made a pit stop. McMurray slowed on lap 97 as he attempted to conserve fuel which allowed Montoya to close the gap. Montoya got ahead of McMurray for the lead after a seven-lap battle and held it to win the race. There were seven cautions and eleven lead changes by eight drivers.

It was Montoya's first win in the Nextel Cup Series, and became the first foreign driver since Earl Ross in 1974 to win in the series. After the race Jeff Gordon's lead in the Drivers' Championship was reduced because he, along with his teammate Jimmie Johnson, were penalized for a car infringement. Chevrolet maintained its lead in the Manufacturers' Championship, 49 points ahead of their nearest rival Ford with twenty races remaining in the season. The race attracted 6.5 million television viewers.

== Background ==
Infineon Raceway, where the race was held.

The 2007 Toyota/Save Mart 350 was the sixteenth of thirty-six scheduled stock car races of the 2007 NASCAR Nextel Cup Series. It took place on June 24, 2007, in Sonoma, California, at Infineon Raceway, one of two road courses to hold NASCAR races, the other is Watkins Glen International. The standard road course at Infineon Raceway is a twelve-turn course that is 2.52 miles (4.06 km) long; the track was modified in 1998, adding the Chute, which bypassed turns five and six, shortening the course to 1.95 miles (3.14 km). The Chute was only used for NASCAR events such as this race, and was criticized by many drivers, who preferred the full layout. In 2001, it was replaced with a 70-degree turn, 4A, bringing the track to its current dimensions of 1.99 miles (3.20 km).

Before the race, Jeff Gordon led the Drivers' Championship with 2,392 points, with Denny Hamlin in second and Jimmie Johnson third. Matt Kenseth and Jeff Burton were fourth and fifth, and Carl Edwards, Tony Stewart, Kevin Harvick, Clint Bowyer, Martin Truex Jr., Kyle Busch and Dale Earnhardt Jr. rounded out the top twelve. Chevrolet led the Manufacturers' Championship with 129 points, 47 ahead of their nearest rival Ford in second. Dodge was third on 73 points, and Toyota was fourth on 47. Jeff Gordon was the race's defending champion.

Several teams chose to temporarily replace their regular drivers with road course ringers. Michael Waltrip Racing replaced Michael Waltrip and David Reutimann with two-time NASCAR Nextel Cup Series champion Terry Labonte and the 1993 24 Hours of Daytona winner P. J. Jones. BAM Racing chose to replace Mike Bliss (who was competing at The Milwaukee Mile) with the 2005 Trans-Am Series champion Klaus Graf, while Hall of Fame Racing replaced Tony Raines with endurance driver Ron Fellows. Former SCCA Trans-Am champion Brian Simo was selected by Front Row Motorsports to drive the No. 37 Dodge, while American Le Mans Series and Busch Series East race winner Butch Leitzinger was selected to replace Bill Davis Racing driver Jeremy Mayfield. Brandon Ash attempted to qualify in his self-owned No. 02 car, and endurance racing driver Marc Goossens was entered in the No. 91 Riley-D'Hondt Motorsports Toyota. Scott Pruett announced he would not participate for the Chip Ganassi Racing team due to a scheduling conflict; Former V8 Supercars champion Marcos Ambrose, who was scheduled to drive the No. 47 JTG Daugherty Racing car withdrew.

Rookie of the Year competitor Juan Pablo Montoya made his NASCAR début on a road course after leaving Formula One in 2006, and was considered by several drivers to be a contender to win the race despite no previous experience of driving at Infineon Raceway. Montoya said he hoped to have a chance of winning, and expected his main rival to be Jeff Gordon. After he finished with a top-ten at the previous round (the Citizen Bank 400) Jamie McMurray hoped to continue his momentum into Sonona, and move up in the Drivers' Championship standings.

== Practice and qualifying ==
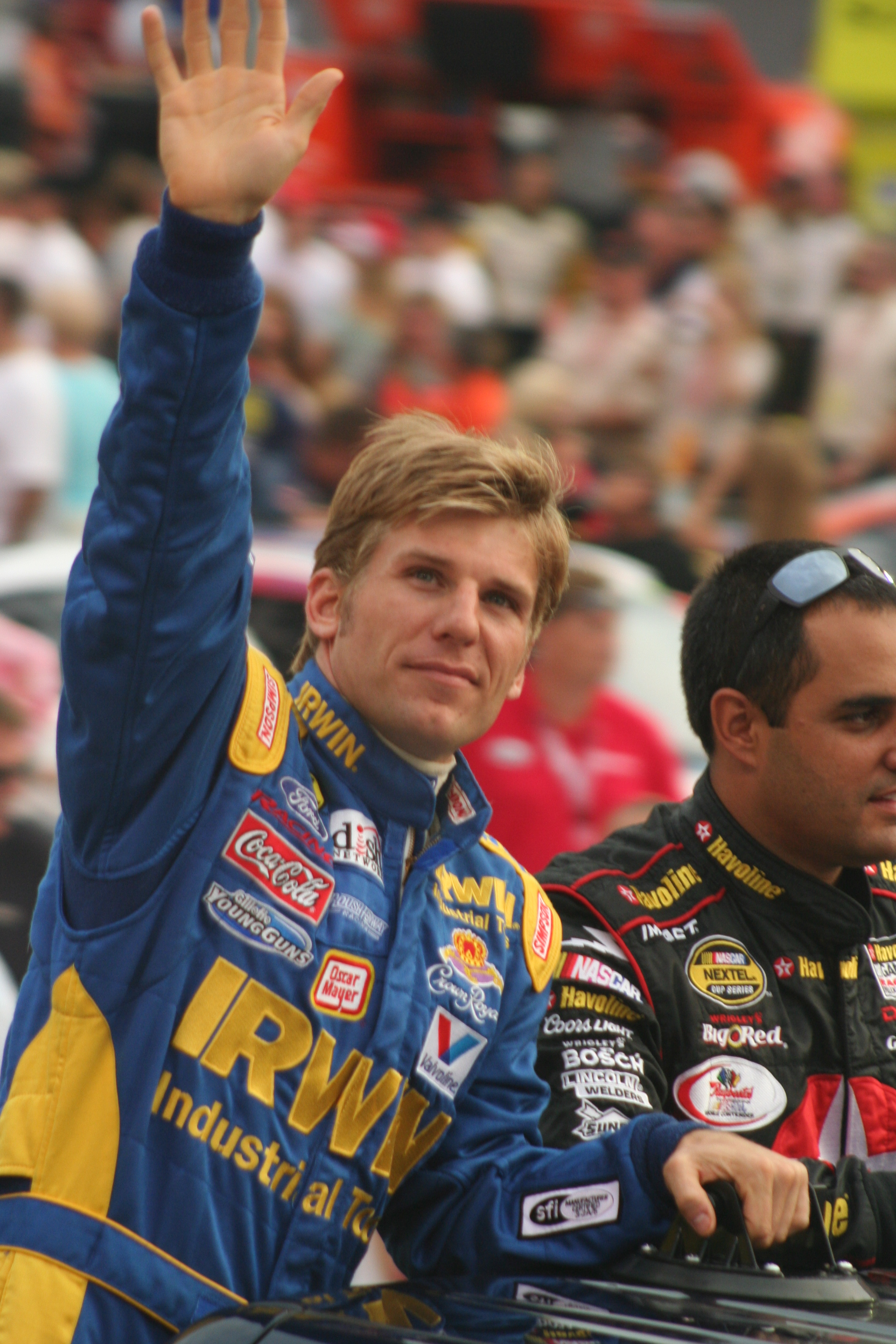
Jamie McMurray had the third pole position of his career.

Three practice sessions were held before the Sunday race: one on Friday and two on Saturday. The first session lasted 90 minutes, the second 50 minutes and the third 60 minutes. Gordon and Johnson were prohibited from competing in the first practice session and Friday's qualifier because their right-front fenders were deemed too wide by race officials during a pre-event inspection, and both drivers were required to start at the rear of the field for the race. Bobby Labonte was fastest in the first practice session with a time of 77.539 seconds; Robby Gordon was second and Kurt Busch third. Stewart took fourth position, and McMurray placed fifth. Fellows, Edwards, Ryan Newman, Harvick and Kasey Kahne rounded out the session's top-ten fastest drivers. Said, Dave Blaney and Stewart went off the track but continued.

Fifty-two drivers were entered in the qualifier on Friday evening; due to NASCAR's qualifying procedure forty-three were allowed to race. Each driver ran two laps, with the starting order determined by the competitor's fastest times. McMurray clinched the third pole position of his career, and his first since the 2005 Pennsylvania 500, with a time of 77.521 seconds. He had an advantage because he recorded his lap when weather conditions were cooler. McMurray was joined on the grid's front row by Robby Gordon and had the pole position until McMurray's lap. Earnhardt qualified third, Said fourth and Stewart started fifth. Burton, Bill Elliott, Kahne, Newman and Bowyer rounded out the top ten qualifiers. The nine drivers who failed to qualify were Ward Burton, Scott Riggs, Ash, Paul Menard, Brian Vickers, A. J. Allmendinger, Simo, Kenny Wallace and Graf. After the qualifier McMurray said that he was slightly nervous and felt another driver could record a faster lap time, "I definitely felt with Juan and Ryan going out later, I would definitely get beat. I kept telling everybody that. My heart was definitely beating faster this morning when I got up, looking forward to this."

On Saturday afternoon in cool weather conditions Montoya was fastest in the second practice session with a lap of 77.591 seconds, ahead of Harvick and Jeff Gordon. Stewart was fourth-fastest; Fellows was fifth and Kyle Busch sixth. Kahne, Elliott Sadler, Bobby Labonte and Edwards followed in the top ten. David Ragan stalled after he spun. Afterward, Edwards and Ragan left the track and flew to Milwaukee Mile to participate in the AT&T 250 Busch Series race; both drivers returned to Sonoma after the race's completion. Later that day, Hamlin paced the final practice session with a time of 78.219; Stewart was second and Robby Gordon third. Harvick was fourth-fastest, ahead of Sadler and Newman. Fellows was seventh-fastest, McMurray eighth, Johnson ninth and Jeff Gordon tenth. Hamlin was afflicted with an electrical issue which was corrected after his team installed a new distributor. J. J. Yeley damaged his car's sheet metal structure in an accident at turn ten, while Jeff Gordon spun and hit the turn eleven tire barrier and sustained minor damage. Dale Jarrett and Kyle Busch both went off track but did not damage their cars.

=== Qualifying results ===
Grid	Car	Driver	Team	Manufacturer	Time	Speed
1	26	Jamie McMurray	Roush Fenway Racing	Ford	77.521	92.414
2	7	Robby Gordon	Robby Gordon Motorsports	Ford	77.533	92.399
3	8	Dale Earnhardt Jr.	Dale Earnhardt, Inc.	Chevrolet	77.546	92.384
4	60	Boris Said	No Fear Racing	Ford	77.606	92.312
5	20	Tony Stewart	Joe Gibbs Racing	Chevrolet	77.648	92.262
6	31	Jeff Burton	Richard Childress Racing	Chevrolet	77.652	92.258
7	21	Bill Elliott	Wood Brothers Racing	Ford	77.698	92.203
8	9	Kasey Kahne	Evernham Motorsports	Dodge	77.763	92.126
9	12	Ryan Newman	Penske Racing South	Dodge	77.826	92.051
10	07	Clint Bowyer	Richard Childress Racing	Chevrolet	77.948	91.907
11	96	Ron Fellows	Hall of Fame Racing	Chevrolet	77.965	91.887
12	19	Elliott Sadler	Evernham Motorsports	Dodge	78.016	91.827
13	43	Bobby Labonte	Petty Enterprises	Dodge	78.079	91.753
14	2	Kurt Busch	Penske Racing South	Dodge	78.087	91.744
15	99	Carl Edwards	Roush Fenway Racing	Ford	78.126	91.698
16	44	Dale Jarrett	Michael Waltrip Racing	Toyota	78.172	91.644
17	16	Greg Biffle	Roush Fenway Racing	Ford	78.328	91.462
18	1	Martin Truex Jr.	Dale Earnhardt, Inc.	Chevrolet	78.391	91.388
19	22	Dave Blaney	Bill Davis Racing	Toyota	78.402	91.375
20	14	Sterling Marlin	Ginn Racing	Chevrolet	78.418	91.357
21	91	Marc Goossens	Riley-D'Hondt Motorsports	Toyota	78.455	91.313
22	29	Kevin Harvick	Richard Childress Racing	Chevrolet	78.459	91.309
23	45	Kyle Petty	Petty Enterprises	Dodge	78.497	91.265
24	5	Kyle Busch	Hendrick Motorsports	Chevrolet	78.533	91.223
25	55	Terry Labonte	Michael Waltrip Racing	Toyota	78.534	91.222
26	01	Regan Smith	Ginn Racing	Chevrolet	78.597	91.148
27	17	Matt Kenseth	Roush Fenway Racing	Ford	78.648	91.089
28	88	Ricky Rudd	Robert Yates Racing	Ford	78.657	91.079
29	41	Reed Sorenson	Chip Ganassi Racing	Dodge	78.669	91.065
30	23	Butch Leitzinger	Bill Davis Racing	Toyota	78.681	91.051
31	66	Jeff Green	Haas CNC Racing	Chevrolet	78.729	90.996
32	42	Juan Pablo Montoya	Chip Ganassi Racing	Dodge	78.746	90.976
33	18	J. J. Yeley	Joe Gibbs Racing	Chevrolet	78.812	90.900
34	70	Johnny Sauter	Haas CNC Racing	Chevrolet	78.862	90.842
35	38	David Gilliland	Robert Yates Racing	Ford	78.936	90.758
36	11	Denny Hamlin	Joe Gibbs Racing	Chevrolet	79.070	90.592
37	6	David Ragan	Roush Fenway Racing	Ford	79.713	89.872
38	25	Casey Mears	Hendrick Motorsports	Chevrolet	79.938	89.619
39	13	Joe Nemechek	Ginn Racing	Chevrolet	82.667	86.661
40	40	David Stremme	Chip Ganassi Racing	Dodge	85.137	84.147
41	24	Jeff Gordon	Hendrick Motorsports	Chevrolet	–	–
42	48	Jimmie Johnson	Hendrick Motorsports	Chevrolet	–	–
43	00	P. J. Jones	Michael Waltrip Racing	Toyota	78.813	90.899
Failed to qualify
44	4	Ward Burton	Morgan-McClure Motorsports	Chevrolet	78.887	90.813
45	10	Scott Riggs	Evernham Motorsports	Dodge	78.917	90.779
46	02	Brandon Ash	Ash Motorsports	Dodge	79.180	90.477
47	15	Paul Menard	Dale Earnhardt, Inc.	Chevrolet	79.213	90.440
48	83	Brian Vickers	Red Bull Racing Team	Toyota	79.347	90.287
49	84	A. J. Allmendinger	Red Bull Racing Team	Toyota	79.470	90.147
50	37	Brian Simo	Front Row Motorsports	Dodge	79.558	90.048
51	78	Kenny Wallace	Furniture Row Racing	Chevrolet	79.704	89.883
52	49	Klaus Graf	BAM Racing	Dodge	80.100	89.438

== Race ==
Live television coverage of the race began at 3:30 p.m. Eastern Daylight Time in the United States on TNT. Around the start of the race, weather conditions were sunny, clear, and breezy. Tina Coleman began pre-race ceremonies with an invocation. Actress and singer-songwriter Emmy Rossum performed the national anthem, and retired football wide receiver Jerry Rice along with Mike Wells of the Northern California Toyota Dealers commanded the drivers to start their engines. No drivers moved to the rear of the field.

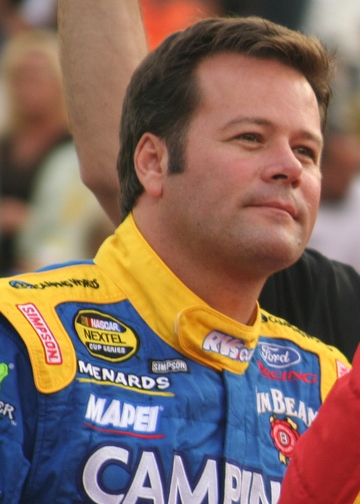
Robby Gordon led the most laps of the race (48)

The race started at 5:22 p.m. McMurray maintained his pole position advantage heading into the first corner, while Stewart fell down the field after he ran wide at the second turn but did not damage his car. Robby Gordon and Earnahrdt moved into the first and second positions, as McMurray dropped to third. The race's first caution was prompted on lap two when Goossens, Kenseth and Kyle Petty made contact in the eleventh turn; Goossens was unable to restart his car. Some drivers made pit stops for fuel and tires under caution. Kenseth and Petty had damage to their cars repaired. Robby Gordon maintained his lead at the lap-five restart, ahead of Earnhardt and McMurray. Three laps later, Earnhardt attempted to pass Robby Gordon at the esses but was unable to complete the manoeuvre. After starting from 32nd, Montoya had moved up into 20th by the 13th lap. Sterling Marlin's engine failed on lap 14, and the race's second caution was issued one lap later because he stopped in turn eight. Some drivers elected to make pit stops during the caution.

Robby Gordon remained the leader for the lap-17 restart, followed by Earnhardt and McMurray. Kyle Busch attempted to pass Montoya in turn eleven but locked his brakes and spun; he avoided contacting the wall but fell to the rear of the field. McMurray passed Earnhardt for second on the following lap. Eight laps later, a brake duct was located in turn four, which triggered the third caution. Robby Gordon led the field back up to speed at the lap-30 restart. Montoya and Johnson made contact on the 32nd lap. Green-flag pit stops began on the next lap when Earnhardt made a pit stop for tires and fuel. McMurray reclaimed the first position when Robby Gordon made his pit stop on lap 35; McMurray held it for the next lap and succeeded it to Johnson as other lead lap drivers made similar pit stops. Hamlin took over the lead when he out-braked Johnson in turn eleven on lap 37. Stewart took over the lead on the 41st lap when Hamlin made his pit stop. Fellows took over the position on the next lap, before the fourth caution was displayed on lap 44 when a large piece of metal was located at the start-finish line.

Fellows chose to pit under caution, and Edwards led the field at the lap-46 restart; he was followed by Kyle Busch, Reed Sorenson, Jones and David Stremme. On lap 49, Kahne and Bobby Labonte made contact which resulted in Labonte spinning; similarly, Joe Nemechek spun at turn eleven and his rear-end hit the tire barriers, all three drivers continued. Robby Gordon moved back up into second when he passed Kyle Busch three laps later. Jarrett battled with Johnny Sauter for position on lap 53, and both drivers made contact; Jarrett spun in turn four and subsequently stalled. The incident prompted the race's fifth caution. Edwards led the field at the lap-56 restart, followed by Robby Gordon. On the same lap, Robby Gordon passed Edwards to retake the lead. The sixth caution was triggered on the next lap when Ragan spun on the chute before entering turn ten; he went through the grass, and was unable to restart his engine. Robby Gordon led the field back to racing speed on the lap-59 restart, followed by Edwards, Kyle Busch, McMurray and Said. McMurray moved up into second position by lap 62 after he passed Kyle Busch and Edwards.

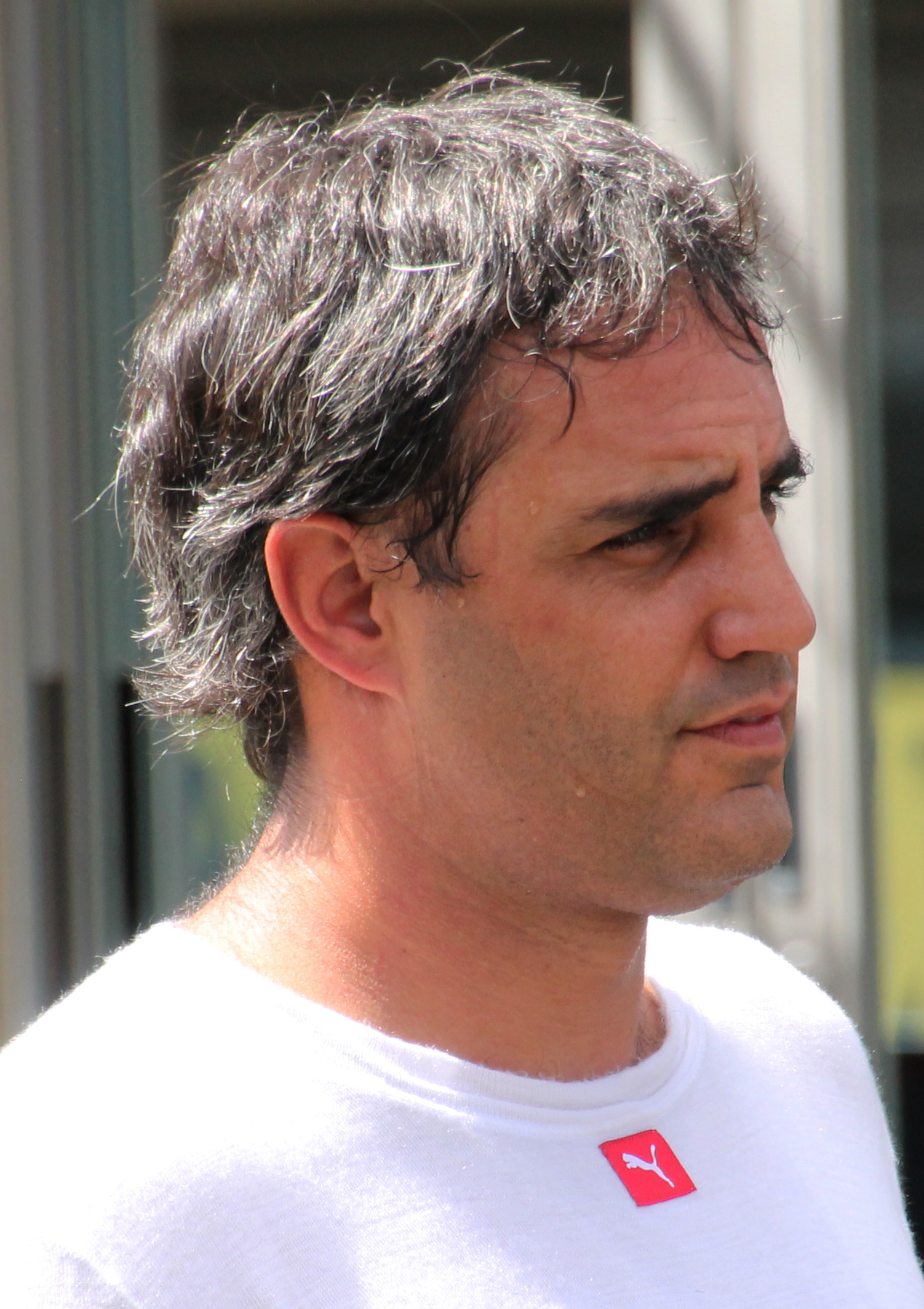
Juan Pablo Montoya (pictured in 2015) became NASCAR Nextel Cup Series' first foreign-born winner since 1974.

Leitzinger spun into the grass on lap 61, but rejoined the track. On the following lap, Kurt Busch spun sideways in turn eleven after Montoya got into his rear-end and managed to restart his engine despite falling down the order. Sorenson spun off the track, and hit the wall. He continued but spun a second time in turn seven after he clipped a curb which caused the race's seventh (and final) caution. Several drivers chose to pit under caution. McMurray and Edwards made pit stops for fuel and tires, while Said stalled which required his pit crew to push-start his car. Jeff Green collided with teammate Sauter on pit road and damaged his right-front fender. Green was observed speeding, but his race ended after his right-front tire caught fire. Robby Gordon elected not to make a pit stop and remained the leader at the lap-70 restart. Stewart out-braked Robby Gordon to take over the lead on the same lap, while Gordon lost a further position to Earnhardt when he was passed in turn eleven. Earnhardt ceded second position when he made a scheduled pit stop for four tires and fuel two laps later. Robby Gordon made a similar stop on the 75th lap, and Stewart did the same which allowed McMurray to reclaim the lead.

Kenseth spun off into the grass on lap 75; he recovered after correcting his car and continued. Nemechek spun a second time at turn eleven but restarted his car on the following lap. By the 86th lap, McMurray led Harvick, Montoya, Kyle Busch and Burton, and the gap between the top three drivers was at 1.3 seconds five laps later. Harvick was passed by Montoya around the inside at turn eleven on lap 92. Five laps later, McMurray reported his car's engine was cutting out at several points around the track. Montoya made contact with McMurray while attempting to pass him, but McMurray held the first position. Montoya tried again on lap 102 by taking the inside line into turn eleven and momentarily moved in front of McMurray, but ran deep into the corner which allowed McMurray to retain the lead. Two laps later, Montoya passed McMurray around the inside entering turn four to take over the lead. Stewart moved ahead of Jeff Gordon but slid and made contact with Gordon on the 106th lap. Fourth-place runner Edwards ran out of fuel two laps later and drove to pit road; McMurray slowed after running low on fuel. Montoya conserved fuel for the remaining two laps to win his first career victory in the Nextel Cup Series. He became the first foreign-born driver to win in the series since Earl Ross won the 1974 Old Dominion 500, as well as the first Hispanic, and was Chip Ganassi Racing's first victory since October 2002. Harvick finished second, ahead of Richard Childress Racing teammate Jeff Burton in third, Bowyer in fourth and Greg Biffle fifth. Stewart, Jeff Gordon, Kyle Busch, Said and Hamlin rounded out the top ten finishers. The race had seven cautions and eleven lead changes by eight different drivers during the race.

=== Post-race comments ===
Montoya appeared in victory lane to celebrate his first career victory in the Nextel Cup Series in front of the crowd; earning $310,600 for the victory. He said that he was "more relieved than excited" as he was given high expectations that he would perform well in NASCAR. He also stated: "It's huge. I would say right now it's the biggest thing I've done. In open-wheel, that's what I was meant to be winning in. In stock cars, I wasn't. To get our first win in our first year is huge. We know we're a little bit behind on some of the ovals, but I think this is a big boost for everybody working in the shop." Harvick, who finished in second, felt Montoya did not have sufficient fuel to reach the race's conclusion: "I've been a big fan of Montoya's since he came over. He's a great road racer, but he wasn't the fastest. The strategy won it for him today." Third-place finisher Burton was happy with his finishing position: "Obviously we worked really hard all last year and this year on fuel mileage and it paid off for us today. It was a good run for us. We ran competitive all race long."

Jeff Gordon was happy with the way his race was run: "I thought (crew chief) Steve Letarte and everyone on our team just called this race perfectly to come from that far back to a top 10. We played the (pit) strategy the best way we possibly could and we had some cautions fall our way, which was some good fortune for us to gain some spots." Fifth-place finisher Biffle said his car felt good but felt it was difficult to overtake other drivers. Robby Gordon, who led 48 laps (the most of any driver) was disappointed by finishing in 16th position: "Not to make excuses, but we were gonna run out of fuel. It's disappointing that we had a car as fast as we had, started on the front row, and not just get beat but finish 16th." He said he hoped any problems with his fuel mileage would be resolved by the season's second road course event at Watkins Glen.

Two days after the race, Hendrick Motorsports was given penalties for Jeff Gordon's and Johnson's cars. The penalties, for actions detrimental to stock car racing, car, car parts, components and/or equipment used that did not conform to NASCAR rules, parts or car components not previously approved by NASCAR that were installed or modified to enhance aerodynamic performance, and unauthorized alterations to the car's fender, included a $100,000 fine for crew chiefs Steve Letarte and Chad Knaus who were placed on probation until December 31, 2007, and were suspended from the next six races, and the loss of 100 drivers and owners points for Rick Hendrick, Gordon and Johnson. Nextel Cup Series director John Darby said there was flaring on Johnson's and Gordon's front fenders that increased their width by one inch longer than the regulations allowed. On June 28, Hendrick Motorsports announced they would not appeal the penalties, and Johnson and Gordon later stated that they accepted the decision although they felt the penalties were harsh.

The result kept Gordon in the lead of the Drivers' Championship with 2,438 points, ahead of Hamlin in second. Kenseth and Burton moved up one positions into third and fourth, while Johnson fell to fifth position. Stewart moved in front of Edwards for sixth, while Harvick and Bowyer remained in eighth and ninth positions. Kyle Busch, Truex and Earnhardt rounded out the top twelve. Chevrolet maintained its lead in the Manufacturers' Championship 135 points; Ford remained in second with 86 points. Dodge maintained third position, and Toyota remained in fourth. The race attracted a television audience of 6.5 million people. It took two hours, fifty-six minutes, and eleven seconds to complete the event, and the margin of victory was 4.097 seconds.

=== Race results ===
Pos	Grid	Car	Driver	Team	Manufacturer	Laps run	Points
1	32	42	Juan Pablo Montoya	Chip Ganassi Racing	Dodge	110	190^{1}
2	22	29	Kevin Harvick	Richard Childress Racing	Chevrolet	110	170
3	6	31	Jeff Burton	Richard Childress Racing	Chevrolet	110	165
4	10	07	Clint Bowyer	Richard Childress Racing	Chevrolet	110	160
5	17	16	Greg Biffle	Roush Fenway Racing	Ford	110	155
6	5	20	Tony Stewart	Joe Gibbs Racing	Chevrolet	110	155^{1}
7	41	24	Jeff Gordon	Hendrick Motorsports	Chevrolet	110	46^{3}
8	24	5	Kyle Busch	Hendrick Motorsports	Chevrolet	110	142
9	4	60	Boris Said	No Fear Racing	Ford	110	138
10	36	11	Denny Hamlin	Joe Gibbs Racing	Chevrolet	110	139^{1}
11	28	88	Ricky Rudd	Robert Yates Racing	Ford	110	130
12	43	00	P. J. Jones	Michael Waltrip Racing	Toyota	110	127
13	3	8	Dale Earnhardt Jr.	Dale Earnhardt, Inc.	Chevrolet	110	124
14	12	19	Elliott Sadler	Evernham Motorsports	Dodge	110	121
15	11	96	Ron Fellows	Hall of Fame Racing	Chevrolet	110	123
16	2	7	Robby Gordon	Robby Gordon Motorsports	Ford	110	125^{2}
17	42	48	Jimmie Johnson	Hendrick Motorsports	Chevrolet	110	17^{1}^{3}
18	15	99	Carl Edwards	Roush Fenway Racing	Ford	110	114^{1}
19	7	21	Bill Elliott	Wood Brothers Racing	Ford	110	106
20	9	12	Ryan Newman	Penske Racing South	Dodge	110	103
21	33	18	J. J. Yeley	Joe Gibbs Racing	Chevrolet	110	100
22	14	2	Kurt Busch	Penske Racing South	Dodge	110	97
23	8	9	Kasey Kahne	Evernham Motorsports	Dodge	110	94
24	18	1	Martin Truex Jr.	Dale Earnhardt, Inc.	Chevrolet	110	91
25	35	38	David Gilliland	Robert Yates Racing	Ford	110	88
26	16	44	Dale Jarrett	Michael Waltrip Racing	Toyota	110	85
27	38	25	Casey Mears	Hendrick Motorsports	Chevrolet	110	82
28	30	23	Butch Leitzinger	Bill Davis Racing	Toyota	110	79
29	37	6	David Ragan	Roush Fenway Racing	Ford	110	76
30	26	01	Regan Smith	Ginn Racing	Chevrolet	110	73
31	34	70	Johnny Sauter	Haas CNC Racing	Chevrolet	110	70
32	40	40	David Stemme	Chip Ganassi Racing	Dodge	110	67
33	13	43	Bobby Labonte	Petty Enterprises	Dodge	109	64
34	27	17	Matt Kenseth	Roush Fenway Racing	Ford	109	61
35	25	55	Terry Labonte	Michael Waltrip Racing	Toyota	109	58
36	21	91	Marc Goossens	Riley-D'Hondt Motorsports	Toyota	109	55
37	1	26	Jamie McMurray	Roush Fenway Racing	Ford	109	52^{1}
38	39	13	Joe Nemechek	Ginn Racing	Chevrolet	109	49
39	23	45	Kyle Petty	Petty Enterprises	Dodge	108	46
40	29	41	Reed Sorenson	Chip Ganassi Racing	Dodge	105	43
41	19	22	Dave Blaney	Bill Davis Racing	Toyota	97	40
42	31	66	Jeff Green	Haas CNC Racing	Chevrolet	68	37
43	20	14	Sterling Marlin	Ginn Racing	Chevrolet	12	34
^{1} Includes five bonus points for leading a lap
^{2} Includes ten bonus points for leading the most laps
^{3} Includes a 100-point penalty for a car infringement

== Standings after the race ==
Drivers' Championship standings

Pos	–/+	Driver	Points
1		Jeff Gordon	2,438
2		Jimmie Johnson	2,267 (−171)
3	1	Matt Kenseth	2,105 (−333)
4	1	Jeff Burton	2,084 (−354)
5	2	Denny Hamlin	2,072 (−366)
6	1	Tony Stewart	2,058 (−380)
7	1	Carl Edwards	2,019 (−419)
8		Kevin Karvick	1,964 (−474)
9		Clint Bowyer	1,934 (−504)
10	1	Kyle Busch	1,905 (−533)
11	1	Martin Truex Jr.	1,863 (−575)
12		Dale Earnhardt Jr.	1,815 (−623)

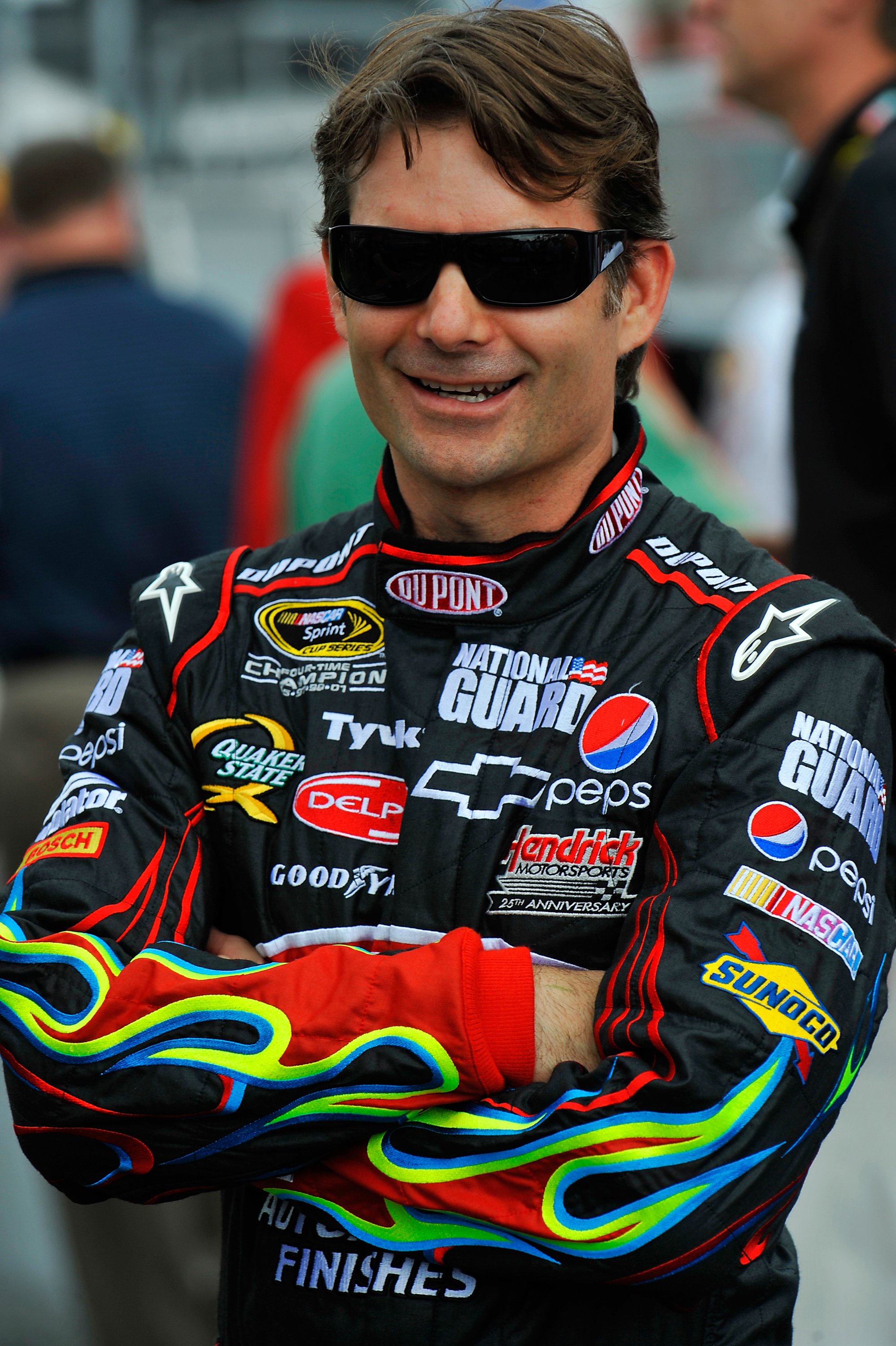
Jeff Gordon (pictured in 2009) remained the points leader after the race.

Manufacturers' Championship standings

Pos	+/–	Manufacturer	Points
1		Chevrolet	135
2		Ford	86 (−49)
3		Dodge	82 (−53)
4		Toyota	50 (−75)

- Note: Only the top twelve positions are included for the driver standings.

Previous race: 2007 Citizens Bank 400	Nextel Cup Series; 2007 season	Next race: 2007 Lenox Industrial Tools 300
