= 2007 Citizens Bank 400 =

Race details
- Race 15 of 36 in the 2007 NASCAR Nextel Cup Series season
- 2007 Citizens Bank 400 program cover
- Date: June 17, 2007
- Official name: Citizens Bank 400
- Location: Michigan International Speedway, Brooklyn, Michigan
- Course: Permanent racing facility
- Course length: 2.0 miles (3.218 km)
- Distance: 200 laps, 400 mi (643.737 km)
- Weather: Hot with temperatures reaching up to 86 °F (30 °C); wind speeds up to 7 miles per hour (11 km/h)
- Average speed: 148.07 miles per hour (238.30 km/h)

Pole position
Driver	J. J. Yeley	Joe Gibbs Racing
- Time: 38.399

Most laps led
Driver	Carl Edwards	Roush Fenway Racing
- Laps: 63

Winner
No. 99	Carl Edwards	Roush Fenway Racing

Television in the United States
- Network: TNT
- Announcers: Bill Weber, Kyle Petty and Wally Dallenbach Jr.

The 2007 Citizens Bank 400 was the 15th race of the 2007 NASCAR Nextel Cup Series season. It was held on June 17, 2007, at Michigan International Speedway, located in the town of Brooklyn, Michigan .

After this race, 11 races remained to set the field for the Chase for the Nextel Cup.

== Qualifying ==
J. J. Yeley won his first career pole with a fast lap of 187.505 miles per hour, or 38.399 seconds. Jimmie Johnson fell short of Yeley's lap by .001 second. Ryan Newman, who had won the three previous poles, qualified fourth.

Michael Waltrip made only his third race in 15 tries. He had announced earlier that week that he was stepping aside for the following week's race, the Toyota/Save Mart 350, in favor of two-time series champion Terry Labonte.

== Race ==
Carl Edwards won the Citizens Bank 400 for his first win in the Nextel Cup Series since November 4, 2005 at Texas Motor Speedway, a span of 52 races. Edwards took the lead from Johnson on lap 166 (out of 200) and never lost it.

Martin Truex Jr. finished second; he now had a three-race span in which he finished 1st, 3rd, and 2nd. Tony Stewart rallied from the 41st starting position to finish 3rd. The remaining Top 5 drivers were Casey Mears and Dale Earnhardt Jr., who would be teammates at Hendrick Motorsports in 2008.

There were 22 lead changes among 11 drivers. The race also had four caution periods; one of them was for an accident involving seven cars, including Matt Kenseth, Brian Vickers, and Jeff Green. Michigan International Speedway has been a Ford dominated track starting in 1984, and a Mercury track before that from 1969 to 1978. It was also a track that suited a smooth driver or a driver that could change his driving tactics for Michigan International Speedway.

=== Results ===
POS	ST	#	DRIVER	OWNER	CAR	LAPS	MONEY	STATUS	LED	PTS
1	12	99	Carl Edwards	Jack Roush	Ford	200	177850	running	63	195
2	8	1	Martin Truex Jr.	Dale Earnhardt, Inc.	Chevrolet	200	154445	running	54	175
3	41	20	Tony Stewart	Joe Gibbs	Chevrolet	200	157586	running	2	170
4	13	25	Casey Mears	Rick Hendrick	Chevrolet	200	113325	running	1	165
5	23	8	Dale Earnhardt Jr.	Dale Earnhardt, Inc.	Chevrolet	200	128558	running	1	160
6	3	5	Kyle Busch	Rick Hendrick	Chevrolet	200	111650	running	0	150
7	19	29	Kevin Harvick	Richard Childress	Chevrolet	200	129761	running	0	146
8	35	26	Jamie McMurray	Jack Roush	Ford	200	92400	running	0	142
9	6	24	Jeff Gordon	Rick Hendrick	Chevrolet	200	124986	running	18	143
10	18	55	Michael Waltrip	Michael Waltrip	Toyota	199	99208	running	1	139
11	21	21	Bill Elliott	Wood Brothers	Ford	199	102414	running	0	130
12	38	15	Paul Menard	Dale Earnhardt, Inc.	Chevrolet	199	81825	running	1	132
13	30	7	Robby Gordon	Robby Gordon	Ford	199	81225	running	0	124
14	7	11	Denny Hamlin	Joe Gibbs	Chevrolet	199	94025	running	1	126
15	40	00	David Reutimann	Michael Waltrip	Toyota	199	92683	running	0	118
16	11	07	Clint Bowyer	Richard Childress	Chevrolet	199	86225	running	0	115
17	20	38	David Gilliland	Yates Racing	Ford	199	105039	running	0	112
18	17	22	Dave Blaney	Bill Davis	Toyota	199	100083	running	0	109
19	2	48	Jimmie Johnson	Rick Hendrick	Chevrolet	199	144961	running	56	111
20	27	14	Sterling Marlin	Bobby Ginn	Chevrolet	199	91108	running	0	103
21	34	6	David Ragan	Jack Roush	Ford	198	112550	running	0	100
22	25	88	Ricky Rudd	Yates Racing	Ford	198	106958	running	0	97
23	29	41	Reed Sorenson	Chip Ganassi	Dodge	198	94072	running	0	94
24	9	31	Jeff Burton	Richard Childress	Chevrolet	198	111966	running	0	91
25	10	2	Kurt Busch	Roger Penske	Dodge	198	109208	running	2	93
26	28	70	Johnny Sauter	Gene Haas	Chevrolet	198	75200	running	0	85
27	37	45	John Andretti	Petty Enterprises	Dodge	198	74400	running	0	82
28	1	18	J. J. Yeley	Joe Gibbs	Chevrolet	198	107958	running	0	79
29	15	01	Mark Martin	Bobby Ginn	Chevrolet	198	81950	running	0	76
30	5	13	Joe Nemechek	Bobby Ginn	Chevrolet	198	73875	running	0	73
31	43	84	A. J. Allmendinger	Dietrich Mateschitz	Toyota	197	70725	running	0	70
32	36	9	Kasey Kahne	Ray Evernham	Dodge	197	117841	running	0	67
33	22	10	Scott Riggs	James Rocco	Dodge	197	79525	running	0	64
34	31	43	Bobby Labonte	Petty Enterprises	Dodge	197	107411	running	0	61
35	39	19	Elliott Sadler	Ray Evernham	Dodge	196	88670	running	0	58
36	42	66	Jeff Green	Gene Haas	Chevrolet	196	78275	running	0	55
37	4	12	Ryan Newman	Roger Penske	Dodge	196	102300	running	0	52
38	14	16	Greg Biffle	Jack Roush	Ford	192	88490	running	0	49
39	32	96	Tony Raines	Bill Saunders	Chevrolet	184	78390	running	0	46
40	24	40	David Stremme	Chip Ganassi	Dodge	183	70050	running	0	43
41	16	83	Brian Vickers	Dietrich Mateschitz	Toyota	140	70015	running	0	40
42	26	17	Matt Kenseth	Jack Roush	Ford	78	117611	crash	0	37
43	33	42	Juan Pablo Montoya	Chip Ganassi	Dodge	67	103926	crash	0	34
Failed to qualify or withdrew
POS	NAME	NBR	OWNER	CAR						
44	Dale Jarrett	44	Michael Waltrip	Toyota						
45	Ward Burton	4	Larry McClure	Chevrolet						
46	Jeremy Mayfield	36	Bill Davis	Toyota						
47	Mike Bliss	49	Beth Ann Morgenthau	Dodge						
48	Kevin Lepage	37	Bob Jenkins	Dodge						
49	Kenny Wallace	78	Barney Visser	Chevrolet						
WD	Scott Wimmer	33	Richard Childress	Chevrolet						

== Points ==
Jeff Gordon (9th place) retained his points lead, by 247 over second place Denny Hamlin (14th). They were followed by Kenseth (42nd), Johnson (19th due to a fuel-mileage problem), and Jeff Burton (24th) in that order. Earnhardt Jr. entered the top 12 in points, the last qualifying spot for the Chase, while Mark Martin dropped out.

== Race notes ==
- Edwards, driving a Ford Fusion for Roush Fenway Racing, was only the second non-Chevrolet driver to win a race. The other was Kenseth (Auto Club 500 at California Speedway).

Previous race: 2007 Pocono 500	Nextel Cup Series; 2007 season	Next race: 2007 Toyota/Save Mart 350
