= 2007 Lenox Industrial Tools 300 =

Race details
- Race 17 of 36 in the 2007 NASCAR Nextel Cup Series season
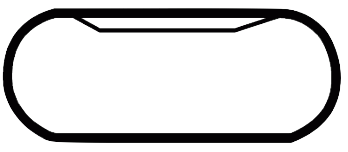
- Layout of New Hampshire Motor Speedway
- Date: July 1, 2007
- Official name: Lenox Industrial Tools 300
- Location: New Hampshire Motor Speedway, Loudon, New Hampshire
- Course: Permanent racing facility
- Course length: 1.058 miles (1.702 km)
- Distance: 300 laps, 317.4 mi (510.805 km)
- Weather: Mild with temperatures approaching 75.9 °F (24.4 °C); wind speeds up to 13 miles per hour (21 km/h)
- Average speed: 108.215 miles per hour (174.155 km/h)

Pole position
Driver	Dave Blaney	Bill Davis Racing
- Time: 29.426

Most laps led
Driver	Dale Earnhardt Jr.	Dale Earnhardt, Inc.
- Laps: 64

Winner
No. 11	Denny Hamlin	Joe Gibbs Racing

Television in the United States
- Network: TNT
- Announcers: Bill Weber, Kyle Petty and Wally Dallenbach Jr.

The 2007 Lenox Industrial Tools 300 was the 17th race of the 2007 NASCAR Nextel Cup Series season, held on July 1, 2007, at New Hampshire International Speedway in Loudon, New Hampshire.

== Summary ==
The event served as the eighth race for the new Car of Tomorrow and its first race at NHIS.

=== Qualifying ===
Dave Blaney won the pole with a speed of 129.437 mph giving him his second career pole (last pole at North Carolina Speedway in February 2003) and giving Toyota their first ever NEXTEL Cup pole position.

Shortly after the conclusion of qualifying the #83 Red Bull Toyota of Brian Vickers was found to be too low in post-qualifying inspection. Due to this his time was disallowed and he was dropped from the field. Chad Chaffin, driver of the #49 car, took his place in the starting lineup.

Others who failed to qualify: Michael Waltrip (#55), A. J. Allmendinger (#84), Kenny Wallace (#78), Scott Riggs (#10), Dale Jarrett (#44)

=== Happy Hour ===
Jimmie Johnson led Happy Hour with a speed of 127.062 mph, while Martin Truex Jr. ran the most laps, 58. Top 5 times were as follows:

Rank	Driver	Starting pos.	Speed
1	Jimmie Johnson	10th	127.062 mph
2	Juan Pablo Montoya	5th	127.062 mph
3	Jeff Gordon	8th	126.783 mph
4	Kevin Harvick	7th	126.761 mph
5	Clint Bowyer	20th	126.694 mph

== Race ==
Pole sitter Dave Blaney led the first 30 laps, the most laps he had led in a race since Atlanta in March 2001. However, he lost the lead to former New Hampshire winner Jeff Gordon. After a cycle of green-flag pit stops, Dale Earnhardt Jr. assumed the top spot and led the most laps at 64. Many pit problems arose for some teams, such as speeding penalties, or running over a hose in Ryan Newman's case, or having the jack drop off the racecar, as was witnessed by the 99 crew of Carl Edwards. However, the most significant pitstop of the day was the last one. Denny Hamlin's crew chief Mike Ford took a gamble, putting on two tires, thus giving his driver the lead. Hamlin managed to hold off a furious charge from Jeff Gordon to end his 32-race winless streak and put his team back in victory lane.

=== Results ===
Place		Driver	Make		
1	11	Denny Hamlin	Chevrolet	190/5 300	Running
2	24	Jeff Gordon	Chevrolet	175/5 300	Running
3	1	Martin Truex Jr.	Chevrolet	170/5 300	Running
4	8	Dale Earnhardt Jr.	Chevrolet	170/10 300	Running
5	48	Jimmie Johnson	Chevrolet	160/5 300	Running
6	66	Jeff Green	Chevrolet	150/0 300	Running
7	31	Jeff Burton	Chevrolet	146/0 300	Running
8	29	Kevin Harvick	Chevrolet	142/0 300	Running
9	17	Matt Kenseth	Ford	143/5 300	Running
10	12	Ryan Newman	Dodge	139/5 300	Running
11	5	Kyle Busch	Chevrolet	135/5 300	Running
12	20	Tony Stewart	Chevrolet	127/0 300	Running
13	99	Carl Edwards	Ford	129/5 300	Running
14	70	Johnny Sauter	Chevrolet	121/0 300	Running
15	6	David Ragan *	Ford	118/0 300	Running
16	26	Jamie McMurray	Ford	115/0 300	Running
17	7	Robby Gordon	Ford	112/0 300	Running
18	43	Bobby Labonte	Dodge	109/0 300	Running
19	42	Juan Montoya *	Dodge	106/0 300	Running
20	96	Tony Raines	Chevrolet	103/0 300	Running
21	2	Kurt Busch	Dodge	105/5 300	Running
22	18	J.J. Yeley	Chevrolet	97/0 300	Running
23	25	Casey Mears	Chevrolet	94/0 300	Running
24	14	Sterling Marlin	Chevrolet	91/0 300	Running
25	9	Kasey Kahne	Dodge	88/0 300	Running
26	41	Reed Sorenson	Dodge	85/0 300	Running
27	40	David Stremme	Dodge	82/0 300	Running
28	38	David Gilliland	Ford	79/0 299	Running
29	22	Dave Blaney	Toyota	81/5 299	Running
30	88	Ricky Rudd	Ford	73/0 299	Running
31	16	Greg Biffle	Ford	70/0 298	Running
32	01	Regan Smith	Chevrolet	67/0 298	Running
33	19	Elliott Sadler	Dodge	64/0 297	Running
34	21	Bill Elliott	Ford	61/0 297	Running
35	37	Kevin Lepage	Dodge	58/0 294	Running
36	49	Chad Chaffin	Dodge	55/0 293	Running
37	07	Clint Bowyer	Chevrolet	52/0 293	Running
38	00	David Reutimann *	Toyota	49/0 293	Running
39	15	Paul Menard *	Chevrolet	46/0 286	Running
40	36	Jeremy Mayfield	Toyota	43/0 259	Running
41	13	Joe Nemechek	Chevrolet	40/0 197	Out of Race
42	45	John Andretti	Dodge	37/0 109	Out of Race
43	4	Ward Burton	Chevrolet	34/0 4	Out of Race

"*" Denotes rookie

=== Race notes ===
- Hendrick Motorsports crew chiefs Steve Letarte (#24) and Chad Knaus (#48) served the first of a six-race suspensions for the Car of Tomorrow violations found at Infineon Raceway the previous week.
- Chaffin, who backed into the race when Vickers' qualifying time was wiped out, replaced Mike Bliss, who was released earlier in the week.

== Post-race penalties ==
The #70 car of Johnny Sauter and the #5 car of Kyle Busch were found too low during post-race inspection. As a result, both drivers lost 25 points in the standings, their respective owners (Haas CNC Racing and Hendrick Motorsports) lost 25 points as well, and their respective crew chiefs (Robert "Bootie" Barker and Alan Gustafson) were placed on probation until September 19.

Previous race: 2007 Toyota/Save Mart 350	Nextel Cup Series; 2007 season	Next race: 2007 Pepsi 400
