= 2007 Pocono 500 =

Race details
- Race 14 of 36 in the 2007 NASCAR Nextel Cup Series season
- Pocono Raceway, where the race was held.
- Date: June 10, 2007
- Official name: Pocono 500
- Location: Pocono Raceway, Long Pond, Pennsylvania
- Course: Permanent racing facility
- Course length: 2.5 miles (4.023 km)
- Distance: 106 laps, 265 mi (426.476 km)
- Scheduled distance: 200 laps, 500 mi (804.672 km)
- Average speed: 135.608 miles per hour (218.240 km/h)

Pole position
Driver	Ryan Newman	Penske Racing
- Time: 52.922

Most laps led
Driver	Denny Hamlin	Joe Gibbs Racing
- Laps: 49

Winner
No. 24	Jeff Gordon	Hendrick Motorsports

Television in the United States
- Network: TNT
- Announcers: Bill Weber, Kyle Petty and Wally Dallenbach Jr.

The 2007 Pocono 500, the fourteenth race of the 2007 NASCAR Nextel Cup season, was run on Sunday, June 10, 2007 at Pocono Raceway outside the town of Long Pond, Pennsylvania. The race marked the start of the second half of the race to qualify for the Chase for the Nextel Cup.

Throughout the week, drivers in the Truck, Busch, and Cup series along with the Grand National division wore small black logos reading "WCF (William Clifton France) Innovator, Pioneer, Friend 1933-2007" to pay tribute to former NASCAR president Bill France Jr.

== Qualifying ==
Ryan Newman won his third consecutive pole during qualifying. Defending race winner Denny Hamlin aspired to become the first driver since Tim Richmond to record 3 consecutive Pocono victories. Martin Truex Jr., fresh off his first NEXTEL Cup win, lined up in third. Michael Waltrip, Kenny Wallace, Kevin Lepage, Jeremy Mayfield, Dale Jarrett, and Mike Bliss failed to make the race.

== Race ==
The start of the race was halted by a nearly two-hour rain delay as the estimated green flag was set to wave at 2:20 PM. When the race finally started, it was the same routine as last year; Hamlin leading the first lap. Although it was widely expected that Hamlin would again walk away with a victory, a caution flag set up a pit cycle. While Hamlin's crew opted for four tires, everyone else took two, and Hamlin would spend the rest of the day fighting through the field. Jeff Gordon's crew chief, Steve Letarte, called his driver in earlier than the rest of the field. With another rain shower approaching Pocono, he took the chance that all the other cars would have to pit after they did, thereby giving them the lead. Letarte's intuition proved correct as the race was called after 106 laps were completed, and Jeff Gordon ended up with his third Pocono 500 win. The actual race distance was 265 miles. At 106 laps, it is the second shortest 500-mile race in US motorsport history (the 1976 Indianapolis 500 ran 255 miles).

The caution for rain was called at exactly the right moment for Gordon. Right as the caution was called, Newman was in position to pass Gordon for the win. In addition, it was discovered after the race that Gordon's car had suffered a mechanical failure and would have had to spend time in the garage had the race restarted.

== TV coverage ==
The race marked the first of six telecasts for TNT in the new NASCAR television package for 2007. Kyle Petty made his broadcasting debut at the race, replacing Benny Parsons, who died of cancer during Speedweeks.

Top ten results:

Pos.	No.	Driver	Car	Team
1.	#24	Jeff Gordon	Chevrolet	Hendrick Motorsports
2.	#12	Ryan Newman	Dodge	Penske Racing
3.	#1	Martin Truex Jr.	Chevrolet	Dale Earnhardt Inc.
4.	#25	Casey Mears	Chevrolet	Hendrick Motorsports
5.	#20	Tony Stewart	Chevrolet	Joe Gibbs Racing
6.	#11	Denny Hamlin	Chevrolet	Joe Gibbs Racing
7.	#01	Mark Martin	Chevrolet	Ginn Racing
8.	#5	Kyle Busch	Chevrolet	Hendrick Motorsports
9.	#17	Matt Kenseth	Ford	Roush Fenway Racing
10.	#07	Clint Bowyer	Chevrolet	Richard Childress Racing

== Race notes ==
- Chad McCumbee replaced Petty in the #45 car, which Petty had driven since the 2001 season. The Craftsman Truck Series regular from Supply, North Carolina finished 25th.

Previous race: 2007 Autism Speaks 400	Nextel Cup Series; 2007 season	Next race: 2007 Citizens Bank 400
