= RFK Racing in the NASCAR Cup Series =

Racing team history

Founded in 1988, the NASCAR program is built around having multiple cars and providing engine, engineering and race car build services to other NASCAR teams fielding Ford branded vehicles. The multi-team aspect of the company allows for information and resources to be shared across the enterprise, improving the performance of all of the teams. Since the 2004 season, engines for the cars have been provided by Roush-Yates Engines, a partnership between Roush Fenway Racing and now-closed rival Yates Racing, with Doug Yates as head engine builder. Roush-Yates also provides engines, cars and parts to other Cup teams, including Wood Brothers Racing, Team Penske, and Front Row Motorsports.

Between 1998 and 2000 and 2003–2009, Roush Racing operated five full-time Cup teams (6, 16, 17, 26/97, 99), more than any other organization including Hendrick Motorsports and Richard Childress Racing, which have both operated as many as four full-time teams. Beginning in 2001, after years of operating in separate facilities, the teams were moved into a single shop in Concord, North Carolina to improve performance and communication. Roush Racing set a NASCAR record by putting all five of its race teams in the Chase for the Nextel Cup in 2005. Following the 2009 season, Roush Fenway was ordered by NASCAR to shrink its operation to four Sprint Cup Series teams, ceding the No. 26 team. The team would later shrink to three teams after the 2011 season, and would shrink again to two teams after the 2016 season.

After several months of speculation, Roush-Fenway announced on 20 July 2021, at the NASCAR Hall of Fame that the 2010 Nationwide Series and 2012 Sprint Cup Series Champion Brad Keselowski would depart from Team Penske after the 2021 season to join the organization as a driver (replacing Ryan Newman in the No. 6) and co-owner.

== Cars ==
=== Car No. 06 history ===
Todd Kluever and David Ragan (2006)

The No. 06 attempted ten races led by crew chief Frank Stoddard during the 2006 season to prepare Roush Racing's development drivers for future Cup careers, and eventually replace Mark Martin in the No. 6 car. Todd Kluever originally served as the sole driver, but was replaced with David Ragan at the end of the season. The team debuted with Kluever behind the wheel at Chicagoland on July 9 with a sponsorship from 3M. Kluever also drove the car at Michigan, Kansas, Charlotte, and attempted to start races at Fontana, Phoenix, and Homestead. David Ragan, with a sponsorship from Sharp Aquos, ran the No. 06 at Dover and Martinsville in the fall, and missed the second 2006 race at Texas and also being forced to withdrawal from the second 2006 race at Atlanta. Kluever and Ragan combined 10 races and made six with the best finish being by Ragan at Martinsville with a 25th-place run. They posted zero wins, zero Top 5's, zero Top 10's, an average finish of 37th, four DNQ's (including one withdrawal), and three DNF's.

==== Car No. 06 results ====
Year	Driver	No.	Make	1	2	3	4	5	6	7	8	9	10	11	12	13	14	15	16	17	18	19	20	21	22	23	24	25	26	27	28	29	30	31	32	33	34	35	36	Owners	Pts
2006	Todd Kluever	06	Ford	DAY	CAL	LVS	ATL	BRI	MAR	TEX	PHO	TAL	RCH	DAR	CLT	DOV	POC	MCH	SON	DAY	CHI; 41	NHA	POC	IND	GLN	MCH; 43	BRI	CAL; DNQ	RCH	NHA		KAN; 32	TAL	CLT; 39				PHO; DNQ	HOM; DNQ	55th	334
2006	David Ragan	06	Ford																												DOV; 42				MAR; 25	ATL; Wth	TEX			55th	334

=== Car No. 6 history ===
Mark Martin (1988–2006)

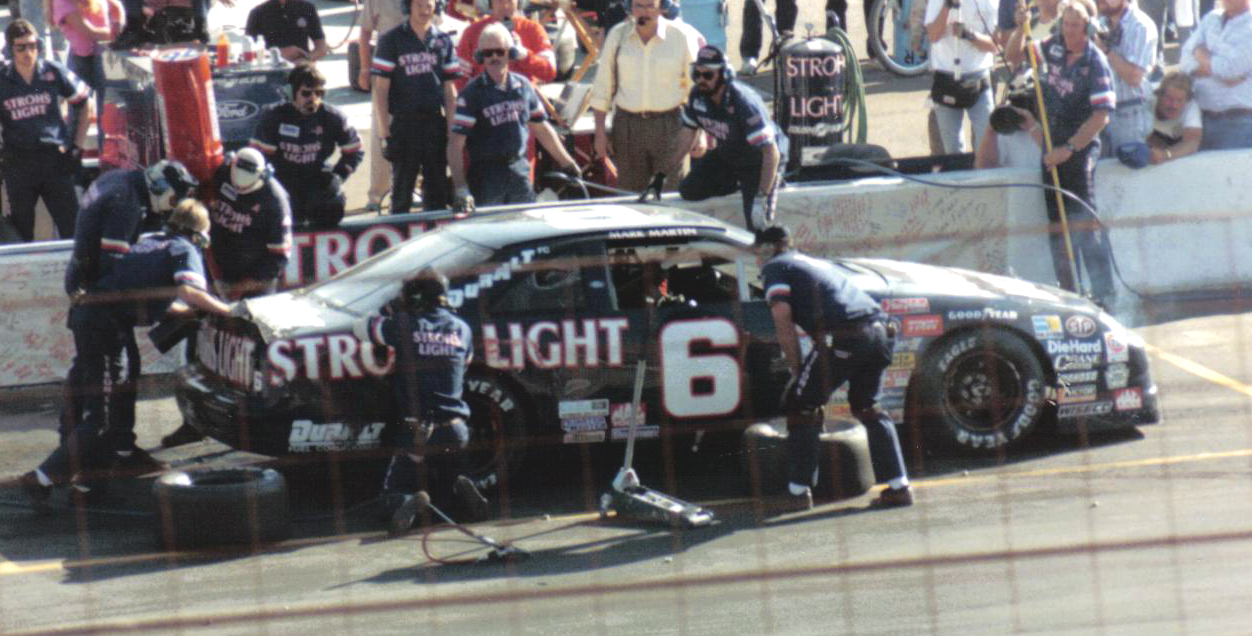
Mark Martin in 1989.

The 6 car began as Roush Racing's original foray into NASCAR, debuting in the 1988 Daytona 500 as the No. 6 Stroh's Light-sponsored Ford. With then-short-track-driver Mark Martin at the wheel and future NASCAR vice president Robin Pemberton as crew chief, the team finished 41st after experiencing an engine failure after 19 laps. However, performance quickly improved, with Martin winning a pole position later in the season and achieving ten top ten finishes. With a year of experience under their belt, Roush and Martin went on a tear in 1989, winning six poles, earning eighteen top ten finishes and winning for the first time at Rockingham. The team finished third place in championship points.

Garnering new sponsorship from Folgers in 1990, Martin won three each of races and pole positions, as well as finishing in the top tens in all but six races. Martin held the points lead for a majority of the season, but lost momentum in the final races. In the end, the team lost the championship to Dale Earnhardt by 26 points. Martin would have won the championship had he not been docked 46 points in the second race of the season following a rules violation. Regardless, the team hoped to carry the momentum into 1991. Disappointingly, Martin finished sixth in points, and did not win until the season finale at Atlanta.

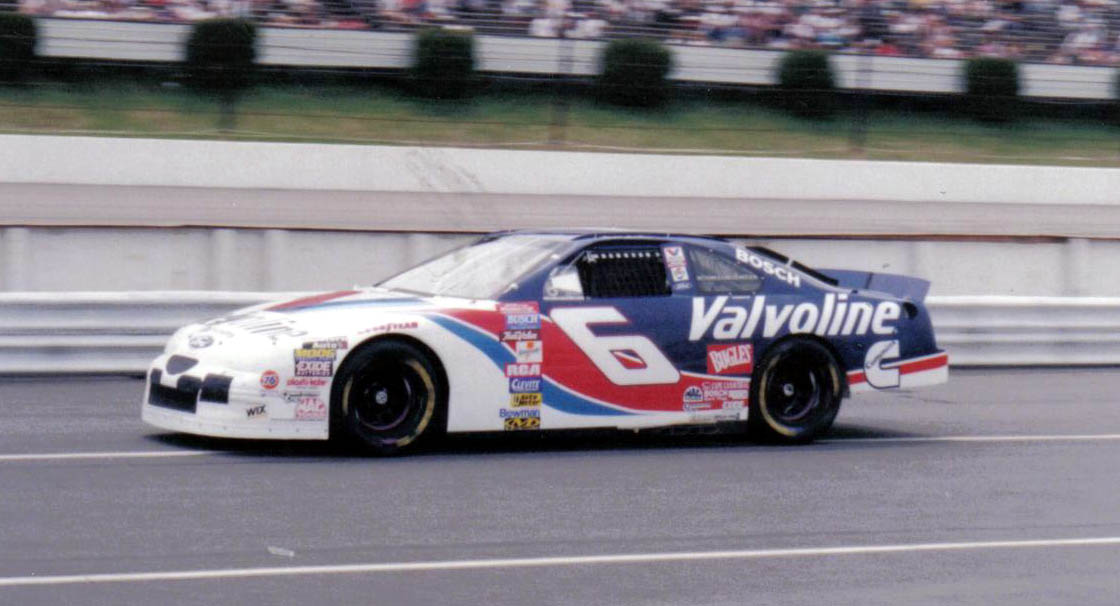
The No. 6 paint scheme from 1996 to 1997.

In 1992, Valvoline joined to sponsor the car, but the team's position in points still did not improve. Finally, they recaptured the magic of before in 1993, as Martin notched five victories and finished third in points. 1994 found Martin and the No. 6 team finishing runner-up to Earnhardt in points once again. In 1995, Martin defeated former teammate Wally Dallenbach Jr. to win at Watkins Glen and won the most money of his career at that time: $1,893,519. However, the team's performance slumped sharply in 1996, as Martin finished the season winless. He would win again in 1997, with an additional four victories and finishing third in championship points. In 1998, Martin and the No. 6 team had their most dominant season yet, winning seven times, but finished second in points yet again, this time to Jeff Gordon. The 1998 season was marked with a black spot when Martin's father Julian died in an aviation accident. Although 1999 saw Martin winning only twice, he finished in the top ten in 26 out of 34 races.

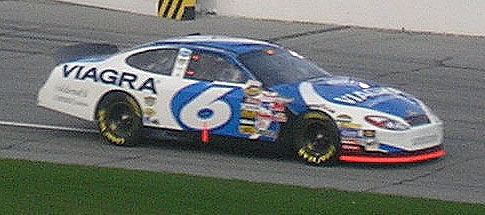
2005 No. 6 Viagra Ford Taurus

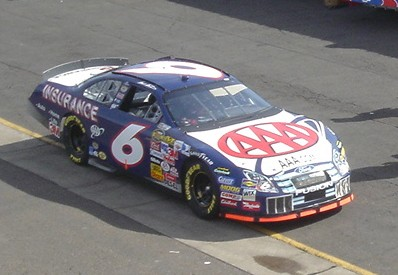
Martin in his final season for Roush in 2006.

After winning only one race in 2000, primary sponsor Valvoline left for MB2 Motorsports, and Pfizer and Viagra became the team's new financial backers. In addition, throughout the season Martin served as co-owner/mentor of rookie driver Matt Kenseth. However, Martin failed to win again, and ended up 12th in points; this was his lowest finish since 1988. The team won only one race in 2002 but was narrowly defeated by Tony Stewart for the championship. 2003 was another season of lackluster performance for the team with no wins and a 17th-place finish in the final standings. 2004 brought improved performance, with a win at Dover and a fourth-place finish in points. Prior to the next season, Martin stated that 2005 would be his last year in full-time Cup competition. The team conducted a "Salute to You" farewell tour to his fans highlighting many of Martin's career accomplishments. Martin finished fourth in points and went to victory lane once, along with achieving 19 top ten finishes. Due to contract issues, Roush was left without a driver for car No. 6 in 2006. After learning of the situation, Martin announced his return to car No. 6 for one more year. The team extended the "Salute to You" tour after modifying its paint schemes to reflect the team's new sponsor, AAA. Martin went winless, but had seven top fives and 15 top tens en route to a ninth-place points finish in his final year for Roush. He moved to Ginn Racing and Dale Earnhardt, Inc. part-time for 2007 and 2008, then did run several more full seasons for Hendrick Motorsports and two partial seasons with Michael Waltrip Racing, Joe Gibbs Racing, and Stewart–Haas Racing, retiring for good after 2013. Martin earned 35 of his 40 career wins in Roush's number 6.

David Ragan (2007–2011)

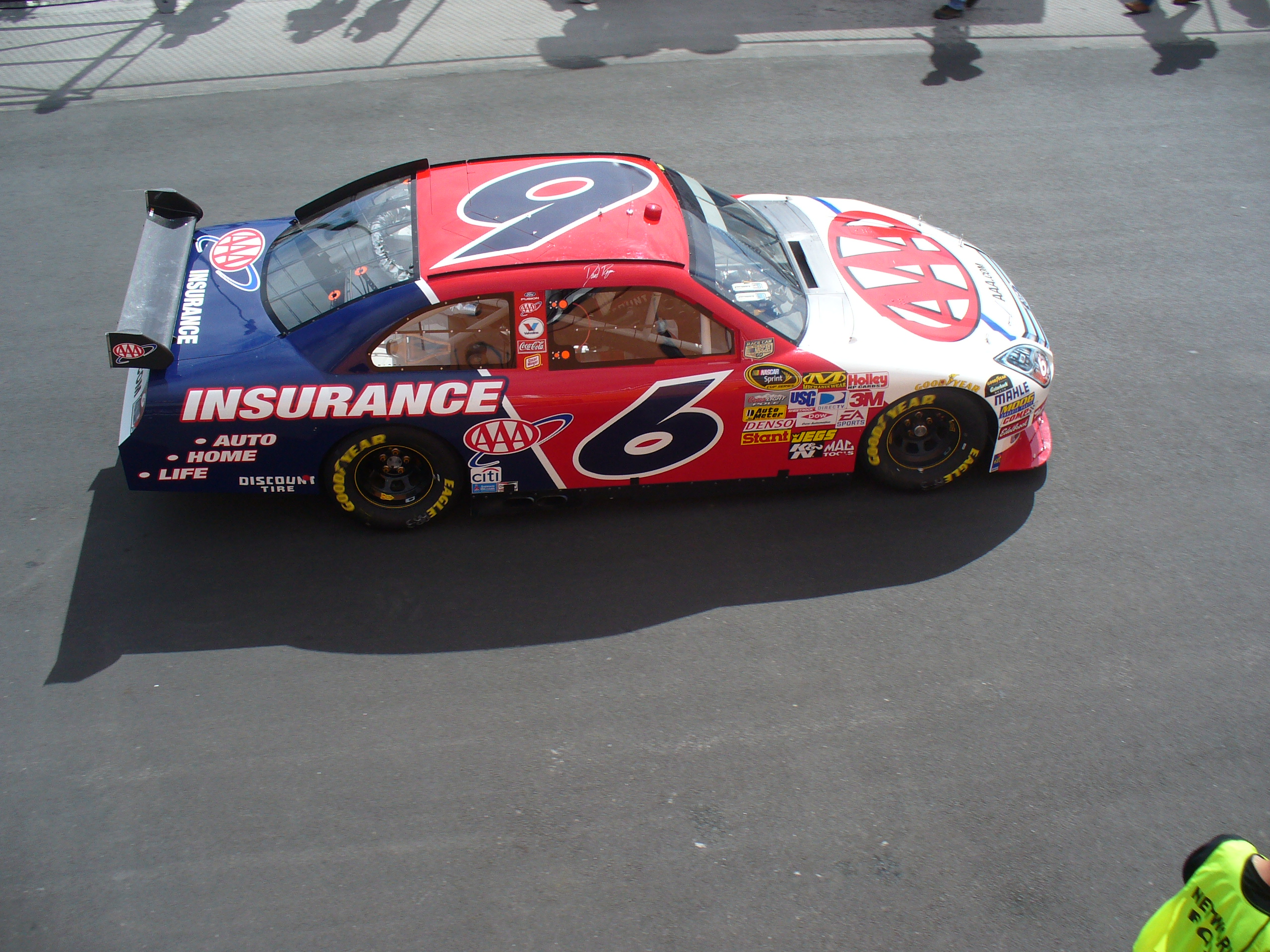
David Ragan in the No. 6 at Las Vegas in 2008.

Todd Kluever was originally scheduled to drive the No. 6 car in 2007, running several races in the No. 06 Cup car in anticipation, but due to lackluster performance in the Busch Series, Roush Racing decided to put Truck Series driver David Ragan in the car full-time. In his rookie season, Ragan had three top-tens and finished 23rd in points, but with numerous crashes. The following season, Ragan's performance dramatically improved. He had fourteen top-ten finishes and competed for a spot in the Chase for the Cup, before finishing 13th in the points standings.

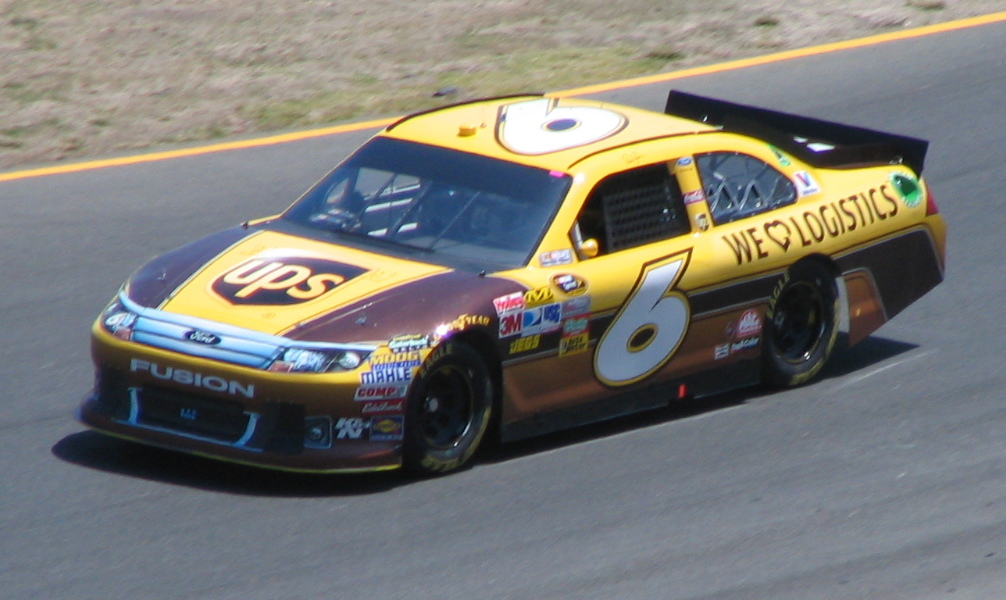
David Ragan in the No. 6 during the 2011 Toyota/Save Mart 350.

AAA left the No. 6 team after the 2008 season for Penske Racing, with UPS taking over sponsorship for Ragan's car for 2009. Ragan only had two top-ten finishes and finished 27th. The next year, the team started off on a mixed note by nearly winning the 2011 Daytona 500, only to be penalized for an early lane change. The team then won at Daytona in July, their first since 2005. Despite the victory, UPS left the No. 6 team and moved to an associate sponsor for the No. 99 team. Jack Roush announced that RFR would not field the No. 6 team in 2012, forcing the team to reassign or lay off nearly 100 employees. Ragan moved to Front Row Motorsports' No. 34 car, and crew chief Drew Blickensderfer moved to Richard Childress Racing.

Ricky Stenhouse Jr. (2012)

After being RFR's flagship since 1988, the team became a part-time R&D team in 2012. Ricky Stenhouse Jr. drove at the 2012 Daytona 500 with crew chief Chad Norris, qualifying 8th in time trials. He started 20th in the race and finished 21st. Without sponsorship, the team planned to close down after the Daytona 500, with Jack Roush selling the team's top-35 owner points to former RFR crew chief Frank Stoddard and his FAS Lane Racing team. However, Stenhouse did race in the No. 6 car in three more races at Dover, Charlotte and Homestead in the fall.

2013–2014 hiatus and Trevor Bayne (2014–2018)

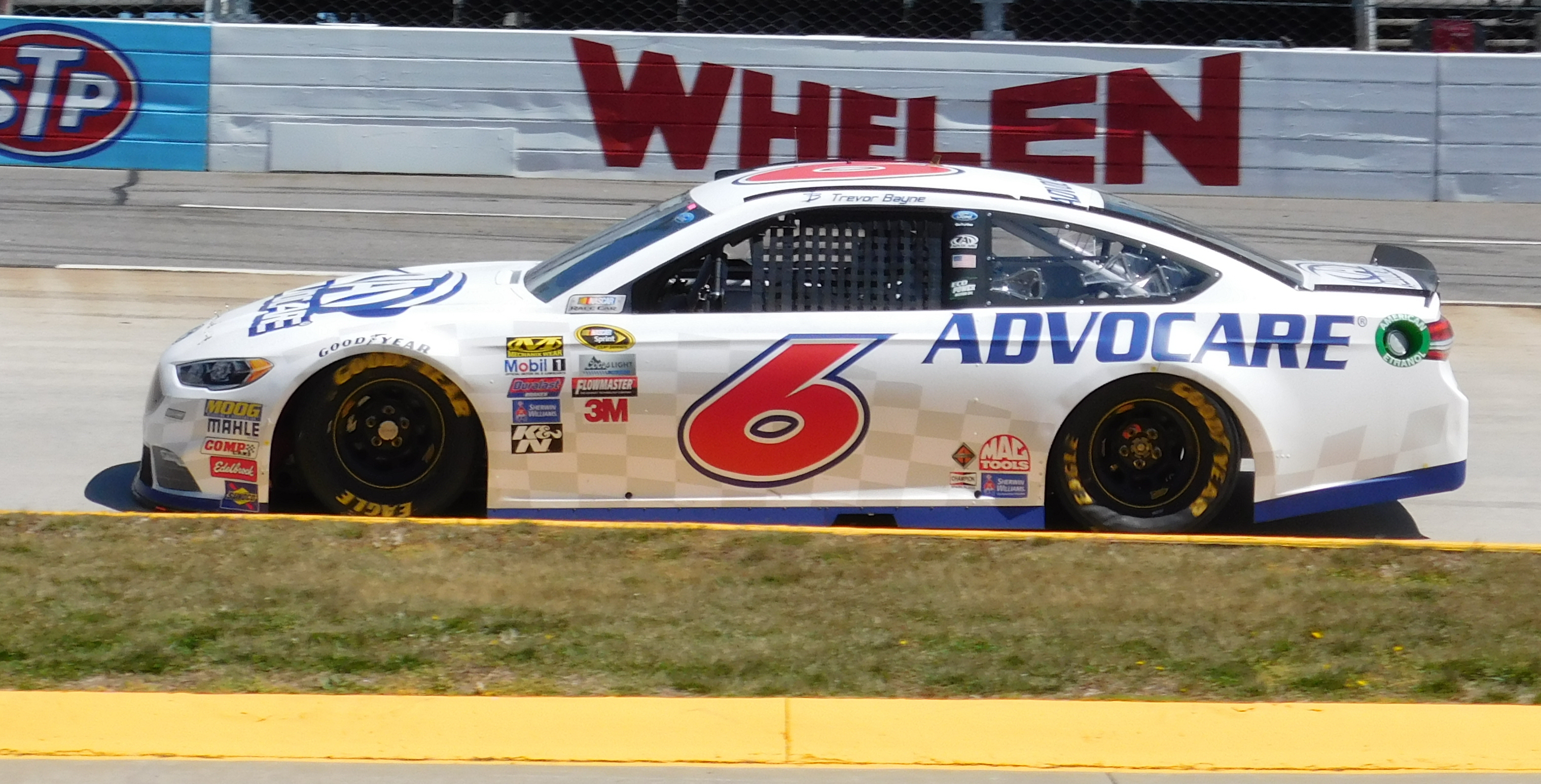
Trevor Bayne in the No. 6 at Martinsville in 2016.

The No. 6 car did not run in 2013. In the fall of 2014, it was announced that 2011 Daytona 500 winner Trevor Bayne would drive the car full-time in 2015, with Xfinity Series sponsor AdvoCare covering the full season. In preparation, Bayne attempted the 2014 Bank of America 500 at Charlotte in the No. 6 car (in addition to his part-time ride with Wood Brothers Racing), but posted the 38th fastest time and failed to qualify, RFR's first DNQ since 2006.

After a very weak start for Roush's standards, Bayne recorded his first top-10 of the year in June at the rain shortened race at Michigan. He recorded another top ten at Daytona in July after being in contention for the win at the end of the race. The No. 6 would struggle for most of the season, ending 29th in owner points. In 2016, Bayne garnered five top tens and two top fives en route to a 22nd-place points finish.

2017 was mostly the same for Bayne, as he again finished 22nd in points. The team tried to pick up a tire strategy win at Indianapolis but a caution came out erasing Bayne's lead and Bayne ended up being part of one of the many crashes that took place in the final laps.

Trevor Bayne & Matt Kenseth (2018)

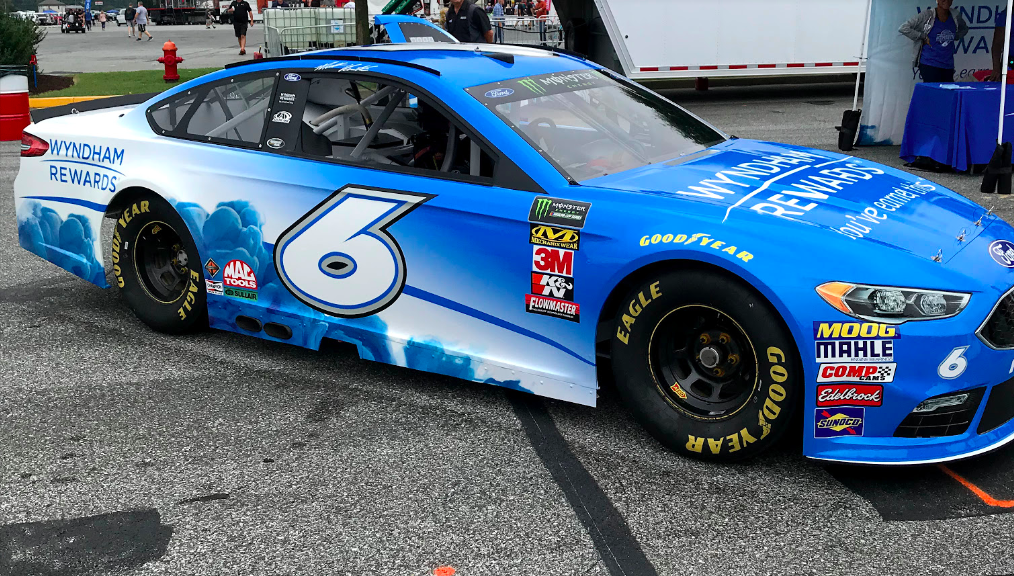
Kenseth's showcar at Dover in 2018

On April 25, 2018, Roush Fenway Racing announced that Matt Kenseth will return to the team and share the No. 6 with Bayne on a part-time basis, with Wyndham Rewards as his primary sponsor. He made his return at the 2018 KC Masterpiece 400 in Kansas and participated in the 2018 Monster Energy NASCAR All-Star Race in Charlotte. On September 12, 2018, Roush Fenway Racing announced that Bayne will not return to the team in the 2019 season. Bayne's final race with RFR was at the 2018 AAA Texas 500 with a 21st-place finish. A week later, Kenseth scored the No. 6's highest finish of the season with seventh place at the 2018 Can-Am 500. This was bested by a sixth-place finish in Kenseth's final race for the team at the season-ending 2018 Ford EcoBoost 400.

Ryan Newman (2019–2021) & Ross Chastain (2020)

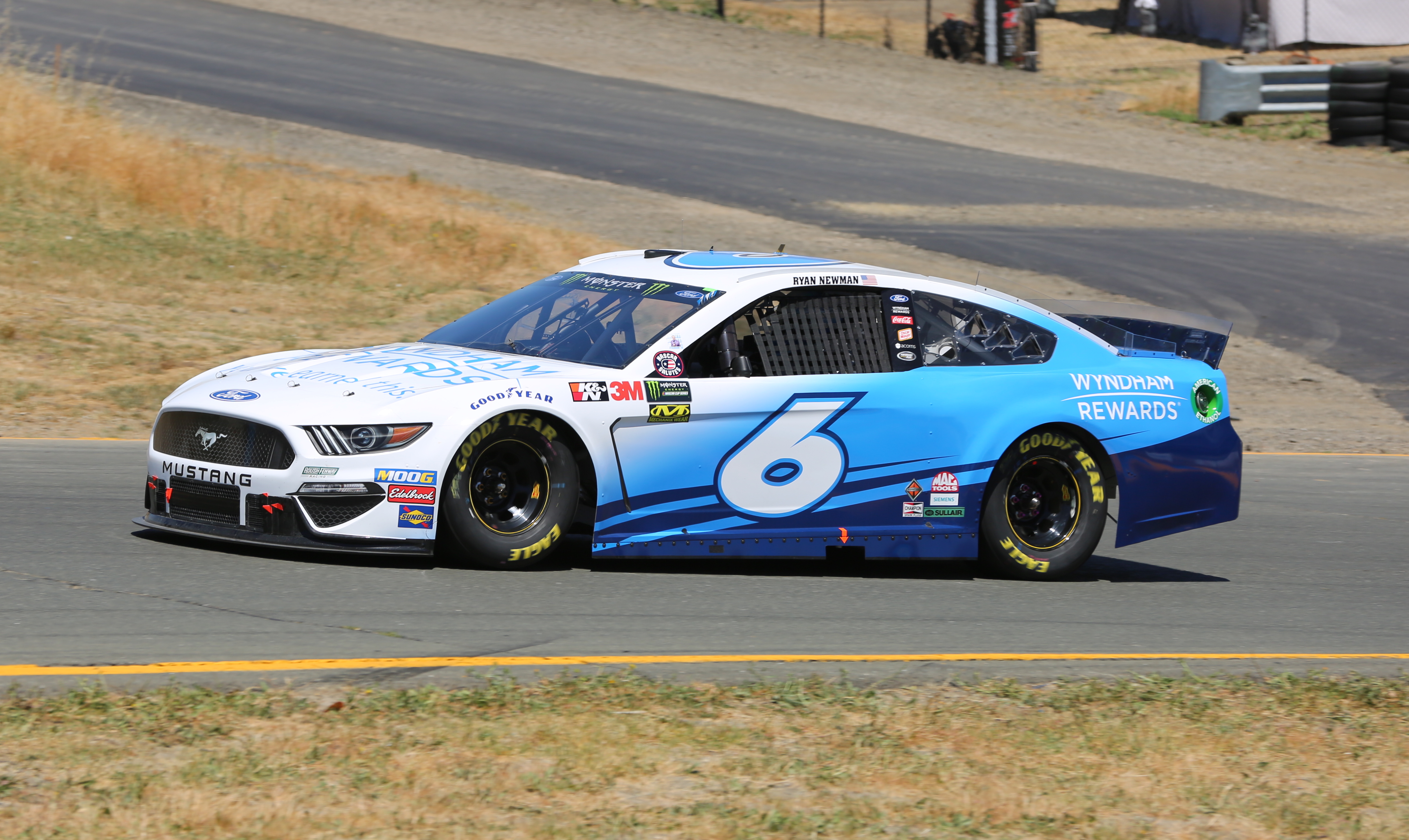
Ryan Newman in the No. 6 at Sonoma in 2019.

On September 21, it was reported that Ryan Newman will take over the No. 6 car. On October 23, 2018, Roush Fenway Racing announced that Scott Graves will become Newman's crew chief. On January 10, 2019, it was announced that Oscar Mayer, which previously sponsored Kenseth and Kurt Busch during the 2000s, will be the main sponsor of the No. 6 car. Newman started off the 2020 season with a wreck in the final lap in the 2020 Daytona 500 in February when he was about to win, but he did get spun in the last corner by Ryan Blaney in the no. 12. However, his car flipped over, over the finish line, and he was injured and hospitalized, but not life-threatening, and he was released on Wednesday night. Ross Chastain announced that he will replace Newman starting in Las Vegas for the running of 2020 Pennzoil 400. On April 27, 2020, it was announced that Newman was medically cleared to return to competition. In addition, NASCAR granted him a waiver for eligibility in the 2020 playoffs.

Brad Keselowski (2022–2026)

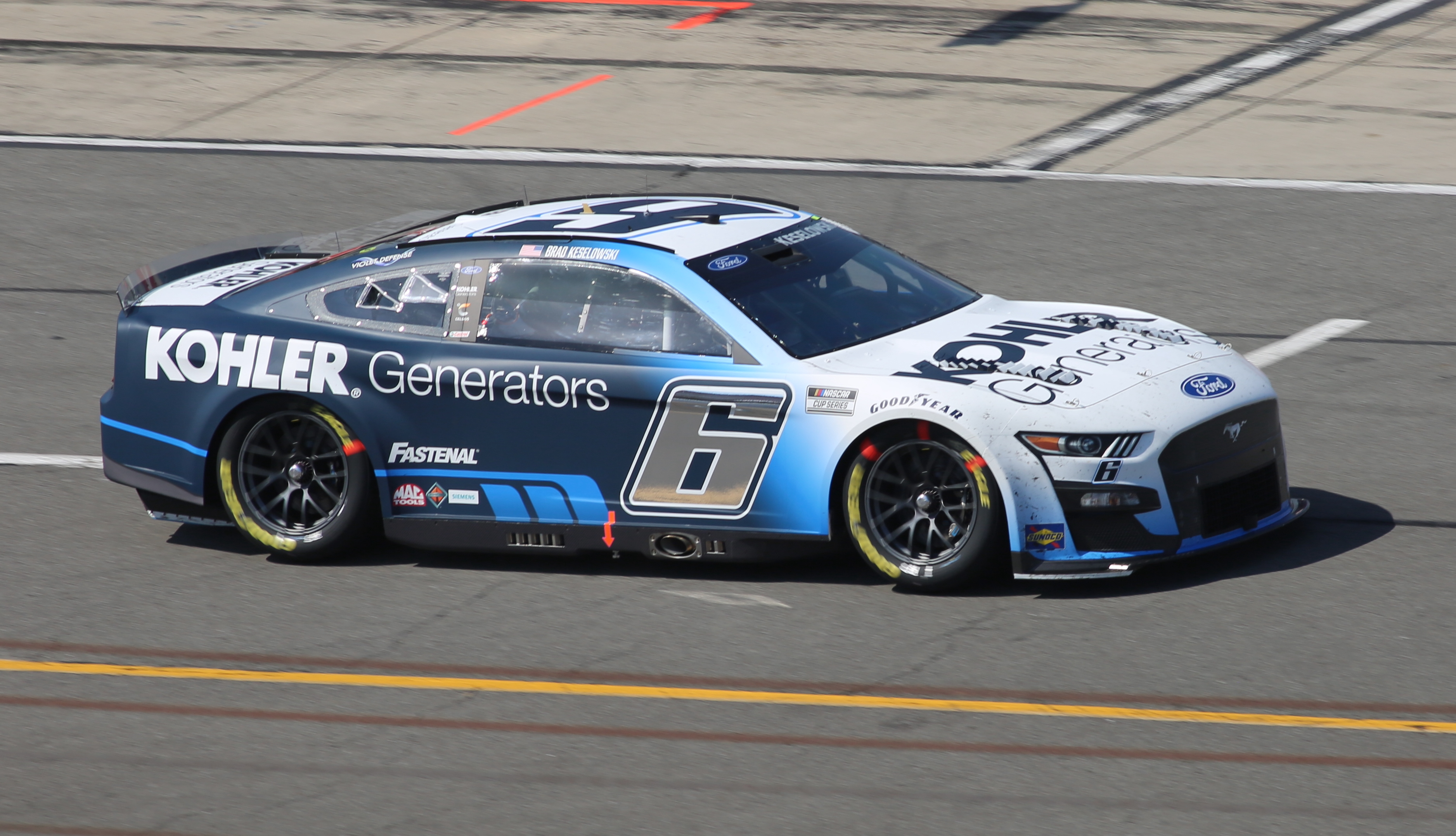
Brad Keselowski in the No. 6 at Pocono in 2022.

On July 20, 2021, it was confirmed that Newman would not be returning to Roush Fenway Racing in 2022. That same day, the 2012 Sprint Cup Series Champion Brad Keselowski was announced as co-owner of Roush-Fenway Racing and as Newman's replacement.

Keselowski began the 2022 season as driver/co-owner of RFK Racing with a ninth-place finish at the 2022 Daytona 500. He then failed to score a top-10 finish at the next 14 races. On March 24, 2022, crew chief Matt McCall was suspended for four races and fined US$100,000 for an L2 Penalty during post-race inspection after the 2022 Folds of Honor QuikTrip 500 at Atlanta. The penalty came under Sections 14.1 and 14.5 in the NASCAR Rule Book, both of which pertain to the modification of a single source supplied part. In addition, the No. 6 team was docked 100 driver and owner points and 10 playoff points. Team engineer Josh Sell was announced as Keselowski's crew chief for the 2022 Texas Grand Prix. On April 13, Scott Miller, NASCAR's senior vice president of competition, explained that the repairs No. 6's rear fascia did not meet original specifications, as a critical dimension of the part was altered. At Sonoma, Keselowski scored his first top-10 finish of the season since Daytona. Due to his mediocre finishes and the lack of a win during the regular season, as well as the penalty imposed on the team, Keselowski missed the playoffs for the first time since 2013. Keselowski finished fourth at Martinsville, but was disqualified when his car did not meet the minimum weight requirements during post-race inspection. The No. 6 finished the season 25th in the points standings.

Keselowski started the 2023 season with a 22nd place finish at the 2023 Daytona 500. He made his 500th career start at Gateway. Despite not winning a race, Keselowski greatly improved his finishes enough to make it to the playoffs. He was eliminated from the Round of 12 at the conclusion of the Charlotte Roval race. Keselowski finished the season eighth in the points standings, making it the first time the No. 6 finished in the top-10 in the final standings since Mark Martin finished ninth in 2006.

Keselowski started the 2024 season with a 33rd place DNF at the 2024 Daytona 500. At Darlington, he took advantage of teammate Chris Buescher and Tyler Reddick colliding in turn 4 with 10 laps to go, and held off Ty Gibbs for his first win of 2024, snapping a 110 race winless streak for himself and a 33 race winless streak across all three series for Ford dating back to the 2023 Cup Series Season Finale Keselowski was eliminated from the playoffs at the conclusion of the Round of 16, due to finishes of 19th, 26th, and 26th at Atlanta, Watkins Glen, and Bristol, respectively. On November 7, RFK announced that McCall would not return to the No. 6 car in 2025.

Keselowski started the 2025 season with a 26th place finish at the 2025 Daytona 500. With no wins during the regular season, he failed to make the playoffs and finished the season 20th in the points standings.

For the 2026 season, Corey LaJoie will drive the No. 6 car at the Cook Out Clash, as Keselowski injured his leg in a skiing accident in December 2025. Keselowski returned to the No. 6 at Daytona, where he drove the car to a top-five finish. On September 29, 2026, Keselowski announced he would leave RFK Racing as an owner and driver.

Ryan Preece (2027)

On November 4, 2026, RFK announced that Ryan Preece will move from the No. 60 car to the No. 6 car.

==== Car No. 6 results ====
Year	Driver	No.	Make	1	2	3	4	5	6	7	8	9	10	11	12	13	14	15	16	17	18	19	20	21	22	23	24	25	26	27	28	29	30	31	32	33	34	35	36	Owners	Pts
1988	Mark Martin	6	Ford	DAY; 41	RCH; 25	CAR; 12	ATL; 31	DAR; 6	BRI; 2	NWS; 29	MAR; 23	TAL; 12	CLT; 37	DOV; 9	RSD; 7	POC; 4	MCH; 14	DAY; 17	POC; 7	TAL; 7	GLN; 28	MCH; 32	BRI; 27	DAR; 19	RCH; 4	DOV; 39	MAR; 9	CLT; 9	NWS; 19	CAR; 28	PHO; 36	ATL; 20								15th	3142
1989	Mark Martin	6	Ford	DAY; 33	CAR; 5	ATL; 38	RCH; 11	DAR; 4	BRI; 6	NWS; 3	MAR; 6	TAL; 3	CLT; 6	DOV; 2	SON; 31	POC; 15	MCH; 12	DAY; 16	POC; 3	TAL; 3	GLN; 2	MCH; 9	BRI; 20	DAR; 2	RCH; 17	DOV; 2	MAR; 23	CLT; 3	NWS; 2	CAR; 1	PHO; 3	ATL; 30								3rd	4053
1990	Mark Martin	6	Ford	DAY; 21	RCH; 1	CAR; 26	ATL; 5	DAR; 2	BRI; 2	NWS; 6	MAR; 7	TAL; 3	CLT; 3	DOV; 4	SON; 2	POC; 14	MCH; 4	DAY; 11	POC; 6	TAL; 9	GLN; 5	MCH; 1^{*}	BRI; 3	DAR; 6	RCH; 2	DOV; 2	MAR; 3	NWS; 1	CLT; 14	CAR; 11	PHO; 10	ATL; 6								2nd	4404
1991	Mark Martin	6	Ford	DAY; 21	RCH; 6	CAR; 14	ATL; 17	DAR; 4	BRI; 4	NWS; 9	MAR; 29	TAL; 24	CLT; 23	DOV; 5	SON; 9	POC; 3	MCH; 3	DAY; 11	POC; 2	TAL; 3	GLN; 3	MCH; 4	BRI; 4	DAR; 29	RCH; 33	DOV; 21	MAR; 5	NWS; 5	CLT; 35^{*}	CAR; 3	PHO; 19	ATL; 1^{*}								6th	3914
1992	Mark Martin	6	Ford	DAY; 29	CAR; 5	RCH; 30	ATL; 13	DAR; 3	BRI; 15	NWS; 16	MAR; 1	TAL; 8	CLT; 33	DOV; 24	SON; 3	POC; 2	MCH; 6	DAY; 8	POC; 6	TAL; 20	GLN; 4	MCH; 9	BRI; 25	DAR; 2	RCH; 2	DOV; 19	MAR; 8	NWS; 2	CLT; 1	CAR; 30	PHO; 2	ATL; 32								6th	3887
1993	Mark Martin	6	Ford	DAY; 6	CAR; 5	RCH; 7	ATL; 32^{*}	DAR; 2	BRI; 8	NWS; 31	MAR; 10	TAL; 12	SON; 40	CLT; 28	DOV; 4	POC; 31	MCH; 6^{*}	DAY; 6	NHA; 2	POC; 13	TAL; 3	GLN; 1^{*}	MCH; 1	BRI; 1	DAR; 1^{*}	RCH; 6	DOV; 31	MAR; 16	NWS; 16	CLT; 2	CAR; 5	PHO; 1^{*}	ATL; 20							3rd	4150
1994	Mark Martin	6	Ford	DAY; 13	CAR; 4	RCH; 6	ATL; 5	DAR; 2	BRI; 21	NWS; 13	MAR; 3	TAL; 38	SON; 8	CLT; 32	DOV; 4	POC; 5	MCH; 3	DAY; 4	NHA; 4	POC; 31	TAL; 6	IND; 35	GLN; 1^{*}	MCH; 2	BRI; 2	DAR; 25	RCH; 6	DOV; 19	MAR; 16	NWS; 5	CLT; 39	CAR; 7	PHO; 2	ATL; 1^{*}						2nd	4250
1995	Mark Martin	6	Ford	DAY; 3	CAR; 7	RCH; 8	ATL; 9	DAR; 37	BRI; 8	NWS; 3	MAR; 5	TAL; 1^{*}	SON; 2	CLT; 28	DOV; 35	POC; 11	MCH; 8	DAY; 4	NHA; 3	POC; 7	TAL; 7	IND; 5	GLN; 1^{*}	MCH; 38	BRI; 5	DAR; 33	RCH; 15	DOV; 8	MAR; 12	NWS; 1^{*}	CLT; 1	CAR; 3	PHO; 8	ATL; 17						4th	4320
1996	Mark Martin	6	Ford	DAY; 4	CAR; 32	RCH; 5	ATL; 26	DAR; 6	BRI; 3	NWS; 37	MAR; 21	TAL; 34	SON; 2	CLT; 7	DOV; 40	POC; 4	MCH; 7	DAY; 11	NHA; 33	POC; 9^{*}	TAL; 3	IND; 4	GLN; 3	MCH; 2^{*}	BRI; 3	DAR; 3	RCH; 9	DOV; 5	MAR; 9	NWS; 9	CLT; 2	CAR; 7	PHO; 2^{*}	ATL; 7						5th	4278
1997	Mark Martin	6	Ford	DAY; 7^{*}	CAR; 13	RCH; 13	ATL; 6	DAR; 24	TEX; 38	BRI; 3	MAR; 5	SON; 1^{*}	TAL; 1	CLT; 3	DOV; 2	POC; 4	MCH; 3	CAL; 10	DAY; 27	NHA; 5	POC; 5	IND; 6	GLN; 5	MCH; 1^{*}	BRI; 2	DAR; 8	RCH; 25	NHA; 9	DOV; 1	MAR; 11	CLT; 4	TAL; 30	CAR; 6	PHO; 6	ATL; 3					3rd	4681
1998	Mark Martin	6	Ford	DAY; 38	CAR; 3^{*}	LVS; 1^{*}	ATL; 25	DAR; 7	BRI; 7	TEX; 1	MAR; 29	TAL; 23	CAL; 1^{*}	CLT; 4^{*}	DOV; 7	RCH; 5	MCH; 1	POC; 5	SON; 6	NHA; 2	POC; 2	IND; 2	GLN; 2	MCH; 4	BRI; 1^{*}	NHA; 2	DAR; 40	RCH; 3	DOV; 1^{*}	MAR; 3	CLT; 1^{*}	TAL; 34	DAY; 16	PHO; 2	CAR; 4	ATL; 3				2nd	4964
1999	Mark Martin	6	Ford	DAY; 31	CAR; 1	LVS; 10	ATL; 3	DAR; 5	TEX; 34	BRI; 2	MAR; 5	TAL; 3	CAL; 38	RCH; 2	CLT; 3	DOV; 3	MCH; 10	POC; 5	SON; 2	DAY; 17	NHA; 6	POC; 3	IND; 4	GLN; 10	MCH; 7	BRI; 6	DAR; 4	RCH; 35	NHA; 17	DOV; 1^{*}	MAR; 16	CLT; 4	TAL; 15	CAR; 6	PHO; 2	HOM; 4	ATL; 4			3rd	4943
2000	Mark Martin	6	Ford	DAY; 5	CAR; 8	LVS; 3	ATL; 3	DAR; 9	BRI; 16	TEX; 11	MAR; 1	TAL; 6^{*}	CAL; 14	RCH; 32	CLT; 12	DOV; 36	MCH; 40	POC; 5	SON; 3	DAY; 4	NHA; 3	POC; 43	IND; 43	GLN; 2	MCH; 11	BRI; 3	DAR; 14	RCH; 3	NHA; 8	DOV; 6	MAR; 18	CLT; 5	TAL; 7	CAR; 40	PHO; 6	HOM; 3	ATL; 40			8th	4410
2001	Mark Martin	6	Ford	DAY; 33	CAR; 20	LVS; 6^{*}	ATL; 41	DAR; 21	BRI; 34	TEX; 9	MAR; 39	TAL; 4	CAL; 40	RCH; 13	CLT; 4	DOV; 9	MCH; 16	POC; 5	SON; 10	DAY; 18	CHI; 17	NHA; 18	POC; 7	IND; 22	GLN; 15	MCH; 8	BRI; 37	DAR; 20	RCH; 19	DOV; 32	KAN; 6	CLT; 9	MAR; 7	TAL; 9	PHO; 19	CAR; 34	HOM; 24	ATL; 22	NHA; 9	12th	4095
2002	Mark Martin	6	Ford	DAY; 6	CAR; 21	LVS; 3	ATL; 8	DAR; 29	BRI; 11	TEX; 3	MAR; 8	TAL; 37	CAL; 5	RCH; 4	CLT; 1	DOV; 41	POC; 2	MCH; 9	SON; 7	DAY; 5	CHI; 9	NHA; 16	POC; 13	IND; 28	GLN; 10	MCH; 5	BRI; 23	DAR; 11	RCH; 6	NHA; 16	DOV; 2	KAN; 25	TAL; 30	CLT; 16	MAR; 10	ATL; 8	CAR; 2^{*}	PHO; 4	HOM; 4	2nd	4762
2003	Mark Martin	6	Ford	DAY; 5	CAR; 7	LVS; 43	ATL; 42	DAR; 4	BRI; 29	TEX; 5	TAL; 26	MAR; 17	CAL; 17	RCH; 5	CLT; 29	DOV; 18	POC; 2	MCH; 9	SON; 19	DAY; 20	CHI; 14	NHA; 18	POC; 41	IND; 9	GLN; 10	MCH; 17	BRI; 36	DAR; 33	RCH; 13	NHA; 28	DOV; 22	TAL; 23	KAN; 20	CLT; 11	MAR; 14	ATL; 39	PHO; 10	CAR; 41	HOM; 33	17th	3769
2004	Mark Martin	6	Ford	DAY; 43	CAR; 12	LVS; 5	ATL; 14	DAR; 7	BRI; 23	TEX; 17	MAR; 34	TAL; 6	CAL; 11	RCH; 7	CLT; 36	DOV; 1	POC; 36	MCH; 34	SON; 8	DAY; 6	CHI; 24	NHA; 14	POC; 2	IND; 25	GLN; 3	MCH; 2	BRI; 13	CAL; 3^{*}	RCH; 5	NHA; 13	DOV; 2	TAL; 15	KAN; 20	CLT; 13	MAR; 12	ATL; 2^{*}	PHO; 15	DAR; 2	HOM; 11	4th	6399
2005	Mark Martin	6	Ford	DAY; 6	CAL; 7	LVS; 30	ATL; 4	BRI; 31	MAR; 3	TEX; 20	PHO; 16	TAL; 33	DAR; 4	RCH; 15	CLT; 28	DOV; 3	POC; 7	MCH; 3	SON; 15	DAY; 39	CHI; 10	NHA; 15	POC; 3	IND; 7	GLN; 7	MCH; 17	BRI; 16	CAL; 11	RCH; 13	NHA; 7	DOV; 4	TAL; 41	KAN; 1^{*}	CLT; 5	MAR; 34	ATL; 3	TEX; 2	PHO; 14	HOM; 2	4th	6428
2006	Mark Martin	6	Ford	DAY; 12	CAL; 9	LVS; 6	ATL; 2	BRI; 6	MAR; 13	TEX; 9	PHO; 11	TAL; 35	RCH; 11	DAR; 8	CLT; 4	DOV; 9	POC; 17	MCH; 27	SON; 13	DAY; 33	CHI; 18	NHA; 4	POC; 19	IND; 5	GLN; 20	MCH; 5	BRI; 28	CAL; 12	RCH; 5	NHA; 11	DOV; 14	KAN; 3	TAL; 8	CLT; 30	MAR; 24	ATL; 36	TEX; 22	PHO; 6	HOM; 18	9th	6168
2007	David Ragan	6	Ford	DAY; 5	CAL; 16	LVS; 37	ATL; 33	BRI; 26	MAR; 15	TEX; 39	PHO; 41	TAL; 17	RCH; 20	DAR; 27	CLT; 37	DOV; 14	POC; 26	MCH; 21	SON; 29	NHA; 15	DAY; 12	CHI; 25	IND; 16	POC; 33	GLN; 32	MCH; 18	BRI; 41	CAL; 12	RCH; 3	NHA; 19	DOV; 25	KAN; 16	TAL; 34	CLT; 40	MAR; 26	ATL; 33	TEX; 37	PHO; 32	HOM; 10	24th	3251
2008	David Ragan	6	Ford	DAY; 42	CAL; 14	LVS; 7	ATL; 23	BRI; 21	MAR; 11	TEX; 13	PHO; 27	TAL; 4	RCH; 17	DAR; 5	CLT; 12	DOV; 15	POC; 24	MCH; 8	SON; 24	NHA; 40	DAY; 5	CHI; 8	IND; 14	POC; 5	GLN; 30	MCH; 3	BRI; 10	CAL; 13	RCH; 32	NHA; 28	DOV; 28	KAN; 8	TAL; 3	CLT; 10	MAR; 13	ATL; 8	TEX; 11	PHO; 10	HOM; 24	13th	4299
2009	David Ragan	6	Ford	DAY; 6	CAL; 17	LVS; 42	ATL; 19	BRI; 27	MAR; 27	TEX; 37	PHO; 22	TAL; 12	RCH; 23	DAR; 38	CLT; 24	DOV; 24	POC; 26	MCH; 15	SON; 33	NHA; 38	DAY; 13	CHI; 25	IND; 24	POC; 22	GLN; 24	MCH; 30	BRI; 14	ATL; 33	RCH; 33	NHA; 33	DOV; 24	KAN; 35	CAL; 7	CLT; 20	MAR; 22	TAL; 17	TEX; 17	PHO; 23	HOM; 34	27th	3252
2010	David Ragan	6	Ford	DAY; 16	CAL; 23	LVS; 23	ATL; 37	BRI; 29	MAR; 16	PHO; 19	TEX; 15	TAL; 6	RCH; 24	DAR; 14	DOV; 26	CLT; 24	POC; 26	MCH; 34	SON; 25	NHA; 20	DAY; 38	CHI; 12	IND; 20	POC; 14	GLN; 25	MCH; 11	BRI; 32	ATL; 19	RCH; 23	NHA; 22	DOV; 24	KAN; 16	CAL; 32	CLT; 10	MAR; 17	TAL; 21	TEX; 8	PHO; 25	HOM; 20	24th	3599
2011	David Ragan	6	Ford	DAY; 14	PHO; 36	LVS; 22	BRI; 16	CAL; 22	MAR; 8	TEX; 7	TAL; 39	RCH; 4	DAR; 21	DOV; 28	CLT; 2	KAN; 13	POC; 17	MCH; 20	SON; 29	DAY; 1	KEN; 8	NHA; 14	IND; 23	POC; 34	GLN; 28	MCH; 14	BRI; 20	ATL; 35	RCH; 4	CHI; 11	NHA; 7	DOV; 21	KAN; 20	CLT; 11	TAL; 28	MAR; 33	TEX; 12	PHO; 33	HOM; 38	23rd	906
2012	Ricky Stenhouse Jr.	6	Ford	DAY; 20	PHO	LVS	BRI	CAL	MAR	TEX	KAN	RCH	TAL	DAR	CLT	DOV	POC	MCH	SON	KEN	DAY	NHA	IND	POC	GLN	MCH	BRI	ATL	RCH	CHI	NHA	DOV; 12	TAL	CLT; 35	KAN	MAR	TEX	PHO	HOM; 39	46th	46
2014	Trevor Bayne	6	Ford	DAY	PHO	LVS	BRI	CAL	MAR	TEX	DAR	RCH	TAL	KAN	CLT	DOV	POC	MCH	SON	KEN	DAY	NHA	IND	POC	GLN	MCH	BRI	ATL	RCH	CHI	NHA	DOV	KAN	CLT; DNQ	TAL	MAR	TEX	PHO	HOM	55th	0
2015	Trevor Bayne	6	Ford	DAY; 30	ATL; 19	LVS; 28	PHO; 28	CAL; 29	MAR; 18	TEX; 18	BRI; 28	RCH; 24	TAL; 41	KAN; 31	CLT; 27	DOV; 43	POC; 24	MCH; 9	SON; 23	DAY; 9	KEN; 13	NHA; 32	IND; 40	POC; 40	GLN; 22	MCH; 22	BRI; 15	DAR; 35	RCH; 23	CHI; 28	NHA; 16	DOV; 31	CLT; 22	KAN; 18	TAL; 21	MAR; 31	TEX; 39	PHO; 34	HOM; 18	29th	655
2016	Trevor Bayne	6	Ford	DAY; 28	ATL; 22	LVS; 17	PHO; 23	CAL; 20	MAR; 27	TEX; 15	BRI; 5	RCH; 17	TAL; 10	KAN; 25	DOV; 10	CLT; 25	POC; 13	MCH; 15	SON; 25	DAY; 3	KEN; 11	NHA; 23	IND; 30	POC; 19	GLN; 9	BRI; 12	MCH; 25	DAR; 40	RCH; 14	CHI; 23	NHA; 38	DOV; 20	CLT; 18	KAN; 17	TAL; 17	MAR; 23	TEX; 30	PHO; 28	HOM; 20	23rd	762
2017	Trevor Bayne	6	Ford	DAY; 10	ATL; 12	LVS; 13	PHO; 19	CAL; 23	MAR; 13	TEX; 13	BRI; 11	RCH; 13	TAL; 37	KAN; 10	CLT; 16	DOV; 21	POC; 21	MCH; 17	SON; 27	DAY; 23	KEN; 37	NHA; 20	IND; 20	POC; 20	GLN; 35	MCH; 5	BRI; 7	DAR; 35	RCH; 25	CHI; 22	NHA; 24	DOV; 24	CLT; 14	TAL; 3	KAN; 20	MAR; 6	TEX; 28	PHO; 38	HOM; 19	22nd	660
2018	Trevor Bayne	6	Ford	DAY; 13	ATL; 35	LVS; 20	PHO; 20	CAL; 37	MAR; 33	TEX; 12	BRI; 24	RCH; 21	TAL; 38	DOV; 19					SON; 27	CHI; 26	DAY; 20					MCH; 34	BRI; 11			LVS; 13		CLT; 35		TAL; 13	KAN; 30		TEX; 21			25th	555
2018	Matt Kenseth	6	Ford												KAN; 36	CLT; 17	POC; 13	MCH; 33				KEN; 19	NHA; 15	POC; 18	GLN; 29			DAR; 25	IND; 12		RCH; 25		DOV; 20			MAR; 23		PHO; 7	HOM; 6	25th	555
2019	Ryan Newman	6	Ford	DAY; 14	ATL; 13	LVS; 24	PHO; 12	CAL; 22	MAR; 23	TEX; 11	BRI; 9	RCH; 9	TAL; 7	DOV; 18	KAN; 23	CLT; 16	POC; 16	MCH; 8	SON; 7	CHI; 17	DAY; 5	KEN; 9	NHA; 7	POC; 14	GLN; 25	MCH; 12	BRI; 11	DAR; 23	IND; 8	LVS; 10	RCH; 5	CLT; 32	DOV; 22	TAL; 2	KAN; 40	MAR; 10	TEX; 15	PHO; 18	HOM; 7	15th	2219
2020	Ryan Newman	6	Ford	DAY; 9				DAR; 15	DAR; 14	CLT; 27	CLT; 17	BRI; 15	ATL; 14	MAR; 12	HOM; 30	TAL; 23	POC; 15	POC; 18	IND; 34	KEN; 17	TEX; 13	KAN; 28	NHA; 21	MCH; 28	MCH; 13	DAY; 19	DOV; 19	DOV; 24	DAY; 36	DAR; 15	RCH; 23	BRI; 25	LVS; 15	TAL; 6	CLT; 31	KAN; 22	TEX; 19	MAR; 18	PHO; 24	23rd	611
2020	Ross Chastain	6	Ford		LVS; 27	CAL; 17	PHO; 23																																	23rd	611
2021	Ryan Newman	6	Ford	DAY; 38	DAY; 20	HOM; 7	LVS; 18	PHO; 28	ATL; 13	BRI; 5	MAR; 19	RCH; 30	TAL; 13	KAN; 16	DAR; 10	DOV; 23	COA; 24	CLT; 27	SON; 33	NSH; 13	POC; 37	POC; 22	ROA; 32	ATL; 28	NHA; 24	GLN; 25	IND; 10	MCH; 24	DAY; 3	DAR; 14	RCH; 20	BRI; 38	LVS; 20	TAL; 21	CLT; 39	TEX; 35	KAN; 27	MAR; 32	PHO; 23	28th	546
2022	Brad Keselowski	6	Ford	DAY; 9*	CAL; 27	LVS; 24	PHO; 23	ATL; 12	COA; 14	RCH; 13	MAR; 17	BRI; 11	TAL; 23	DOV; 20	DAR; 34	KAN; 14	CLT; 30	GTW; 20	SON; 10	NSH; 29	ROA; 33	ATL; 18	NHA; 7	POC; 14	IND; 20	MCH; 15	RCH; 15	GLN; 19	DAY; 35	DAR; 7	KAN; 25	BRI; 13	TEX; 8	TAL; 24	CLT; 14	LVS; 17	HOM; 5	MAR; 36	PHO; 35	24th	629
2023	Brad Keselowski	6	Ford	DAY; 22*	CAL; 7	LVS; 17	PHO; 18	ATL; 2	COA; 35	RCH; 10	BRD; 17	MAR; 24	TAL; 5	DOV; 8	KAN; 19	DAR; 4	CLT; 19	GTW; 28	SON; 16	NSH; 11	CSC; 24	ATL; 6	NHA; 5	POC; 16	RCH; 6*	MCH; 4	IND; 20	GLN; 15	DAY; 2	DAR; 6	KAN; 9	BRI; 8	TEX; 7	TAL; 32	ROV; 18	LVS; 4	HOM; 28	MAR; 33	PHO; 15	8th	2302
2024	Brad Keselowski	6	Ford	DAY; 33	ATL; 33	LVS; 13	PHO; 4	BRI; 3	COA; 33	RCH; 8	MAR; 24	TEX; 2	TAL; 2	DOV; 30	KAN; 11	DAR; 1	CLT; 2	GTW; 3	SON; 13	IOW; 10	NHA; 28	NSH; 25	CSC; 18	POC; 7	IND; 21	RCH; 16	MCH; 5	DAY; 8	DAR; 14	ATL; 19	GLN; 26	BRI; 26	KAN; 22	TAL; 2	ROV; 23	LVS; 36	HOM; 17	MAR; 9*	PHO; 15	13th	2208
2025	Brad Keselowski	6	Ford	DAY; 26	ATL; 39	COA; 15	PHO; 33	LVS; 11	HOM; 26	MAR; 26	DAR; 33	BRI; 16	TAL; 36	TEX; 28	KAN; 37	CLT; 5	NSH; 23	MCH; 10	MXC; 25	POC; 9	ATL; 2	CSC; 37	SON; 11	DOV; 10	IND; 5	IOW; 3	GLN; 31	RCH; 9	DAY; 18	DAR; 15	GTW; 17	BRI; 2	NHA; 23	KAN; 8	ROV; 36	LVS; 10	TAL; 10	MAR; 20	PHO; 2	20th	762
2026	Brad Keselowski	6	Ford	DAY; 5	ATL; 17	COA; 20	PHO; 15	LVS; 10	DAR; 2*	MAR; 13	BRI; 14	KAN; 6	TAL; 31	TEX; 13	GLN; 30	CLT; 15	NSH; 34	MCH; 34	POC; 38	COR; 34	SON; 15	CHI; 21	ATL; 26	NWS; 7	IND; 6	IOW; 27	RCH; 26	NHA; 11	DAY; 14	DAR; 23	GTW; 12	BRI; 15	KAN; 12	LVS; 24	CLT; 29	PHO; 16	TAL; 24	MAR; 27	HOM; 28	19th	723
2027	Ryan Preece	6	Ford	DAY	ATL	COA	PHO	LVS	DAR	BRI	MAR	TAL	TEX	KAN	DOV	CLT	NSH	POC	MCH	CHI	IOW	SON	ATL	IND	COR	BRI	GTW	DAY	DAR	RCH	GLN	NHA	KAN	LVS	CLT	PHO	TAL	MAR	HOM		

=== Car No. 16 history ===
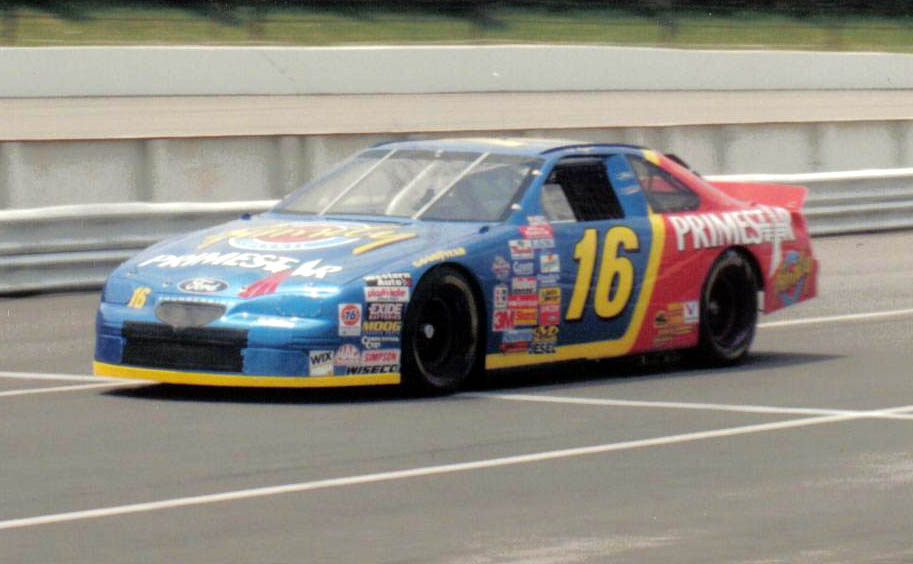
1997 Family Channel-sponsored Ford Thunderbird

Wally Dallenbach Jr. (1992–1993)

The first car to make Roush Racing a multi-car stable, the 16 team debuted at the 1992 Daytona 500 with Keystone Beer as the sponsor. Wally Dallenbach Jr. drove the car to a 15th-place finish. Dallenbach, however, earned only one top ten finish that year and finished 24th in points. 1993 proved to be a little better with Dallenbach posting four top tens.

Ted Musgrave (1994–1998)

However, for 1994, the team underwent major changes. Driving duties were given to Ted Musgrave, with The Family Channel becoming the new sponsor. The car's performance improved drastically, with Musgrave notching three poles and finishing 13th in points. The 1995 season saw Musgrave improving six spots in points to seventh. Despite this success, Musgrave never visited victory lane in his tenure behind the wheel of the 16, finishing 16th in points in 1996 and 12th in 1997.

Kevin Lepage (1998–2000)

Midway through 1998, Musgrave was released while sitting 17th in the points standings. For the final 13 races of the season, he was replaced by rookie Kevin Lepage, who left his ride with LJ Racing. In the Pepsi 400 in October, Lepage fractured his leg in a crash. Then-Roush development driver Matt Kenseth practiced the car for Lepage the next race at Phoenix. Lepage earned eight top 20 finishes including a sixth at Charlotte, finishing runner-up to Kenny Irwin, Jr for Rookie of the Year honors.

Teamed with sponsor PrimeStar, later replaced by TV Guide, Lepage and the No. 16 team began 1999 with a fifth-place finish at Darlington, later having a chance to win the Winston Million/No Bull 5 bonus, and earning a pole at the season ending race at Atlanta. Despite the bright spots, Lepage finished 25th in points with two top ten finishes. TV Guide did not renew their contract for the 2000 season. The No. 16 ran the beginning of the season unsponsored, before ultimately signing a multi-year contract with FamilyClick. Over the course of the year, Lepage missed two races and dropped to 28th in the standings. Dissastisfied with the team's performance, FamilyClick did not return as a sponsor and the team was disbanded, with Roush contracting to four full-time teams.

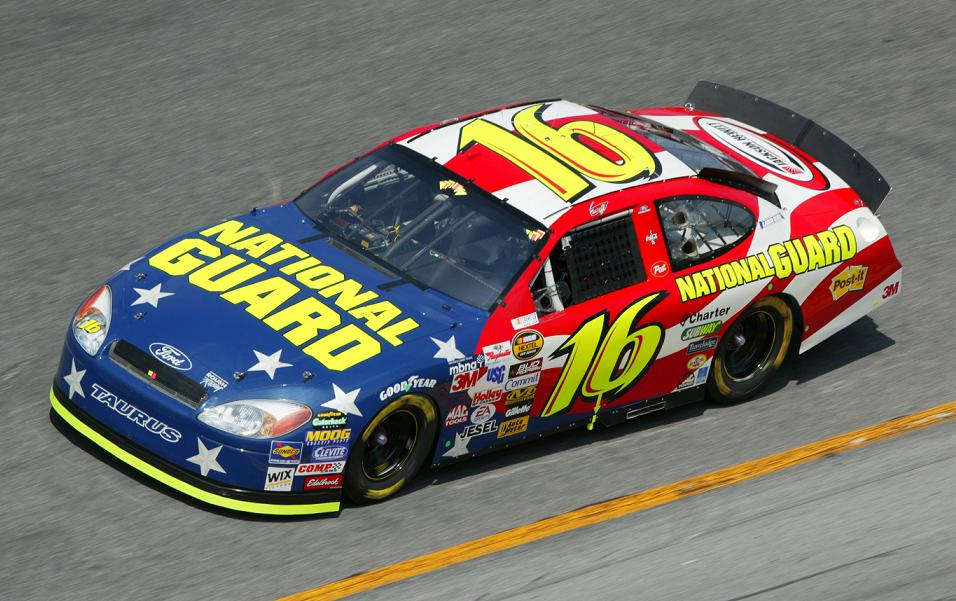
Greg Biffle's 2005 No. 16 National Guard Ford Taurus.

Greg Biffle (2002–2016)

During the 2002 season, the No. 16 was used to prepare 2000 NASCAR Craftsman Truck Series champion and eventual Busch Series champion Greg Biffle for his Rookie of the Year campaign the following year. Biffle failed to qualify in three of his four attempts in the car; he made a total seven starts as a substitute for Andy Petree Racing, and later Petty Enterprises. Biffle ran full-time as a rookie in 2003, with W. W. Grainger sponsoring the car. Biffle started 35 out of 36 races, won the Pepsi 400 at Daytona, and finished runner-up to Jamie McMurray for Rookie of the Year. The next year, the car had a new primary sponsorship from the U.S. National Guard, with major associate ones from Subway, Jackson Hewitt, and Travelodge. Biffle opened the year with a pole in the Daytona 500. Over the 2004 season, Biffle scored wins at Michigan and Homestead, and finished 17th in points. In 2005, 3M's Post-it note Brand and Charter Communications joined as part-time sponsors. 2005 was to be the most successful year for car No. 16 to date, as the National Guard-sponsored Ford won a season high six races and finished runner-up in the Chase for the Nextel Cup. Biffle would sign an extension to drive the No. 16 until at least 2008. However Biffle would miss the chase in 2006 finishing 13th in points despite winning twice. He scored one win in 2007 at Kansas and finished 14th in points.

After 2007, National Guard did not renew its contract, moving to Hendrick Motorsports and the No. 25. Ameriquest Mortgage-sponsored car, which had sponsored the majority of the 2006 Busch Series season for Roush, had signed a three-year contract to move up to Biffle's No. 16 Cup ride, with 3M sponsoring six races. By March, however, the company had asked to be released from the final two years of its contract, along with relinquishing naming rights to Rangers Ballpark in Arlington. Ameriquest was one of the biggest subprime loan providers, and the sponsorship pullout likely coincided with the Housing Bubble of 2007. Several companies including Aflac, Nintendo, Dish Network, and Jackson Hewitt sponsored the remainder of the season instead.

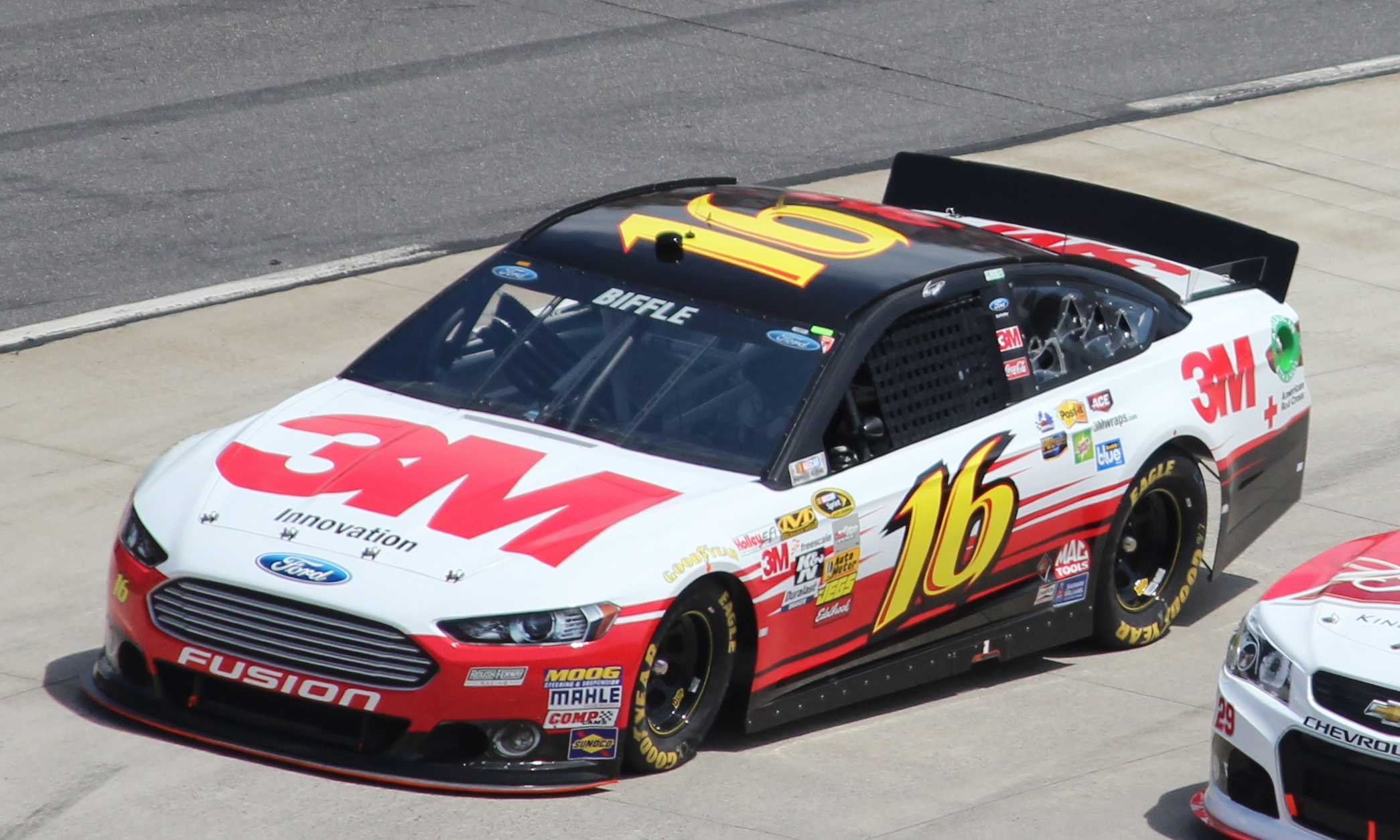
Biffle with longtime sponsor 3M in 2013

It was announced on June 27, 2008, that Biffle signed a contract extension to remain at Roush-Fenway through 2011 with 3M as his major sponsor. That season, he finished third in points and won two races, but didn't return to victory lane in 2009. In 2010, 3M returned as the primary sponsor with Red Cross as the secondary. Biffle and the No. 16 team got off to a good start finishing third in the Daytona and stayed in the top 12 in points all year. Biffle also won two races that year the Sunoco Red Cross Pennsylvania 500 at Pocono as well as the Price Chopper 400 at Kansas leading to a sixth-place finish in the standings. Biffle struggled for most of the next year, failing to return to victory lane and finishing 16th in points. In 2012, he started the season with three straight third-place finishes and a win early at Texas put him in the points lead, but he eventually gave it up to teammate Matt Kenseth.

In 2013, Roush Fenway began to struggle. However, Biffle did get the 1000th win for manufacturer Ford at Michigan in June and made the Chase, finishing 9th in points. In 2014, the team continued to struggle for speed, going winless for the first time since 2011 and finishing 14th in points. In August 2014 it was announced that longtime sponsor 3M would leave the team for Hendrick Motorsports, and that Scotts-Miracle Gro's Ortho brand would take over the primary sponsorship. Scotts, which had previously been a sponsor of Carl Edwards at Roush, made its debut at Bristol in August 2014. For the 2015 season, the No. 16 would struggle for most of the season, slipping to 20th in points, the best out of all Roush teams for the year, followed by a 23rd-place finish in 2016. After the 2016 season ended, RFR and Biffle parted ways, the car's charter, along with Roush driver Chris Buescher, were eventually leased to JTG Daugherty Racing. After not running for three years, the No. 16 returned for the 2020 Daytona 500 with Justin Haley for Kaulig Racing.

==== Car No. 16 results ====
Year	Driver	No.	Make	1	2	3	4	5	6	7	8	9	10	11	12	13	14	15	16	17	18	19	20	21	22	23	24	25	26	27	28	29	30	31	32	33	34	35	36	Owners	Pts
1992	Wally Dallenbach Jr.	16	Ford	DAY; 15	CAR; 21	RCH; 24	ATL; 27	DAR; 30	BRI; 22	NWS; 30	MAR; 19	TAL; 14	CLT; 28	DOV; 34	SON; 25	POC; 27	MCH; 18	DAY; 11	POC; 32	TAL; 14	GLN; 5	MCH; 20	BRI; 19	DAR; 24	RCH; 23	DOV; 31	MAR; 14	NWS; 24	CLT; 20	CAR; 23	PHO; 12	ATL; 38								24th	2799
1993	Wally Dallenbach Jr.	16	Ford	DAY; 10	CAR; 20	RCH; 27	ATL; 25	DAR; 13	BRI; 11	NWS; 21	MAR; 34	TAL; 29	SON; 7	CLT; 40	DOV; 12	POC; 25	MCH; 25	DAY; 35	NHA; 27	POC; 17	TAL; 10	GLN; 2	MCH; 31	BRI; 21	DAR; 11	RCH; 15	DOV; 15	MAR; 27	NWS; 15	CLT; 24	CAR; 31	PHO; 34	ATL; 33							22nd	2978
1994	Ted Musgrave	16	Ford	DAY; 38	CAR; 13	RCH; 13	ATL; 11	DAR; 10	BRI; 19	NWS; 21	MAR; 10	TAL; 11	SON; 6	CLT; 16	DOV; 35	POC; 15	MCH; 9	DAY; 14	NHA; 7	POC; 32	TAL; 41	IND; 13	GLN; 19	MCH; 24	BRI; 11	DAR; 39	RCH; 17	DOV; 14	MAR; 9	NWS; 9	CLT; 18	CAR; 13	PHO; 5	ATL; 28						13th	3477
1995	Ted Musgrave	16	Ford	DAY; 4	CAR; 33	RCH; 13	ATL; 19	DAR; 3	BRI; 18	NWS; 6	MAR; 2	TAL; 11	SON; 6	CLT; 15	DOV; 3	POC; 2	MCH; 10	DAY; 5	NHA; 8	POC; 4	TAL; 11	IND; 16	GLN; 13	MCH; 28	BRI; 13	DAR; 22	RCH; 10	DOV; 11	MAR; 29	NWS; 20	CLT; 19	CAR; 22	PHO; 6	ATL; 27						7th	3949
1996	Ted Musgrave	16	Ford	DAY; 7	CAR; 31	RCH; 3	ATL; 18	DAR; 7	BRI; 25	NWS; 12	MAR; 9	TAL; 8	SON; 23	CLT; 30	DOV; 13	POC; 19	MCH; 8	DAY; 13	NHA; 11	POC; 19	TAL; 36	IND; 21	GLN; 12	MCH; 23	BRI; 12	DAR; 29	RCH; 15	DOV; 33	MAR; 20	NWS; 19	CLT; 17	CAR; 18	PHO; 4	ATL; 31						16th	3466
1997	Ted Musgrave	16	Ford	DAY; 13	CAR; 12	RCH; 20	ATL; 34	DAR; 2	TEX; 35	BRI; 38	MAR; 24	SON; 11	TAL; 24	CLT; 23	DOV; 11	POC; 6	MCH; 4*	CAL; 4	DAY; 12	NHA; 26	POC; 4	IND; 33	GLN; 6	MCH; 3	BRI; 15	DAR; 29	RCH; 9	NHA; 30	DOV; 24	MAR; 21	CLT; 17	TAL; 11	CAR; 32	PHO; 22	ATL; 31					12th	3556
1998	Ted Musgrave	16	Ford	DAY; 20	CAR; 35	LVS; 6	ATL; 29	DAR; 10	BRI; 8	TEX; 30	MAR; 2	TAL; 42	CAL; 33	CLT; 12	DOV; 22	RCH; 15	MCH; 26	POC; 17	SON; 19	NHA; 39	POC; 15	IND; 19	GLN; 19																	21st	3225
1998	Kevin Lepage	16	Ford																					MCH; 17	BRI; 10	NHA; 16	DAR; 39	RCH; 36	DOV; 12	MAR; 17	CLT; 6	TAL; 35	DAY; 40	PHO; 13	CAR; 43	ATL; 18				21st	3225
1999	Kevin Lepage	16	Ford	DAY; 13	CAR; 42	LVS; 21	ATL; 19	DAR; 22	TEX; 41	BRI; 35	MAR; 21	TAL; 12	CAL; 18	RCH; 13	CLT; 26	DOV; 26	MCH; 29	POC; 17	SON; 32	DAY; 30	NHA; 22	POC; 24	IND; 30	GLN; 25	MCH; 39	BRI; 22	DAR; 5	RCH; 26	NHA; 26	DOV; 13	MAR; 27	CLT; 9	TAL; 18	CAR; 22	PHO; 24	HOM; 26	ATL; 17			25th	3185
2000	Kevin Lepage	16	Ford	DAY; 36	CAR; 27	LVS; 11	ATL; 38	DAR; 10	BRI; 30	TEX; 5	MAR; 34	TAL; DNQ	CAL; 22	RCH; 21	CLT; 15	DOV; 21	MCH; 21	POC; 26	SON; 41	DAY; 37	NHA; 31	POC; 23	IND; 36	GLN; 32	MCH; 18	BRI; 18	DAR; 7	RCH; 22	NHA; 38	DOV; 38	MAR; 29	CLT; 12	TAL; 43	CAR; 36	PHO; 21	HOM; 27	ATL; DNQ			30th	2795
2002	Greg Biffle	16	Ford	DAY; DNQ	CAR	LVS	ATL	DAR	BRI	TEX	MAR	TAL	CAL; 13	RCH	CLT	DOV	POC	MCH	SON	DAY	CHI	NHA	POC	IND	GLN	MCH; DNQ	BRI	DAR	RCH	NHA	DOV	KAN	TAL	CLT	MAR	ATL; DNQ	CAR	PHO	HOM	54th	124
2003	Greg Biffle	16	Ford	DAY; 21	CAR; 22	LVS; DNQ	ATL; 13	DAR; 12	BRI; 5	TEX; 28	TAL; 22	MAR; 18	CAL; 18	RCH; 17	CLT; 16	DOV; 30	POC; 20	MCH; 31	SON; 37	DAY; 1	CHI; 20	NHA; 10	POC; 27	IND; 21	GLN; 30	MCH; 4	BRI; 22	DAR; 10	RCH; 20	NHA; 43	DOV; 7	TAL; 24	KAN; 12	CLT; 17	MAR; 19	ATL; 34	PHO; 15	CAR; 11	HOM; 35	20th	3696
2004	Greg Biffle	16	Ford	DAY; 12	CAR; 23	LVS; 40	ATL; 8	DAR; 12	BRI; 12	TEX; 31	MAR; 35	TAL; 15	CAL; 33	RCH; 21	CLT; 21	DOV; 26	POC; 11	MCH; 23	SON; 13	DAY; 31	CHI; 20	NHA; 35	POC; 4	IND; 6	GLN; 35	MCH; 1	BRI; 11	CAL; 36	RCH; 8	NHA; 28	DOV; 11	TAL; 28	KAN; 3	CLT; 33	MAR; 17	ATL; 10	PHO; 13	DAR; 24	HOM; 1	17th	3902
2005	Greg Biffle	16	Ford	DAY; 25	CAL; 1	LVS; 6	ATL; 3	BRI; 9	MAR; 29	TEX; 1	PHO; 41	TAL; 13	DAR; 1	RCH; 6	CLT; 6	DOV; 1	POC; 30	MCH; 1	SON; 14	DAY; 36	CHI; 11	NHA; 5	POC; 17	IND; 21	GLN; 38	MCH; 6	BRI; 3	CAL; 2	RCH; 3	NHA; 4	DOV; 13	TAL; 27	KAN; 2	CLT; 3	MAR; 20	ATL; 7	TEX; 20	PHO; 2	HOM; 1	2nd	6498
2006	Greg Biffle	16	Ford	DAY; 31	CAL; 42*	LVS; 8	ATL; 16*	BRI; 7	MAR; 31	TEX; 42	PHO; 15*	TAL; 38	RCH; 4	DAR; 1*	CLT; 7	DOV; 8	POC; 6	MCH; 4	SON; 4	DAY; 31	CHI; 11	NHA; 3	POC; 24	IND; 33	GLN; 38	MCH; 7	BRI; 19	CAL; 24	RCH; 6	NHA; 14	DOV; 5	KAN; 12	TAL; 41	CLT; 37	MAR; 32	ATL; 5	TEX; 35	PHO; 34	HOM; 1	13th	4075
2007	Greg Biffle	16	Ford	DAY; 25	CAL; 15	LVS; 16	ATL; 41	BRI; 5	MAR; 32	TEX; 6	PHO; 17	TAL; 29	RCH; 19	DAR; 15	CLT; 43	DOV; 6	POC; 30	MCH; 38	SON; 5	NHA; 31	DAY; 6	CHI; 11	IND; 15	POC; 23	GLN; 10	MCH; 19	BRI; 10	CAL; 17	RCH; 39	NHA; 13	DOV; 2	KAN; 1	TAL; 23	CLT; 27	MAR; 7	ATL; 22	TEX; 33	PHO; 2	HOM; 13	14th	3991
2008	Greg Biffle	16	Ford	DAY; 10	CAL; 15	LVS; 3	ATL; 4	BRI; 4	MAR; 20	TEX; 39	PHO; 9	TAL; 18	RCH; 14	DAR; 43	CLT; 2	DOV; 3*	POC; 15	MCH; 20	SON; 11	NHA; 21	DAY; 43	CHI; 4	IND; 8	POC; 13	GLN; 21	MCH; 4	BRI; 11	CAL; 2	RCH; 14	NHA; 1	DOV; 1	KAN; 3	TAL; 24	CLT; 7	MAR; 12	ATL; 10	TEX; 5	PHO; 11	HOM; 18	3rd	6467
2009	Greg Biffle	16	Ford	DAY; 20	CAL; 4	LVS; 7	ATL; 34	BRI; 39	MAR; 28	TEX; 3	PHO; 5	TAL; 7	RCH; 17	DAR; 8	CLT; 20	DOV; 3	POC; 11	MCH; 5	SON; 28	NHA; 18	DAY; 18	CHI; 31	IND; 4	POC; 15	GLN; 5	MCH; 20	BRI; 4	ATL; 10	RCH; 13	NHA; 9	DOV; 13	KAN; 3	CAL; 20	CLT; 16	MAR; 25	TAL; 4	TEX; 8	PHO; 14	HOM; 14	7th	6292
2010	Greg Biffle	16	Ford	DAY; 3	CAL; 10	LVS; 10	ATL; 8	BRI; 4	MAR; 10	PHO; 22	TEX; 10	TAL; 17	RCH; 22	DAR; 22	DOV; 6	CLT; 32	POC; 28	MCH; 9	SON; 7	NHA; 16	DAY; 20	CHI; 35	IND; 3	POC; 1	GLN; 24	MCH; 4	BRI; 8	ATL; 36	RCH; 32	NHA; 17	DOV; 19	KAN; 1	CAL; 41	CLT; 5	MAR; 33	TAL; 19	TEX; 5	PHO; 4	HOM; 10	6th	6247
2011	Greg Biffle	16	Ford	DAY; 35	PHO; 20	LVS; 28	BRI; 8	CAL; 11	MAR; 21	TEX; 4	TAL; 7	RCH; 15	DAR; 8	DOV; 19	CLT; 13	KAN; 10	POC; 27	MCH; 15	SON; 23	DAY; 18	KEN; 21	NHA; 18	IND; 7	POC; 8	GLN; 31	MCH; 20	BRI; 31	ATL; 12	RCH; 13	CHI; 26	NHA; 3	DOV; 27	KAN; 8	CLT; 15	TAL; 14	MAR; 15	TEX; 5	PHO; 13	HOM; 35	16th	997
2012	Greg Biffle	16	Ford	DAY; 3	PHO; 3	LVS; 3	BRI; 13	CAL; 6	MAR; 13	TEX; 1	KAN; 5	RCH; 18	TAL; 5	DAR; 12	CLT; 4	DOV; 11	POC; 24	MCH; 4	SON; 7	KEN; 21	DAY; 21	NHA; 9	IND; 3	POC; 15	GLN; 6	MCH; 1	BRI; 19	ATL; 15	RCH; 9	CHI; 13	NHA; 18	DOV; 16	TAL; 6	CLT; 4	KAN; 27	MAR; 10	TEX; 10	PHO; 7	HOM; 5	5th	2332
2013	Greg Biffle	16	Ford	DAY; 6	PHO; 17	LVS; 17	BRI; 11	CAL; 6	MAR; 9	TEX; 4	KAN; 19	RCH; 36	TAL; 36	DAR; 13	CLT; 31	DOV; 15	POC; 2	MCH; 1	SON; 8	KEN; 34	DAY; 17	NHA; 15	IND; 24	POC; 10	GLN; 16	MCH; 9	BRI; 9	ATL; 15	RCH; 12	CHI; 16	NHA; 3	DOV; 9	KAN; 13	CLT; 16	TAL; 11	MAR; 9	TEX; 12	PHO; 13	HOM; 24	9th	2321
2014	Greg Biffle	16	Ford	DAY; 8	PHO; 17	LVS; 22	BRI; 12	CAL; 40	MAR; 18	TEX; 6	DAR; 5	RCH; 15	TAL; 2*	KAN; 16	CLT; 21	DOV; 38	POC; 16	MCH; 20	SON; 9	KEN; 14	DAY; 29	NHA; 15	IND; 13	POC; 5	GLN; 8	MCH; 10	BRI; 10	ATL; 10	RCH; 19	CHI; 23	NHA; 16	DOV; 21	KAN; 15	CLT; 18	TAL; 25	MAR; 13	TEX; 13	PHO; 9	HOM; 41	14th	2247
2015	Greg Biffle	16	Ford	DAY; 10	ATL; 25	LVS; 14	PHO; 27	CAL; 32	MAR; 19	TEX; 17	BRI; 30	RCH; 21	TAL; 37	KAN; 12	CLT; 2	DOV; 17	POC; 12	MCH; 36	SON; 27	DAY; 20	KEN; 16	NHA; 27	IND; 19	POC; 5	GLN; 14	MCH; 23	BRI; 25	DAR; 18	RCH; 31	CHI; 21	NHA; 4	DOV; 13	CLT; 24	KAN; 17	TAL; 20	MAR; 26	TEX; 19	PHO; 25	HOM; 16	20th	869
2016	Greg Biffle	16	Ford	DAY; 34	ATL; 13	LVS; 20	PHO; 21	CAL; 37	MAR; 12	TEX; 39	BRI; 12	RCH; 14	TAL; 20	KAN; 27	DOV; 29	CLT; 11	POC; 26	MCH; 19	SON; 18	DAY; 8	KEN; 6	NHA; 5	IND; 39	POC; 25	GLN; 39	BRI; 16	MCH; 11	DAR; 36	RCH; 23	CHI; 26	NHA; 33	DOV; 18	CLT; 35	KAN; 25	TAL; 15	MAR; 13	TEX; 18	PHO; 16	HOM; 17	24th	691

=== Car No. 17 history ===
Matt Kenseth (1999–2012)

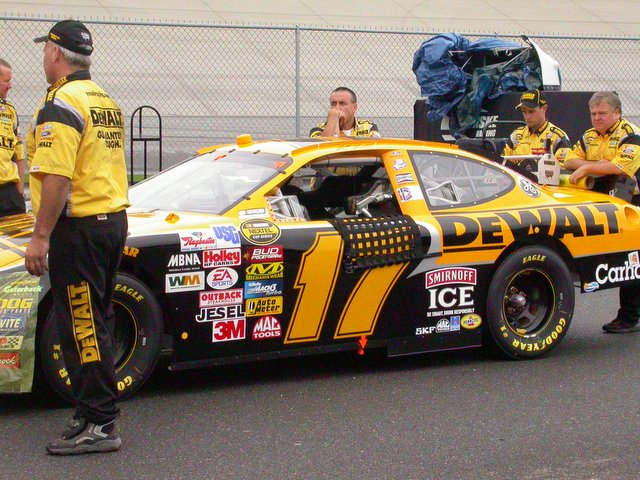
2004 No. 17 DeWalt Tools Ford Taurus

In 1999, Roush fielded the No. 17 with Matt Kenseth as the driver, DeWalt Tools as the sponsor, and Robbie Reiser as crew chief. This was the same combination as was run on Reiser's own Busch Grand National team. Premiering at the summer Michigan race in 1999, Kenseth finished 14th. A fourth-place finish one month later at Dover proved Kenseth was ready for Cup.

In 2000, Kenseth and the No. 17 started every race, won the Coca-Cola 600, and defeated favorite Dale Earnhardt Jr. for Rookie of the Year honors. The 2001 season saw Kenseth finish 13th in points, winless and with only nine top ten finishes. However, the team saw marked improvement the next year, as Kenseth won a season high five races in 2002, ultimately reaching an eighth-place finish in points.

While winning only once in 2003, at Las Vegas, Kenseth performed remarkably consistently to win the final Winston Cup Championship by 90 points, earning Jack Roush his first Cup championship.

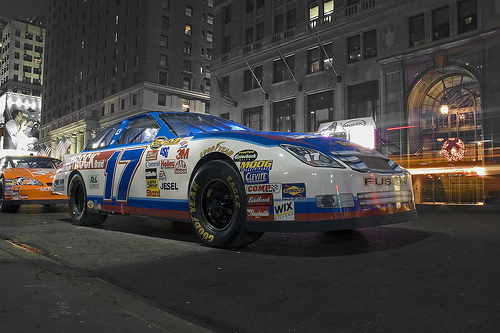
Kenseth's 2006 USG Sheetrock car, taken in New York City for the awards banquet.

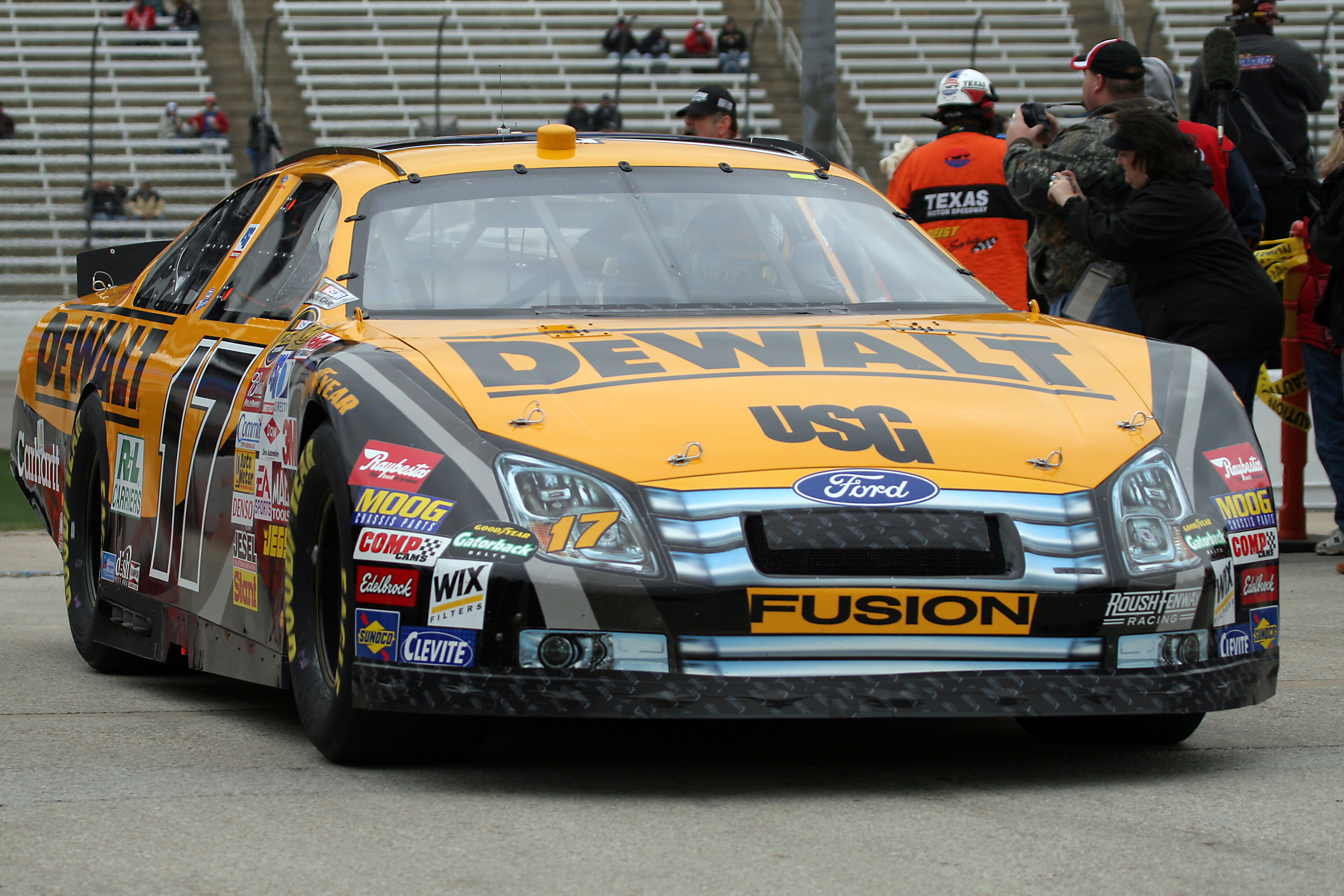
Kenseth's DeWalt Ford in 2007.

The team continued to perform in 2004, winning two races, making the Chase for the Nextel Cup, and finishing eighth in points. In 2005, Kenseth finished seventh in points after experiencing a disappointing beginning to the season. However, the second half of the year brought a resurgence of success for the car, as a win at Bristol helped the team make its second consecutive Chase for the Nextel Cup. In 2006, Kenseth won four races, and finished second to Jimmie Johnson in the championship standings. Kenseth won the first two races of the 2009 season winning Jack Roush his first Daytona 500. Due to the slumping economy, however, Kenseth's longtime sponsor DeWalt informed Roush Fenway Racing on July 23, 2009, that they would no longer be sponsoring the No. 17 team for the 2010 season. Crown Royal announced they would move to the No. 17 in 2010 for 35 races as Valvoline sponsored the remaining 3.

For 2011, Kenseth returned to victory lane at Texas, Dover and Charlotte. However, Crown Royal announced that they would not return to the No. 17 team, instead focusing their NASCAR efforts on the Brickyard 400 sponsorship. Despite this, Kenseth finished fourth in points.

In 2012, Kenseth's primary sponsorship was split between Best Buy, Zest Soap, and Fifth Third Bank, although the team was still forced to run several races unsponsored. Kenseth started the year strong by winning the Gatorade Duel Qualifying Race and the 2012 Daytona 500, which was also Jack Roush's 300th victory in NASCAR and his second Daytona 500 victory. It was later announced that Kenseth was leaving Roush Fenway Racing after the season, even though he had no team he was going to. Kenseth made the Chase and won two of the ten Chase races (Talladega and Kansas), finishing seventh in the standings. Following the season, Kenseth joined Joe Gibbs Racing in 2013.

Ricky Stenhouse Jr. (2013–2019)

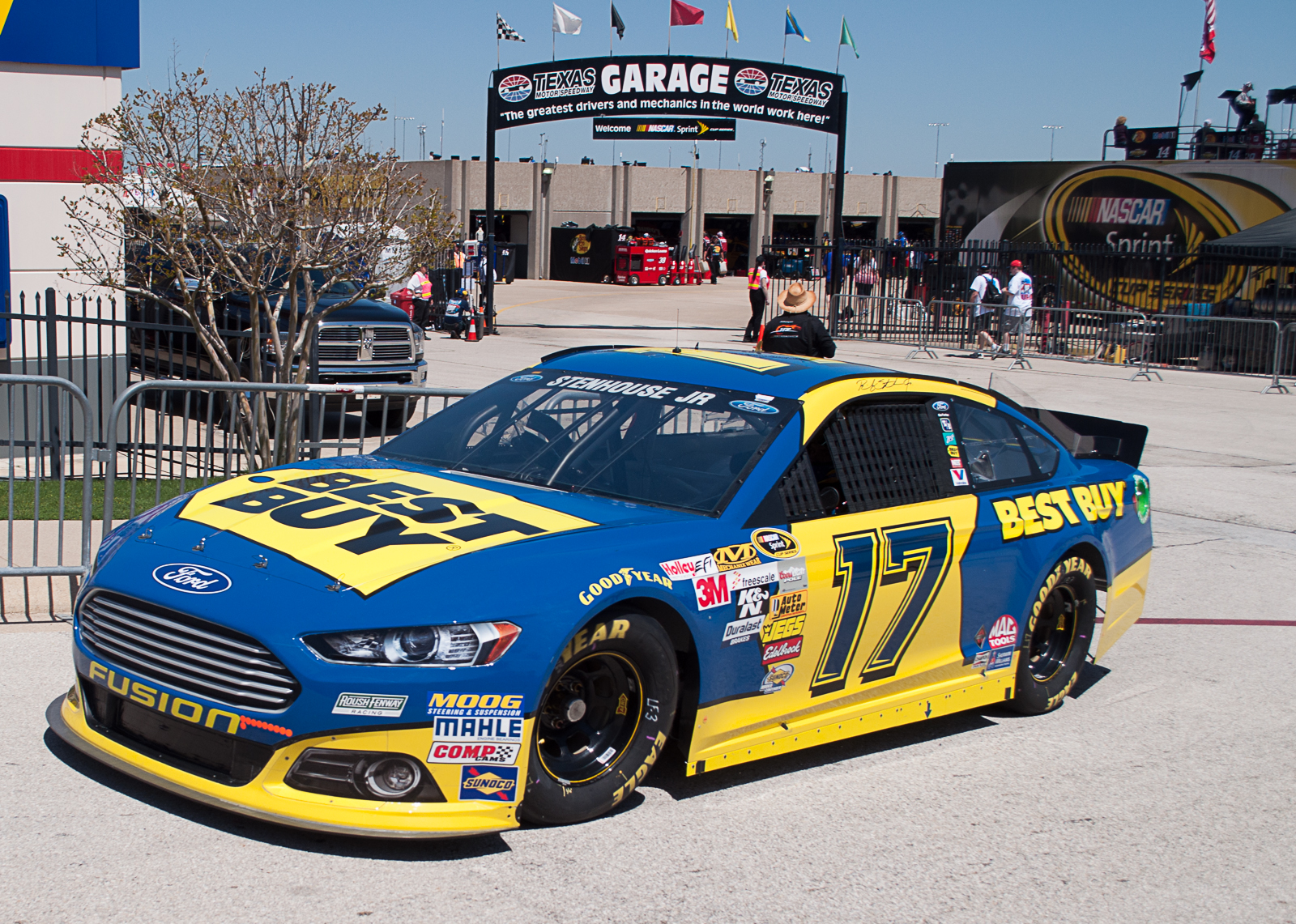
Ricky Stenhouse Jr. in the No. 17 at Texas in 2013.

In 2013, Kenseth was replaced by rookie Ricky Stenhouse Jr. Stenhouse inherited Kenseth's sponsorship, while adding primary support from Nationwide Insurance to cover the unfilled races. Stenhouse had shown promise, as he finished 12th at the 2013 Daytona 500. Through the first 17 points races, his highest finish had been 11th. He also finished second in the Sprint Showdown. Stenhouse's best finish of the entire season was a third-place finish at Talladega in October.

In 2014, the team's Best Buy sponsorship was replaced by Cargill, while keeping Zest, Fifth-Third and Nationwide. Stenhouse struggled along with the rest of the Roush program. He spend a majority of the summer working with new crew chief Mike Kelley trying to improve the chemistry of the team. The No. 60 suffered through a dismal season, with Stenhouse recording two top tens, while failing to qualify once. The team finished 28th in owner points.

In 2015, Nationwide Insurance moved to Hendrick Motorsports to sponsor Dale Earnhardt Jr. Zest, Cargill and Fifth-Third returned to the No. 17, with primary sponsorship anchored by Fastenal, moving from Roush's No. 99 car. The team recorded three top tens, and ended the season 25th in owner and driver points. Stenhouse improved in 2016, getting four top fives and six top tens. He gained four positions in points up to 21st, his best run since his rookie year in 2013, performing better than his teammates.

In 2017, Stenhouse scored his first career victory at the spring Talladega race. He then scored his second win at the 2017 Coke Zero 400 at Daytona. Stenhouse made the Playoffs and finished 13th in points. Stenhouse struggled through the 2018 season, failing to win a race and scoring only three top-fives and five top-10s while finishing 18th in the standings.

On May 29, 2019, it was announced that NOS Energy Drink will sponsor the No. 17 as a primary at Michigan and as an associate for the rest of the season. NOS previously sponsored Stenhouse during his championship run in the 2012 NASCAR Nationwide Series and in the Cup Series from 2013 to 2015.

Chris Buescher (2020–present)

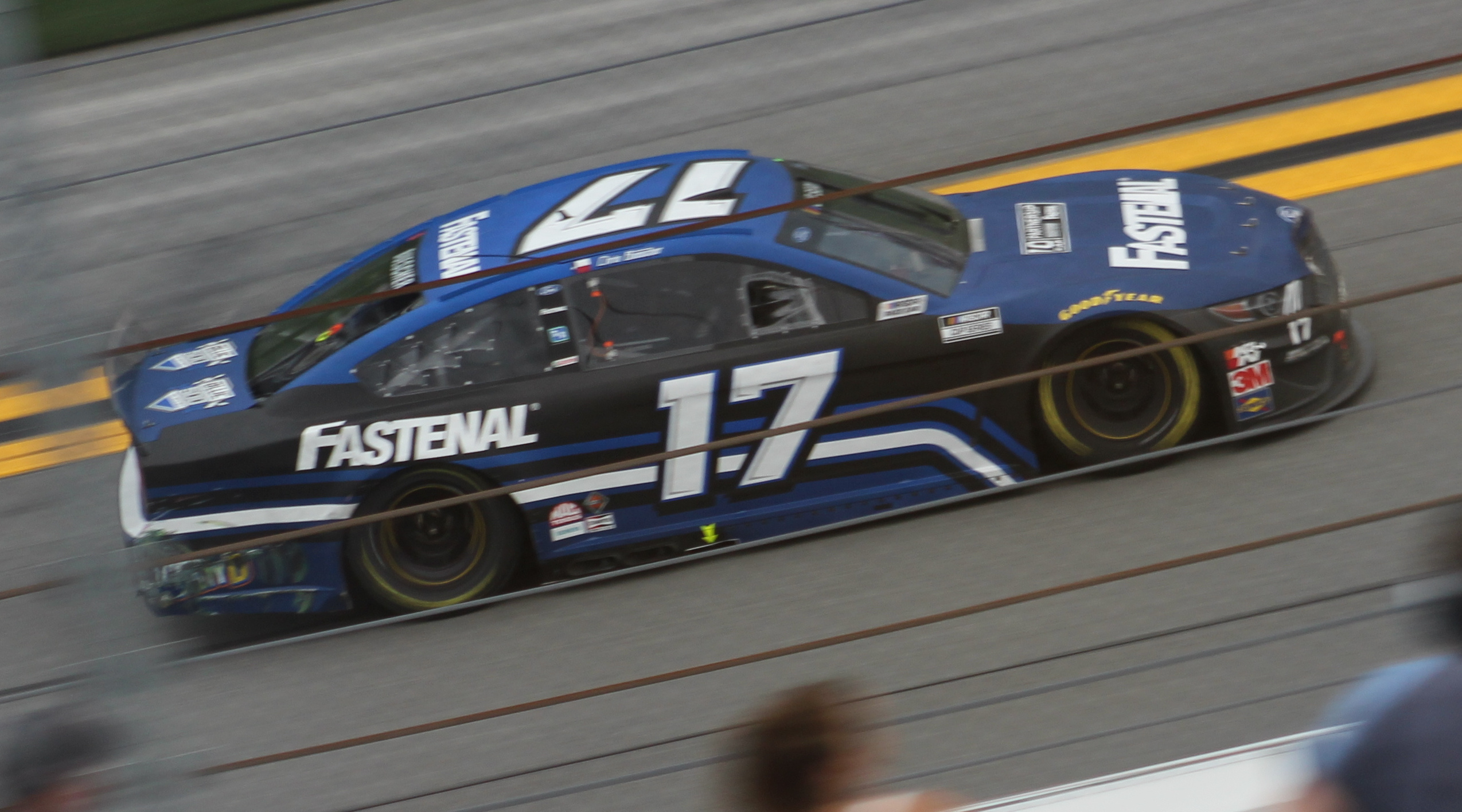
Chris Buescher in the No. 17 at Daytona in 2020.

On September 25, Roush Fenway Racing announced that they will part ways with Stenhouse at the end of the season, with Chris Buescher replacing him in the 2020 season.

Buescher displayed more consistency in his finishes during the 2021 season, staying within the top-20 in the points standings. He finished second at the 2021 Coke Zero Sugar 400 at Daytona, but was disqualified when his car failed post-race inspection due to a rear sub-frame assembly violation.

Buescher started the 2022 season with a 16th-place finish at the 2022 Daytona 500. He also scored top-10 finishes at Phoenix, Atlanta, and Dover, where he recorded his first career Cup Series pole. Buescher was forced to miss Gateway after testing positive for COVID-19; he was substituted with Zane Smith. A week later, Buescher returned to the No. 17 and finished second to Daniel Suárez at Sonoma. On June 28, crew chief Scott Graves was suspended for four races due to a tire and wheel loss at Nashville. Despite not making the playoffs, Buescher managed to score his second career win at the Bristol night race, snapping a 222 race winless streak and a five-year drought for the No. 17.

Buescher began the 2023 season with a fourth place finish at the 2023 Daytona 500. He held off Denny Hamlin to win at Richmond to make his first playoff appearance since 2016. Buescher would go back-to-back for the first time in his career and win the next week's race at Michigan, the first time RFK Racing had won two consecutive races since Carl Edwards won the final two races of the 2010 season. He then scored his third win at the Daytona night race.

Buescher started the 2024 season with an 18th place finish at the 2024 Daytona 500. At Kansas, Buesher finished second to Kyle Larson by 0.001 seconds - the closest finish in NASCAR Cup Series history. Despite missing the playoffs, Buescher won at Watkins Glen after Shane van Gisbergen brushed the wall near the Bus Stop on the final lap.

Buescher started the 2025 season with a 10th place finish at the 2025 Daytona 500. Following the Kansas race, the No. 17 car was issued an L1 penalty after R&D discovered the reinforcement behind the front bumper foam exceeded two inches. As a result, the team was docked 60 owner and driver points, 5 playoff points, and fined US$75,000, and Graves was suspended for two races.

Buescher started the 2026 season with a seventh-place finish at the 2026 Daytona 500. Buescher signed a multi-year extension with RFK Racing on June 16.

==== Car No. 17 results ====
Year	Driver	No.	Make	1	2	3	4	5	6	7	8	9	10	11	12	13	14	15	16	17	18	19	20	21	22	23	24	25	26	27	28	29	30	31	32	33	34	35	36	Owners	Pts
1999	Matt Kenseth	17	Ford	DAY	CAR	LVS	ATL	DAR	TEX	BRI	MAR	TAL	CAL	RCH	CLT	DOV	MCH	POC	SON	DAY	NHA	POC	IND	GLN	MCH; 14	BRI	DAR; 37	RCH	NHA	DOV; 4	MAR	CLT; 40	TAL	CAR; 35	PHO	HOM	ATL			48th	434
2000	Matt Kenseth	17	Ford	DAY; 10	CAR; 37	LVS; 14	ATL; 40	DAR; 6	BRI; 12	TEX; 31	MAR; 21	TAL; 18	CAL; 3*	RCH; 15	CLT; 1	DOV; 2	MCH; 17	POC; 14	SON; 32	DAY; 20	NHA; 19	POC; 5	IND; 26	GLN; 10	MCH; 8	BRI; 39	DAR; 33	RCH; 32	NHA; 17	DOV; 12	MAR; 34	CLT; 9	TAL; 10	CAR; 25	PHO; 42	HOM; 21	ATL; 9			14th	3711
2001	Matt Kenseth	17	Ford	DAY; 21	CAR; 28	LVS; 17	ATL; 37	DAR; 19	BRI; 14	TEX; 20	MAR; 6	TAL; 19	CAL; 17	RCH; 8	CLT; 18	DOV; 16	MCH; 15	POC; 6	SON; 21	DAY; 16	CHI; 7	NHA; 16	POC; 14	IND; 42	GLN; 23	MCH; 4	BRI; 33	DAR; 23	RCH; 35	DOV; 29	KAN; 32	CLT; 12	MAR; 36	TAL; 4	PHO; 4	CAR; 10	HOM; 27	ATL; 17	NHA; 4	13th	3982
2002	Matt Kenseth	17	Ford	DAY; 33	CAR; 1*	LVS; 14	ATL; 4	DAR; 8	BRI; 6	TEX; 1	MAR; 2	TAL; 30	CAL; 20	RCH; 6	CLT; 2	DOV; 40	POC; 35	MCH; 1	SON; 39	DAY; 30	CHI; 14	NHA; 33	POC; 8	IND; 3	GLN; 33	MCH; 11	BRI; 5	DAR; 37	RCH; 1	NHA; 10	DOV; 4	KAN; 7	TAL; 14	CLT; 34	MAR; 19	ATL; 9	CAR; 8	PHO; 1	HOM; 40	8th	4432
2003	Matt Kenseth	17	Ford	DAY; 20	CAR; 3	LVS; 1	ATL; 4	DAR; 8	BRI; 2	TEX; 6	TAL; 9	MAR; 22	CAL; 9	RCH; 7	CLT; 2*	DOV; 7	POC; 3	MCH; 4	SON; 14	DAY; 6	CHI; 12	NHA; 3	POC; 13	IND; 2	GLN; 8	MCH; 9	BRI; 4	DAR; 14	RCH; 7	NHA; 7	DOV; 9	TAL; 33	KAN; 36	CLT; 8	MAR; 13	ATL; 11	PHO; 6	CAR; 4	HOM; 43	1st	5022
2004	Matt Kenseth	17	Ford	DAY; 9	CAR; 1*	LVS; 1*	ATL; 6	DAR; 31	BRI; 5	TEX; 16	MAR; 8	TAL; 42	CAL; 4	RCH; 5	CLT; 3	DOV; 22	POC; 21	MCH; 7	SON; 20	DAY; 39	CHI; 12	NHA; 4	POC; 8	IND; 16	GLN; 9	MCH; 8	BRI; 9	CAL; 22	RCH; 28	NHA; 2	DOV; 32	TAL; 14	KAN; 17	CLT; 11	MAR; 16	ATL; 41	PHO; 36	DAR; 20	HOM; 19	8th	6069
2005	Matt Kenseth	17	Ford	DAY; 42	CAL; 26	LVS; 8	ATL; 31	BRI; 16	MAR; 11	TEX; 18	PHO; 42	TAL; 11	DAR; 26	RCH; 12	CLT; 37	DOV; 7	POC; 32	MCH; 4	SON; 11	DAY; 9	CHI; 2*	NHA; 10	POC; 36	IND; 5	GLN; 18	MCH; 3	BRI; 1*	CAL; 7	RCH; 2	NHA; 3	DOV; 35	TAL; 3	KAN; 5	CLT; 26	MAR; 12	ATL; 5	TEX; 3*	PHO; 32	HOM; 3	7th	6352
2006	Matt Kenseth	17	Ford	DAY; 15	CAL; 1	LVS; 2*	ATL; 13	BRI; 3	MAR; 24	TEX; 2	PHO; 3	TAL; 6	RCH; 38	DAR; 3	CLT; 5	DOV; 1	POC; 5	MCH; 13	SON; 17	DAY; 5	CHI; 22*	NHA; 14	POC; 14	IND; 2	GLN; 21	MCH; 1*	BRI; 1	CAL; 7	RCH; 8	NHA; 10	DOV; 10*	KAN; 23	TAL; 4	CLT; 14	MAR; 11	ATL; 4	TEX; 12	PHO; 13	HOM; 6	2nd	6419
2007	Matt Kenseth	17	Ford	DAY; 27	CAL; 1*	LVS; 4	ATL; 3	BRI; 11	MAR; 10	TEX; 2	PHO; 5	TAL; 14	RCH; 10	DAR; 7	CLT; 12	DOV; 5	POC; 9	MCH; 42	SON; 34	NHA; 9	DAY; 8	CHI; 2	IND; 10	POC; 14	GLN; 12	MCH; 4	BRI; 39	CAL; 7	RCH; 14	NHA; 7	DOV; 35*	KAN; 35	TAL; 26	CLT; 34	MAR; 5	ATL; 4	TEX; 2	PHO; 3*	HOM; 1*	4th	6298
2008	Matt Kenseth	17	Ford	DAY; 36	CAL; 5	LVS; 20	ATL; 8	BRI; 10	MAR; 30	TEX; 9	PHO; 38	TAL; 41	RCH; 38	DAR; 6	CLT; 7	DOV; 4	POC; 7	MCH; 3	SON; 8	NHA; 18	DAY; 3	CHI; 7	IND; 38	POC; 11	GLN; 12	MCH; 5	BRI; 9	CAL; 5	RCH; 39	NHA; 40	DOV; 2*	KAN; 5	TAL; 26	CLT; 41	MAR; 8	ATL; 4*	TEX; 9	PHO; 15	HOM; 25	11th	6184
2009	Matt Kenseth	17	Ford	DAY; 1	CAL; 1*	LVS; 43	ATL; 12	BRI; 33	MAR; 23	TEX; 5	PHO; 27	TAL; 17	RCH; 13	DAR; 10	CLT; 10	DOV; 4	POC; 16	MCH; 20	SON; 18	NHA; 22	DAY; 8	CHI; 23	IND; 10	POC; 11	GLN; 14	MCH; 14	BRI; 10	ATL; 12	RCH; 25	NHA; 23	DOV; 3	KAN; 39	CAL; 13	CLT; 2	MAR; 14	TAL; 24	TEX; 3	PHO; 18	HOM; 13	14th	4389
2010	Matt Kenseth	17	Ford	DAY; 8	CAL; 7	LVS; 5	ATL; 2	BRI; 5	MAR; 18	PHO; 6	TEX; 20	TAL; 28	RCH; 13	DAR; 13	DOV; 3	CLT; 10	POC; 17	MCH; 14	SON; 30	NHA; 17	DAY; 15	CHI; 13	IND; 12	POC; 18	GLN; 13	MCH; 5	BRI; 10	ATL; 11	RCH; 14	NHA; 23	DOV; 18	KAN; 7	CAL; 30	CLT; 6	MAR; 15	TAL; 16	TEX; 2	PHO; 7	HOM; 9	5th	6294
2011	Matt Kenseth	17	Ford	DAY; 34	PHO; 12	LVS; 11	BRI; 4	CAL; 4	MAR; 6	TEX; 1*	TAL; 36	RCH; 21	DAR; 25	DOV; 1	CLT; 14*	KAN; 6	POC; 8	MCH; 2	SON; 14	DAY; 2	KEN; 6	NHA; 20	IND; 5	POC; 16	GLN; 17	MCH; 10	BRI; 6	ATL; 9	RCH; 23	CHI; 21	NHA; 6	DOV; 5	KAN; 4	CLT; 1	TAL; 18	MAR; 31	TEX; 4	PHO; 34	HOM; 4	4th	2330
2012	Matt Kenseth	17	Ford	DAY; 1	PHO; 13	LVS; 22	BRI; 2	CAL; 16	MAR; 4	TEX; 5	KAN; 4	RCH; 11	TAL; 3*	DAR; 6	CLT; 10	DOV; 3	POC; 7	MCH; 3	SON; 13	KEN; 7	DAY; 3*	NHA; 13	IND; 35	POC; 23	GLN; 8	MCH; 17	BRI; 25	ATL; 9	RCH; 5	CHI; 18	NHA; 13	DOV; 35	TAL; 1	CLT; 14	KAN; 1*	MAR; 14	TEX; 4	PHO; 14	HOM; 18	7th	2324
2013	Ricky Stenhouse Jr.	17	Ford	DAY; 12	PHO; 16	LVS; 18	BRI; 16	CAL; 20	MAR; 25	TEX; 40	KAN; 11	RCH; 16	TAL; 13	DAR; 18	CLT; 14	DOV; 13	POC; 26	MCH; 16	SON; 27	KEN; 17	DAY; 11	NHA; 34	IND; 25	POC; 34	GLN; 18	MCH; 19	BRI; 18	ATL; 16	RCH; 10	CHI; 8	NHA; 24	DOV; 17	KAN; 30	CLT; 13	TAL; 3	MAR; 31	TEX; 16	PHO; 12	HOM; 22	19th	909
2014	Ricky Stenhouse Jr.	17	Ford	DAY; 7	PHO; 18	LVS; 27	BRI; 2	CAL; 34	MAR; 40	TEX; 26	DAR; 20	RCH; 38	TAL; 10	KAN; 22	CLT; 26	DOV; 41	POC; 15	MCH; 27	SON; 31	KEN; 25	DAY; 41	NHA; 9	IND; 24	POC; 18	GLN; 20	MCH; 15	BRI; 6	ATL; 20	RCH; 26	CHI; 17	NHA; 39	DOV; 19	KAN; 19	CLT; 24	TAL; DNQ	MAR; 15	TEX; 23	PHO; 17	HOM; 22	27th	757
2015	Ricky Stenhouse Jr.	17	Ford	DAY; 29	ATL; 36	LVS; 29	PHO; 12	CAL; 15	MAR; 40	TEX; 15	BRI; 4	RCH; 28	TAL; 26	KAN; 24	CLT; 37	DOV; 37	POC; 42	MCH; 25	SON; 20	DAY; 19	KEN; 11	NHA; 17	IND; 35	POC; 41	GLN; 34	MCH; 26	BRI; 21	DAR; 38	RCH; 16	CHI; 18	NHA; 13	DOV; 8	CLT; 14	KAN; 13	TAL; 9	MAR; 39	TEX; 21	PHO; 41	HOM; 22	25th	712
2016	Ricky Stenhouse Jr.	17	Ford	DAY; 22	ATL; 10	LVS; 12	PHO; 37	CAL; 5	MAR; 32	TEX; 16	BRI; 16	RCH; 26	TAL; 16	KAN; 13	DOV; 14	CLT; 15	POC; 15	MCH; 29	SON; 26	DAY; 5	KEN; 40	NHA; 10	IND; 12	POC; 18	GLN; 38	BRI; 2	MCH; 27	DAR; 18	RCH; 18	CHI; 25	NHA; 24	DOV; 11	CLT; 20	KAN; 19	TAL; 5	MAR; 40	TEX; 16	PHO; 23	HOM; 30	22nd	772
2017	Ricky Stenhouse Jr.	17	Ford	DAY; 31	ATL; 13	LVS; 33	PHO; 4	CAL; 22	MAR; 10	TEX; 14	BRI; 9	RCH; 4	TAL; 1	KAN; 11	CLT; 15	DOV; 39	POC; 11	MCH; 8	SON; 38	DAY; 1	KEN; 14	NHA; 14	IND; 35	POC; 16	GLN; 20	MCH; 18	BRI; 14	DAR; 29	RCH; 19	CHI; 25	NHA; 15	DOV; 19	CLT; 13	TAL; 26	KAN; 29	MAR; 10	TEX; 12	PHO; 8	HOM; 15	13th	2222
2018	Ricky Stenhouse Jr.	17	Ford	DAY; 29	ATL; 16	LVS; 14	PHO; 23	CAL; 18	MAR; 37	TEX; 25	BRI; 4	RCH; 23	TAL; 5	DOV; 15	KAN; 11	CLT; 10	POC; 14	MCH; 29	SON; 18	CHI; 16	DAY; 17	KEN; 26	NHA; 30	POC; 22	GLN; 16	MCH; 18	BRI; 24	DAR; 12	IND; 34	LVS; 30	RCH; 13	CLT; 37	DOV; 9	TAL; 3	KAN; 20	MAR; 19	TEX; 11	PHO; 33	HOM; 16	18th	701
2019	Ricky Stenhouse Jr.	17	Ford	DAY; 13	ATL; 18	LVS; 6	PHO; 13	CAL; 14	MAR; 25	TEX; 16	BRI; 33	RCH; 16	TAL; 25	DOV; 33	KAN; 11	CLT; 5	POC; 32	MCH; 19	SON; 21	CHI; 12	DAY; 24	KEN; 12	NHA; 36	POC; 21	GLN; 15	MCH; 28	BRI; 33	DAR; 33	IND; 31	LVS; 26	RCH; 15	CLT; 17	DOV; 16	TAL; 9	KAN; 16	MAR; 15	TEX; 40	PHO; 19	HOM; 19	23rd	679
2020	Chris Buescher	17	Ford	DAY; 3	LVS; 14	CAL; 16	PHO; 17	DAR; 32	DAR; 23	CLT; 10	CLT; 22	BRI; 23	ATL; 22	MAR; 13	HOM; 23	TAL; 6	POC; 10	POC; 36	IND; 31	KEN; 20	TEX; 19	KAN; 33	NHA; 25	MCH; 20	MCH; 20	DAY; 5	DOV; 16	DOV; 14	DAY; 9	DAR; 26	RCH; 24	BRI; 8	LVS; 9	TAL; 22	CLT; 20	KAN; 21	TEX; 34	MAR; 38	PHO; 20	21st	645
2021	Chris Buescher	17	Ford	DAY; 31	DAY; 11	HOM; 19	LVS; 14	PHO; 18	ATL; 7	BRI; 14	MAR; 13	RCH; 25	TAL; 21	KAN; 8	DAR; 9	DOV; 17	COA; 13	CLT; 8	SON; 16	NSH; 36	POC; 20	POC; 19	ROA; 18	ATL; 16	NHA; 29	GLN; 17	IND; 12	MCH; 15	DAY; 40	DAR; 9	RCH; 24	BRI; 23	LVS; 25	TAL; 6	CLT; 3	TEX; 21	KAN; 12	MAR; 9	PHO; 25	19th	771
2022	Chris Buescher	17	Ford	DAY; 16	CAL; 35	LVS; 18	PHO; 10	ATL; 7	COA; 21	RCH; 15	MAR; 15	BRI; 15	TAL; 38	DOV; 8	DAR; 16	KAN; 27	CLT; 26		SON; 2	NSH; 30	ROA; 6	ATL; 33	NHA; 17	POC; 29	IND; 10	MCH; 16	RCH; 3	GLN; 9	DAY; 27	DAR; 26	KAN; 15	BRI; 1*	TEX; 30	TAL; 25	CLT; 6	LVS; 15	HOM; 13	MAR; 24	PHO; 21	21st	747
2022	Zane Smith	17	Ford															GTW; 17																						21st	747
2023	Chris Buescher	17	Ford	DAY; 4	CAL; 13	LVS; 21	PHO; 15	ATL; 35	COA; 8	RCH; 30	BRD; 18	MAR; 14	TAL; 3	DOV; 9	KAN; 17	DAR; 10	CLT; 8	GTW; 12	SON; 4	NSH; 18	CSC; 10	ATL; 15	NHA; 15	POC; 18	RCH; 1	MCH; 1*	IND; 11	GLN; 7	DAY; 1	DAR; 3	KAN; 27	BRI; 4	TEX; 14	TAL; 19	ROV; 7	LVS; 11	HOM; 21	MAR; 8	PHO; 5	7th	2310
2024	Chris Buescher	17	Ford	DAY; 18	ATL; 9	LVS; 37	PHO; 2	BRI; 7	COA; 8	RCH; 9	MAR; 15	TEX; 15	TAL; 25	DOV; 17	KAN; 2	DAR; 30	CLT; 23	GTW; 14	SON; 3	IOW; 18	NHA; 5	NSH; 5	CSC; 20	POC; 11	IND; 22	RCH; 18	MCH; 6	DAY; 10	DAR; 6	ATL; 36	GLN; 1	BRI; 14	KAN; 11	TAL; 17	ROV; 17	LVS; 10	HOM; 15	MAR; 30	PHO; 9	17th	930
2025	Chris Buescher	17	Ford	DAY; 10	ATL; 30	COA; 7	PHO; 5	LVS; 13	HOM; 6	MAR; 24	DAR; 6	BRI; 25	TAL; 34	TEX; 18	KAN; 8	CLT; 22	NSH; 14	MCH; 2	MXC; 10	POC; 4	ATL; 9	CSC; 18	SON; 16	DOV; 9	IND; 14	IOW; 22	GLN; 3	RCH; 30	DAY; 7	DAR; 10	GTW; 9	BRI; 11	NHA; 18	KAN; 15	ROV; 4	LVS; 12	TAL; 30	MAR; 29	PHO; 12	17th	889
2026	Chris Buescher	17	Ford	DAY; 7	ATL; 15	COA; 24	PHO; 14	LVS; 6	DAR; 9	MAR; 19	BRI; 13	KAN; 10	TAL; 2	TEX; 5	GLN; 12	CLT; 30	NSH; 29	MCH; 9	POC; 7	COR; 6	SON; 19	CHI; 19	ATL; 10	NWS; 20	IND; 11	IOW; 13	RCH; 21	NHA; 18	DAY; 40	DAR; 20	GTW; 27	BRI; 13	KAN; 23	LVS; 13	CLT; 10	PHO; 22	TAL; 32*	MAR; 24	HOM; 24	16th	2212
2027	Chris Buescher	17	Ford	DAY	ATL	COA	PHO	LVS	DAR	BRI	MAR	TAL	TEX	KAN	DOV	CLT	NSH	POC	MCH	CHI	IOW	SON	ATL	IND	COR	BRI	GTW	DAY	DAR	RCH	GLN	NHA	KAN	LVS	CLT	PHO	TAL	MAR	HOM		

=== Car No. 26 history ===
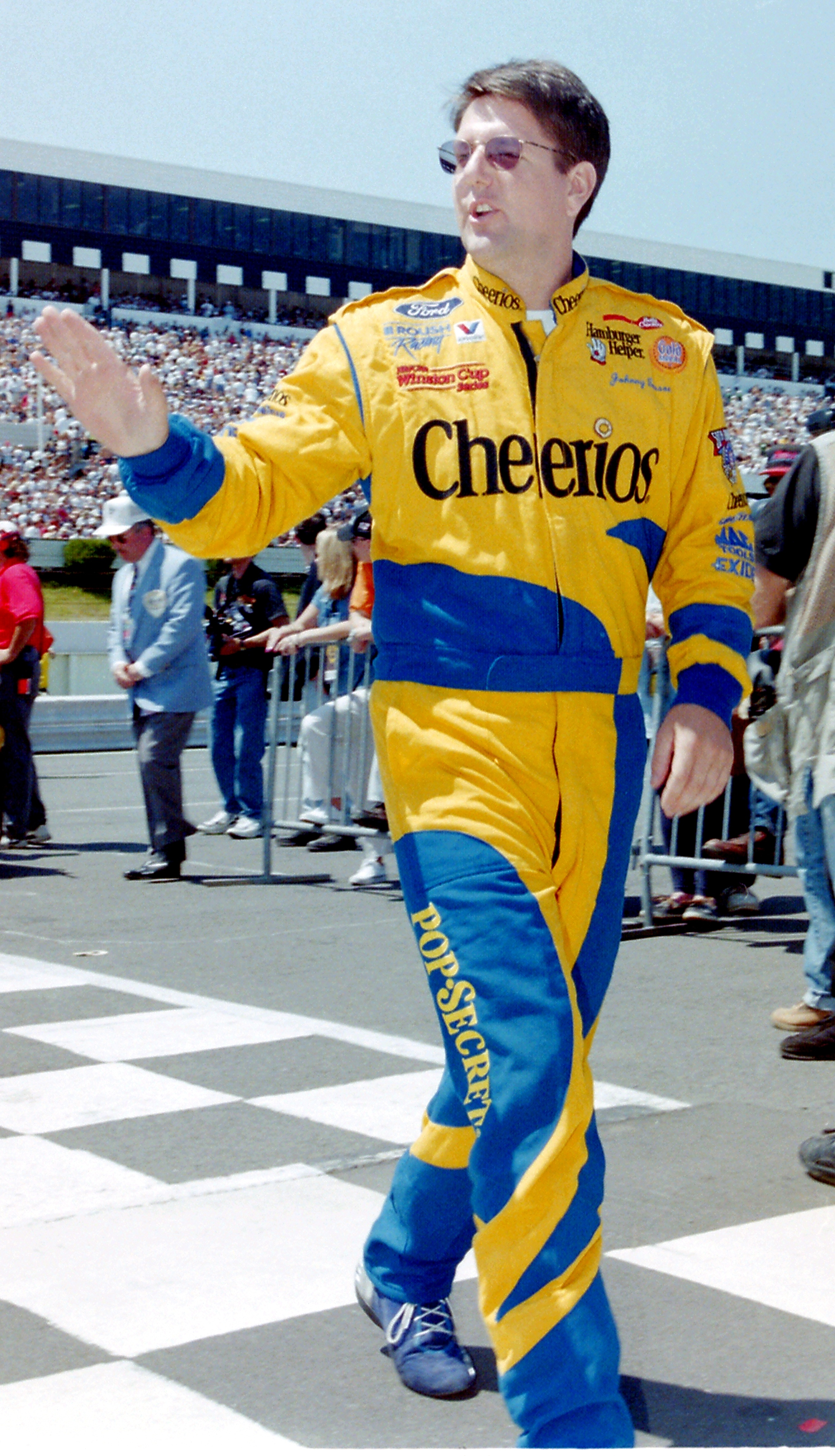
Johnny Benson in 1998.

Johnny Benson (1998–1999)

The 26 car debuted in 1998 as Roush's first attempt at a fifth NASCAR Cup Series team (6, 16, 26, 97, 99). The team hired third-year driver Johnny Benson Jr., buying out his contract from Bahari Racing, and signed General Mills's Cheerios brand as its sponsor. After failing to qualify at Daytona, the No. 26 debuted at North Carolina, where Benson finished 30th in the car. Benson ended the 1998 season with three top fives, ten top tens, and earned 20th place in the championship points. In 1999, the No. 26 car experienced a very disappointing year. After mustering only two top tens finishes and dropping eight spots in points, Benson was given his release from the team to drive for Tyler Jet Motorsports. General Mills and Cheerios would also leave Roush Racing to replace STP as the primary sponsor of the famed No. 43 of Petty Enterprises with driver John Andretti. Without a driver or sponsor the team ceased operations.

Jamie McMurray (2006–2009)

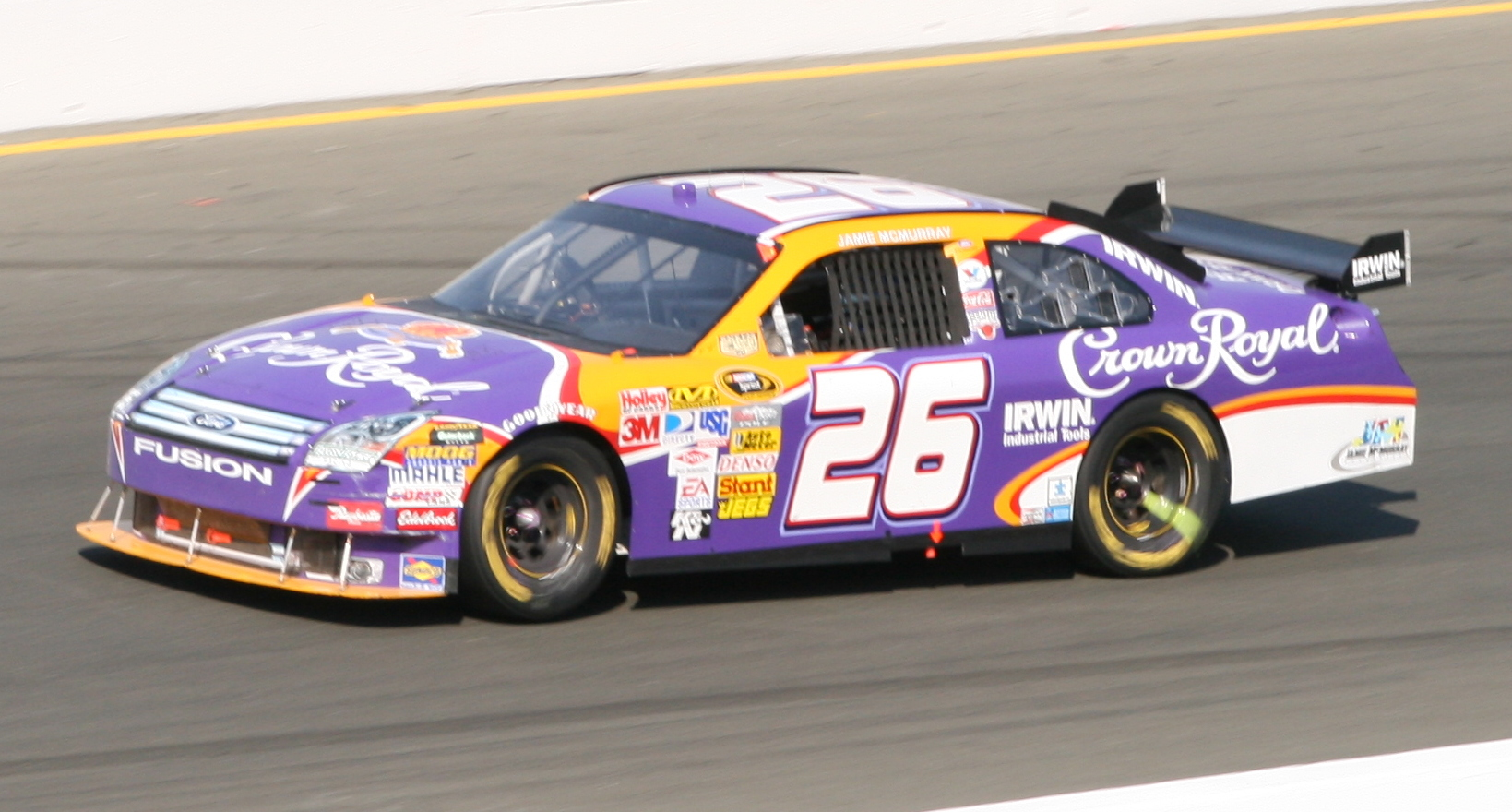
Jamie McMurray in the No. 26 during the 2008 Toyota/Save Mart 350.

After originally being signed to replace Mark Martin in the 6 car, Jamie McMurray became the 26 car's new driver, with sponsorships from Crown Royal, Smirnoff Ice, and Irwin Industrial Tools. He had seven top ten finishes and finished 25th in points in his first year with the team. For 2007, the season hit its peak when McMurray edged out Kyle Busch by 0.005 seconds to win the Pepsi 400. McMurray would end 2007 with one win, three top fives, and nine top tens along with a 17th-place finish in points. 2008 was mostly the same for the No. 26, but improving one spot to 16th thanks to four top fives in the final six races of the season. 2009 was the final season for the No. 26 team because of a new NASCAR rule that limit all teams to four full-time cars. McMurray finished 22nd in points, and returned to Chip Ganassi Racing (then Earnhardt Ganassi Racing) for 2010. Crown Royal moved to the No. 17 team of Matt Kenseth in 2010 after DeWalt terminated its sponsorship due to the economic downturn.

==== Latitude 43 Motorsports (2010) ====
In January 2010, Vermont businessman Bill Jenkins purchased the team and its owner points, signing a "services contract" with RFR to provide equipment and assistance. The new No. 26 team was called Latitude 43 Motorsports, after the cleaning products company Jenkins owns.

==== Car No. 26 results ====
Year	Driver	No.	Make	1	2	3	4	5	6	7	8	9	10	11	12	13	14	15	16	17	18	19	20	21	22	23	24	25	26	27	28	29	30	31	32	33	34	35	36	Owners	Pts
1998	Johnny Benson Jr.	26	Ford	DAY; DNQ	CAR; 30	LVS; 4	ATL; 9	DAR; 8	BRI; 5	TEX; 5	MAR; 38	TAL; 41	CAL; 8	CLT; 9	DOV; 41	RCH; 18	MCH; 22	POC; 36	SON; 21	NHA; 21	POC; 33	IND; 25	GLN; 9	MCH; 34	BRI; 33	NHA; 21	DAR; 21	RCH; 41	DOV; 15	MAR; 9	CLT; 28	TAL; 31	DAY; 26	PHO; 9	CAR; 41	ATL; 23				22nd	3160
1999	Johnny Benson Jr.	26	Ford	DAY; 17	CAR; 16	LVS; 38	ATL; 22	DAR; 18	TEX; 11	BRI; 29	MAR; 35	TAL; 30	CAL; 43	RCH; 28	CLT; 18	DOV; 7	MCH; 19	POC; 30	SON; 26	DAY; 24	NHA; 17	POC; 14	IND; 19	GLN; 38	MCH; 21	BRI; 33	DAR; 32	RCH; 22	NHA; 7	DOV; 18	MAR; 28	CLT; 16	TAL; 42	CAR; 28	PHO; 31	HOM; 35	ATL; 39			28th	3012
2006	Jamie McMurray	26	Ford	DAY; 37	CAL; 6	LVS; 23	ATL; 14	BRI; 35	MAR; 9	TEX; 37	PHO; 14	TAL; 5	RCH; 19	DAR; 42	CLT; 8	DOV; 2*	POC; 18	MCH; 23	SON; 18	DAY; 8	CHI; 39	NHA; 33	POC; 20	IND; 26	GLN; 3	MCH; 17	BRI; 29	CAL; 20	RCH; 25	NHA; 29	DOV; 17	KAN; 42	TAL; 37	CLT; 34	MAR; 19	ATL; 40	TEX; 26	PHO; 40	HOM; 35	24th	3405
2007	Jamie McMurray	26	Ford	DAY; 31	CAL; 37	LVS; 10	ATL; 15	BRI; 9	MAR; 9	TEX; 5	PHO; 23	TAL; 5	RCH; 41	DAR; 16	CLT; 19	DOV; 24	POC; 29	MCH; 8	SON; 37	NHA; 16	DAY; 1	CHI; 38	IND; 33	POC; 40	GLN; 34	MCH; 30	BRI; 26	CAL; 16	RCH; 38	NHA; 11	DOV; 8	KAN; 24	TAL; 37	CLT; 24	MAR; 32	ATL; 26	TEX; 9	PHO; 23	HOM; 14	18th	3556
2008	Jamie McMurray	26	Ford	DAY; 26	CAL; 22	LVS; 25	ATL; 40	BRI; 43	MAR; 8	TEX; 14	PHO; 17	TAL; 17	RCH; 35	DAR; 11	CLT; 23	DOV; 10	POC; 20	MCH; 10	SON; 18	NHA; 41	DAY; 32	CHI; 21	IND; 6	POC; 9	GLN; 16	MCH; 10	BRI; 12	CAL; 24	RCH; 29	NHA; 39	DOV; 36	KAN; 17	TAL; 32	CLT; 5	MAR; 38	ATL; 7	TEX; 3	PHO; 3	HOM; 3	17th	3809
2009	Jamie McMurray	26	Ford	DAY; 37	CAL; 16	LVS; 9	ATL; 15	BRI; 37	MAR; 10	TEX; 38	PHO; 11	TAL; 42	RCH; 7	DAR; 22	CLT; 21	DOV; 14	POC; 13	MCH; 11	SON; 14	NHA; 33	DAY; 11	CHI; 22	IND; 21	POC; 20	GLN; 40	MCH; 32	BRI; 11	ATL; 28	RCH; 27	NHA; 18	DOV; 28	KAN; 31	CAL; 36	CLT; 33	MAR; 6	TAL; 1*	TEX; 20	PHO; 19	HOM; 18	22nd	3604

=== Car No. 60 history ===
Matt Kenseth (1998)

Roush Racing attempted to run the No. 60 with Matt Kenseth at Talladega in 1998, but the team failed to make the race.

Stage60 (2024)

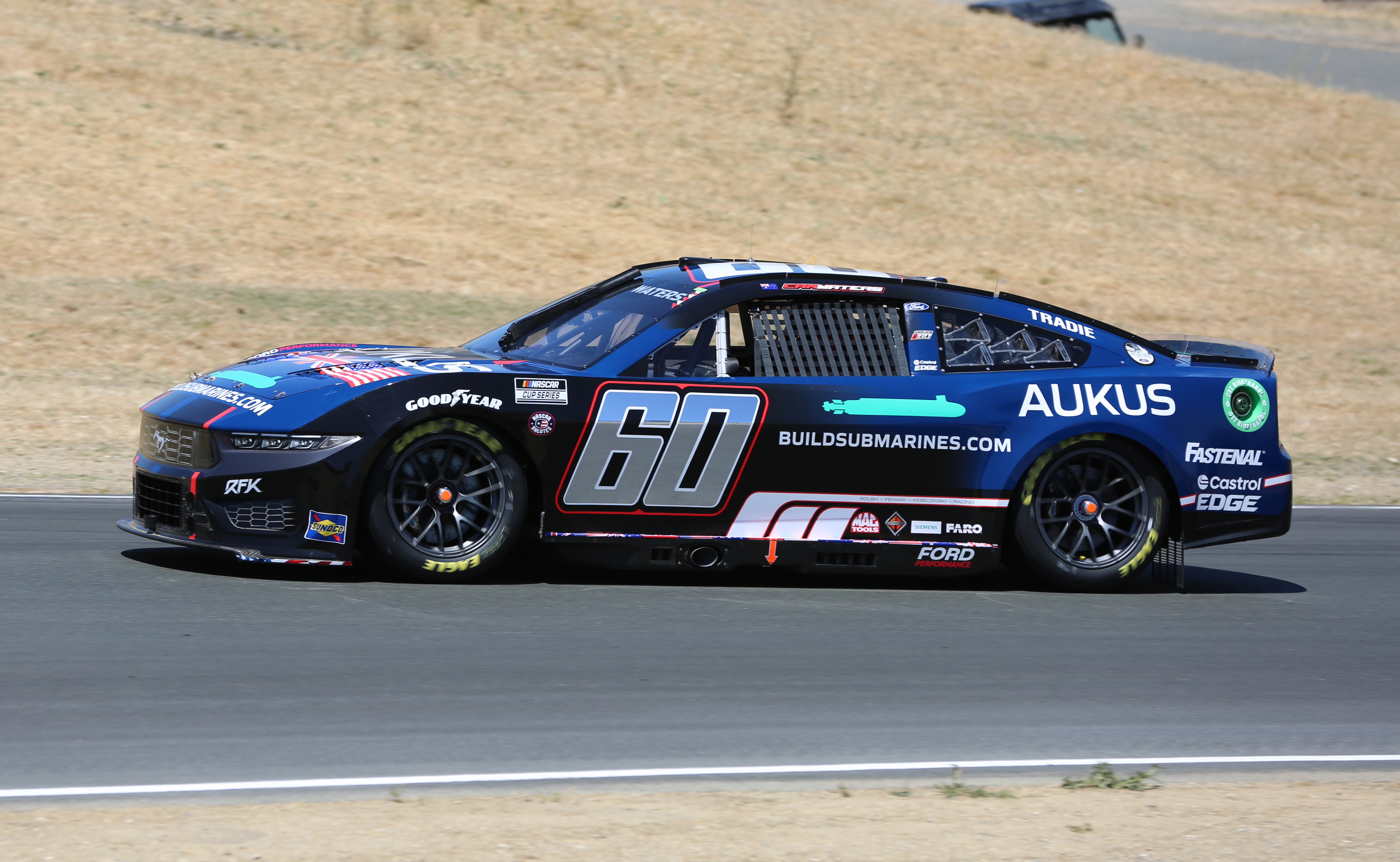
Waters at Sonoma in 2024.

On November 29, 2023, RFK Racing announced that they would run the No. 60 at the 2024 Daytona 500, with David Ragan behind the wheel. The team also announced they would field the No. 60 in select races as part of their "#Stage60" program. On May 14, 2024, it was announced that Cam Waters, a multi-time Supercars race winner, would make his Cup Series debut driving the No. 60 at Sonoma. On June 12, 2024, it was announced that Joey Hand would race the car at the Chicago Street Course.

Ryan Preece (2025–2026)

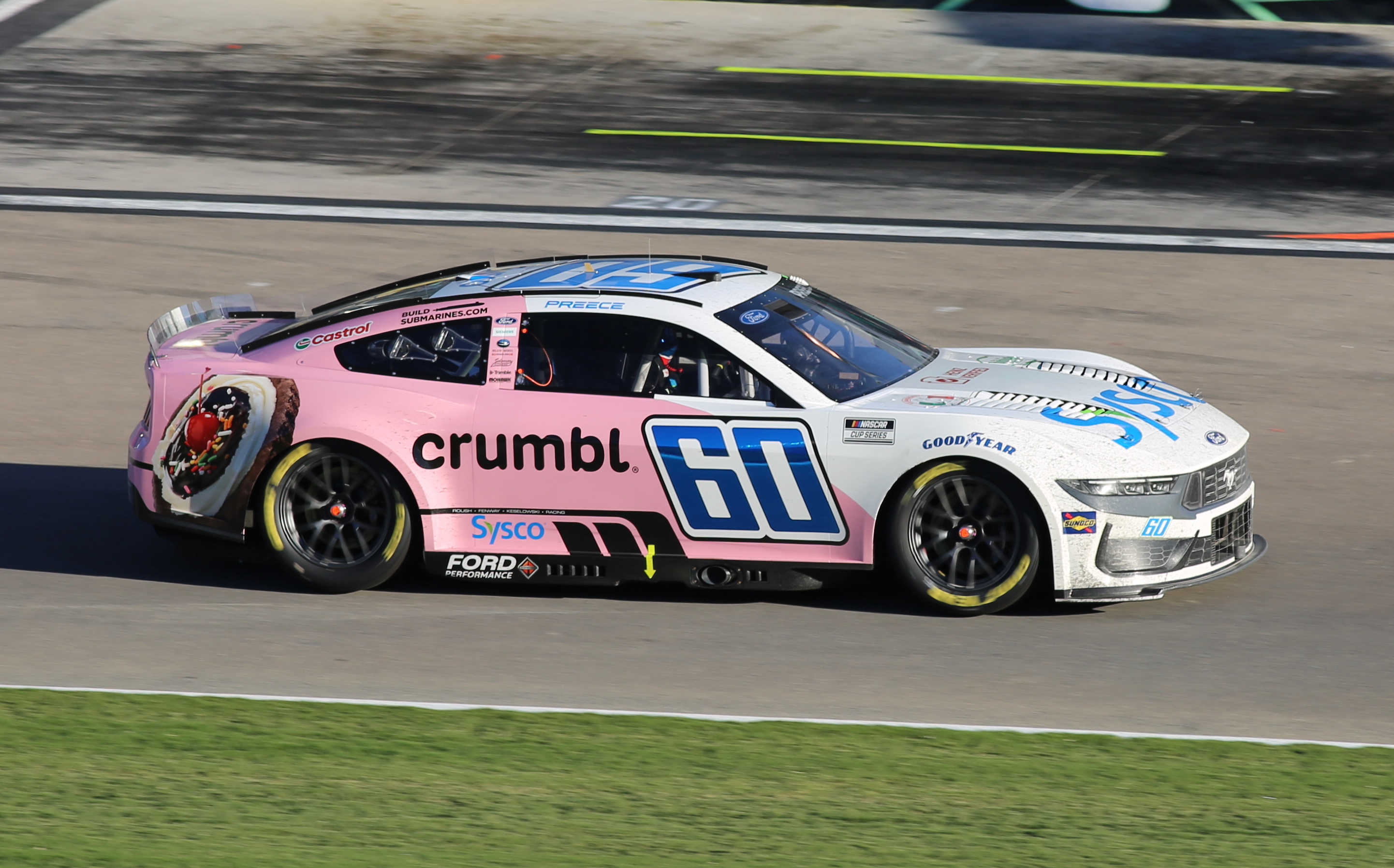
Ryan Preece in the No. 60 car at Las Vegas in 2025

On November 19, 2024, it was announced that RFK leased a charter from Rick Ware Racing to run the No. 60 full-time in 2025, with Ryan Preece signed as the driver and Kroger as a primary sponsor. At Talladega, Preece finished second to Austin Cindric by 0.022 seconds, but was disqualified after post-race inspection revealed the spoiler had three shims instead of two.

Preece started the 2026 season with a win at the Cook Out Clash. Following the race at Texas, he was penalized 25 points and fined US$50,000 for wrecking Ty Gibbs. NASCAR determined Preece's actions were premeditated during a radio conversation with his team after an earlier run-in with Gibbs during the race. He won his first Cup race at the summer Daytona race.

On November 4, 2026, RFK announced that Preece will move from the No. 60 car to the No. 6 car.

==== Car No. 60 results ====
Year	Driver	No.	Make	1	2	3	4	5	6	7	8	9	10	11	12	13	14	15	16	17	18	19	20	21	22	23	24	25	26	27	28	29	30	31	32	33	34	35	36	Owners	Pts
1998	Matt Kenseth	60	Ford	DAY	CAR	LVS	ATL	DAR	BRI	TEX	MAR	TAL; DNQ	CAL	CLT	DOV	RCH	MCH	POC	SON	NHA	POC	IND	GLN	MCH	BRI	NHA	DAR	RCH	DOV	MAR	CLT	TAL	DAY	PHO	CAR	ATL				68th	22
2024	David Ragan	60	Ford	DAY; 20	ATL	LVS	PHO	BRI	COA	RCH	MAR	TEX	TAL	DOV	KAN	DAR	CLT	GTW																						40th	62
2024	Cam Waters	60	Ford																SON; 35	IOW	NHA	NSH																		40th	62
2024	Joey Hand	60	Ford																				CSC; 4	POC	IND	RCH	MCH	DAY	DAR	ATL	GLN	BRI	KAN	TAL	ROV	LVS	HOM	MAR	PHO	40th	62
2025	Ryan Preece	60	Ford	DAY; 32	ATL; 18	COA; 33	PHO; 15	LVS; 3	HOM; 9	MAR; 7	DAR; 26	BRI; 20	TAL; 38	TEX; 29	KAN; 7	CLT; 9	NSH; 28	MCH; 9	MXC; 15	POC; 8	ATL; 15	CSC; 7	SON; 12	DOV; 19	IND; 4	IOW; 5	GLN; 13	RCH; 35	DAY; 14	DAR; 16	GTW; 13	BRI; 21	NHA; 14	KAN; 26	ROV; 6	LVS; 9	TAL; 15	MAR; 6	PHO; 9	18th	861
2026	Ryan Preece	60	Ford	DAY; 25	ATL; 9	COA; 18	PHO; 13	LVS; 11	DAR; 13	MAR; 12	BRI; 8	KAN; 11	TAL; 18	TEX; 14	GLN; 14	CLT; 33	NSH; 36	MCH; 28	POC; 28	COR; 11	SON; 8	CHI; 32	ATL; 24	NWS; 10	IND; 8	IOW; 20	RCH; 17	NHA; 9	DAY; 1	DAR; 10	GTW; 17	BRI; 10	KAN; 10	LVS; 28	CLT; 15	PHO; 18	TAL; 13	MAR; 23	HOM; 25	15th	2231

=== Car No. 97 history ===
Chad Little (1993–2000)

The No. 97 car raced for the first time at the 1993 fall event at Charlotte. Sponsored by Kleenex and owned by Greg Pollex, Chad Little was the driver. Little and Pollex ran part-time for four years with various sponsorships until 1997, when they ran full-time with backing from John Deere. However, after experiencing financial and performance struggles, Roush bought the team three-quarters of the way through the season, becoming the fifth Roush Racing entry. Little qualified for 27 out of 32 races that year. The team returned in 1998, with Little signing a multi-year contract, and the car changing to the Ford nameplate from Pontiac.

Despite missing the spring Atlanta race, Little finished a career-best second at the Texas 500 and finished 15th in points. After that, the performance of the team slipped, and midway through 2000 it was announced that Little would leave the team.

Kurt Busch (2000–2005)

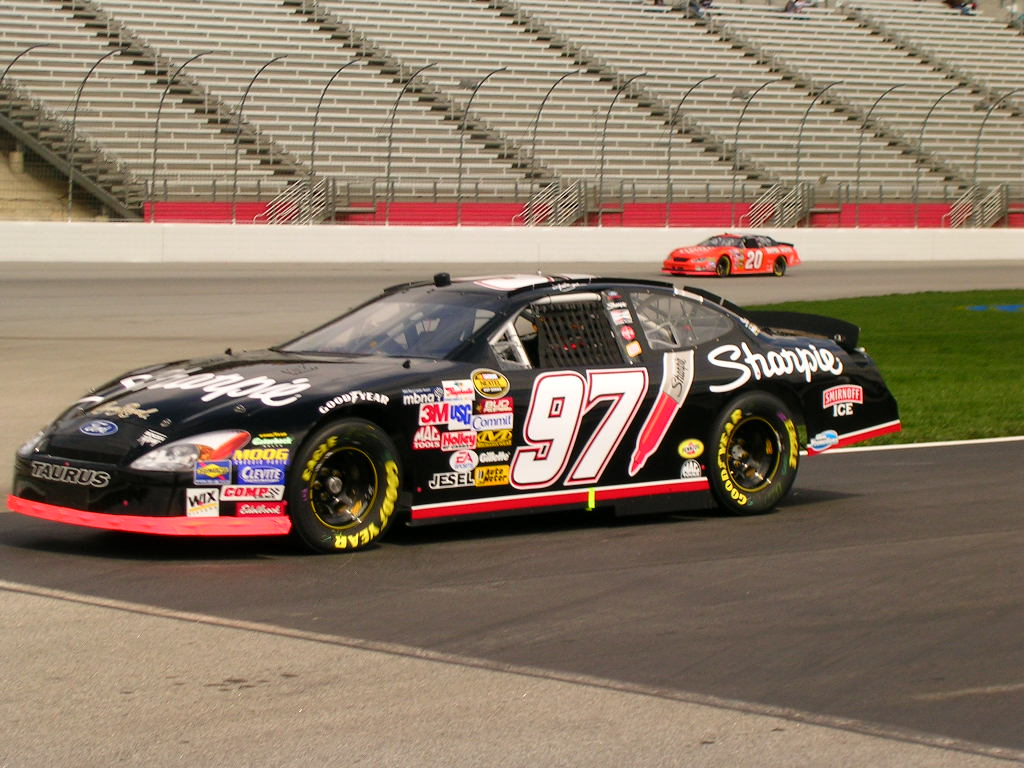
Kurt Busch in the No. 97 at Atlanta in 2005.

Prior to the fall race at Dover, Little was released and Kurt Busch, a Roush Craftsman Truck Series driver, drove for the team for the final seven races. With John Deere leaving, the No. 97 car (like the No. 16 car in 2000) started the 2001 season unsponsored, but soon found sponsorships from Newell Rubbermaid brands Rubbermaid and Sharpie. Busch's rookie year in the Winston Cup Series was unspectacular save for a pole at Darlington. The team finished 27th in points, with only six top ten finishes. In 2002, Busch grabbed headlines after battling with Jimmy Spencer for a win at Bristol. This sparked a rivalry between the two drivers that lasted for the following years. However, the 2002 season marked a coming-of-age for the team, which won four times (including 3 of the final five races and the season finale at Homestead) and finished third in the championship points. Busch drove the No. 97 to victory lane four times in 2003, along with 14 top ten finishes. The team was riding in the top tens for most of the season, but late season struggles brought the team an 11th-place points finish. 2004 was the defining year of team No. 97. Winning three times, earning 21 top ten finishes, and clinching a pole, Busch won the first Chase for the Cup Championship. In 2005, he won three times and finished tenth in points.

Midway through the 2005 season, Busch shocked many in the NASCAR community when he announced that he would be leaving Roush Racing and replacing the retiring Rusty Wallace in the No. 2, owned by Penske Racing. On November 7, 2005, it was announced that Busch had been released from contractual obligations at Roush and would leave the team at the end of the season. In November 2005, Busch was cited for reckless driving in an area close to Phoenix. Although no action was taken by NASCAR, Roush Racing suspended Busch for the remainder of the 2005 season. Kenny Wallace took his place for the final two races of the season. On November 16, 2005, it was officially announced that the No. 97 car would be renumbered as the No. 26 (last used by Roush in 1999) for the 2006 season.

==== Car No. 97 results ====
Year	Driver	No.	Make	1	2	3	4	5	6	7	8	9	10	11	12	13	14	15	16	17	18	19	20	21	22	23	24	25	26	27	28	29	30	31	32	33	34	35	36	Owners	Pts
1997	Chad Little	97	Pontiac	DAY; DNQ	CAR; DNQ	RCH; 34	ATL; 19	DAR; 27	TEX; 26	BRI; 8	MAR; 42	SON; DNQ	TAL; 34	CLT; DNQ	DOV; 31	POC; DNQ	MCH; 25	CAL; 19	DAY; 42	NHA; 30	POC; 28	IND; 42	GLN; 42	MCH; 42	BRI; 20	DAR; 11	RCH; 40	NHA; 28	DOV; 29	MAR; 35	CLT; 23	TAL; 40	CAR; 16	PHO; 25	ATL; 18					38th	2081
1998	Chad Little	97	Ford	DAY; 7	CAR; 21	LVS; 10	ATL; DNQ	DAR; 17	BRI; 35	TEX; 2	MAR; 16	TAL; 34	CAL; 6	CLT; 35	DOV; 37	RCH; 13	MCH; 16	POC; 30	SON; 23	NHA; 22	POC; 16	IND; 28	GLN; 16	MCH; 10	BRI; 23	NHA; 14	DAR; 18	RCH; 12	DOV; 17	MAR; 36	CLT; 8	TAL; 8	DAY; 20	PHO; 20	CAR; 40	ATL; 11				15th	3423
1999	Chad Little	97	Ford	DAY; 9	CAR; 21	LVS; 14	ATL; 9	DAR; 28	TEX; 13	BRI; 24	MAR; 17	TAL; 42	CAL; 22	RCH; 35	CLT; 24	DOV; 28	MCH; 28	POC; 32	SON; 16	DAY; 29	NHA; 24	POC; 22	IND; 43	GLN; 14	MCH; 6	BRI; 30	DAR; 20	RCH; 42	NHA; 28	DOV; 7	MAR; 31	CLT; 18	TAL; 36	CAR; 21	PHO; 16	HOM; 39	ATL; 6			23rd	3193
2000	Chad Little	97	Ford	DAY; 23	CAR; 18	LVS; 19	ATL; 6	DAR; 15	BRI; 23	TEX; 13	MAR; 27	TAL; 25	CAL; 15	RCH; 39	CLT; 20	DOV; 20	MCH; 32	POC; 17	SON; 25	DAY; 16	NHA; 42	POC; 20	IND; 19	GLN; 12	MCH; 22	BRI; 30	DAR; 21	RCH; 29	NHA; 33				TAL; 18							23rd	3247
2000	Kurt Busch	97	Ford																											DOV; 18	MAR; 37	CLT; 13		CAR; 24	PHO; 29	HOM; 19	ATL; 36			23rd	3247
2001	Kurt Busch	97	Ford	DAY; 41	CAR; 36	LVS; 11	ATL; 10	DAR; 30	BRI; 42	TEX; 4	MAR; 33	TAL; 3	CAL; 13	RCH; 18	CLT; 12	DOV; 39	MCH; 43	POC; 13	SON; 23	DAY; 30	CHI; 8	NHA; 42	POC; 37	IND; 5	GLN; 29	MCH; 43	BRI; 25	DAR; 39	RCH; 24	DOV; 41	KAN; 9	CLT; 22	MAR; 35	TAL; 29	PHO; 22	CAR; 39	HOM; 23	ATL; DNQ	NHA; 21	27th	3081
2002	Kurt Busch	97	Ford	DAY; 4	CAR; 12	LVS; 20	ATL; 11	DAR; 28	BRI; 1	TEX; 23	MAR; 10	TAL; 3	CAL; 2	RCH; 27	CLT; 31	DOV; 12	POC; 40	MCH; 10	SON; 4	DAY; 31	CHI; 6	NHA; 8	POC; 2	IND; 41	GLN; 41	MCH; 39	BRI; 6	DAR; 7	RCH; 19	NHA; 2	DOV; 7	KAN; 31	TAL; 4	CLT; 12	MAR; 1	ATL; 1	CAR; 3	PHO; 6	HOM; 1	3rd	4641
2003	Kurt Busch	97	Ford	DAY; 2	CAR; 2	LVS; 38	ATL; 40	DAR; 2	BRI; 1	TEX; 9	TAL; 19	MAR; 28	CAL; 1	RCH; 8	CLT; 15	DOV; 15	POC; 36	MCH; 1	SON; 28	DAY; 36	CHI; 39	NHA; 11	POC; 2	IND; 7	GLN; 12	MCH; 18	BRI; 1	DAR; 13	RCH; 24	NHA; 15	DOV; 38	TAL; 6	KAN; 40	CLT; 41	MAR; 39	ATL; 8	PHO; 4	CAR; 17	HOM; 36	11th	4150
2004	Kurt Busch	97	Ford	DAY; 16	CAR; 8	LVS; 9	ATL; 12	DAR; 6	BRI; 1	TEX; 6	MAR; 11	TAL; 36	CAL; 23	RCH; 31	CLT; 11	DOV; 12	POC; 5	MCH; 11	SON; 36	DAY; 4	CHI; 35	NHA; 1	POC; 26	IND; 10	GLN; 10	MCH; 6	BRI; 8	CAL; 11	RCH; 15	NHA; 1	DOV; 5	TAL; 5	KAN; 6	CLT; 4	MAR; 5	ATL; 42	PHO; 10	DAR; 6	HOM; 5	1st	6506
2005	Kurt Busch	97	Ford	DAY; 2	CAL; 3	LVS; 3	ATL; 32	BRI; 35	MAR; 19	TEX; 7	PHO; 1	TAL; 7	DAR; 37	RCH; 17	CLT; 43	DOV; 9	POC; 22	MCH; 12	SON; 3	DAY; 37	CHI; 8	NHA; 2	POC; 1	IND; 18	GLN; 39	MCH; 7	BRI; 10	CAL; 12	RCH; 1	NHA; 35	DOV; 23	TAL; 8	KAN; 14	CLT; 2	MAR; 6	ATL; 36	TEX; 10			8th	6189
2005	Kenny Wallace	97	Ford																																			PHO; 16	HOM; 21	8th	6189

=== Car No. 99 history ===
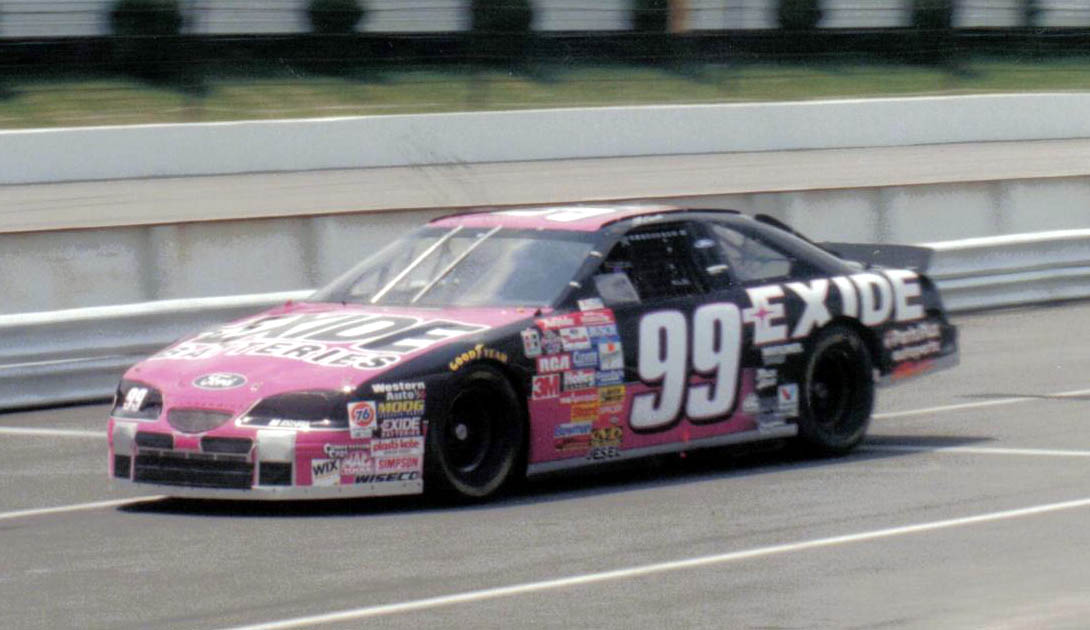
The No. 99 car from 1996 to 1997

Jeff Burton (1996–2003)

The No. 99 car first raced at the 1996 Daytona 500, with Jeff Burton driving and Exide Batteries as the sponsor. The car finished 5th in that race. After missing the first Atlanta race, Burton won a pole at Michigan and finished 13th in the points standings. Burton won the first three races of his career in 1997, (including the inaugural Cup race at Texas) and ended the season fourth in the points. In 1998, Burton enjoyed another successful season, winning 2 races, mounting 23 top ten finishes, and finishing fifth in the championship points standings. The team led the points standings part of 1999, but lost the top spot after performing poorly at Richmond. The team again finished 5th in points, with six wins and—like the previous year–23 top tens. Late in 2000, Exide ceased their sponsorship, and Citgo joined with new financial backing. The car finished a team-high third in the points standings with four wins (one of which was at New Hampshire in September where NASCAR used restrictor plates following the deaths of Adam Petty and Kenny Irwin earlier that year), 22 top tens, and one pole. Burton won 2 races in 2001, at Charlotte and Phoenix, but fell back to 10th in the points with 16 top tens. The No. 99 would not win another race with Burton behind the wheel, as he managed back-to-back 12th-place points standings finishes in 2002 and 2003. After 2003, Citgo left the team.

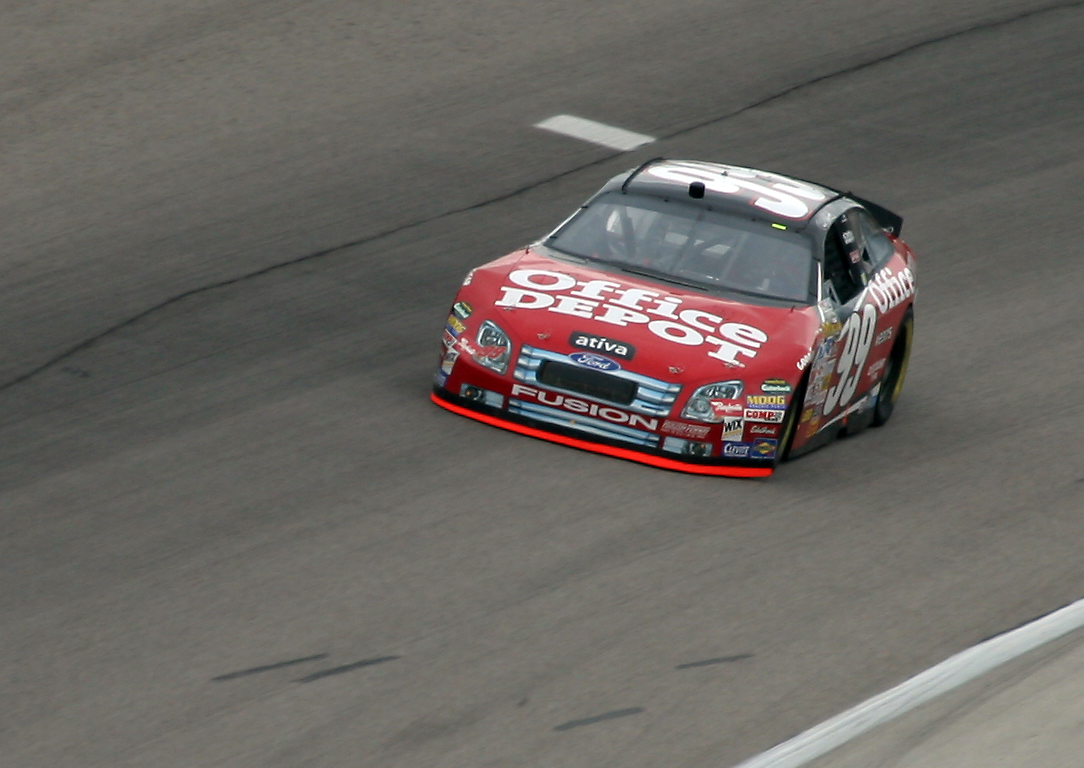
Carl Edwards at Texas in 2007.

Multiple Drivers (2004)

Roush was unable to find full-time backing for Burton in the 99, and he began the 2004 season with several one-off sponsorship deals such as Pennzoil, Team Caliber, and Hot Wheels and some support from his secondary sponsors such as SKF. Burton would eventually depart the team in August, taking over the #30 AOL Chevrolet for Richard Childress Racing. Roush development driver Carl Edwards would do the remaining races, while Dave Blaney did the fall Charlotte race.

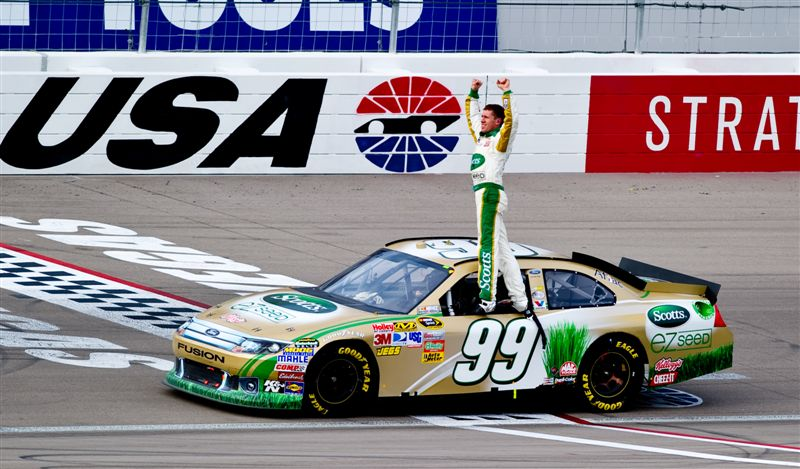
Edwards winning at Las Vegas in 2011.

Carl Edwards (2004, 2005–2014)

To fill the void left by this departure, Roush elevated Carl Edwards from the Truck series. Edwards showed immediate promise while driving the unsponsored No. 99 car, posting five top ten finishes in his shortened season. In 2005—his first full-time season—with sponsorship from Scotts, Office Depot, Stonebridge Life Insurance Company, and World Financial Group, Edwards won four races and finished in a tie for 2nd in the points standings (with teammate Greg Biffle actually winning the tiebreaker by virtue of his series-best six wins). In 2006, Office Depot became the team's exclusive sponsor. Edwards failed to win or make the Chase for the Cup, posting ten top fives but finishing 12th in points. Edwards snapped his 52-race winless streak by winning the 2007 Citizens Bank 400 at Michigan. He won twice more at the Bristol night race and the fall Dover race, finishing 9th in points. In 2008, Edwards posted a series-best nine wins and also led in top fives and top tens, but he was still runner-up by 69 points to three-time consecutive champion Jimmie Johnson. Office Depot did not renew their sponsorship after the 2008 season. In 2009, Aflac became the new sponsor for Carl Edwards and the No. 99 car. Edwards made the chase in 2009 finishing 11th in points despite not winning a race. In 2010, Kellogg's moved from Hendrick Motorsports to join the team as the primary sponsor for two races, and associate sponsor for the rest of the season. Scotts also joined Edwards' Cup sponsorship after several years as a Nationwide sponsor. Edwards snapped a 70-race winless skid with his victory in the 2010 Kobalt Tools 500 at Phoenix. One week later, he won his second race in a row at Homestead in the Ford 400.

In 2011, Edwards still drove the No. 99. He won his only race of the season at Las Vegas, but managed to remain in the top 12 with consistent finishes. Kellogg's and Subway returned to sponsor a few races, and Edwards managed to finish 2nd in points on a tiebreaker with Tony Stewart. For 2012, the No. 99 was sponsored by Fastenal, Kellogg's, UPS and Best Buy. Edwards finished 15th in points, winless, with three top fives and 13 top tens. In 2013, Edwards ended his winless streak by winning in Phoenix. Edwards won again at the fall Richmond race, however struggles during the chase relegated him to a 13th place points finish.

Edwards won the Food City 500 at Bristol in March 2014 to lock himself into that year's Chase. He later went to win the Toyota/Save Mart 350, his first and only career road-course victory to date. However, on July 27, 2014, Roush Fenway announced that Edwards would not return to the No. 99 in 2015 and that sponsor Fastenal would move to Roush's No. 17 car to replace the departing Nationwide Insurance. This left the No. 99 without a sponsor or a driver for 2015, and the crew was moved to the resurrected No. 6 team with Trevor Bayne.

Ryan Reed (2016)

On October 23, 2016, the No. 99 returned, as Ryan Reed made his Sprint Cup debut at Talladega. Reed made the race, starting 18th and finishing 26th, completing all the laps (including the overtime laps). After not running in 2017, the No. 99 moved to StarCom Racing which ran part-time in 2018, then to Trackhouse Racing Team in 2021.

Corey LaJoie (2026)

On January 20, 2026, it was announced that Corey LaJoie would attempt to qualify for the Daytona 500, in the No. 99 car, the first time that number was used by the team since 2016.

In his Duel race, RFK dominated the majority of the race, seeking to help LaJoie clinch among the "Open" cars, as he had not qualified for the race. Unfortunately for LaJoie, a last lap wreck would end his chances of making the race.

==== Car No. 99 results ====
Year	Driver	No.	Make	1	2	3	4	5	6	7	8	9	10	11	12	13	14	15	16	17	18	19	20	21	22	23	24	25	26	27	28	29	30	31	32	33	34	35	36	Owners	Pts
1996	Jeff Burton	99	Ford	DAY; 5	CAR; 13	RCH; 4	ATL; DNQ	DAR; 10	BRI; 23	NWS; 29	MAR; 22	TAL; 16	SON; 26	CLT; 18	DOV; 9	POC; 9	MCH; 17	DAY; 14	NHA; 4	POC; 35	TAL; 7	IND; 11	GLN; 21	MCH; 9	BRI; 37	DAR; 31	RCH; 3	DOV; 40	MAR; 11	NWS; 4	CLT; 11	CAR; 5	PHO; 31	ATL; 9						13th	3538
1997	Jeff Burton	99	Ford	DAY; 11	CAR; 3	RCH; 42	ATL; 5	DAR; 4	TEX; 1	BRI; 42	MAR; 15	SON; 9	TAL; 8	CLT; 5	DOV; 3	POC; 2	MCH; 14	CAL; 30	DAY; 8	NHA; 1*	POC; 3	IND; 15	GLN; 29	MCH; 8	BRI; 4	DAR; 2	RCH; 2*	NHA; 14	DOV; 11	MAR; 1	CLT; 6	TAL; 14	CAR; 38	PHO; 13	ATL; 34					4th	4285
1998	Jeff Burton	99	Ford	DAY; 40	CAR; 18	LVS; 2	ATL; 8	DAR; 5*	BRI; 4	TEX; 29	MAR; 32	TAL; 43	CAL; 10	CLT; 8	DOV; 2	RCH; 7	MCH; 4	POC; 4	SON; 39	NHA; 1*	POC; 3	IND; 36	GLN; 23	MCH; 5	BRI; 2	NHA; 5	DAR; 2*	RCH; 1*	DOV; 38	MAR; 5	CLT; 3	TAL; 10	DAY; 13	PHO; 4	CAR; 5	ATL; 4				5th	4415
1999	Jeff Burton	99	Ford	DAY; 35	CAR; 4*	LVS; 1*	ATL; 4	DAR; 1*	TEX; 7	BRI; 5	MAR; 2	TAL; 11	CAL; 2	RCH; 37	CLT; 1*	DOV; 8	MCH; 3	POC; 36	SON; 24	DAY; 3	NHA; 1	POC; 36	IND; 5	GLN; 13	MCH; 37	BRI; 17	DAR; 1*	RCH; 13	NHA; 4	DOV; 6	MAR; 9	CLT; 37	TAL; 8	CAR; 1	PHO; 4	HOM; 3	ATL; 5			5th	4733
2000	Jeff Burton	99	Ford	DAY; 2	CAR; 32	LVS; 1*	ATL; 43	DAR; 5	BRI; 9	TEX; 2	MAR; 2	TAL; 12	CAL; 5	RCH; 7	CLT; 11	DOV; 34	MCH; 11	POC; 7	SON; 16	DAY; 1	NHA; 11	POC; 2	IND; 6	GLN; 3	MCH; 10	BRI; 6	DAR; 2	RCH; 5*	NHA; 1**	DOV; 36	MAR; 3*	CLT; 6	TAL; 29	CAR; 4	PHO; 1*	HOM; 11	ATL; 12			3rd	4841
2001	Jeff Burton	99	Ford	DAY; 19	CAR; 37	LVS; 39	ATL; 30	DAR; 18	BRI; 40	TEX; 19	MAR; 3	TAL; 10	CAL; 31	RCH; 14	CLT; 1*	DOV; 31	MCH; 7	POC; 10	SON; 8	DAY; 8	CHI; 18	NHA; 11	POC; 36	IND; 16	GLN; 2	MCH; 16	BRI; 15	DAR; 6	RCH; 9	DOV; 21	KAN; 11	CLT; 5	MAR; 5	TAL; 3	PHO; 1*	CAR; 18	HOM; 4	ATL; 10	NHA; 17	10th	4394
2002	Jeff Burton	99	Ford	DAY; 12	CAR; 6	LVS; 9	ATL; 21	DAR; 11	BRI; 26	TEX; 39	MAR; 9	TAL; 9	CAL; 19	RCH; 3	CLT; 40	DOV; 3	POC; 6	MCH; 20	SON; 29	DAY; 33	CHI; 39	NHA; 12	POC; 16	IND; 29	GLN; 7	MCH; 4	BRI; 13	DAR; 10	RCH; 39	NHA; 20	DOV; 6	KAN; 29	TAL; 11	CLT; 7	MAR; 17	ATL; 12	CAR; 4	PHO; 12	HOM; 3	13th	4259
2003	Jeff Burton	99	Ford	DAY; 11	CAR; 12	LVS; 6	ATL; 33	DAR; 42	BRI; 13	TEX; 20	TAL; 35	MAR; 4	CAL; 19	RCH; 9	CLT; 18	DOV; 14	POC; 14	MCH; 11	SON; 38	DAY; 2	CHI; 6	NHA; 9	POC; 6	IND; 27	GLN; 31	MCH; 11	BRI; 32	DAR; 11	RCH; 4	NHA; 42	DOV; 12	TAL; 32	KAN; 13	CLT; 20	MAR; 10	ATL; 23	PHO; 8	CAR; 7	HOM; 14	12th	4109
2004	Jeff Burton	99	Ford	DAY; 42	CAR; 37	LVS; 13	ATL; 20	DAR; 11	BRI; 38	TEX; 27	MAR; 25	TAL; 7	CAL; 26	RCH; 14	CLT; 22	DOV; 4	POC; 24	MCH; 13	SON; 9	DAY; 23	CHI; 33	NHA; 12	POC; 34	IND; 12	GLN; 12															21st	3713
2004	Carl Edwards	99	Ford																							MCH; 10	BRI; 33	CAL; 6	RCH; 6	NHA; 20	DOV; 18	TAL; 42	KAN; 22	CLT; QL^{†}	MAR; 24	ATL; 3	PHO; 37	DAR; 7	HOM; 14	21st	3713
2004	Dave Blaney	99	Ford																															CLT; 37						21st	3713
2005	Carl Edwards	99	Ford	DAY; 12	CAL; 5	LVS; 14	ATL; 1	BRI; 26	MAR; 38	TEX; 19	PHO; 7	TAL; 32	DAR; 9	RCH; 21	CLT; 3	DOV; 16	POC; 1	MCH; 5	SON; 38	DAY; 33	CHI; 39	NHA; 12	POC; 4	IND; 12	GLN; 19	MCH; 4	BRI; 24	CAL; 4	RCH; 21	NHA; 19	DOV; 9	TAL; 5	KAN; 3	CLT; 10	MAR; 26	ATL; 1	TEX; 1	PHO; 6	HOM; 4	3rd	6498
2006	Carl Edwards	99	Ford	DAY; 43	CAL; 3	LVS; 26	ATL; 40	BRI; 4	MAR; 16	TEX; 36	PHO; 4	TAL; 8	RCH; 7	DAR; 39	CLT; 3	DOV; 15	POC; 25	MCH; 2	SON; 6	DAY; 39	CHI; 20	NHA; 2	POC; 39	IND; 9	GLN; 5	MCH; 22	BRI; 7	CAL; 4	RCH; 35	NHA; 18	DOV; 2	KAN; 6	TAL; 9	CLT; 8	MAR; 12	ATL; 7	TEX; 15	PHO; 5	HOM; 8	12th	4428
2007	Carl Edwards	99	Ford	DAY; 23	CAL; 29	LVS; 6	ATL; 7	BRI; 12	MAR; 17	TEX; 12	PHO; 11	TAL; 42	RCH; 12	DAR; 5	CLT; 15	DOV; 3	POC; 14	MCH; 1	SON; 18	NHA; 13	DAY; 4	CHI; 3	IND; 18	POC; 21	GLN; 8	MCH; 7	BRI; 1	CAL; 2	RCH; 42	NHA; 12	DOV; 1	KAN; 37	TAL; 14	CLT; 5	MAR; 11	ATL; 2	TEX; 26	PHO; 42	HOM; 5	9th	6222
2008	Carl Edwards	99	Ford	DAY; 19	CAL; 1	LVS; 1	ATL; 42	BRI; 16	MAR; 9	TEX; 1	PHO; 4	TAL; 40	RCH; 7	DAR; 2	CLT; 9	DOV; 2	POC; 9	MCH; 7	SON; 9	NHA; 17	DAY; 2	CHI; 32	IND; 2	POC; 1	GLN; 9	MCH; 1	BRI; 1	CAL; 6	RCH; 13	NHA; 3	DOV; 3	KAN; 2	TAL; 29	CLT; 33	MAR; 3	ATL; 1	TEX; 1	PHO; 4	HOM; 1	2nd	6615
2009	Carl Edwards	99	Ford	DAY; 18	CAL; 7	LVS; 17	ATL; 3	BRI; 15	MAR; 26	TEX; 10	PHO; 10	TAL; 24	RCH; 26	DAR; 32	CLT; 4	DOV; 7	POC; 2	MCH; 4	SON; 13	NHA; 19	DAY; 4	CHI; 14	IND; 15	POC; 18	GLN; 3	MCH; 4	BRI; 16	ATL; 37	RCH; 15	NHA; 17	DOV; 11	KAN; 10	CAL; 6	CLT; 39	MAR; 20	TAL; 14	TEX; 39	PHO; 16	HOM; 7	11th	6618
2010	Carl Edwards	99	Ford	DAY; 9	CAL; 13	LVS; 12	ATL; 39	BRI; 6	MAR; 8	PHO; 7	TEX; 33	TAL; 11	RCH; 5	DAR; 15	DOV; 8	CLT; 16	POC; 12	MCH; 12	SON; 29	NHA; 25	DAY; 6	CHI; 2	IND; 7	POC; 3	GLN; 5	MCH; 3	BRI; 12	ATL; 2	RCH; 10	NHA; 11	DOV; 5	KAN; 5	CAL; 6	CLT; 34	MAR; 12	TAL; 17	TEX; 19	PHO; 1	HOM; 1	4th	6393
2011	Carl Edwards	99	Ford	DAY; 2	PHO; 28	LVS; 1	BRI; 2	CAL; 6	MAR; 18	TEX; 3	TAL; 6	RCH; 5	DAR; 2	DOV; 7	CLT; 16	KAN; 5	POC; 37	MCH; 5	SON; 3	DAY; 37	KEN; 5	NHA; 13	IND; 14	POC; 7	GLN; 12	MCH; 36	BRI; 9	ATL; 5	RCH; 2	CHI; 4	NHA; 8	DOV; 3	KAN; 5	CLT; 3	TAL; 11	MAR; 9	TEX; 2	PHO; 2	HOM; 2	2nd	2403
2012	Carl Edwards	99	Ford	DAY; 8	PHO; 17	LVS; 5	BRI; 39	CAL; 5	MAR; 11	TEX; 8	KAN; 9	RCH; 10	TAL; 31	DAR; 7	CLT; 9	DOV; 26	POC; 11	MCH; 11	SON; 21	KEN; 20	DAY; 6	NHA; 18	IND; 29	POC; 7	GLN; 14	MCH; 6	BRI; 22	ATL; 36	RCH; 17	CHI; 19	NHA; 19	DOV; 5	TAL; 36	CLT; 7	KAN; 14	MAR; 18	TEX; 16	PHO; 11	HOM; 12	15th	1030
2013	Carl Edwards	99	Ford	DAY; 33	PHO; 1	LVS; 5	BRI; 18	CAL; 4	MAR; 15	TEX; 3	KAN; 17	RCH; 6	TAL; 3	DAR; 7	CLT; 11	DOV; 14	POC; 18	MCH; 8	SON; 3	KEN; 21	DAY; 29	NHA; 8	IND; 13	POC; 11	GLN; 4	MCH; 10	BRI; 39	ATL; 18	RCH; 1	CHI; 11	NHA; 9	DOV; 35	KAN; 5	CLT; 10	TAL; 17	MAR; 12	TEX; 37	PHO; 21	HOM; 12	13th	2282
2014	Carl Edwards	99	Ford	DAY; 17	PHO; 8	LVS; 5	BRI; 1	CAL; 10	MAR; 13	TEX; 14	DAR; 13	RCH; 9	TAL; 30	KAN; 6	CLT; 4	DOV; 14	POC; 41	MCH; 23	SON; 1	KEN; 17	DAY; 37	NHA; 13	IND; 15	POC; 29	GLN; 5	MCH; 23	BRI; 7	ATL; 5	RCH; 22	CHI; 20	NHA; 17	DOV; 11	KAN; 5	CLT; 8	TAL; 21	MAR; 20	TEX; 9	PHO; 15	HOM; 34	9th	2288
2016	Ryan Reed	99	Ford	DAY	ATL	LVS	PHO	CAL	MAR	TEX	BRI	RCH	TAL	KAN	DOV	CLT	POC	MCH	SON	DAY	KEN	NHA	IND	POC	GLN	BRI	MCH	DAR	RCH	CHI	NHA	DOV	CLT	KAN	TAL; 26	MAR	TEX	PHO	HOM	44th	19
2026	Corey LaJoie	99	Ford	DAY; DNQ	ATL	COA	PHO	LVS	DAR	MAR	BRI	KAN	TAL	TEX	GLN	CLT	NSH	MCH	POC	COR	SON	CHI	ATL	NWS	IND	IOW	RCH	NHA	DAY	DAR	GTW	BRI	KAN	LVS	CLT	PHO	TAL	MAR	HOM		
