= The Big One (motorsport) =

American car racing term for a major crash

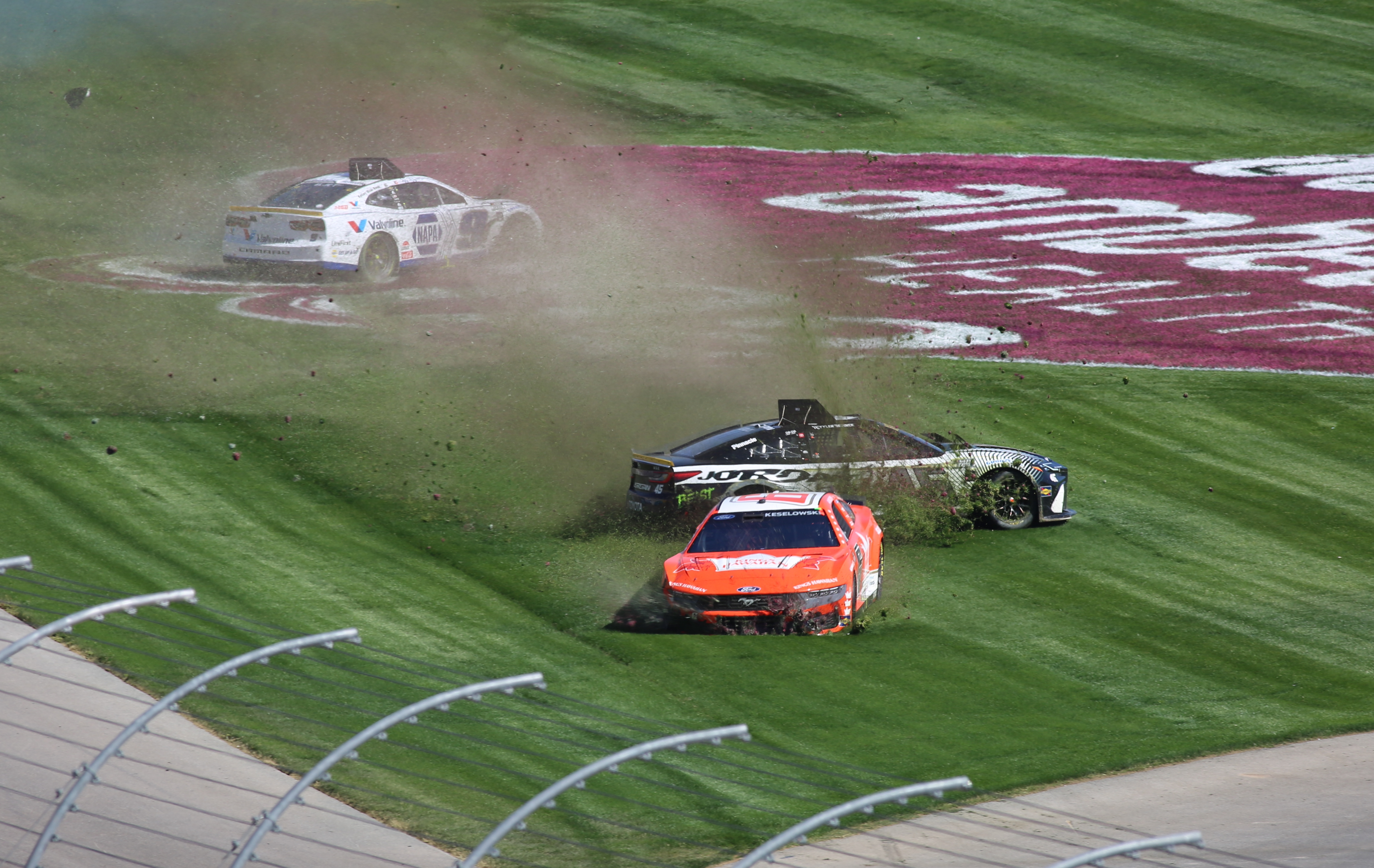
Tyler Reddick (middleground), Brad Keselowski (foreground) and Chase Elliott (background) all spinning through the grass at Las Vegas Motor Speedway before Reddick would eventually hook a curb in the infield and flip once before landing on his wheels. Keselowski later came back up onto the far-side of the track and was nearly struck by Austin Cindric and Ryan Blaney.

The Big One is a phrase describing any crash usually involving five or more cars in NASCAR, ARCA, F1, and IndyCar racing. It is most commonly used at Daytona International Speedway and Talladega Superspeedway, although occasionally seen at other tracks as well, such as Dover Motor Speedway and Watkins Glen International.

== Coining the phrase ==
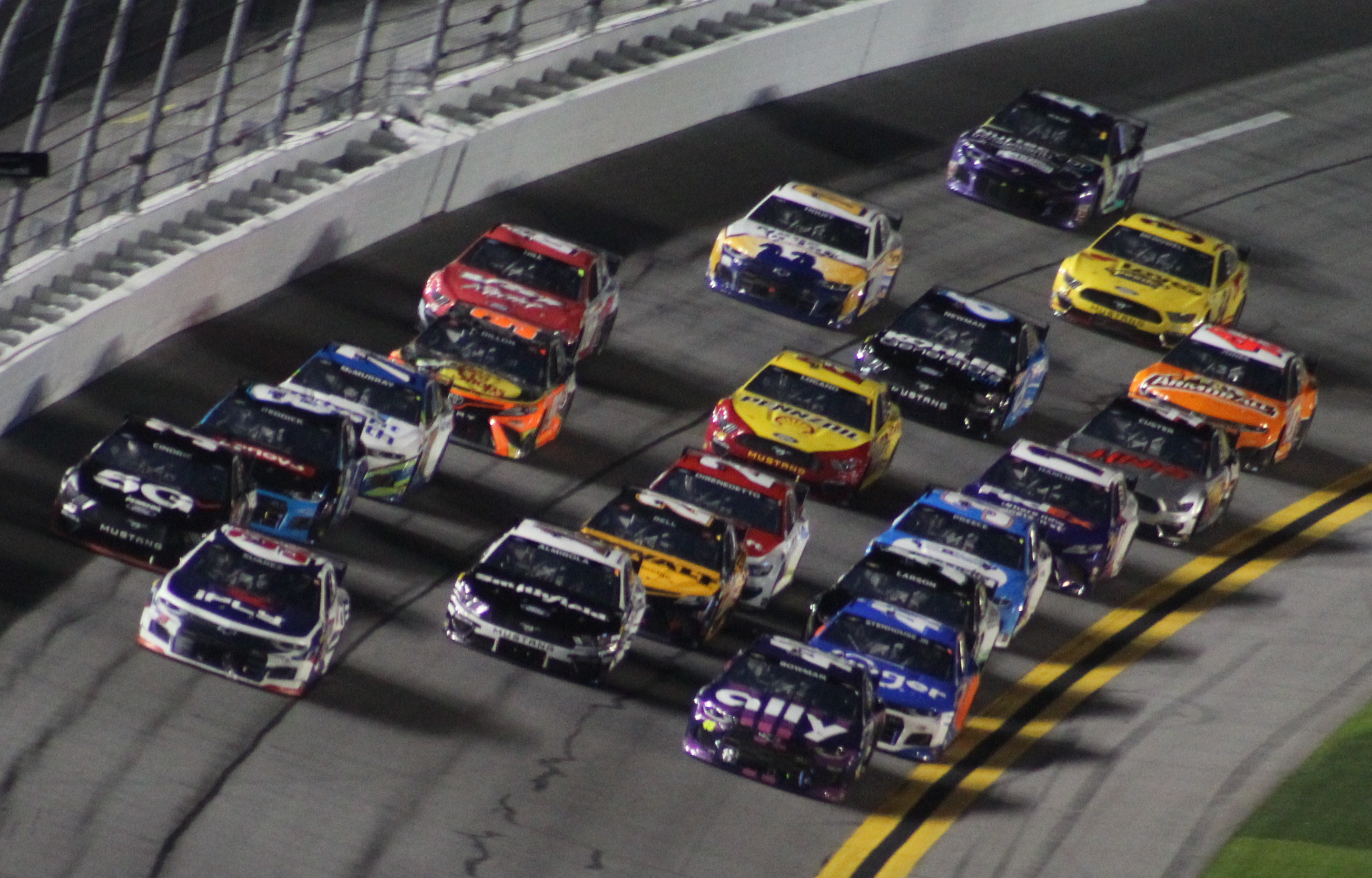
Typical three-wide pack during the 2021 Daytona 500.

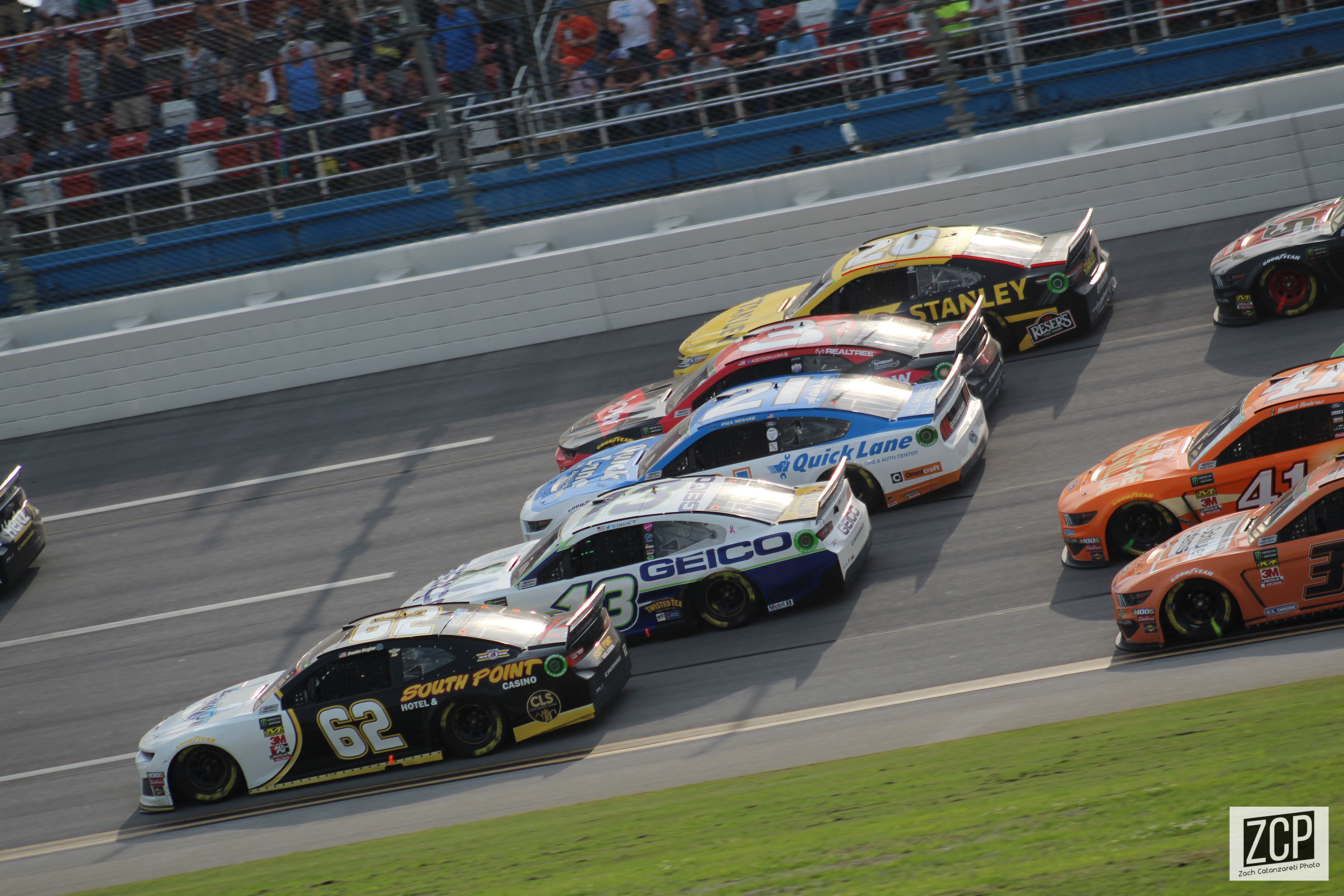
Five-wide pack at Talladega Superspeedway during the 2019 GEICO 500.

Until the 2000s, massive crashes were referred to as "major" or "terrific" crashes.

By the mid-1990s, competitors and media began taking note of the multi-car wrecks at Daytona and Talladega. In 1997, Dale Earnhardt described a final-lap crash at the 1997 Pepsi 400 as "the Big Wreck". News articles began using the term "Big Wreck" to describe such crashes in 1998, and by 1999, its use was widespread. Drivers began to openly admit they were apprehensive of its possibility.

One of the first times the term "The Big One" was used on-air was during the Winston 500 on ESPN October 11, 1998. Commentator Bob Jenkins said during the crash on lap 134 "This is the big one that we had hoped we would not have." One of the first published instances of the term "The Big One," was an April 18, 2000, article on ESPN.com about a crash in the DieHard 500. Benny Parsons also used the term on the air during that particular race when replays of the crash were being shown. The term was also being used informally by fans on message boards.

During the 2001 Daytona 500, Fox commentator Darrell Waltrip used the term on-air to describe an 18-car crash in the backstretch on lap 173, as saying "It's the big one, gang, it's the big one. It's what we've all been fearing in this kind of racing is going to happen."

By 2001, the phrase was widely used by competitors, fans, and in print and broadcast media. It soon became standard NASCAR vernacular, and it became a retronym to describe past such accidents as well.

The Big One has been the subject of criticism of NASCAR. Some have complained that the sanctioning body, promoters and media have celebrated the crashes.

By 2009, Talladega Superspeedway marketed itself on the notorious crashes with hot dogs, and later meatballs billed as "The Big One," with activities on Friday night after on-track action concludes billed as "The Big One on Talladega Boulevard".

== Examples ==
=== NASCAR Cup Series ===
- 2001 Daytona 500:
  - On the back straightaway on lap 173, fifth-place Robby Gordon got into the back of fourth-place Ward Burton, turning Burton left into third-place Tony Stewart's right rear. Stewart's car went straight into the wall, catching air, landing on its side on top of Gordon's car, and tumbling across the track while getting hit by other cars. The car briefly landed on top of Joe Gibbs Racing teammate Bobby Labonte before falling onto the track and rolling to a stop in the infield grass. Burton's and Stewart's cars blocked the track, starting a chain reaction crash that collected 18 cars in total, including Burton, Stewart, Labonte, Gordon, Rusty Wallace, Steve Park, Terry Labonte, Mark Martin, Jerry Nadeau, Jason Leffler, Elliott Sadler, John Andretti, Jeff Burton, Andy Houston, Jeff Gordon, Kenny Wallace, Buckshot Jones, and Dale Jarrett. This crash, however, was later overshadowed by Dale Earnhardt's fatal crash on the last lap. Incidentally, Earnhardt had narrowly escaped being caught up in the lap 173 crash, nearly being hit by the spinning Ward Burton.
- 2002 Daytona 500:
  - Second-place Kevin Harvick attempted to block the advancing Jeff Gordon going into turn one on lap 149, resulting in the two making contact and Harvick being spun down to the apron. Harvick slid up the track, hit the wall, and slid back down the track, collecting an additional 17 cars (18 in total). Matt Kenseth, Ricky Rudd, Ken Schrader, John Andretti, Kenny Wallace, Casey Atwood, Johnny Benson Jr., Bobby Labonte, Jeremy Mayfield, Joe Nemechek, Mike Wallace, Jimmie Johnson, Bobby Hamilton, Todd Bodine, Dave Blaney, Jerry Nadeau, and Dale Earnhardt Jr. (his third incident in the race). Eventual race winner Ward Burton barely made it to the inside of the spinning Harvick to avoid the crash.
- 2002 Aaron's 499:
  - On lap 164, Jimmie Johnson shuffled Kyle Petty out of line in turn 1. Coming on to the backstretch, Petty found a spot in line, but the whole field stacked up behind him, causing Mike Wallace to force Tony Stewart against the outside wall, causing a crash that collected 23 cars: Wallace, Stewart, Steve Park, Rusty Wallace, Terry Labonte, Mark Martin, Casey Atwood, Bill Elliott, Johnny Benson Jr., Matt Kenseth, Bobby Labonte, Jeremy Mayfield, Elliott Sadler, Kevin Harvick, Robby Gordon, Ricky Craven, Jimmy Spencer, John Andretti, Steve Grissom, Bobby Hamilton, Dave Blaney, Geoff Bodine, and Ricky Rudd. Sadler took the biggest hit in the wreck by slamming the corner of the inside wall on the right side, while Benson had to be pulled out of his car after it caught fire on pit road. However, all of the drivers involved escaped injury.
- 2003 Aaron's 499:
  - On lap 4, entering turn one, Ryan Newman blew a tire, bounced off Mark Martin, and smashed hard into the turn one wall, almost turning over. One of Newman's tires came off as he spun back down the track, and the tire bounced off Ricky Rudd's hood, causing it to bounce over the catch fence and land in a restricted access area outside the track. Mayhem ensued as cars checked up behind attempting to avoid Newman, who spun across the middle of the track, resulting the largest recorded wreck in modern Cup Series competition until the 2024 YellaWood 500. The crash collected a total of 27 cars, the others being Jack Sprague, Jerry Nadeau, Hermie Sadler, Mike Wallace, Steve Park, Rusty Wallace, Mike Skinner, Mark Martin, Jimmy Spencer, eventual race winner Dale Earnhardt Jr., Johnny Benson Jr., Greg Biffle, Matt Kenseth, Bobby Labonte, Tony Stewart, Jeff Green, Casey Mears, Jamie McMurray, John Andretti, Kyle Petty, Ken Schrader, Todd Bodine, Dave Blaney, Dale Jarrett, and Jeff Burton.
- 2005 Aaron's 499:
  - On lap 132, Mike Wallace, Jimmie Johnson and Dale Earnhardt Jr. got together in the tri-oval near pit road exit, forcing Scott Riggs and Wallace to careen into the wall hard, and collecting 23 other cars (25 in all): Kyle Busch, Dave Blaney, Mark Martin, Ryan Newman, Matt Kenseth, Bobby Labonte, Rusty Wallace, Ricky Rudd, Kasey Kahne, Mike Bliss, Mike Skinner, Brian Vickers, Scott Wimmer, Bobby Hamilton Jr., Kerry Earnhardt, Sterling Marlin, Jeff Green, Jason Leffler, Boris Said, Casey Mears, Joe Nemechek, and Carl Edwards. Fox studio analyst Jeff Hammond estimated the total damage at $8 million. The race was red-flagged for about 43 minutes for extensive cleanup.
- 2007 UAW-Ford 500:
  - On lap 144, Bobby Labonte appeared to have a tire go down at the very top of the racetrack. He then went down the hill and collected about 8-9 more cars, including championship contenders Matt Kenseth and Kyle Busch. Others involved included: Jamie McMurray, David Ragan, Paul Menard, Robby Gordon, Brian Vickers, and David Reutimann.

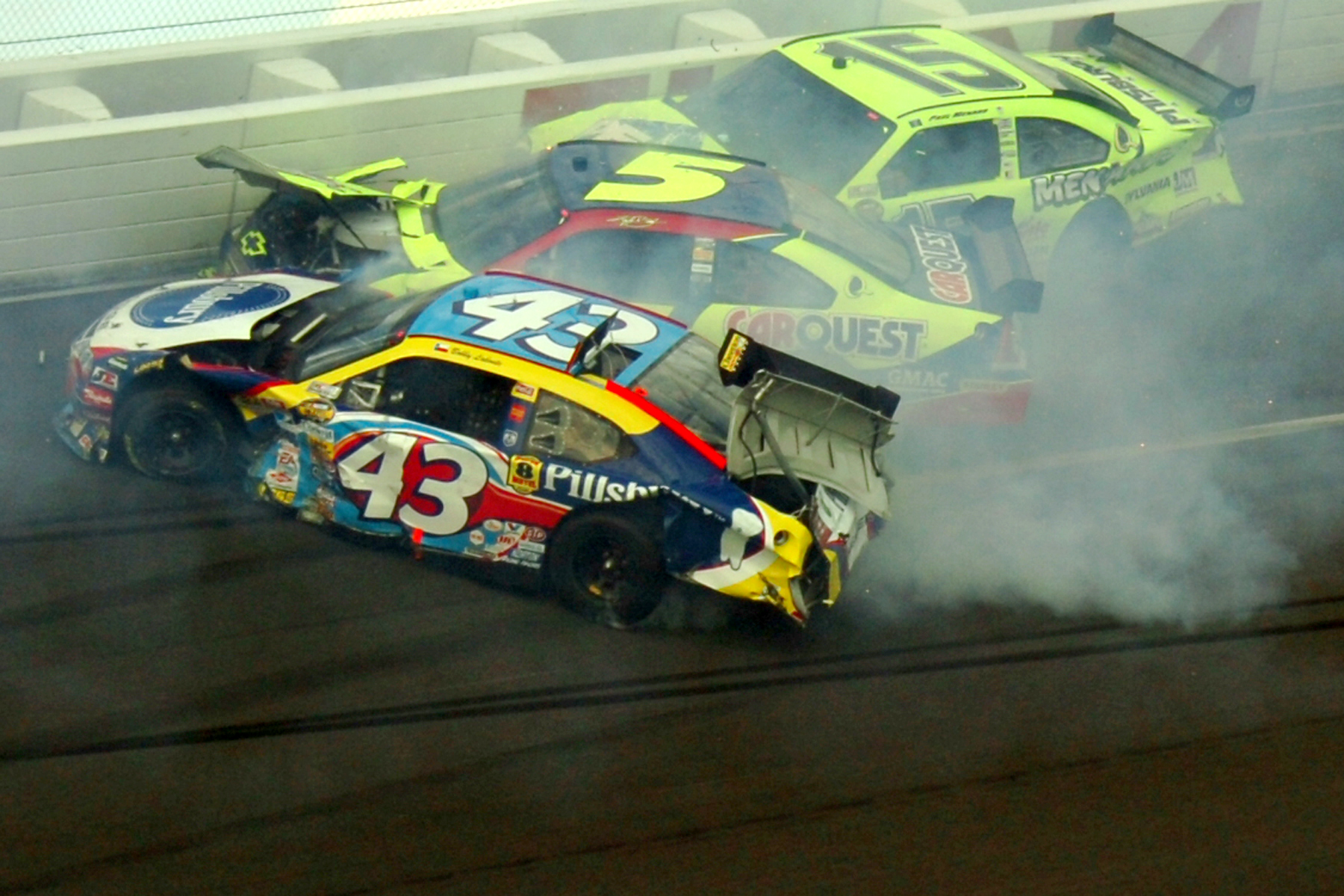
An example of the Big One at the 2007 UAW-Ford 500.

- 2008 AMP Energy 500:
  - On Lap 68, Brian Vickers blew a right front tire down the front stretch and collecting nine cars: Kasey Kahne, Martin Truex Jr., David Gilliland, Mike Skinner, Jamie McMurray, Terry Labonte, Tony Raines and Aric Almirola.
  - With 16 laps to go, Roush teammates Carl Edwards, Greg Biffle, and Matt Kenseth got together while racing three-wide for second place, triggering a 12-car pile-up in turn 3, which took out Juan Pablo Montoya, Dale Earnhardt Jr., Kevin Harvick, Michael Waltrip, Kyle Busch, and many more.
- 2010 Coke Zero 400:
  - On lap 148, Kurt Busch got into Jeff Burton, and turned him into Sam Hornish Jr. Behind them, Juan Pablo Montoya turned Brad Keselowski into Reed Sorenson and Jimmie Johnson. The smoke from these incidents reduced visibility to the point that a large portion of the field was collected behind them, leading to a red flag. Mark Martin pounded the outside wall and caught fire until he got to pit road, where fellow pit crew members pulled him out of his car. In all, 20 cars were involved: Ryan Newman, Bobby Labonte; Hornish Jr., Robby Gordon, Scott Speed, Greg Biffle, Paul Menard, Kurt Busch, Juan Pablo Montoya, Brad Keselowski, Regan Smith, Sorenson, Johnson, Joey Logano, Martin, Marcos Ambrose, and Stewart.
- 2012 Good Sam Roadside Assistance 500:
  - On lap 189, the last lap of a green-white-checker restart following Jamie McMurray's spin with five laps to go, Tony Stewart tried to block the advancing draft of Michael Waltrip and Casey Mears in turn four. As Stewart moved down to block Waltrip, he was passed on the outside by Matt Kenseth (the only car ahead of the crash; would go on to win the race). Stewart came across the front of Waltrip's car, turned sideways, and spun up into the pack, collecting 24 other cars (25 in all): Waltrip, Mears, Kevin Harvick, Marcos Ambrose, Sam Hornish Jr., Aric Almirola, Jimmie Johnson, Dale Earnhardt Jr., Paul Menard, Clint Bowyer, David Ragan, Regan Smith, Dave Blaney, Jeff Burton, Kasey Kahne, Brad Keselowski, Bobby Labonte, Martin Truex Jr., David Gilliland, Terry Labonte, Landon Cassill, Denny Hamlin, Jeff Gordon, and Kyle Busch. Stewart's car went upside down and landed on top of Kahne, Menard, and Bowyer before flipping back over and coming to rest at the exit of turn four. Gordon and Kyle Busch escaped the wreck on the apron with only minor damage to finish in second and third place, respectively. Most of the cars were caught in the initial pileup; however, five cars (Keselowski, Truex, Bobby Labonte, Cassill, and Gilliland) were swept up as the others cars began the spin down into the infield and another (Hamlin) spun out by himself and sustained front-end damage. Travis Kvapil, Greg Biffle, and Ryan Newman avoided the wreck at the back of the pack to take top-ten finishes. Following this crash, Earnhardt Jr., who had taken a few hard hits in the crash, was diagnosed with a concussion, requiring him to sit out the next two races (Charlotte and Kansas). He was replaced by Regan Smith at both of them.
- 2014 Sprint Unlimited:
  - On lap 36, going through the tri-oval, Matt Kenseth attempted to move to the inside to carry his momentum around the slightly slower car of Brad Keselowski; however, he didn't have enough room and was turned by Joey Logano. As Kenseth came back up the track, he collected Tony Stewart, Jeff Gordon, Carl Edwards, Kurt Busch, and Ricky Stenhouse Jr. Stewart and Gordon ended up pinned against the wall, with Busch's front end under Gordon's car and Stenhouse's front end under Busch's car. Danica Patrick spun out while trying to miss both the larger crash and the spinning car of Edwards, but she did not hit anything. As her car came to a stop, she was t-boned by the accelerating Stenhouse, who couldn't see because of front-end damage and was trying to make it back to the garage. Kevin Harvick was also involved in the crash, but his damage was only from running through debris.
- 2015 Coke Zero 400:
  - On lap 3, David Gilliland tried to drop in behind Dale Earnhardt Jr. on the inside line, failing to see Clint Bowyer, and got turned around by Bowyer, and collected an additional ten cars, including Michael Annett, Greg Biffle, Sam Hornish Jr., Bobby Labonte, Joey Logano, and Danica Patrick.
  - On lap 105, Matt Kenseth got loose in front of Kasey Kahne out of turn 4. Kenseth's car then washed up the track, collecting nine additional cars, including Aric Almirola, Kyle Larson, Martin Truex Jr., Jamie McMurray, Brad Keselowski, Joey Logano, Sam Hornish Jr., David Ragan, and Trevor Bayne.
  - On lap 161, the final lap of a green-white-checker finish, second place Denny Hamlin got tapped by Kevin Harvick, spinning him in front of the 27-car lead pack as they crossed the finish line. Hamlin drifted back up into traffic and was hit by Austin Dillon, causing Dillon's car to fly over two other rows of cars, flip, and hit the catch fence. The crash collected 25 cars: Hamlin, Kevin Harvick, Jeff Gordon, Kyle Busch, David Ragan, Matt Kenseth, Matt DiBenedetto, A. J. Allmendinger, Greg Biffle, Brett Moffitt, Landon Cassill, Alex Bowman, Justin Allgaier, Ricky Stenhouse Jr., Cole Whitt, Austin Dillon, Jamie McMurray, Ryan Newman, Brad Keselowski, Joey Logano, Casey Mears, Paul Menard, Tony Stewart, Trevor Bayne, and Brendan Gaughan, with the only uninvolved cars from the lead pack being race winner Dale Earnhardt Jr., second place Jimmie Johnson, and fifth place Kurt Busch. Twenty-four cars from the lead pack, as well as the trailing car of Brad Keselowski, were swept up in the melee. The crash occurred after the cars crossed the finish line, as Hamlin finished third and Harvick fourth, while Dillon finished seventh.
- 2016 GEICO 500:
  - On lap 96, Austin Dillon got turned into the outside wall by the car of David Gilliland, and in the ensuing check-up Jimmie Johnson spun out, and Chris Buescher flipped several times down the backstretch. Also involved were Jamie McMurray, Carl Edwards, and Michael Annett.
  - On lap 161, Kurt Busch attempted to give Johnson a push going into turn 1, which sent Johnson into the outside wall and back into traffic, collecting an additional twenty cars, including Greg Biffle, Kyle Larson, Dillon (his second crash of the afternoon, as was Johnson's), Ryan Blaney, Denny Hamlin, and Ryan Newman.
  - On lap 181, Michael McDowell bumped into Danica Patrick, sending her into Matt Kenseth, sending Kenseth into the air and the inside wall before he flipped back over. While this took place, McDowell slid up into the outside, catching Aric Almirola, sending him spinning down into Joey Logano. This crash involved 12 cars, many of whom had already taken damage from the lap 161 crash.
  - On the last lap, headed through the tri-oval, when Landon Cassill hooked Cole Whitt into Kevin Harvick, sending Harvick into the outside wall and into Ricky Stenhouse Jr., putting Harvick on his side before landing back on four wheels. Also collected were Martin Truex Jr. and A. J. Allmendinger as Brad Keselowski crossed the line to take the win. In total, 35 of the 40 cars received some damage during the race, and the first lapped car at the end of the race was Johnson, who finished six laps behind in 22nd.
- 2016 AAA 400 Drive for Autism:
  - On a restart on lap 354, race leader Jimmie Johnson was unable to get his car into third gear and was rear ended by Martin Truex Jr., stacking up the field behind him. A total of 18 cars were collected in the wreck. In addition to Johnson and Truex Jr., Kevin Harvick, Jamie McMurray, Ryan Newman, A. J. Allmendinger, Ricky Stenhouse Jr., Kyle Busch, Aric Almirola, Denny Hamlin, Greg Biffle, Casey Mears, Dale Earnhardt Jr., Clint Bowyer, Trevor Bayne, Paul Menard, and Michael McDowell were involved.
- 2017 Daytona 500:
  - On lap 129, Jimmie Johnson went from the outside lane to block Trevor Bayne on the inside, as a result, Johnson was spun around, collecting 17 cars including Denny Hamlin, Clint Bowyer, Chris Buescher, Danica Patrick, Parker Kligerman, among many others.
  - On lap 143, after Chase Elliott almost went around in front of the field, Jamie McMurray was turned around, collecting 11 cars including Brad Keselowski, Jeffrey Earnhardt, Ryan Newman, Daniel Suárez, Landon Cassill and Ty Dillon.
- 2017 GEICO 500:
  - On Lap 169, as A. J. Allmendinger tried to bump draft Chase Elliott down the backstretch, Allmendinger inadvertently rammed into Elliott, and both cars went airborne off Turn 2, turning Allmendinger over (after contact from Joey Logano), and collected an additional 15 cars including Erik Jones, Trevor Bayne, Austin Dillon, Matt Kenseth, and Danica Patrick. Others in the wreck, including Brad Keselowski, were able to beat the five-minute crash clock under NASCAR's new damaged vehicle policy to rally and finish 7th in the race. The race was red-flagged while crews extricated Allmendinger from his car.
- 2017 Alabama 500:
  - On Lap 171, entering turn 3, Martin Truex Jr. tried to go four wide and clipped David Ragan, causing Ragan to spin into Kurt Busch and Jimmie Johnson and collect an additional 16 cars including Kyle Busch, Kevin Harvick, Matt Kenseth, Austin Dillon, Landon Cassill, Dale Earnhardt Jr., Matt DiBenedetto, Danica Patrick, Ty Dillon, Ricky Stenhouse Jr., Brendan Gaughan, and Michael McDowell. Denny Hamlin and race winner Brad Keselowski were among a few lucky drivers to drive through the crash unscathed. Earnhardt Jr. spun into the infield grass at the start of the crash, but avoided contact with other cars and was able to recover to finish 7th in his final restrictor plate start. This resulted in a lengthy red flag for cleanup.
- 2018 Daytona 500:
  - On Lap 60 coming to the end of stage one, Ricky Stenhouse Jr. was clipped by Ryan Blaney, although Stenhouse was able to regain control, Erik Jones got loose behind him and spun around, collecting 9 cars in total including William Byron, Ty Dillon, Jimmie Johnson, Martin Truex Jr., Kyle Larson, and Daniel Suárez.
  - On lap 103, Brad Keselowski and Chase Elliott made slight contact, sending Elliott into the wall spinning wildly collecting seven cars in total, including Danica Patrick (in her final NASCAR race), Kevin Harvick, Kasey Kahne, David Ragan, and Martin Truex Jr.
  - On lap 199, Kurt Busch was unable to block Ryan Blaney from passing him, resulting in Busch spinning and collecting 10 additional cars, which included Matt DiBenedetto, Martin Truex Jr., Ricky Stenhouse Jr., Brendan Gaughan, Alex Bowman, Jeffrey Earnhardt, Ryan Newman, A. J. Allmendinger, Bubba Wallace, and Joey Logano.
- 2018 Coke Zero Sugar 400:
  - On Lap 54, on the backstretch, William Byron blocked Brad Keselowski, causing him to slow. Ricky Stenhouse Jr., however, failed to do the same, ramming into Keselowski's bumper and sending him into the outside wall and collecting 26 cars. This was one of two big wrecks set off by Stenhouse, who would later have to be escorted by security after the race for protection due to the negative backlash.
  - On lap 65, following the restart for the previous crash, Stenhouse attempted to side draft Kyle Busch, resulting in Stenhouse Jr. clipping Busch and shooting his car up into the wall, collecting seven cars in total, including William Byron, Trevor Bayne, Jamie McMurray, Erik Jones (who went on to win), and Corey LaJoie.
  - On lap 163, as Martin Truex Jr. was coming to take the white flag, Clint Bowyer was turned by Bubba Wallace, causing 10 other cars to crash behind him including Kevin Harvick, Matt DiBenedetto, Jimmie Johnson, Ray Black Jr., Ryan Newman, Ross Chastain, Trevor Bayne, Ricky Stenhouse Jr., Brendan Gaughan, and Alex Bowman.
- 2018 Bank of America Roval 400:
  - On a restart, Brad Keselowski went too hard into Turn 1, collecting William Byron, Paul Menard, Kyle Larson and Kyle Busch. Busch went up the track and Daniel Hemric was hit. Hemric spun and collected Trevor Bayne, Ty Dillon, Aric Almirola, Bubba Wallace, Michael McDowell, eventual race winner Ryan Blaney, Ryan Newman, and Ross Chastain.
- 2019 Advance Auto Parts Clash:
  - On lap 55, Jimmie Johnson attempted to pass Paul Menard for the lead entering turn 3. However, the two drivers made contact and Menard spun out across the track, triggering a 16-car wreck that also involved Kyle Busch, Martin Truex Jr., Brad Keselowski, Kyle Larson, Jamie McMurray, Ryan Newman, Daniel Suárez, Denny Hamlin, Clint Bowyer, Kevin Harvick, Erik Jones, Chase Elliott, Aric Almirola, and Austin Dillon. Shortly after the wreck, the race was called short due to rain, and Johnson was declared the winner.
- 2019 Daytona 500:
  - On lap 190, Paul Menard clipped Matt DiBenedetto and caused a 21-car crash which involved the likes of defending Cup Series champion Joey Logano, Martin Truex Jr., Jimmie Johnson, and Chase Elliott, among others.
- 2020 Daytona 500:
  - With 17 laps to go, Joey Logano attempted to push Aric Almirola forward down the backstretch into Brad Keselowski. Keselowski lost control of his car upon contact, and a 19-car wreck ensued that also involved Martin Truex Jr., Bubba Wallace, Alex Bowman, Tyler Reddick, Matt DiBenedetto, Ross Chastain, Austin Dillon, Kurt Busch, Justin Haley, Ryan Blaney, Ty Dillon, Chris Buescher, Brendan Gaughan, John Hunter Nemechek, and Jimmie Johnson, who was racing in his last Daytona 500. Kyle Busch also dropped out at that point, but he was not part of the wreck; his engine died. This wreck brought out the first of two red flags not caused by rain and was overshadowed by Ryan Newman’s fiery crash on the final lap of the race.
- 2020 O'Reilly Auto Parts 500:
  - On lap 219, Ryan Blaney had checked up on turn 3 off of a restart. That incident had bunched up the field and on the frontstretch, Aric Almirola had tapped Martin Truex Jr. and he flung across the track into the inside wall. Behind the spinning Truex, several cars had gotten into the grass kicking up dirt and debris and virtually blocking up the track. There were 12 cars involved in this wreck, the others being Kyle Busch, Chris Buescher, Matt Kenseth, Cole Custer, Kurt Busch, William Byron, Ryan Preece, Ricky Stenhouse Jr., Bubba Wallace, and Kevin Harvick.
- 2021 Daytona 500:
  - On lap 13, Christopher Bell bumped Aric Almirola which turned him into Alex Bowman on the backstretch. 14 other cars were collected, those being Kurt Busch, Ryan Newman, Tyler Reddick, Ryan Blaney, Chris Buescher, Martin Truex Jr., Matt DiBenedetto, William Byron, David Ragan, Anthony Alfredo, Erik Jones, Jamie McMurray, and Daniel Suárez.
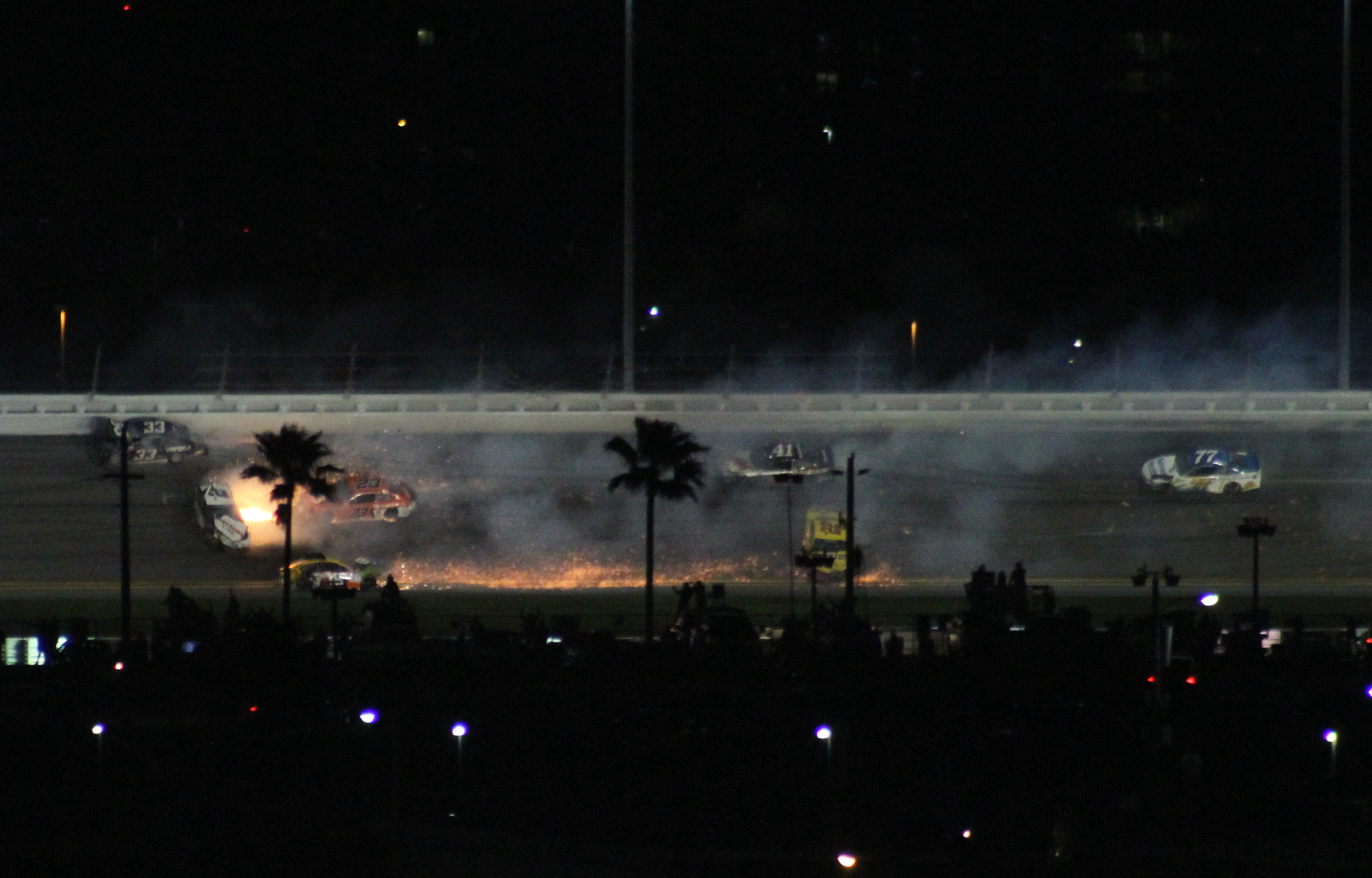
  - An example of the Big One at the 2021 Daytona 500.
    On the last lap, Brad Keselowski attempted to pass Joey Logano on the backstretch but the two collided, creating a fiery crash sending Keselowski into the catchfence and collecting Kyle Busch, Bubba Wallace, Austin Cindric, Kyle Larson, Ryan Preece, Ross Chastain, and Cole Custer. Michael McDowell, who was third at the time, dodged the final lap crash to win his first career victory under caution as well as earning Front Row Motorsports' third Cup victory.
- 2021 Coke Zero Sugar 400:
  - On lap 145, during a major check up, Martin Truex Jr. turned into the backstretch wall after trying to block Ricky Stenhouse Jr. and made contact with William Byron. Then Truex Jr turned left and was rear ended by Tyler Reddick. Other cars involved were Daniel Suárez, Landon Cassill, Chase Briscoe, and Anthony Alfredo.
  - On lap 156, entering turn 4, Matt DiBenedetto getting a push from Denny Hamlin, got himself loose and brought him, Hamlin, and Chase Elliott up towards the wall, and collected an additional seven cars including Cole Custer, Brad Keselowski, Christopher Bell, Kyle Busch, Ross Chastain, Ricky Stenhouse Jr., and Ryan Preece. This crash sent the race into an overtime.
  - After a late race caution forcing an overtime to occur, Kurt Busch hooked Daniel Suárez and Kevin Harvick in turn 3, causing a fiery crash similar to the 2021 Daytona 500 earlier in the year. This crash involved Austin Dillon, Corey LaJoie, Ross Chastain, Erik Jones, Ryan Preece, and Kyle Larson.
- 2022 Coke Zero Sugar 400:
  - With 24 to go, rain began to fall in turns 1 and 2. Race control did not realize it until it was too late. With 23 to go, a big one struck in turn 1 and causing the 7th and final caution of the race. Denny Hamlin, Daniel Suárez, Daniel Hemric, and Justin Haley all got sideways at the exact same time and all spun and the wreck collected a total of 18 cars including a majority of the top 20. Cars slid and spun everywhere due to the lack of grip on the pavement of the track. The wreck collected Kevin Harvick, Tyler Reddick, Chase Elliott, Aric Almirola, Denny Hamlin, Daniel Hemric, Chris Buescher, Kyle Busch, Harrison Burton, Bubba Wallace, Justin Haley, Todd Gilliland, Ty Dillon, Erik Jones, Ricky Stenhouse Jr., Cody Ware, Noah Gragson, and Daniel Suárez. The red flag was soon issued for the weather and lasted for nearly 3 hours and 20 minutes before the race could restart. There were only 17 cars left on track when the race restarted with 16 laps to go. Eventual winner Austin Dillon was in the lead pack when the crash started, but managed to weave his way through unscathed.
- 2024 YellaWood 500:
  - During the final round of pit stops, leader Todd Gilliland pit with most Ford drivers on Lap 172. On his way to pit lane, he was penalized for speeding while entering pit lane, and was given a pass-through penalty, which he served solo, which tends to be a huge disadvantage at drafting circuits, on Lap 174. Without drafting help, he was considerably slower than the drafting pack. On Lap 184, Gilliland was low when the pack led primarily by Fords on the low side and Chevrolets on the high side (Austin Cindric leading low and Ricky Stenhouse Jr. leading high) passed him. As a result of the overtaking, the lead Ford was separated from the other Fords in the low line, splitting the field considerably. As Chase Briscoe passed Gilliland, the wake of the car on the side lead him to bump Harrison Burton, who bumped into Joey Logano, and bumped Brad Keselowski. Keselowski, who was considerably behind Cindric, had a "slam draft" situation where his front bumper and Cindric's rear bumper are not flush (a notorious advantage of Fords with their square noses), slamming Cindric on the backstretch. Cindric's car made contact with the leader of the high line draft, Stenhouse, damaging his door panel, while Cindric's car made contact with Chase Elliott, whose Chevrolet was on the high side. Then Cindric's car hit the low line of Fords led by Joey Logano, which lead to a 28-car crash. The drivers involved were Cindric, Stenhouse, Elliott, Logano, Gilliland, Tyler Reddick, Alex Bowman, Michael McDowell, Chris Buescher, A. J. Allmendinger, Harrison Burton, John Hunter Nemechek, Chase Briscoe, Bubba Wallace, Noah Gragson, Daniel Suárez, Corey LaJoie, Josh Berry, Carson Hocevar, Anthony Alfredo, Zane Smith, Martin Truex Jr., Shane van Gisbergen, Christopher Bell, Erik Jones, Daniel Hemric, Kyle Busch (who hit the wall but did not contact other cars trying to avoid the melee), and Ryan Preece, making it the largest Big One in modern NASCAR Cup Series history. This put the race under a ten lap safety car period that followed an eight-minute red flag, and would then send it into overtime. Stenhouse won despite the damage on his door panel.
- 2025 Quaker State 400 presented by Walmart:
  - During the race's second stage, Denny Hamlin made contact with John Hunter Nemechek as the pack raced down the backstretch. Nemechek's No. 42 Camry bounced off the outside wall, then Hamlin's No. 11 Camry fishtailed in front of the field, starting a 26-car pileup. After the initial collisions, the entire track was blocked by sliding machinery. There was little that drivers further behind could do other than skid into the carnage. Race officials were forced to throw a red flag because there was no way for the surviving cars behind the pace car to maneuver around the clean-up efforts. Drivers involved: Hamlin, Nemechek, Ross Chastain, Daniel Suárez, Chase Briscoe, Joey Logano, William Byron, Austin Cindric, Corey LaJoie, Josh Berry, Noah Gragson, Bubba Wallace, Kyle Busch, Austin Dillon, Cody Ware, Brad Keselowski, Ryan Preece, Cole Custer, Alex Bowman, Erik Jones, B. J. McLeod, Carson Hocevar, Connor Zilisch, Ty Dillon, Michael McDowell, and David Starr.
- 2026 Daytona 500
  - On Lap 112, Denny Hamlin tapped Justin Allgaier off turn 4, triggering a 17-car pileup.
- 2026 Jack Link's 500
  - In the backstretch during the second stage, leader Bubba Wallace briefly separated from the pack on Lap 115. As the pack caught Wallace, a bump from Ross Chastain sent him into the outer lanes where he hit Cole Custer, before then hitting the wall, triggering a large crash. The race would be red flagged as a result of the crash. Wallace would instantly retire along with Ryan Blaney, Cole Custer, Joey Logano, and defending champion Kyle Larson, with William Byron and Josh Berry retiring a few laps after the others. Ty Gibbs would attempt to continue the race with significant damage, but would hit the wall from a blown tire on Lap 124 that was speculated to be caused by damage from the prior wreck, leading to him also retiring. The crash officially collected 26 drivers, with some unofficial numbers being slightly higher. Drivers involved in the crash included Austin Cindric, Austin Dillon, Larson, Brad Keselowski, Daniel Suárez, Kyle Busch, Denny Hamlin, Blaney, Chase Briscoe, Berry, Logano, Wallace, Byron, Jesse Love, Custer, John Hunter Nemechek, Erik Jones, Joey Gase, Tyler Reddick, Cody Ware, Gibbs, Chad Finchum, Michael McDowell, Carson Hocevar, Daniel Dye, Connor Zilisch, and Shane van Gisbergen.

=== O'Reilly Auto Parts Series ===
- 1999 Touchstone Energy 300:
  - On lap 68, a massive melee involving 23 cars erupted in turn one. It started when Kelly Denton rammed into Ken Schrader, spinning Schrader four times before his car burst into flames. Behind the small initial incident, the other 22 cars in a separate pack stacked up and triggered a large pileup when Mike Dillon blew a tire.
- 2002 Aaron's 312 at Talladega:
  - On lap 14, the largest crash in modern NASCAR history (1972–present) took place at the exit of turn two, with 31 cars being involved. Three cars (Stacy Compton, Jason Keller, and Kenny Wallace) had cleared pole-sitter Johnny Sauter as the field started down the back-straightaway. Scott Riggs (fourth on the outside) tried to pass Wallace on the outside, but checked up, causing Shane Hmiel to get in the back of him. Subsequently, Kevin Grubb bumped Hmiel, causing both Riggs and Hmiel to turn sideways down the track and hit the right-rear of Sauter and the right-front of Joe Nemechek, respectively. The impact from Riggs' car caused Sauter's car to turn sideways and flip twice in the middle of the track, thus blocking the track and causing a massive pile-up behind. The drivers involved were Riggs, Hmiel, Grubb, Sauter, Nemechek, Todd Bodine, Larry Foyt, Jack Sprague, Jeff Purvis, Jimmy Kitchens, Randy Lajoie, Kerry Earnhardt, Tony Raines, Bobby Hamilton Jr., Ashton Lewis, Mike McLaughlin, Lyndon Amick, Greg Biffle, Jamie McMurray, Scott Wimmer, Ron Hornaday Jr., Shane Hall, Tim Sauter, Jay Sauter, Michael Waltrip, Joe Ruttman, Jimmy Spencer, Mike Wallace, Mike Harmon, Jeff Fuller, and Coy Gibbs. At the time of the crash, 41 of the 43 cars were on the track. Of those, only Compton, Keller, and Wallace (who were in front of the crash) and C.W. Smith, Hank Parker Jr., Casey Mears, Andy Kirby, Tim Fedewa, Larry Gunselman, and Chad Chaffin (all of whom either got slowed down in time to miss the crash or had lost the lead draft altogether and were elsewhere on the track) made it through without damage. This crash brought out a 40-minute red flag and caused one minor injury to Mike Harmon (required stitches for biting through his tongue).
- 2008 Aaron's 312:
  - On lap 70, Kevin Lepage had returned to the track following a pit stop and merged onto the track right in front of the field. A few of the lead cars went around Lepage on the outside, but Carl Edwards ran over the back end of Lepage's car, causing Edwards to catch air and set off a 15-car pile up, including Kyle Busch, David Reutimann, Reed Sorenson, Brad Keselowski, Cale Gale, Patrick Carpentier, Mike Wallace, Kenny Wallace, Steve Wallace, Marcos Ambrose, Stephen Leicht, Kyle Krisiloff, and Kelly Bires.
- 2012 DRIVE4COPD 300:
  - In turn 4 on the last lap, leader Kurt Busch attempted to block the two two-car drafts of Joey Logano and Trevor Bayne, and Tony Stewart and Elliott Sadler, both of whom had runs on Busch and drafting partner Kyle Busch. They all made contact, with Kurt Busch ending up sideways against the outside wall, Stewart and Sadler being pinned to the wall by Bayne, and Logano being sent spinning across the track as a result of left-rear contact with Kurt Busch's sideways car. Kyle Busch and Ricky Stenhouse Jr. both moved to the bottom of the track, but Stenhouse turned Busch into the outside wall as they tried to miss the spinning Logano. A similar fate befell Kasey Kahne and Cole Whitt (who were just behind Busch and Stenhouse), with Kahne moving down into and spinning Whitt. Brad Keselowski, who was behind Whitt, received contact from Kahne and Whitt, causing his car to become out of control. James Buescher, who was 11th when the crash started, got through the crash on the track apron and slipped around Keselowski (as he was trying to regain control of his car) to win, followed by Sadler and Keselowski.
- 2013 DRIVE4COPD 300:
  - In the trioval, coming to the checkered flag on lap 120, leader Regan Smith was turned into the outside wall by second-place Brad Keselowski. Chaos ensued behind as 14 out of the 15 lead cars crashed in total. After hitting Smith, Keselowski himself was turned around by Sam Hornish Jr. and went up the track in front of Kyle Larson, with Larson being turned sideways after he was hit in the back by Dale Earnhardt Jr. Larson pushed Keselowski's car right-side first into the wall just as two cars (Brian Scott and Justin Allgaier) from behind this crash impacted the right side Larson's car after they had hit the spinning Regan Smith, causing Larson's car to go airborne and fly up into the catchfence. The front tires and the engine of his car were torn out and landed on the spectator side of the fence as part the fence was torn down by the impact of Larson's car. Simultaneously, Elliott Sadler impacted Regan Smith's spinning car, almost causing it to go airborne as well. Also, past the start-finish line, Alex Bowman spun through the infield and across the track, making hard contact with the outside wall. After Bowman hit the wall, Earnhardt Jr. drove under him, jacking the rear of Bowman's car up in the air (very similar to Kyle Busch's crash in the 2009 Coke Zero 400 when Kasey Kahne drove under him). The drivers involved were Smith, Keselowski, Earnhardt, Hornish, Larson, Scott, Bowman, Sadler, Allgaier, Travis Pastrana, Parker Kligerman, Eric McClure, Robert Richardson Jr., and Nelson Piquet Jr. Race winner Tony Stewart cut down through the infield and back up on the track to escape the melee. 28 spectators were injured, 14 of whom were treated at the infield care center and 14 of whom were taken to nearby hospitals, including seven taken to Halifax Health Medical Center in Daytona Beach, six more being taken to Halifax Health Medical Center in Port Orange, and one being taken to another area hospital. Six of those spectators sustained serious injuries.
- 2018 PowerShares QQQ 300:
  - Lap 122: During a NASCAR overtime, on the back straightaway of one of the five overtimes that occurred during the race, Aric Almirola was turned into the outside wall by second-place Kyle Larson, triggering a massive 18 car melee that collected big names, including Justin Allgaier, Joey Logano, and Brandon Jones.
- 2018 Coca-Cola Firecracker 250:
  - On lap 83, in the middle of three wide racing, Austin Cindric attempted to move down and block Matt Tifft, resulting in Tifft spinning Cindric into the front of the field and soon barrel rolling after making contact with Tyler Reddick, collecting 17 cars in total including Daniel Hemric, Tyler Reddick, Joey Gase, Jeremy Clements, Alex Labbé, David Starr, Chad Finchum, Brandon Jones, Ryan Reed, Ray Black Jr., and Garrett Smithley.
- 2019 Circle K Firecracker 250:
  - On lap 74, amidst a battle going on mid-pack, Scott Lagasse Jr. was turned by Brandon Brown, Lagasse bounced off of the wall and collected 9 other cars, which included Chad Finchum, Shane Lee, Chris Cockrum, David Starr, Sheldon Creed, Christopher Bell, and B. J. McLeod.
  - On lap 88, Michael Annett was clipped and turned into the wall by Christopher Bell, this caused the field to stack up and 15 cars were collected in the crash, which included Joe Graf Jr., Josh Williams, Timmy Hill, Noah Gragson, A. J. Allmendinger, Austin Cindric, Cole Custer, Chad Finchum, Caesar Bacarella, and others.
- 2022 Beef. It's What's for Dinner. 300:
  - On Lap 120, the final lap, Myatt Snider got turned from behind as the field went down the backstretch of Daytona. The ensuing crash took out eight cars and sent Snider into the catch fence violently. The engine was separated from the car in order to absorb the impact of the severe crash. The crash collected Snider, Matt Mills, Jade Buford, Tommy Joe Martins, Anthony Alfredo, Jeb Burton, Landon Cassill, and Ty Gibbs.

=== NASCAR Craftsman Truck Series ===
- 2000 Daytona 250:
  - On lap 57, Kurt Busch and Rob Morgan made contact sending Geoff Bodine's No. 15 truck into the catchfence, destroying it in the process. The crash collected 12 other trucks.
- 2021 Chevrolet Silverado 250:
  - With 37 laps to go, Austin Hill received a push from Todd Gilliland which turned Hill into Zane Smith. Both drivers would hit the outside wall and go back into traffic, collecting 20 other trucks.
- 2022 NextEra Energy 250:
  - Coming to the white flag, Tyler Ankrum was turned after a late block from Christian Eckes, resulting in nearly 20 trucks crashing making it one of the biggest wrecks in the history of the NASCAR Craftsman Truck Series.

=== IndyCar Series ===
- 2001 zMax 500:
  - A huge 11-car pileup occurred on lap 54, sending Jack Miller to the hospital with a concussion. Miller's car was engulfed by flames and slammed by several other cars, leaving nothing but a shell of his car when he finally came to a stop near the start-finish line. It would be Miller's final race. The race was under yellow for 35 laps while workers cleaned the track. The inferno of flames was so bright that it was visible on satellite images from space.
- 2011 IZOD IndyCar World Championship:
  - On lap 11, Wade Cunningham clipped James Hinchcliffe and then made contact with J. R. Hildebrand, initiating a 15-vehicle collision that killed Dan Wheldon and seriously injured Hildebrand, Pippa Mann, and Will Power. Wheldon was racing at 220 mph (350 km/h) and struck Charlie Kimball while trying to avoid the collision, sending his car airborne. It flew a distance of about 325 ft (99 m) and hit the catch fence cockpit first before landing back on the racing surface and coming to a stop near the SAFER barrier. After Wheldon’s death was told to the participants, the race was abandoned.
- 2017 Rainguard Water Sealers 600:
  - After a series of incidents with both the INDYCAR (part of the race was run on one day, then the other half a few months later, largely due to a combination of rain, weepers, and a day-one crash between Conor Daly and Josef Newgarden that injured the latter) and NASCAR (rain and weepers) in 2016, Texas Motor Speedway officials repaved and reconfigured the circuit to reduce weeper issues. On lap 152, Tony Kanaan made contact with James Hinchcliffe, triggering a major collision that forced seven other drivers to leave the race. During the ensuing red flag that followed, INDYCAR officials and Bridgestone engineers agreed to use competition cautions and mandatory tire changes for the remainder of the race in response to continuing issues with blistering tires from the repaved circuit. Kanaan was assessed a 20-second hold penalty for his role in the crash.
- 2021 Honda Indy Grand Prix of Alabama:
  - On Lap 1, Josef Newgarden lost control in Turn 4 at Barber Motorsports Park as he crested the hill, collecting Colton Herta, Ryan Hunter-Reay, Felix Rosenqvist, Rinus VeeKay, and Max Chilton. Rosenqvist, Hunter-Reay, and Herta were out of the race with crash damage. Jimmie Johnson, making his IndyCar debut, was in the pack at the time of the crash but was able to weave his way through unscathed, which the commentary team likened to dodging a similar crash at Talladega.

== See also ==
- 1973 Winston 500
