= 2008 AMP Energy 500 =

Race details
- Race 30 of 36 in the 2008 NASCAR Sprint Cup Series
- Talladega Superspeedway
- Date: October 5, 2008
- Official name: AMP Energy 500
- Location: Talladega Superspeedway, Talladega, Alabama
- Course: Permanent racing facility
- Course length: 2.66 miles (4.281 km)
- Distance: 190 laps, 505.4 mi (813.362 km)
- Scheduled distance: 188 laps, 500.08 mi (804.801 km)
- Weather: Temperatures reaching up to 82.9 °F (28.3 °C); wind speeds up to 6 miles per hour (9.7 km/h)
- Average speed: 140.281 miles per hour (225.760 km/h)

Pole position
Driver	Travis Kvapil	Yates Racing
- Time: 51.109

Most laps led
Driver	Tony Stewart	Joe Gibbs Racing
- Laps: 24

Winner
No. 20	Tony Stewart	Joe Gibbs Racing

Television in the United States
- Network: ABC
- Announcers: Jerry Punch, Dale Jarrett, Andy Petree
- Nielsen ratings: 4.6 (Final); 4.0 (Overnight); (7.44 million)

The 2008 AMP Energy 500 was the 30th stock car race of the 2008 NASCAR Sprint Cup Series and the fourth in the ten-race, season-ending Chase for the Sprint Cup. It was held on October 5, 2008, at Talladega Superspeedway, in Talladega, Alabama before a crowd of 145,000. Tony Stewart of the Joe Gibbs Racing team won the 190-lap race starting from 34th position; Paul Menard finished second, David Ragan was third.

Travis Kvapil, who had the pole position, led until Carl Edwards passed him on lap nine. The race was first stopped 63 laps later when a multi-car collision was triggered by Brian Vickers, and was restarted 17 minutes later, with Dale Earnhardt Jr. leading the field. A second red-flag period was triggered after Edwards ran into teammate Greg Biffle starting a chain-reaction accident involving a further ten drivers. Stewart led the field for the remainder of the race, until Regan Smith passed him below the yellow line (out of bounds line) on the final lap. Stewart was therefore handed the victory, and Smith was demoted from second to 18th. The race had a total of ten cautions, and 64 lead changes among 28 different drivers, setting a new Sprint Cup Series record.

It was Stewart's first victory of the season, his first at Talladega Superspeedway, and the 33rd of his career. The result advanced him to seventh in the Drivers' Championship, 232 behind leader Jimmie Johnson who extended his lead to 72 points over Edwards. Toyota extended its lead in the Manufacturers' Championship, twelve points ahead of Ford in second place. Chevrolet remained in third with a 41-point advantage over Dodge with six races left in the season. The race attracted 7.44 million television viewers.

== Background ==
Talladega Superspeedway, where the race was held.

The 2008 AMP Energy 500 was the 30th of 36 scheduled stock car races of the 2008 NASCAR Sprint Cup Series, and the fourth in the ten-race season-ending Chase for the Sprint Cup. It was held on October 5, 2008, at Talladega, Alabama at Talladega Superspeedway, a superspeedway that holds NASCAR races. The standard track at the speedway is a four-turn superspeedway that is 2.66 miles (4.28 km) long. The track's turns are banked at thirty-three degrees, while the front stretch, the location of the finish line, is banked at 16.5 degrees. The back stretch has a two-degree banking.

Before the race, Jimmie Johnson led the Drivers' Championship with 5,575 points, with Carl Edwards in second, and Greg Biffle in third. Jeff Burton and Kevin Harvick rounded out the top five, and Jeff Gordon, Clint Bowyer, Dale Earnhardt Jr., Matt Kenseth, Denny Hamlin, Tony Stewart and Kyle Busch rounded out the top twelve drivers competing in the 2008 Chase for the Sprint Cup. In the Manufacturers' Championship, Toyota was leading with 172 points, seven points ahead of their nearest rival Ford in second. Chevrolet was third with 159 points, with Dodge a further 39 points behind in fourth. Gordon was the race's defending champion.

Second-place championship driver Edwards said he expected the top three points leaders to remain together during the race, "I'll probably be glued to Jimmie, no matter where he's at. If him and Greg and I can just stay together, and make sure we either all avoid or either all get in the same wrecks, then we'll probably be all right." Earnhardt said he aimed to achieve his sixth victory at Talladega Superspeedway (where he had a large amount of fan support) in an effort to move ahead in the championship standings. Gordon, who had not won so far during 2008, stated he felt that he could win the race, and employed a strategy where he would attempt to avoid being caught up in a multi-car collision. Johnson felt the AMP Energy 500 would be "interesting" and "a turning point in the chase".

There were two changes of driver before the race. Red Bull Racing Team announced regular driver A. J. Allmendinger would be replaced by Mike Skinner who would drive at Talladega, and by former Scuderia Toro Rosso, Formula One driver Scott Speed who would drive in the seven remaining races of the season. Red Bull Racing vice president and general manager Jay Frye said the change would allow the Red Bull Racing Team to continue its development for the future. Kenny Wallace took over from Michael McDowell in the No. 00 Michael Waltrip Racing car at Talladega, because the team decided to regroup after he failed to qualify the previous race weekend at Kansas Speedway. Richard Childress Racing fielded a fourth car driven by Nationwide Series driver Mike Wallace.

== Practice and qualifying ==
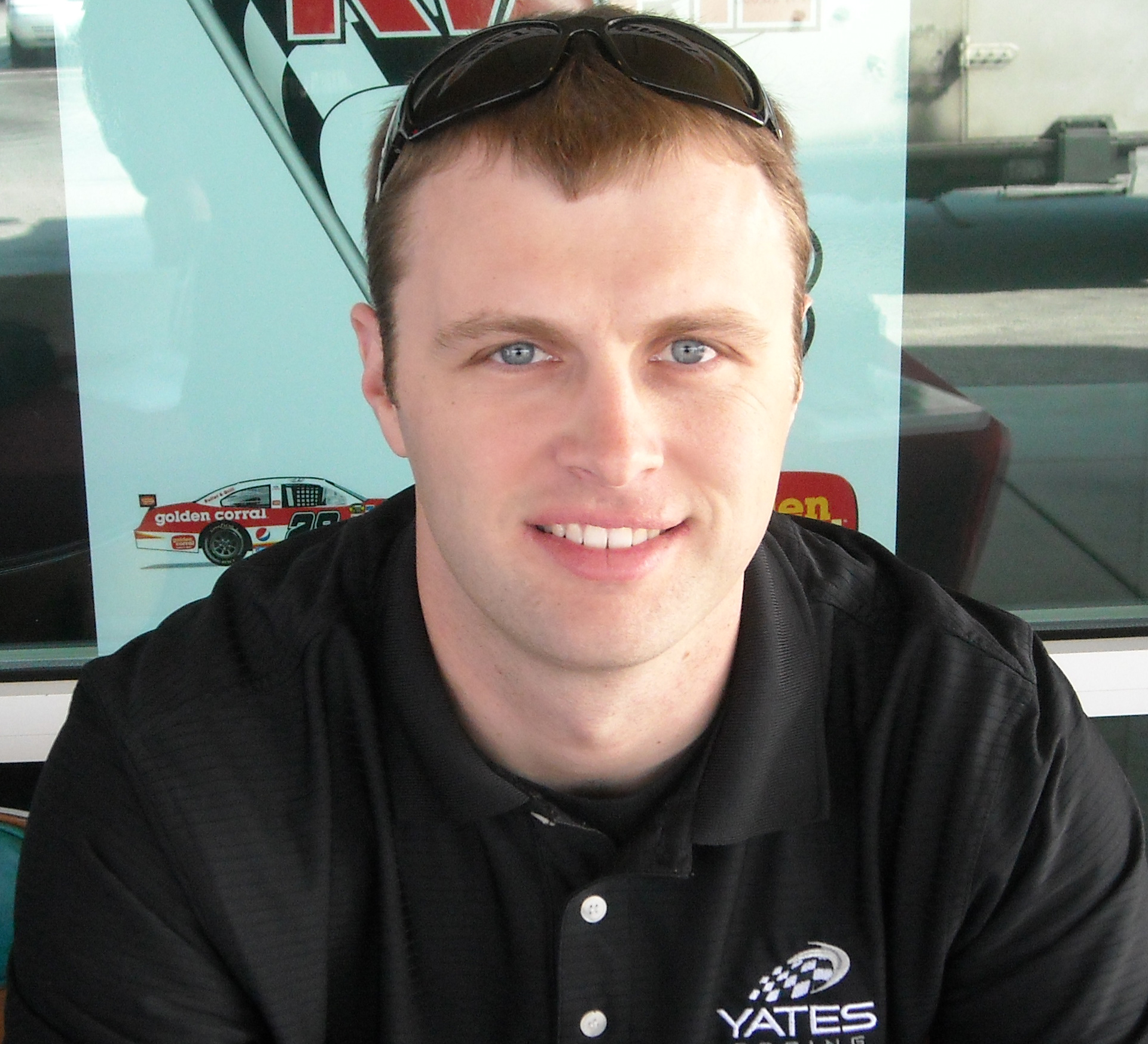
Travis Kvapil (pictured in 2009) had the first pole position of his career.

Two practice sessions were held before the Sunday race, both on Friday. The first practice session ran for 75 minutes, the second lasted 45 minutes. Burton was fastest in the first practice session with a time of 48.887 seconds; Elliott Sadler was second, and Brian Vickers third. Robby Gordon was fourth, and Harvick placed fifth. Kasey Kahne, Biffle, Jamie McMurray, Skinner and Ryan Newman rounded out the session's top ten drivers. Earnhardt's engine failed, and his team installed a new one. David Ragan did the same between the two practice sessions. Later that day, Vickers paced the final practice session (where thirty-seven drivers competed) with a time of 49.694 seconds, ahead of Kahne and Bobby Labonte. Casey Mears was fourth-fastest, ahead of Harvick, Scott Riggs and David Gilliland. Earnhardt, a Chase for the Sprint Cup driver, was eighth, with Skinner and Stewart ninth and tenth. Earnhardt's right-rear tire exploded while leading a pack of cars at the exit of turn two, nine minutes after the session started, beginning a chain-reaction accident involving cars driven by Gilliland, Stewart, David Reutimann, Hamlin, Clint Bowyer and Kahne, resulting in the session being stopped for 30 minutes. No drivers were injured, but Earnhardt and Gilliland were checked at the infield medical center and later released. Earnhardt, Bowyer, Kahne, Gilliland and Reutimann switched to back-up cars.

Forty-five cars were entered in the qualifier on Saturday afternoon, according to NASCAR's qualifying procedure, forty-three were allowed to race. Each driver ran two laps, with the starting order determined by the competitor's fastest times. Travis Kvapil took the first pole position of his career with a time of 51.109 seconds. He was joined on the grid's front row by Mears in his best qualifying performance of the season. Aric Almirola qualified third, his Dale Earnhardt, Inc. teammate Regan Smith was fourth, and Paul Menard started fifth. Mike Wallace, Joe Nemechek, Tony Raines, Vickers and Martin Truex Jr. rounded out the top ten qualifiers. Of the other drivers in the Chase, Edwards was twelfth, Burton 17th and Johnson 20th. The two drivers that failed to qualify were Sam Hornish Jr. and Patrick Carpentier. After the qualifier Kvapil said, "Definitely qualifying doesn't really mean much as far as your chances to win the race after 500 miles, but we got a good pit selection and we'll have less chance to get caught up in a wreck early on in the race. It doesn't take long to get shuffled to the back and I'm sure I'll be shuffled in and out throughout the field. But the first few laps we'll be up front and hopefully keeping it clean." He also stated the pole was "special", and it was the first time Ford had occupied that position at Talladega Superspeedway since 1997.

=== Qualifying results ===
Grid	Car	Driver	Team	Manufacturer	Time	Speed
1	28	Travis Kvapil	Yates Racing	Ford	51.109	187.364
2	5	Casey Mears	Hendrick Motorsports	Chevrolet	51.128	187.295
3	8	Aric Almirola	Dale Earnhardt, Inc.	Chevrolet	51.136	187.265
4	01	Regan Smith	Dale Earnhardt, Inc.	Chevrolet	51.159	187.181
5	15	Paul Menard	Dale Earnhardt, Inc.	Chevrolet	51.170	187.141
6	33	Mike Wallace	Richard Childress Racing	Chevrolet	51.213	186.984
7	78	Joe Nemechek	Furniture Row Racing	Chevrolet	51.217	186.969
8	70	Tony Raines	Haas CNC Racing	Chevrolet	51.280	186.740
9	83	Brian Vickers	Red Bull Racing Team	Toyota	51.289	186.707
10	1	Martin Truex Jr.	Dale Earnhardt, Inc.	Chevrolet	51.298	186.674
11	66	Scott Riggs	Haas CNC Racing	Chevrolet	51.306	186.645
12	99	Carl Edwards	Roush Fenway Racing	Ford	51.344	186.507
13	42	Juan Pablo Montoya	Chip Ganassi Racing	Dodge	51.365	186.430
14	00	Kenny Wallace	Michael Waltrip Racing	Toyota	51.365	186.430
15	88	Dale Earnhardt Jr.	Hendrick Motorsports	Chevrolet	51.367	186.423^{1}
16	6	David Ragan	Roush Fenway Racing	Ford	51.387	186.351^{1}
17	31	Jeff Burton	Richard Childress Racing	Chevrolet	51.396	186.318
18	09	Sterling Marlin	Phoenix Racing	Chevrolet	51.410	186.267
19	44	David Reutimann	Michael Waltrip Racing	Toyota	51.420	186.231
20	48	Jimmie Johnson	Hendrick Motorsports	Chevrolet	51.422	186.224^{1}
21	84	Mike Skinner	Red Bull Racing Team	Toyota	51.466	186.065
22	16	Greg Biffle	Roush Fenway Racing	Chevrolet	51.467	186.061
23	45	Terry Labonte	Petty Enterprises	Dodge	51.468	186.057
24	12	Ryan Newman	Penske Racing South	Dodge	51.499	185.945
25	55	Michael Waltrip	Michael Waltrip Racing	Toyota	51.538	185.805
26	24	Jeff Gordon	Hendrick Motorsports	Chevrolet	51.544	185.783
27	21	Jon Wood	Wood Brothers Racing	Ford	51.544	185.783
28	26	Jamie McMurray	Roush Fenway Racing	Ford	51.547	185.772
29	22	Dave Blaney	Bill Davis Racing	Toyota	51.556	185.740
30	41	Reed Sorenson	Chip Ganassi Racing	Dodge	51.561	185.722
31	17	Matt Kenseth	Roush Fenway Racing	Ford	51.570	185.689
32	43	Bobby Labonte	Petty Enterprises	Dodge	51.583	185.643
33	2	Kurt Busch	Penske Racing South	Dodge	51.613	185.535
34	20	Tony Stewart	Joe Gibbs Racing	Toyota	51.628	158.481
35	07	Clint Bowyer	Richard Childress Racing	Chevrolet	51.644	185.423
36	11	Denny Hamlin	Joe Gibbs Racing	Toyota	51.658	185.373
37	18	Kyle Busch	Joe Gibbs Racing	Toyota	51.705	185.204
38	9	Kasey Kahne	Gillett Evernham Motorsports	Dodge	51.758	185.015
39	29	Kevin Harvick	Richard Childress Racing	Chevrolet	51.760	185.008
40	19	Elliott Sadler	Gillett Evernham Motorsports	Dodge	51.775	184.954
41	38	David Gilliland	Yates Racing	Ford	51.775	184.954
42	7	Robby Gordon	Robby Gordon Motorsports	Dodge	51.938	184.374
43	96	Ken Schrader	Hall of Fame Racing	Toyota	51.557	185.736
Failed to qualify
44	77	Sam Hornish Jr.	Penske Racing South	Dodge	51.690	185.258
45	10	Patrick Carpentier	Gillett Evernham Motorsports	Dodge	51.702	185.215
^{1} Moved to the back of the field for changing engines (#6,#88) and for adjustments outside of the impound (#48).

== Race ==
Live television coverage of the race, began at 1:00 p.m. Eastern Standard Time in the United States on ABC. At the start of the race, weather conditions were sunny. Fred Cook of Alabama Raceway Ministries began pre-race ceremonies with an invocation. Brad Arnold, the lead singer of rock band 3 Doors Down performed the national anthem, and Pepsi employees Antonio Clements, John Foster, Richard Stuckey, Daniel Harris, Demetrius Blackmon, Reginald Thomas, Kenneth Goodwin, and Raymond Castleberry, who serve in the National Guard commanded the drivers to start their engines. During the pace laps, Earnhardt and Ragan moved to the rear of the field because they had changed their engines; Johnson did the same because his team adjusted his engine outside of the impound.

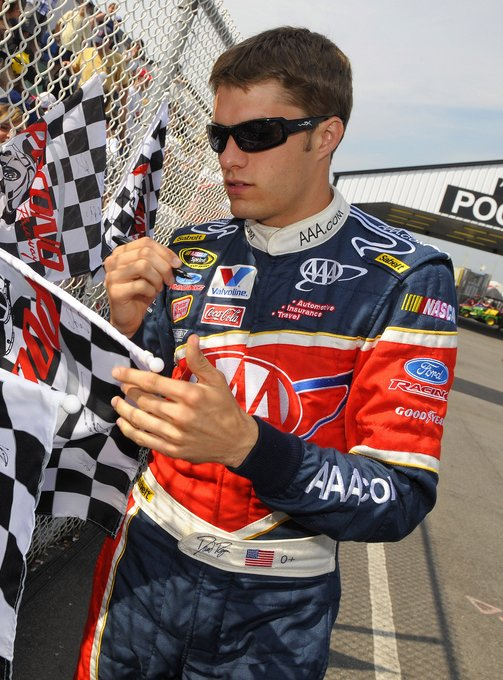
David Ragan led nine laps of the race, and finished third.

The race started at 2:23 p.m. Kvapil maintained his pole position advantage on the first lap, as the field ran three and four abreast during the lap. Mike Wallace led the cars on the outside lane and challenged Kvapil for the lead on lap four, but was unable to get ahead. Edwards and Vickers drove on the outside lane to move to the front on lap nine, and the two exchanged the lead on the backstretch, before Edwards pulled clear of Vickers. Kvapil fell to seventh place by the same lap. Vickers regained the first position on the next lap, after Edwards drove down the track. On the 14th lap, Almirola and his teammate Menard gave each other assistance, and Almirola passed Vickers on the backstretch to take over the lead. Ragan, with assistance from Kvapil, passed Almirola for first place by taking the outside lane three laps later. After falling down the field earlier in the race, Gordon had moved back up to seventh by lap 18. Earnhardt moved into the lead eight laps later, but Kvapil reclaimed the position on lap 30, after receiving assistance from Gordon. Earnhardt retook the lead two laps later, and Johnson had moved to fourth after dropping down the field earlier in the race. Mike Wallace briefly claimed the lead on lap 33 before Earnhardt regained it on the lap. The first caution was triggered on the next lap when debris was spotted on the track in turn two. Most of the leaders, including Mike Wallace, made pit stops for tires and car adjustments.

Gordon led on the lap-39 restart, followed by Truex and Burton. One lap later, Burton, with assistance from Johnson, passed Gordon for the lead. Kenseth claimed first position on lap 40 after driving on the outside lane. Vickers followed Johnson on the inside line to reclaim the lead on the following lap, before Sadler passed Vickers around the outside for the lead on the 44th lap. On lap 45, Mears led after passing Sadler, and debris was located on the backstretch, triggering a second caution. All drivers, including Mears, elected to make pit stops. Sadler reclaimed first position and led the field back up to speed at the lap-50 restart, ahead of Mears and Kyle Busch. Hamlin and Kyle Busch led the cars driving on the outside lane, with Busch claiming the lead on lap 51, pulling away from the rest of the field. Kurt Busch, with help from Vickers, got ahead of Kyle Busch to move into first place on lap 52.

Jamie McMurray took the lead by the 53rd lap, when a third caution was deployed on lap 54 after Reutimann's right-rear tire blew on the backstretch, causing Gordon to take evasive action by turning right and heavily damaged the nose of his car when he collided with the outside wall. Reutimann's tire broke Johnson's front splitter brace. All drivers, including McMurray, chose to make pit stops. Vickers elected to stay on the track and led the field at the restart on lap 59, ahead of Kvapil and Skinner. One lap later, Hamlin used the draft to take over the lead, with Labonte moving into second. Kahne used the outside lane to claim first position, before Reed Sorenson also drove on the outside lane to claim first place on the next lap. The pack drove three abreast on lap 63, as Truex moved into first place on the 64th lap. McMurray reclaimed the first position when he got ahead of Truex at the start-finish line on lap 65, and Kahne dropped to 26th position by the same lap. Truex retook the lead from McMurray at the start of the following lap, and Harvick moved into first on lap 67.

Earnhardt moved back into the lead on lap 68, when Vickers' right-front tire blew in the tri-oval on the same lap, starting a multi-car accident involving Gilliland, Truex, Kahne, Skinner, McMurray, Terry Labonte, Raines and Almirola. A fourth caution was triggered initially because of the accident before a red-flag was shown shortly afterward to stop the race to allow officials to clear the track of debris. The race resumed seventeen minutes later as the field elected to make pit stops. Earnhardt led on the lap-72 restart, followed by Menard, Burton, Harvick and Montoya. By lap 74, Montoya had the lead before Hamlin passed him at the start-finish line to lead the lap. Johnson moved to the front of the field two laps later, before losing the lead to teammate Earnhardt on lap 78 as the pack ran three abreast at the start-finish line.

Johnson moved back into the lead on lap 78, after receiving assistance from Earnhardt, before losing it to Stewart around the inside two laps later after Stewart was helped by Mike Wallace. On the 81st lap, Mike Wallace's right-rear tire blew causing a fifth caution to be displayed; Wallace regained control of his car but his tire struck Michael Waltrip's car forcing him to pit for repairs. Most of the field, including Stewart, elected to make pit stops for tires and fuel. Kyle Busch gained the lead after the pit stops, and led the field back up to speed at the lap-87 restart, followed by Earnhardt. On lap 89, Labonte led the outside lane after he was helped by Earnhardt. Hamlin, Earnhardt and Kenseth traded the first position over the next seven laps. Hamlin's right-front tire exploded in turn two on lap 99 and struck the turn two outside wall, triggering a sixth caution. The leaders, including Kyle Busch, who took the lead before the caution, made pit stops for tires and fuel.

Hamlin was extracted from his car, and placed on a stretcher and transported to a local hospital for further evaluation. Riggs led the field back up to speed at the restart on lap 105, ahead of Menard. On the same lap, Riggs lost the draft allowing Menard to move into the lead. The field went three abreast, as Menard lost the lead to Stewart on the 107th lap, but Menard reclaimed the position one lap later. Stewart retook the lead on lap 112 after he received assistance from Montoya. Burton challenged Stewart for the lead on lap 115 as both drivers ran side by side at the start-finish line, before Burton moved in front of Stewart two laps later. Harvick moved back into the lead on lap 120, after running on the inside lane. Harvick, Ragan and Stewart formed a single line, as the rest of the field ran in double-file.

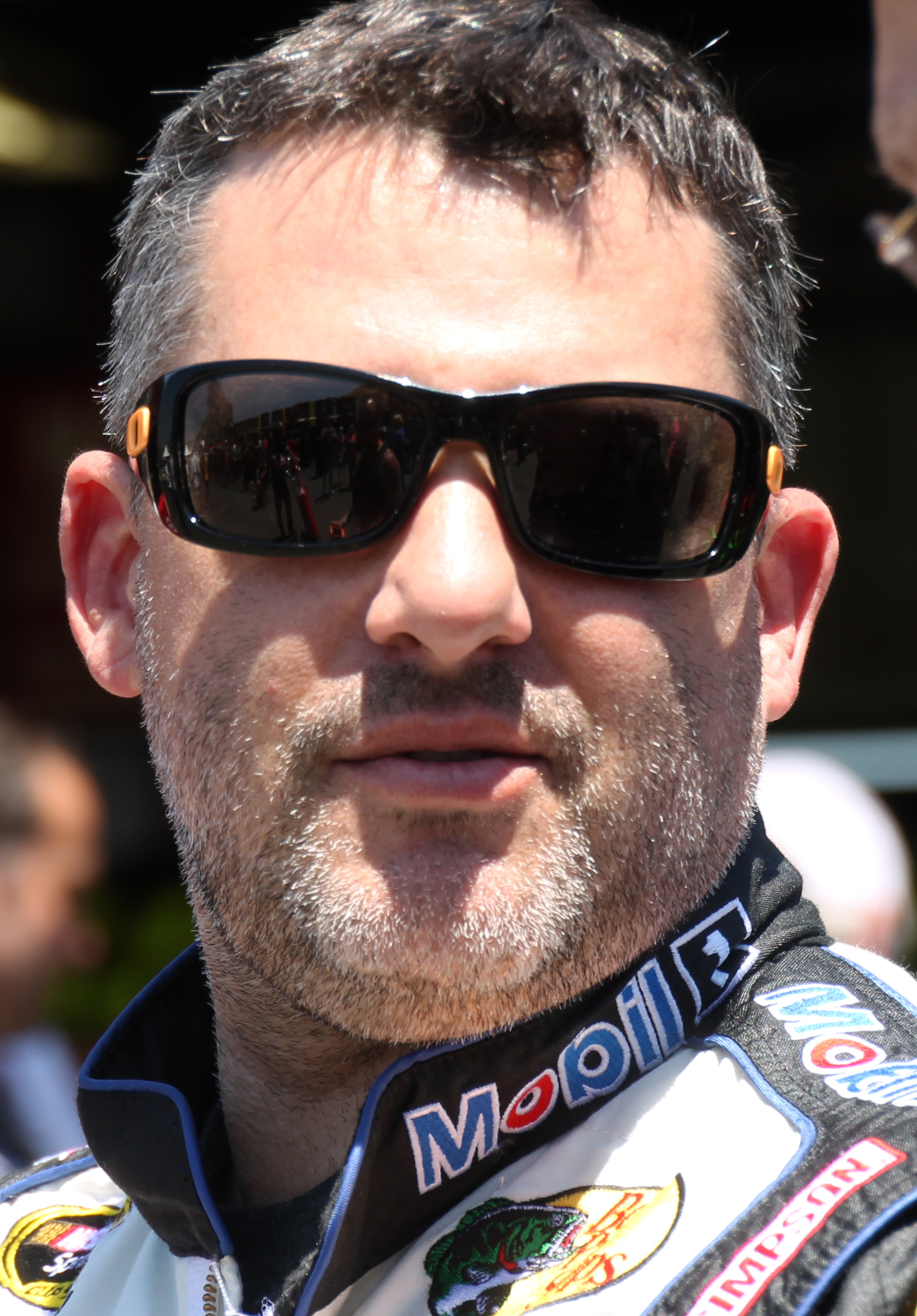
Tony Stewart (pictured in 2015) won his first race of the season.

A seventh caution was triggered on lap 138 when Gordon had smoke and fluid coming out of his car, ending his race. Most of the field, including Harvick, elected to pit under caution. Edwards spun after he left pit road but avoided damage to his car. During the pit stop period, the record for the most leaders in a Sprint Cup Series race was broken when Nemechek led one lap (the 27th race leader) before pitting. (Note: The previous record was 26 leaders jointly held by the 1986 Talladega 500 and the 2001 Talladega 500. It was further surpassed with 29 leaders at the 2010 Aaron's 499.) Kyle Busch led on the lap-145 restart, followed by Ragan, Kvapil, Stewart and Johnson. Four laps later, Johnson dropped from fifth to the rear of the field, as part of a strategy to run at the rear until the race ended. Kyle Busch lost the draft on lap 151, allowing Earnhardt to retake first place. Burton, with assistance from Richard Childress Racing teammates Bowyer, Harvick and Mike Wallace, moved back into the lead on lap 156. Ragan took over the lead on lap 160, after he was helped by Earnhardt.

Waltrip took the lead on lap 163, and an eighth caution was necessitated on lap 165 when Biffle made contact with Ragan, who hit Harvick, who spun heading into turn three but avoided hitting the barriers or other cars. Some drivers, including Waltrip, chose to pit for fresh tires and fuel during the caution. Montoya elected not to pit, and led the field at the restart on lap 170. The top six drivers quickly began to pull away from the rest of the field, as Stewart ran fourth and Harvick 16th by lap 172. Stewart and Montoya ran alongside each other at the line on lap 173, before Stewart moved in front for the lead one lap later. On the same lap, a second multi-car accident occurred necessitating a ninth caution when Edwards made contact with teammate Biffle going into turn three, and collected, Earnhardt, Harvick, Kyle Busch, Nemechek, Sorenson, Kenseth, Kvapil, Watrip, Dave Blaney and Montoya. The second red-flag of the race was shown shortly afterward to allow officials to clear debris from the track. The race was restarted twelve minutes later, as some drivers made pit stops.

Stewart led the field back up to speed at the lap-179 restart, ahead of Nemechek and Sadler. Stewart and Nemechek pulled away from the rest of the field, but Nemechek lost the draft on the next lap and fell behind Sadler. The field formed into a single file, and remained this way until a tenth and final caution of the race was deployed because McMurray's right-rear tire failed on lap 185. The race restarted on lap 189, for a green–white–checkered finish (extending the race to 190 laps) with Stewart leading Smith. The field again formed a single line, with most drivers remaining in that formation for the rest of the race. On the final lap, Smith passed Stewart on the frontstretch below the yellow line, and crossed the start-finish line ahead of Stewart. NASCAR determined that Smith was out of track bounds, handing Stewart the victory with Smith provisionally in second. The race had a total of ten cautions and 64 lead changes by 28 drivers. Stewart led four different times for a total of 24 laps, more than any other competitor.

=== Post-race comments ===
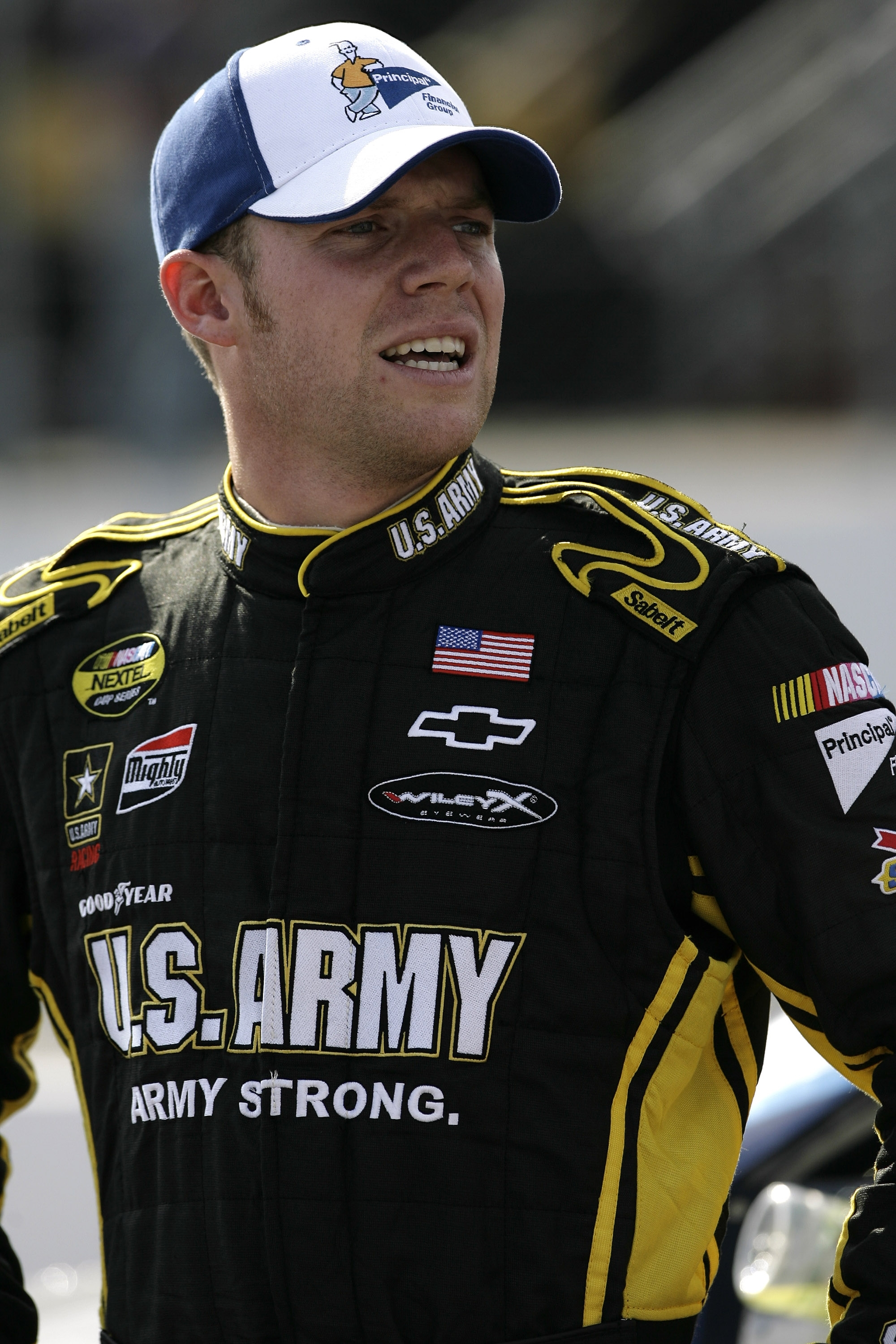
Regan Smith (pictured in 2007) who was demoted from second to eighteenth for passing Stewart below the yellow line.

Stewart, who earned $270,136 for the victory, appeared in victory lane to celebrate his first win of the season, and his first at Talladega Superspeedway, in front of a crowd of 145,000. He was delighted to take the victory: "It's one thing to get back to Victory Lane, but to do it at Talladega wow." Stewart continued, "I've wanted to win here for so long. This hasn't been one of my favorite places on the fan side. People haven't always liked me here. But this was for those guys up in the stands today." Second-place finisher Menard was pleased with his result, saying he had a good car throughout the duration of the race: "Car had speed in it all day. Didn't make any chassis adjustments, just did a little bit of air pressure after the first run to free it up. It was just all track position really." In the post-race press conference, third-place finisher Ragan said that he felt that he had a car which could have secured the victory under the right circumstances, but believed it was a good day for his team: "We always seem to be pretty fast here on the superspeedway track, so that just goes to show you how much effort our Roush Fenway team is putting into this program."

NASCAR officials reviewed video evidence of Smith's pass of Stewart on the final lap with Smith and Dale Earnhardt, Inc. president Max Siegel in attendance, and declared the manoeuvre illegal; Smith was issued a pass-through penalty which dropped him from second to 18th. Smith argued that he was forced down below the yellow line: "I was always told that the rule is if you get forced down there, then you are the winner of the race, and on the last lap, anything goes. That’s what I was going with. I had a nose inside of him and I could have piled up the whole field." Ninth-place finisher Johnson said there were rumors that drivers were allowed to go below the yellow line on the last lap of the previous day's Craftsman Truck Series race which were circulated on the day of the AMP Energy 500: "I didn’t know what to really think about it, or understood it, or had seen it. It’s ironic how it played out today.”

NASCAR spokesperson Jim Hunter however insisted Smith was not forced below the yellow line, and stated drivers were warned beforehand in the pre-race drivers' meeting about gaining a position illegally. Earnhardt said he felt Smith deserved to win, saying there was a lack of clarity over what going below the yellow line meant. Smith stated he did not ask for clarification of the rule because of his low-profile status. NASCAR president Mike Helton stated that race officials had correctly awarded the penalty to Smith, and clarified that no driver would be allowed to advance their position by going below the yellow line at any time during a race. Similarities were made between Smith's overtake, and Earnhardt's pass of Kenseth below the yellow line at Talladega at the 2003 Aaron's 499.

Hamlin was kept in hospital overnight for further evaluation, but complained of a headache and favored his right foot after exiting his car. His crew chief Mike Ford revealed Hamlin's right-rear tire had been cut on the run before his crash which Hamlin later attributed to running over debris on track. Vickers described his right-front tire failure saying: "It sounded like a bomb exploded." Goodyear's product manager Rick Heinrich said the tires used in the race were the same from the Aaron's 499, and conducted an analysis of the tire failures at their plant in Akron, Ohio. Edwards admitted he was at fault for causing the crash between himself and teammate Biffle on lap 174, and apologized to the drivers caught up in the incident. Biffle revealed he was unable to steer his Ford away from the incident.

The result kept Johnson in the lead of the Drivers' Championship, seventy-two points ahead of Edwards. Biffle and Burton maintained third and fourth positions, while Bowyer moved up to fifth. Harvick moved up into sixth, with Stewart's victory advancing him from eleventh to seventh place. Gordon, Kenseth, Earnhardt, Kyle Busch and Hamlin rounded out the top twelve. In the Manufacturers' Championship, Toyota extended their lead over Ford to twelve points. Chevrolet remained in third with 165, 41 points ahead of Dodge. The race attracted a television audience of 7.44 million people. It took three hours, thirty-six minutes and ten seconds to complete the event, and the margin of victory was 0.052 seconds.

=== Race results ===
Pos	Grid	Car	Driver	Team	Manufacturer	Laps run	Points
1	34	20	Tony Stewart	Joe Gibbs Racing	Toyota	190	195^{2}
2	5	15	Paul Menard	Dale Earnhardt, Inc.	Chevrolet	190	175^{1}
3	16	6	David Ragan	Roush Fenway Racing	Ford	190	170^{1}
4	17	31	Jeff Burton	Richard Childress Racing	Chevrolet	190	165^{1}
5	35	07	Clint Bowyer	Richard Childress Racing	Chevrolet	190	155
6	32	43	Bobby Labonte	Petty Enterprises	Dodge	190	150
7	11	66	Scott Riggs	Haas CNC Racing	Dodge	190	151^{1}
8	42	7	Robby Gordon	Robby Gordon Motorsports	Dodge	190	142
9	20	48	Jimmie Johnson	Hendrick Motorsports	Chevrolet	190	143^{1}
10	40	19	Elliott Sadler	Gillett Evernham Motorsports	Dodge	190	139^{1}
11	7	78	Joe Nemechek	Furniture Row Racing	Chevrolet	190	135^{1}
12	14	00	Kenny Wallace	Michael Waltrip Racing	Toyota	190	132^{1}
13	3	8	Aric Almirola	Dale Earnhardt, Inc.	Chevrolet	190	129^{1}
14	2	5	Casey Mears	Hendrick Motorsports	Chevrolet	190	126^{1}
15	37	18	Kyle Busch	Joe Gibbs Racing	Toyota	190	123^{1}
16	43	96	Ken Schrader	Hall of Fame Racing	Toyota	190	115
17	23	45	Terry Labonte	Petty Enterprises	Dodge	190	112
18	4	01	Regan Smith	Dale Earnhardt, Inc.	Chevrolet	190	109^{3}
19	25	55	Michael Waltrip	Michael Waltrip Racing	Toyota	187	111^{1}
20	39	29	Kevin Harvick	Richard Childress Racing	Chevrolet	179	108^{1}
21	33	2	Kurt Busch	Penske Racing South	Dodge	177	105^{1}
22	29	22	Dave Blaney	Bill Davis Racing	Toyota	176	97
23	30	41	Reed Sorenson	Chip Ganassi Racing	Dodge	175	99^{1}
24	22	16	Greg Biffle	Roush Fenway Racing	Ford	174	96^{1}
25	13	42	Juan Pablo Montoya	Chip Ganassi Racing	Dodge	173	93^{1}
26	31	17	Matt Kenseth	Roush Fenway Racing	Ford	173	90^{1}
27	1	28	Travis Kvapil	Yates Racing	Ford	173	87^{1}
28	15	88	Dale Earnhardt Jr.	Hendrick Motorsports	Chevrolet	173	84^{1}
29	12	99	Carl Edwards	Roush Fenway Racing	Ford	173	81^{1}
30	6	33	Mike Wallace	Richard Childress Racing	Chevrolet	169	73
31	21	84	Mike Skinner	Red Bull Racing Team	Toyota	160	70
32	28	26	Jamie McMurray	Roush Fenway Racing	Ford	159	72^{1}
33	27	21	Jon Wood	Wood Brothers Racing	Ford	154	64
34	8	70	Tony Raines	Haas CNC Racing	Chevrolet	148	61
35	9	83	Brian Vickers	Red Bull Racing Team	Toyota	134	63^{1}
36	38	9	Kasey Kahne	Gillett Evernham Motorsports	Dodge	112	60^{1}
37	19	44	David Reutimann	Michael Waltrip Racing	Toyota	110	52
38	26	24	Jeff Gordon	Hendrick Motorsports	Chevrolet	104	54^{1}
39	36	11	Denny Hamlin	Joe Gibbs Racing	Toyota	98	51^{1}
40	41	38	David Gilliland	Yates Racing	Ford	68	43
41	10	1	Martin Truex Jr.	Dale Earnhardt, Inc.	Chevrolet	68	45^{1}
42	18	09	Sterling Marlin	Phoenix Racing	Chevrolet	68	37
43	24	12	Ryan Newman	Penske Racing South	Dodge	48	34
^{1} Includes five bonus points for leading a lap
^{2} Includes ten bonus points for leading the most laps
^{3} Demoted from second to eighteenth for passing below the yellow line

== Standings after the race ==
Drivers' Championship standings

Pos	+/–	Driver	Points
1		Jimmie Johnson	5,718
2		Carl Edwards	5,646 (−72)
3		Greg Biffle	5,641 (−77)
4		Jeff Burton	5,619 (−99)
5	2	Clint Bowyer	5,566 (−152)
6	1	Kevin Harvick	5,547 (−171)
7	4	Tony Stewart	5,515 (−203)
8	2	Jeff Gordon	5,486 (−232)
9		Matt Kenseth	5,473 (−245)
10	2	Dale Earnhardt Jr.	5,469 (−249)
11	1	Kyle Busch	5,387 (−331)
12	2	Denny Hamlin	5,383 (−335)

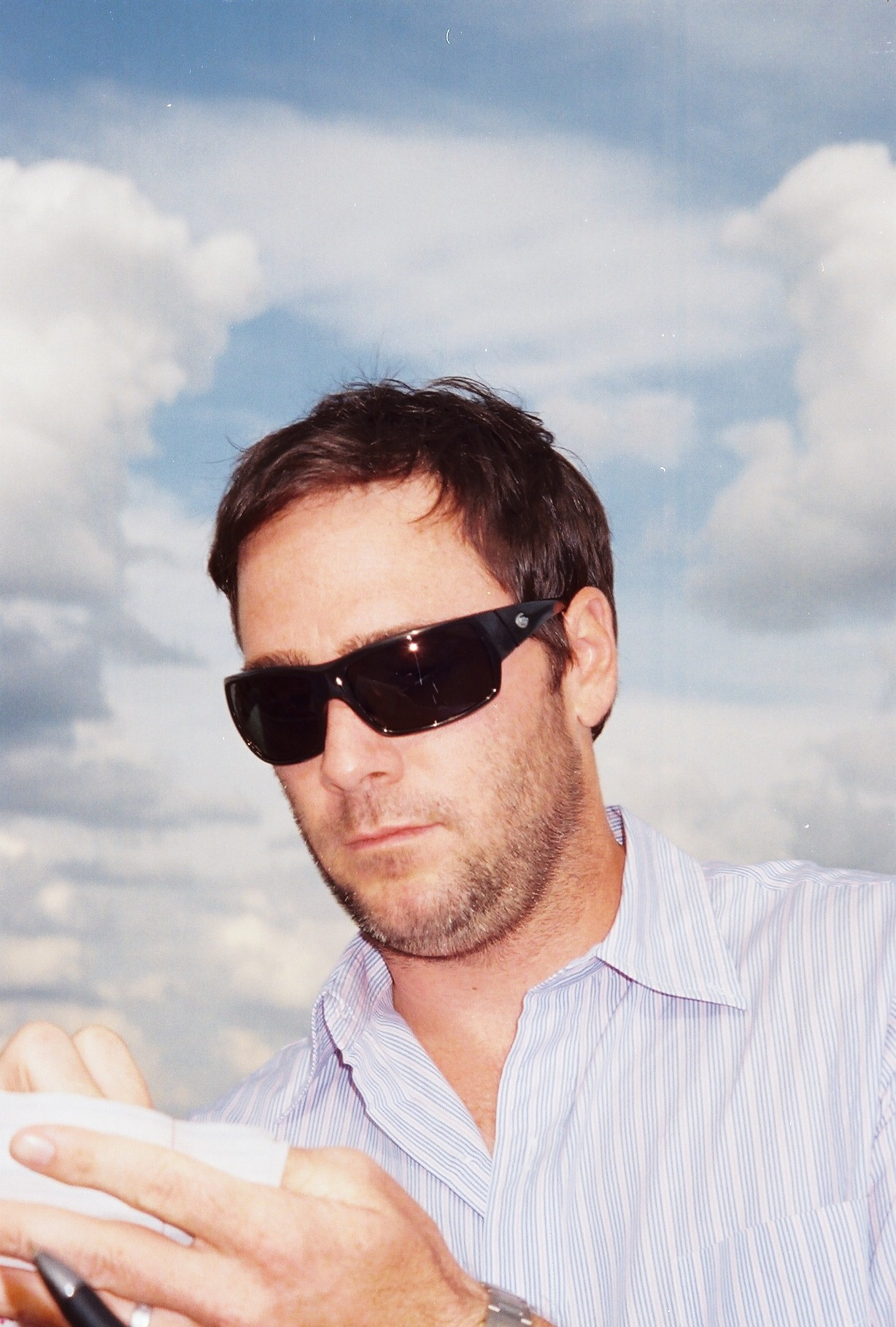
Jimmie Johnson remained the points leader after the race.

Manufacturers' Championship standings

Pos	+/–	Manufacturer	Points
1		Toyota	181
2		Ford	169 (−12)
3		Chevrolet	165 (−16)
4		Dodge	124 (−57)

- Note: Only the top twelve positions are included for the driver standings. These drivers qualified for the Chase for the Sprint Cup.

== Notes and references ==
=== References ===
Previous race: 2008 Camping World RV 400 presented by Coleman	Sprint Cup Series; 2008 season	Next race: 2008 Bank of America 500
