= 2024 YellaWood 500 =

NASCAR Cup Series race

Race details
- Race 31 of 36 in the 2024 NASCAR Cup Series
- Date: October 6, 2024
- Location: Talladega Superspeedway in Lincoln, Alabama
- Course: Permanent racing facility
- Course length: 2.66 miles (4.28 km)
- Distance: 195 laps, 518.7 mi (834.766 km)
- Scheduled distance: 188 laps, 500.08 mi (804.8 km)
- Weather: Sunny with a temperature around 84 °F (29 °C); wind out of the southwest at around 2 miles per hour (3.2 km/h).
- Average speed: 150.773 miles per hour (242.646 km/h)

Pole position
Driver	Michael McDowell	Front Row Motorsports
- Time: 52.310

Most laps led
Driver	Austin Cindric	Team Penske
- Laps: 29

Winner
No. 47	Ricky Stenhouse Jr.	JTG Daugherty Racing

Television in the United States
- Network: NBC
- Announcers: Leigh Diffey, Jeff Burton and Steve Letarte (booth); Jimmie Johnson and Dale Jarrett (NBC Peacock Pitbox)
- Nielsen ratings: 1.74 (3.127 million)

Radio in the United States
- Radio: MRN
- Booth announcers: Alex Hayden, Jeff Striegle and Todd Gordon
- Turn announcers: Dave Moody (1 & 2), Mike Bagley (Backstretch) and Chris Wilner (3 & 4)

The 2024 YellaWood 500 was a NASCAR Cup Series race held on October 6, 2024, at Talladega Superspeedway in Lincoln, Alabama. Contested over 195 laps—extended from 188 laps due to an overtime finish on the 2.66 mi (4.28 km) asphalt superspeedway, it was the 31st race of the 2024 NASCAR Cup Series season, the fifth race of the playoffs, and the second race of the Round of 12. Ricky Stenhouse Jr. won the race, his first since the 2023 Daytona 500. Brad Keselowski finished 2nd, and William Byron finished 3rd. Kyle Larson and Erik Jones rounded out the top five, and Christopher Bell, Justin Haley, Austin Dillon, Bubba Wallace, and Denny Hamlin rounded out the top ten.

The race is notable for containing the largest "Big One" in modern Cup Series history, with 28 cars being officially recorded as being involved.

== Report ==
=== Background ===
Talladega Superspeedway, the track where the race was held.

Talladega Superspeedway, formerly known as Alabama International Motor Speedway, is a motorsports complex located north of Talladega, Alabama. It is located on the former Anniston Air Force Base in the small city of Lincoln. A tri-oval, the track was constructed in 1969 by the International Speedway Corporation, a business controlled by the France family. Talladega is most known for its steep banking. The track currently hosts NASCAR's Cup Series, Xfinity Series, and Craftsman Truck Series. Talladega is the longest NASCAR oval with a length of 2.66-mile-long (4.28 km) tri-oval like the Daytona International Speedway, which is 2.5-mile-long (4.0 km).

==== Entry list ====
- (R) denotes rookie driver.
- (P) denotes playoff driver.
- (i) denotes driver who is ineligible for series driver points.

No.	Driver	Team	Manufacturer
1	Ross Chastain	Trackhouse Racing	Chevrolet
2	Austin Cindric (P)	Team Penske	Ford
3	Austin Dillon	Richard Childress Racing	Chevrolet
4	Josh Berry (R)	Stewart-Haas Racing	Ford
5	Kyle Larson (P)	Hendrick Motorsports	Chevrolet
6	Brad Keselowski	RFK Racing	Ford
7	Justin Haley	Spire Motorsports	Chevrolet
8	Kyle Busch	Richard Childress Racing	Chevrolet
9	Chase Elliott (P)	Hendrick Motorsports	Chevrolet
10	Noah Gragson	Stewart-Haas Racing	Ford
11	Denny Hamlin (P)	Joe Gibbs Racing	Toyota
12	Ryan Blaney (P)	Team Penske	Ford
13	A. J. Allmendinger (i)	Kaulig Racing	Chevrolet
14	Chase Briscoe (P)	Stewart-Haas Racing	Ford
15	Cody Ware	Rick Ware Racing	Ford
16	Shane van Gisbergen (i)	Kaulig Racing	Chevrolet
17	Chris Buescher	RFK Racing	Ford
19	Martin Truex Jr.	Joe Gibbs Racing	Toyota
20	Christopher Bell (P)	Joe Gibbs Racing	Toyota
21	Harrison Burton	Wood Brothers Racing	Ford
22	Joey Logano (P)	Team Penske	Ford
23	Bubba Wallace	23XI Racing	Toyota
24	William Byron (P)	Hendrick Motorsports	Chevrolet
31	Daniel Hemric	Kaulig Racing	Chevrolet
34	Michael McDowell	Front Row Motorsports	Ford
38	Todd Gilliland	Front Row Motorsports	Ford
41	Ryan Preece	Stewart-Haas Racing	Ford
42	John Hunter Nemechek	Legacy Motor Club	Toyota
43	Erik Jones	Legacy Motor Club	Toyota
44	J. J. Yeley (i)	NY Racing Team	Chevrolet
45	Tyler Reddick (P)	23XI Racing	Toyota
47	Ricky Stenhouse Jr.	JTG Daugherty Racing	Chevrolet
48	Alex Bowman (P)	Hendrick Motorsports	Chevrolet
51	Corey LaJoie	Rick Ware Racing	Ford
54	Ty Gibbs	Joe Gibbs Racing	Toyota
62	Anthony Alfredo (i)	Beard Motorsports	Chevrolet
71	Zane Smith (R)	Spire Motorsports	Chevrolet
77	Carson Hocevar (R)	Spire Motorsports	Chevrolet
78	B. J. McLeod (i)	Live Fast Motorsports	Chevrolet
99	Daniel Suárez (P)	Trackhouse Racing	Chevrolet
Official entry list

== Qualifying ==
Michael McDowell scored the pole for the race with a time of 52.310 and a speed of 183.063 mph (294.611 km/h).

=== Qualifying results ===
Pos	No.	Driver	Team	Manufacturer	R1	R2
1	34	Michael McDowell	Front Row Motorsports	Ford	52.344	52.310
2	2	Austin Cindric (P)	Team Penske	Ford	52.545	52.493
3	38	Todd Gilliland	Front Row Motorsports	Ford	52.630	52.541
4	8	Kyle Busch	Richard Childress Racing	Chevrolet	52.707	52.655
5	12	Ryan Blaney (P)	Team Penske	Ford	52.613	52.678
6	22	Joey Logano (P)	Team Penske	Ford	52.647	52.706
7	3	Austin Dillon	Richard Childress Racing	Chevrolet	52.764	52.741
8	11	Denny Hamlin (P)	Joe Gibbs Racing	Toyota	52.766	52.744
9	21	Harrison Burton	Wood Brothers Racing	Ford	52.711	52.895
10	31	Daniel Hemric	Kaulig Racing	Chevrolet	52.769	52.912
11	9	Chase Elliott (P)	Hendrick Motorsports	Chevrolet	52.812	—
12	5	Kyle Larson (P)	Hendrick Motorsports	Chevrolet	52.821	—
13	6	Brad Keselowski	RFK Racing	Ford	52.832	—
14	45	Tyler Reddick (P)	23XI Racing	Toyota	52.841	—
15	54	Ty Gibbs	Joe Gibbs Racing	Toyota	52.849	—
16	24	William Byron (P)	Hendrick Motorsports	Chevrolet	52.904	—
17	16	Shane van Gisbergen (i)	Kaulig Racing	Chevrolet	52.914	—
18	41	Ryan Preece	Stewart-Haas Racing	Ford	52.916	—
19	4	Josh Berry (R)	Stewart-Haas Racing	Ford	52.932	—
20	17	Chris Buescher	RFK Racing	Ford	52.994	—
21	20	Christopher Bell (P)	Joe Gibbs Racing	Toyota	53.007	—
22	10	Noah Gragson	Stewart-Haas Racing	Ford	53.011	—
23	48	Alex Bowman (P)	Hendrick Motorsports	Chevrolet	53.012	—
24	19	Martin Truex Jr.	Joe Gibbs Racing	Toyota	53.020	—
25	13	A. J. Allmendinger (i)	Kaulig Racing	Chevrolet	53.044	—
26	23	Bubba Wallace	23XI Racing	Toyota	53.064	—
27	1	Ross Chastain	Trackhouse Racing	Chevrolet	53.077	—
28	51	Corey LaJoie	Rick Ware Racing	Ford	53.220	—
29	42	John Hunter Nemechek	Legacy Motor Club	Toyota	53.223	—
30	43	Erik Jones	Legacy Motor Club	Toyota	53.259	—
31	99	Daniel Suárez (P)	Trackhouse Racing	Chevrolet	53.253	—
32	47	Ricky Stenhouse Jr.	JTG Daugherty Racing	Chevrolet	53.291	—
33	62	Anthony Alfredo (i)	Beard Motorsports	Chevrolet	53.316	—
34	15	Cody Ware	Rick Ware Racing	Ford	53.324	—
35	7	Justin Haley	Spire Motorsports	Chevrolet	53.494	—
36	14	Chase Briscoe (P)	Stewart-Haas Racing	Ford	53.498	—
37	77	Carson Hocevar (R)	Spire Motorsports	Chevrolet	53.699	—
38	78	B. J. McLeod (i)	Live Fast Motorsports	Chevrolet	53.870	—
39	71	Zane Smith (R)	Spire Motorsports	Chevrolet	53.921	—
40	44	J. J. Yeley (i)	NY Racing Team	Chevrolet	54.768	—
Official qualifying results

== Race ==
=== The Big One ===
With just 5 laps remaining in the race, the big one occurred down the backstretch. Austin Cindric was leading when Ricky Stenhouse Jr. got side by side with Cindric. Behind Cindric was Brad Keselowski. Keselowski had a run behind Cindric and bumped into Cindric's rear. Keselowski hit him hard enough that caused Cindric to lose control of his car and turn up the track into Stenhouse which sent Cindric spinning in front of the pack. Cars checked up but ran into one another causing a chain reaction crash.

A total of 28 cars were involved in the crash, the largest in modern Cup Series history surpassing the 2003 Aaron's 499 big one at the same track that took out 27 cars. It was also the second-largest in modern NASCAR history behind the 2002 Aaron's 312 in the Busch Series (now called the O’Reilly Auto Parts Series) at the same track that took out 31 cars. There were cars with no damage while there were others that had severe damage such as crushed front bumpers and broken wheels while parts of the cars who were involved were stuck with flat tires that caused their tires to spin and not move the car. This prompted a red flag that lasted for nearly 9 minutes and a 9 lap caution period. Only 7 drivers ended up DNFing from the wreck.

==== Cars involved in the crash ====
1. 2- Austin Cindric (P)
2. 4- Josh Berry
3. 8- Kyle Busch
4. 9- Chase Elliott (P)
5. 10- Noah Gragson
6. 13- A. J. Allmendinger
7. 14- Chase Briscoe (P)
8. 16- Shane van Gisbergen
9. 17- Chris Buescher
10. 19- Martin Truex Jr.
11. 20- Christopher Bell (P)
12. 21- Harrison Burton
13. 22- Joey Logano (P)
14. 23- Bubba Wallace
15. 31- Daniel Hemric
16. 34- Michael McDowell
17. 38- Todd Gilliland
18. 41- Ryan Preece
19. 42- John Hunter Nemechek
20. 43- Erik Jones
21. 45- Tyler Reddick (P)
22. 47- Ricky Stenhouse Jr. (eventual winner)
23. 48- Alex Bowman (P)
24. 51- Corey LaJoie
25. 62- Anthony Alfredo
26. 71- Zane Smith
27. 77- Carson Hocevar
28. 99- Daniel Suárez (P)

=== Final lap ===
The wreck set up NASCAR overtime for a two lap shootout. On the restart, Ricky Stenhouse Jr. took the lead but Brad Keselowski got side by side with Stenhouse. On the last lap, they both continued to be side by side with Stenhouse getting pushed by William Byron and Keselowski getting pushed by Kyle Larson. In turn 3, Keselowski got in front and looked like he was gonna be able to hold everyone off and win. But out of turn 4, Stenhouse got a big push from Byron and got side by side with Keselowski again. The two remained side by side through the tri-oval and Byron peaked to the outside in an attempt to make it a 3 wide finish but didn't get close enough and both Stenhouse and Keselowski crossed the finish line side by side. Stenhouse won the race by 0.006 seconds. This was Stenhouse's first win since the 2023 Daytona 500. It was the 4th photo finish in the top 3 Series of the year with the previous 3 being the 3 wide photo finish at Atlanta in Cup where Daniel Suárez beat Ryan Blaney by 0.003 seconds and Kyle Busch by 0.007 seconds, the 2nd closest Xfinity Series finish at Texas that saw Sam Mayer beat Ryan Sieg by 0.002 seconds, and the closest Cup Series finish at Kansas that saw Kyle Larson beat Chris Buescher by 0.001 seconds.

=== Race results ===
==== Stage results ====
Stage One Laps: 60

Pos	No	Driver	Team	Manufacturer	Points
1	17	Chris Buescher	RFK Racing	Ford	10
2	47	Ricky Stenhouse Jr.	JTG Daugherty Racing	Chevrolet	9
3	24	William Byron (P)	Hendrick Motorsports	Chevrolet	8
4	5	Kyle Larson (P)	Hendrick Motorsports	Chevrolet	7
5	20	Christopher Bell (P)	Joe Gibbs Racing	Toyota	6
6	45	Tyler Reddick (P)	23XI Racing	Toyota	5
7	1	Ross Chastain	Trackhouse Racing	Chevrolet	4
8	14	Chase Briscoe (P)	Stewart-Haas Racing	Ford	3
9	2	Austin Cindric (P)	Team Penske	Ford	2
10	12	Ryan Blaney (P)	Team Penske	Ford	1
Official stage one results

Stage Two Laps: 60

Pos	No	Driver	Team	Manufacturer	Points
1	2	Austin Cindric (P)	Team Penske	Ford	10
2	9	Chase Elliott (P)	Hendrick Motorsports	Chevrolet	9
3	8	Kyle Busch	Richard Childress Racing	Chevrolet	8
4	16	Shane van Gisbergen (i)	Kaulig Racing	Chevrolet	0
5	24	William Byron (P)	Hendrick Motorsports	Chevrolet	6
6	48	Alex Bowman (P)	Hendrick Motorsports	Chevrolet	5
7	23	Bubba Wallace	23XI Racing	Toyota	4
8	12	Ryan Blaney (P)	Team Penske	Ford	3
9	5	Kyle Larson (P)	Hendrick Motorsports	Chevrolet	2
10	1	Ross Chastain	Trackhouse Racing	Chevrolet	1
Official stage two results

=== Final Stage results ===
Stage Three Laps: 68

Pos	Grid	No	Driver	Team	Manufacturer	Laps	Points
1	32	47	Ricky Stenhouse Jr.	JTG Daugherty Racing	Chevrolet	195	49
2	13	6	Brad Keselowski	RFK Racing	Ford	195	35
3	16	24	William Byron (P)	Hendrick Motorsports	Chevrolet	195	48
4	12	5	Kyle Larson (P)	Hendrick Motorsports	Chevrolet	195	42
5	30	43	Erik Jones	Legacy Motor Club	Toyota	195	32
6	21	20	Christopher Bell (P)	Joe Gibbs Racing	Toyota	195	37
7	35	7	Justin Haley	Spire Motorsports	Chevrolet	195	30
8	7	3	Austin Dillon	Richard Childress Racing	Chevrolet	195	29
9	26	23	Bubba Wallace	23XI Racing	Toyota	195	32
10	8	11	Denny Hamlin (P)	Joe Gibbs Racing	Toyota	195	27
11	24	19	Martin Truex Jr.	Joe Gibbs Racing	Toyota	195	26
12	34	15	Cody Ware	Rick Ware Racing	Ford	195	25
13	15	54	Ty Gibbs	Joe Gibbs Racing	Toyota	195	24
14	37	77	Carson Hocevar (R)	Spire Motorsports	Chevrolet	195	23
15	17	16	Shane van Gisbergen (i)	Kaulig Racing	Chevrolet	195	0
16	23	48	Alex Bowman (P)	Hendrick Motorsports	Chevrolet	195	26
17	20	17	Chris Buescher	RFK Racing	Ford	195	30
18	28	51	Corey LaJoie	Rick Ware Racing	Ford	195	19
19	4	8	Kyle Busch	Richard Childress Racing	Chevrolet	195	26
20	14	45	Tyler Reddick (P)	23XI Racing	Toyota	195	22
21	39	71	Zane Smith (R)	Spire Motorsports	Chevrolet	195	16
22	38	78	B. J. McLeod (i)	Live Fast Motorsprots	Chevrolet	195	0
23	3	38	Todd Gilliland	Front Row Motorsports	Ford	194	14
24	33	62	Anthony Alfredo (i)	Beard Motorsports	Chevrolet	194	0
25	22	10	Noah Gragson	Stewart-Haas Racing	Ford	194	12
26	31	99	Daniel Suárez (P)	Trackhouse Racing	Chevrolet	194	11
27	40	44	J. J. Yeley (i)	NY Racing Team	Chevrolet	193	0
28	25	13	A. J. Allmendinger (i)	Kaulig Racing	Chevrolet	193	0
29	11	9	Chase Elliott (P)	Hendrick Motorsports	Chevrolet	190	17
30	36	14	Chase Briscoe (P)	Stewart-Haas Racing	Ford	189	10
31	29	42	John Hunter Nemechek	Legacy Motor Club	Toyota	188	6
32	2	2	Austin Cindric (P)	Team Penske	Ford	183	17
33	6	22	Joey Logano (P)	Team Penske	Ford	183	4
34	9	21	Harrison Burton	Wood Brothers Racing	Ford	183	3
35	18	41	Ryan Preece	Stewart-Haas Racing	Ford	183	2
36	19	4	Josh Berry (R)	Stewart-Haas Racing	Ford	183	1
37	1	34	Michael McDowell	Front Row Motorsports	Ford	183	1
38	10	31	Daniel Hemric	Kaulig Racing	Chevrolet	183	1
39	5	12	Ryan Blaney (P)	Team Penske	Ford	124	5
40	27	1	Ross Chastain	Trackhouse Racing	Chevrolet	120	6
Official race results

=== Race statistics ===
- Lead changes: 66 among 24 different drivers
- Cautions/Laps: 4 for 24 laps
- Red flags: 1 for 8 minutes and 42 seconds
- Time of race: 3 hours, 26 minutes, and 25 seconds
- Average speed: 150.773 miles per hour (242.646 km/h)
- Margin of victory: 0.006

== Media ==
=== Television ===
NBC Sports covered the race on the television side. Leigh Diffey, Jeff Burton, and Steve Letarte called the race from the broadcast booth. Seven-time NASCAR Cup Series champion Jimmie Johnson and 1999 NASCAR Cup Series champion Dale Jarrett called from the NBC Peacock Pit Box on pit road. Dave Burns, Kim Coon, Parker Kligerman, and Marty Snider handled the pit road duties from pit lane. NBC premiered "NASCAR Nonstop", where every green flag lap was ad free.

NBC
Booth announcers	Pit reporters
Lap-by-lap: Leigh Diffey; Color-commentator: Jeff Burton; Color-commentator: Steve Letarte; NBC Peacock Pitbox: Jimmie Johnson; NBC Peacock Pitbox: Dale Jarrett	Dave Burns; Kim Coon; Parker Kligerman; Marty Snider

=== Radio ===
MRN had the radio call for the race, which was also simulcasted on Sirius XM NASCAR Radio. Alex Hayden, Jeff Striegle and Todd Gordon called the race for MRN when the field races through the tri-oval. Dave Moody will call the action from turn 1, Mike Bagley called the action for MRN when the field races down the back straightaway, and Chris Wilner called the race from the Sunoco tower just outside of turn 4. Steve Post, Dillon Welch, Brienne Pedigo, and Jason Toy called the action for MRN from pit lane.

MRN
Booth announcers	Turn announcers	Pit reporters
Lead announcer: Alex Hayden; Announcer: Jeff Striegle; Announcer: Todd Gordon	Turns 1 & 2: Dave Moody; Backstretch: Mike Bagley; Turns 3 & 4: Chris Wilner	Steve Post; Dillon Welch; Brienne Pedigo; Jason Toy

== Standings after the race ==
Drivers' Championship standings

	Pos	Driver	Points
	1	William Byron	3,122
1	2	Christopher Bell	3,105 (–17)
1	3	Kyle Larson	3,100 (–22)
1	4	Denny Hamlin	3,078 (–44)
1	5	Alex Bowman	3,074 (–48)
4	6	Ryan Blaney	3,073 (–49)
2	7	Tyler Reddick	3,062 (–60)
1	8	Chase Elliott	3,061 (–61)
1	9	Joey Logano	3,048 (–74)
	10	Daniel Suárez	3,041 (–81)
1	11	Austin Cindric	3,032 (–90)
1	12	Chase Briscoe	3,029 (–93)
	13	Ty Gibbs	2,144 (–978)
	14	Martin Truex Jr.	2,130 (–992)
	15	Brad Keselowski	2,104 (–1,018)
	16	Harrison Burton	2,048 (–1,074)
Official driver's standings

Manufacturers' Championship standings

	Pos	Manufacturer	Points
	1	Chevrolet	1,134
1	2	Ford	1,087 (–47)
1	3	Toyota	1,084 (–50)

- Note: Only the first 16 positions are included for the driver standings.

Previous race: 2024 Hollywood Casino 400	NASCAR Cup Series; 2024 season	Next race: 2024 Bank of America Roval 400
