= 2003 Virginia 500 =

Ninth race of the 2003 NASCAR Winston Cup Series

Race details
- Race 9 of 36 in the 2003 NASCAR Winston Cup Series
- The 2003 Virginia 500 program cover.
- Date: April 13, 2003
- Location: Martinsville, Virginia, Martinsville Speedway
- Course: Permanent racing facility
- Course length: 0.526 miles (0.847 km)
- Distance: 500 laps, 263 mi (423.257 km)
- Average speed: 75.557 miles per hour (121.597 km/h)

Pole position
Driver	Jeff Gordon	Hendrick Motorsports
- Time: 20.079

Most laps led
Driver	Dale Earnhardt Jr.	Dale Earnhardt, Inc.
- Laps: 195

Winner
No. 24	Jeff Gordon	Hendrick Motorsports

Television in the United States
- Network: FOX
- Announcers: Mike Joy, Larry McReynolds, Darrell Waltrip

Radio in the United States
- Radio: Motor Racing Network

The 2003 Virginia 500 was the ninth stock car race of the 2003 NASCAR Winston Cup Series season and the 54th iteration of the event. The race was held on Sunday, April 13, 2003, before an audience of 86,000 in Martinsville, Virginia at Martinsville Speedway, a 0.526 miles (0.847 km) permanent oval-shaped short track. The race took the scheduled 500 laps to complete. In the final laps of the race, Hendrick Motorsports driver Jeff Gordon would manage to pass Joe Gibbs Racing driver Bobby Labonte to capture his 62nd career NASCAR Winston Cup Series victory and his first victory of the season. To fill out the top three, Labonte and Dale Earnhardt, Inc. driver Dale Earnhardt Jr. would finish second and third, respectively.

== Background ==
The layout of Martinsville Speedway, the venue where the race was held.

Martinsville Speedway is a NASCAR-owned stock car racing track located in Henry County, in Ridgeway, Virginia, just to the south of Martinsville. At 0.526 miles (0.847 km) in length, it is the shortest track in the NASCAR Cup Series. The track was also one of the first paved oval tracks in NASCAR, being built in 1947 by H. Clay Earles. It is also the only remaining race track that has been on the NASCAR circuit from its beginning in 1948.

=== Entry list ===
- (R) denotes rookie driver.

#	Driver	Team	Make
0	Jack Sprague (R)	Haas CNC Racing	Pontiac
1	Steve Park	Dale Earnhardt, Inc.	Chevrolet
01	Jerry Nadeau*	MB2 Motorsports	Pontiac
2	Rusty Wallace	Penske Racing	Dodge
02	Hermie Sadler	SCORE Motorsports	Pontiac
4	Mike Skinner	Morgan–McClure Motorsports	Pontiac
5	Terry Labonte	Hendrick Motorsports	Chevrolet
6	Mark Martin	Roush Racing	Ford
7	Jimmy Spencer	Ultra Motorsports	Dodge
8	Dale Earnhardt Jr.	Dale Earnhardt, Inc.	Chevrolet
9	Bill Elliott	Evernham Motorsports	Dodge
10	Johnny Benson Jr.	MB2 Motorsports	Pontiac
12	Ryan Newman	Penske Racing	Dodge
15	Michael Waltrip	Dale Earnhardt, Inc.	Chevrolet
16	Greg Biffle (R)	Roush Racing	Ford
17	Matt Kenseth	Roush Racing	Ford
18	Bobby Labonte	Joe Gibbs Racing	Chevrolet
19	Jeremy Mayfield	Evernham Motorsports	Dodge
20	Tony Stewart	Joe Gibbs Racing	Chevrolet
21	Ricky Rudd	Wood Brothers Racing	Ford
22	Ward Burton	Bill Davis Racing	Dodge
23	Kenny Wallace	Bill Davis Racing	Dodge
24	Jeff Gordon	Hendrick Motorsports	Chevrolet
25	Joe Nemechek	Hendrick Motorsports	Chevrolet
29	Kevin Harvick	Richard Childress Racing	Chevrolet
30	Jeff Green	Richard Childress Racing	Chevrolet
31	Robby Gordon	Richard Childress Racing	Chevrolet
32	Ricky Craven	PPI Motorsports	Pontiac
37	Derrike Cope	Quest Motor Racing	Chevrolet
38	Elliott Sadler	Robert Yates Racing	Ford
40	Sterling Marlin	Chip Ganassi Racing	Dodge
41	Casey Mears (R)	Chip Ganassi Racing	Dodge
42	Jamie McMurray (R)	Chip Ganassi Racing	Dodge
43	John Andretti	Petty Enterprises	Dodge
45	Kyle Petty	Petty Enterprises	Dodge
48	Jimmie Johnson	Hendrick Motorsports	Chevrolet
49	Ken Schrader	BAM Racing	Dodge
54	Todd Bodine	BelCar Motorsports	Ford
74	Tony Raines (R)	BACE Motorsports	Chevrolet
77	Dave Blaney	Jasper Motorsports	Ford
88	Dale Jarrett	Robert Yates Racing	Ford
97	Kurt Busch	Roush Racing	Ford
99	Jeff Burton	Roush Racing	Ford
Official entry list

== Practice ==
=== First practice ===
The first practice session was held on Friday, April 11, at 11:20 AM EST. The session would last for two hours. Jeff Gordon, driving for Hendrick Motorsports, would set the fastest time in the session, with a lap of 20.250 and an average speed of 93.511 miles per hour (150.491 km/h).

Pos.	#	Driver	Team	Make	Time	Speed
1	24	Jeff Gordon	Hendrick Motorsports	Chevrolet	20.250	93.511
2	20	Tony Stewart	Joe Gibbs Racing	Chevrolet	20.253	93.497
3	8	Dale Earnhardt Jr.	Dale Earnhardt, Inc.	Chevrolet	20.283	93.359
Full first practice results

=== Second practice ===
The second practice session was held on Saturday, April 12, at 9:30 AM EST. The session would last for 45 minutes. Jeff Burton, driving for Roush Racing, would set the fastest time in the session, with a lap of 20.572 and an average speed of 92.047 miles per hour (148.135 km/h).

Pos.	#	Driver	Team	Make	Time	Speed
1	99	Jeff Burton	Roush Racing	Ford	20.572	92.047
2	20	Tony Stewart	Joe Gibbs Racing	Chevrolet	20.582	92.003
3	43	John Andretti	Petty Enterprises	Dodge	20.607	91.891
Full second practice results

=== Final practice ===
The final practice session, was held on Saturday, April 12, at 11:10 AM EST. The session would last for 45 minutes. Kenny Wallace, driving for Bill Davis Racing, would set the fastest time in the session, with a lap of 20.548 and an average speed of 92.155 miles per hour (148.309 km/h).

Pos.	#	Driver	Team	Make	Time	Speed
1	23	Kenny Wallace	Bill Davis Racing	Dodge	20.548	92.155
2	24	Jeff Gordon	Hendrick Motorsports	Chevrolet	20.592	91.958
3	99	Jeff Burton	Roush Racing	Ford	20.621	91.829
Full Happy Hour practice results

== Qualifying ==
Qualifying was held on Friday, April 11, at 3:05 PM EST. Each driver would have two laps to set a fastest time; the fastest of the two would count as their official qualifying lap. Positions 1-36 would be decided on time, while positions 37-43 would be based on provisionals. Six spots are awarded by the use of provisionals based on owner's points. The seventh is awarded to a past champion who has not otherwise qualified for the race. If no past champ needs the provisional, the next team in the owner points will be awarded a provisional.

Jeff Gordon, driving for Hendrick Motorsports, would win the pole, setting a time of 20.079 and an average speed of 94.308 miles per hour (151.774 km/h).

No drivers would fail to qualify.

=== Full qualifying results ===
Pos.	#	Driver	Team	Make	Time	Speed
1	24	Jeff Gordon	Hendrick Motorsports	Chevrolet	20.079	94.308
2	8	Dale Earnhardt Jr.	Dale Earnhardt, Inc.	Chevrolet	20.174	93.863
3	12	Ryan Newman	Penske Racing South	Dodge	20.214	93.678
4	49	Ken Schrader	BAM Racing	Dodge	20.233	93.590
5	2	Rusty Wallace	Penske Racing South	Dodge	20.243	93.543
6	25	Joe Nemechek	Hendrick Motorsports	Chevrolet	20.278	93.382
7	48	Jimmie Johnson	Hendrick Motorsports	Chevrolet	20.313	93.221
8	20	Tony Stewart	Joe Gibbs Racing	Chevrolet	20.329	93.148
9	23	Kenny Wallace	Bill Davis Racing	Dodge	20.334	93.125
10	99	Jeff Burton	Roush Racing	Ford	20.336	93.116
11	42	Jamie McMurray (R)	Chip Ganassi Racing	Dodge	20.336	93.116
12	22	Ward Burton	Bill Davis Racing	Dodge	20.337	93.111
13	7	Jimmy Spencer	Ultra Motorsports	Dodge	20.337	93.111
14	0	Jack Sprague (R)	Haas CNC Racing	Pontiac	20.345	93.075
15	77	Dave Blaney	Jasper Motorsports	Ford	20.346	93.070
16	5	Terry Labonte	Hendrick Motorsports	Chevrolet	20.362	92.997
17	32	Ricky Craven	PPI Motorsports	Pontiac	20.369	92.965
18	38	Elliott Sadler	Robert Yates Racing	Ford	20.375	92.937
19	21	Ricky Rudd	Wood Brothers Racing	Ford	20.381	92.910
20	16	Greg Biffle (R)	Roush Racing	Ford	20.383	92.901
21	4	Mike Skinner	Morgan–McClure Motorsports	Pontiac	20.389	92.874
22	41	Casey Mears (R)	Chip Ganassi Racing	Dodge	20.392	92.860
23	19	Jeremy Mayfield	Evernham Motorsports	Dodge	20.407	92.792
24	6	Mark Martin	Roush Racing	Ford	20.411	92.773
25	40	Sterling Marlin	Chip Ganassi Racing	Dodge	20.412	92.769
26	01	Jerry Nadeau	MB2 Motorsports	Pontiac	20.412	92.769
27	74	Tony Raines (R)	BACE Motorsports	Chevrolet	20.419	92.737
28	10	Johnny Benson Jr.	MBV Motorsports	Pontiac	20.424	92.715
29	29	Kevin Harvick	Richard Childress Racing	Chevrolet	20.434	92.669
30	15	Michael Waltrip	Dale Earnhardt, Inc.	Chevrolet	20.445	92.619
31	9	Bill Elliott	Evernham Motorsports	Dodge	20.450	92.597
32	1	Steve Park	Dale Earnhardt, Inc.	Chevrolet	20.456	92.569
33	45	Kyle Petty	Petty Enterprises	Dodge	20.472	92.497
34	17	Matt Kenseth	Roush Racing	Ford	20.484	92.443
35	30	Jeff Green	Richard Childress Racing	Chevrolet	20.484	92.443
36	97	Kurt Busch	Roush Racing	Ford	20.497	92.384
Provisionals
37	88	Dale Jarrett	Robert Yates Racing	Ford	20.509	92.330
38	31	Robby Gordon	Richard Childress Racing	Chevrolet	20.503	92.357
39	18	Bobby Labonte	Joe Gibbs Racing	Chevrolet	20.605	91.900
40	43	John Andretti	Petty Enterprises	Dodge	20.505	92.348
41	54	Todd Bodine	BelCar Motorsports	Ford	20.590	91.967
42	37	Derrike Cope	Quest Motor Racing	Chevrolet	20.699	91.483
43	02	Hermie Sadler	SCORE Motorsports	Chevrolet	20.676	91.584
Official qualifying results

== Race results ==
Fin	St	#	Driver	Team	Make	Laps	Led	Status	Pts	Winnings
1	1	24	Jeff Gordon	Hendrick Motorsports	Chevrolet	500	190	running	180	$219,143
2	39	18	Bobby Labonte	Joe Gibbs Racing	Chevrolet	500	49	running	175	$138,348
3	2	8	Dale Earnhardt Jr.	Dale Earnhardt, Inc.	Chevrolet	500	195	running	175	$112,542
4	10	99	Jeff Burton	Roush Racing	Ford	500	0	running	160	$101,592
5	18	38	Elliott Sadler	Robert Yates Racing	Ford	500	5	running	160	$98,950
6	8	20	Tony Stewart	Joe Gibbs Racing	Chevrolet	500	11	running	155	$105,953
7	25	40	Sterling Marlin	Chip Ganassi Racing	Dodge	500	23	running	151	$97,275
8	5	2	Rusty Wallace	Penske Racing South	Dodge	500	13	running	147	$91,217
9	7	48	Jimmie Johnson	Hendrick Motorsports	Chevrolet	500	0	running	138	$70,250
10	4	49	Ken Schrader	BAM Racing	Dodge	500	0	running	134	$54,050
11	19	21	Ricky Rudd	Wood Brothers Racing	Ford	500	0	running	130	$78,650
12	9	23	Kenny Wallace	Bill Davis Racing	Dodge	500	0	running	127	$68,225
13	31	9	Bill Elliott	Evernham Motorsports	Dodge	499	0	running	124	$88,358
14	16	5	Terry Labonte	Hendrick Motorsports	Chevrolet	499	1	running	126	$78,581
15	6	25	Joe Nemechek	Hendrick Motorsports	Chevrolet	499	0	running	118	$53,750
16	29	29	Kevin Harvick	Richard Childress Racing	Chevrolet	499	13	running	120	$87,678
17	24	6	Mark Martin	Roush Racing	Ford	499	0	running	112	$85,433
18	20	16	Greg Biffle (R)	Roush Racing	Ford	499	0	running	109	$47,975
19	13	7	Jimmy Spencer	Ultra Motorsports	Dodge	499	0	running	106	$63,575
20	37	88	Dale Jarrett	Robert Yates Racing	Ford	499	0	running	103	$94,303
21	38	31	Robby Gordon	Richard Childress Racing	Chevrolet	499	0	running	100	$75,262
22	34	17	Matt Kenseth	Roush Racing	Ford	499	0	running	97	$66,725
23	30	15	Michael Waltrip	Dale Earnhardt, Inc.	Chevrolet	499	0	running	94	$63,975
24	32	1	Steve Park	Dale Earnhardt, Inc.	Chevrolet	499	0	running	91	$74,562
25	12	22	Ward Burton	Bill Davis Racing	Dodge	499	0	running	88	$82,931
26	35	30	Jeff Green	Richard Childress Racing	Chevrolet	498	0	running	85	$56,825
27	17	32	Ricky Craven	PPI Motorsports	Pontiac	498	0	running	82	$67,010
28	36	97	Kurt Busch	Roush Racing	Ford	498	0	running	79	$64,910
29	14	0	Jack Sprague (R)	Haas CNC Racing	Pontiac	497	0	running	76	$44,725
30	40	43	John Andretti	Petty Enterprises	Dodge	497	0	running	73	$84,178
31	15	77	Dave Blaney	Jasper Motorsports	Ford	497	0	running	70	$64,064
32	28	10	Johnny Benson Jr.	MBV Motorsports	Pontiac	497	0	running	67	$74,200
33	27	74	Tony Raines (R)	BACE Motorsports	Chevrolet	496	0	running	64	$45,025
34	33	45	Kyle Petty	Petty Enterprises	Dodge	496	0	running	61	$55,000
35	21	4	Mike Skinner	Morgan–McClure Motorsports	Pontiac	496	0	running	58	$46,950
36	22	41	Casey Mears (R)	Chip Ganassi Racing	Dodge	496	0	running	55	$54,400
37	41	54	Todd Bodine	BelCar Motorsports	Ford	492	0	running	52	$43,850
38	3	12	Ryan Newman	Penske Racing South	Dodge	436	0	brakes	49	$74,665
39	11	42	Jamie McMurray (R)	Chip Ganassi Racing	Dodge	319	0	engine	46	$43,740
40	23	19	Jeremy Mayfield	Evernham Motorsports	Dodge	308	0	overheating	43	$51,665
41	26	01	Jerry Nadeau	MB2 Motorsports	Pontiac	267	0	oil pump	40	$43,615
42	42	37	Derrike Cope	Quest Motor Racing	Chevrolet	230	0	throttle	37	$43,575
43	43	02	Hermie Sadler	SCORE Motorsports	Chevrolet	133	0	engine	34	$42,866
Official race results

Previous race: 2003 Aaron's 499	NASCAR Winston Cup Series; 2003 season	Next race: 2003 Auto Club 500
