= 2003 Aaron's 499 =

Race details
- Race 8 of 36 in the 2003 NASCAR Winston Cup Series season
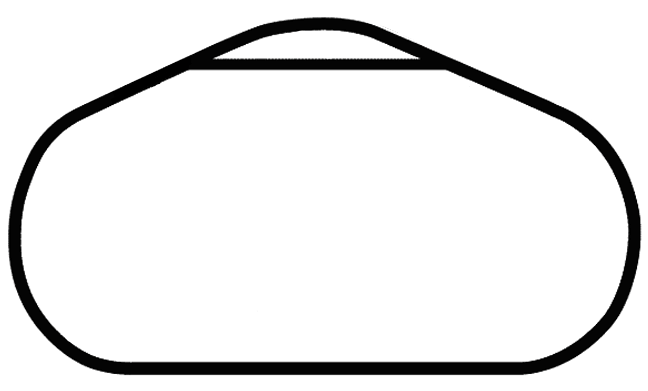
- Layout of Talladega Superspeedway
- Date: April 6, 2003
- Location: Talladega Superspeedway, Talladega, Alabama
- Course: Permanent racing facility
- Course length: 2.66 miles (4.28 km)
- Distance: 188 laps, 500.08 mi (804.8 km)
- Weather: Mild with temperatures approaching 78.1 °F (25.6 °C); wind speeds reaching up to 12 miles per hour (19 km/h)
- Average speed: 144.625 miles per hour (232.751 km/h)

Pole position
Driver	Jeremy Mayfield	Evernham Motorsports
- Time: 51.349

Most laps led
Driver	Jimmie Johnson	Hendrick Motorsports
- Laps: 65

Winner
No. 8	Dale Earnhardt Jr.	Dale Earnhardt, Inc.

Television in the United States
- Network: Fox Broadcasting Company
- Announcers: Mike Joy, Darrell Waltrip and Larry McReynolds

The 2003 Aaron's 499 was held on April 6, 2003, at Talladega Superspeedway in Talladega, Alabama. It was the eighth race of 36 in the 2003 NASCAR Winston Cup Series season. Jeremy Mayfield was the polesitter.

Dale Earnhardt Jr. won the race, his first win of the season and fourth consecutive at Talladega, becoming the 8th different winner in the first 8 races, while Kevin Harvick finished second and Elliott Sadler finished third. This was also the fifth consecutive restrictor plate race win for Dale Earnhardt, Inc. stretching back to the previous year's spring Talladega race. There were six cautions, 16 different leaders, and 43 lead changes. The Big One did not take long, collecting 27 cars on the fourth lap — the second largest crash in a Cup race in the modern era, behind the 2024 YellaWood 500.

== Race Summary ==
=== The "Big One" ===
On lap 4, as the field entered turn 1, Ryan Newman (who already had a violent blowover at the rain shortened Daytona 500 in February) blew a tire and smashed hard into the turn 1 wall, almost turning over on his side and spinning across the middle of the track, collecting an additional 26 cars. Mayhem ensued as cars behind him checked up trying to avoid Newman, whose car suddenly burst into flames. One of Newman's tires came off and got struck by Ricky Rudd's hood, causing it to bounce right over the catch fence and land in a restricted access area.

A total of 27 cars were involved, making it the largest recorded crash in the history of the NASCAR Winston Cup Series until the 2024 YellaWood 500 at the same track that took out 28 cars. It was also the third largest-crash overall in modern NASCAR, behind a 30 car crash on the back straightaway in Talladega's Busch race the year before. Damage to the cars involved ranged from no damage to severe damage; Hermie Sadler, Casey Mears, Johnny Benson Jr., and some others were out immediately. Rusty Wallace and Jerry Nadeau returned but retired after making a limited number of laps following repairs. Matt Kenseth and race winner Dale Earnhardt Jr. also had minor damage. Kenseth finished inside the Top 10 on the lead lap. After the wreck, there were only 16 cars that did not have damage. Coincidentally, during the Busch race the day prior, the "Big One" occurred in turn 4 on lap 10 when Johnny Sauter blew a tire in the middle of the pack, collecting 22 cars.

==== Cars involved in the crash ====
1. 0- Jack Sprague
2. 01- Jerry Nadeau
3. 02- Hermie Sadler
4. 09- Mike Wallace
5. 1- Steve Park
6. 2- Rusty Wallace
7. 4- Mike Skinner
8. 6- Mark Martin
9. 7- Jimmy Spencer
10. 8- Dale Earnhardt Jr. (eventual winner)
11. 10- Johnny Benson Jr.
12. 12- Ryan Newman
13. 16- Greg Biffle
14. 17- Matt Kenseth (championship points leader)
15. 18- Bobby Labonte
16. 20- Tony Stewart
17. 21- Ricky Rudd
18. 25- Joe Nemechek
19. 30- Jeff Green
20. 41- Casey Mears
21. 42- Jamie McMurray
22. 43- John Andretti
23. 45- Kyle Petty
24. 49- Ken Schrader
25. 54- Todd Bodine
26. 77- Dave Blaney
27. 99- Jeff Burton

=== Dale Earnhardt Jr.'s comeback ===
Perhaps the most well noted one involved in the Big One was Dale Earnhardt Jr., who started in 43rd place because of an engine change after qualifying. In the crash, Earnhardt Jr. went off the banking and down into the grass, making contact with Jeff Green's car that damaged his fender. He struggled for most of the race, at times going close to a half-lap down, until late in the race when he took the lead away from Matt Kenseth, who was also involved earlier, and won his fourth straight race at Talladega. Earnhardt Jr. swept the weekend, having won the Busch Series race the previous day. Jimmie Johnson led the most laps of the race, but had a 15th-place finish when he spun out right before the white flag. By coincidence, the Big Ones that unfolded in both the weekend's Cup and Busch races at Talladega were the result of a car blowing a tire in the middle of the track (Ryan Newman in turn 1 in the Cup race, and Johnny Sauter in turn 4 in the Busch race the day prior).

=== Double yellow line controversy ===
Earnhardt Jr. was involved in a controversial decision at the end of the race where it appeared he went below the yellow line in an attempt to improve position. As the cars were racing down the back straightaway, leader Matt Kenseth made a lane change, going to the outside to block Jimmie Johnson. Earnhardt Jr. was on the inside and was drafting with Elliott Sadler when Kenseth started moving low in an attempt to block Earnhardt; Earnhardt stormed well below the line entering the turn three apron as he passed Kenseth. NASCAR ruled that Earnhardt was forced below the line as his car's nose had already passed Kenseth's nose by the time Kenseth made the block, making it a clean pass in their opinion, this even though Earnhardt was nowhere close to clearing Kenseth when he hit the apron — what the rule was ostensibly intended to prevent. Some sanctioning bodies, such as the Indy Racing League, would have called Kenseth for violating the blocking rule — a driver is not allowed to make two lane changes on a straightaway, which is a penalty; the ethic against blocking, however, holds no weight in NASCAR given the fendered nature of the cars. The yellow line rule's absurdity belatedly led to discussion in the sanctioning body in January 2010 to possibly rescind it, though it was decided to maintain the rule "for the time being," according to NASCAR official Robin Pemberton.

In the years to come, the yellow lines would provide several controversial moments, such as Regan Smith being penalized by passing Tony Stewart below the yellow line in the fall race in 2008, as well as a confusing finish in 2020. NASCAR decided to put another yellow line for the next year, in both Daytona and Talladega.

== Race results ==
Pos.	Car #	Driver	Make	Team
1	8	Dale Earnhardt Jr.	Chevrolet	Dale Earnhardt Inc.
2	29	Kevin Harvick	Chevrolet	Richard Childress Racing
3	38	Elliott Sadler	Ford	Robert Yates Racing
4	32	Ricky Craven	Pontiac	PPI Motorsports
5	5	Terry Labonte	Chevrolet	Hendrick Motorsports
6	40	Sterling Marlin	Dodge	Chip Ganassi Racing with Felix Sabates
7	22	Ward Burton	Dodge	Bill Davis Racing
8	24	Jeff Gordon	Chevrolet	Hendrick Motorsports
9	17	Matt Kenseth	Ford	Roush Racing
10	31	Robby Gordon	Chevrolet	Richard Childress Racing
11	45	Kyle Petty	Dodge	Petty Enterprises
12	88	Dale Jarrett	Ford	Robert Yates Racing
13	9	Bill Elliott	Dodge	Evernham Motorsports
14	43	John Andretti	Dodge	Petty Enterprises
15	48	Jimmie Johnson	Chevrolet	Hendrick Motorsports
16	74	Tony Raines	Chevrolet	BACE Motorsports
17	23	Kenny Wallace	Dodge	Bill Davis Racing
18	19	Jeremy Mayfield	Dodge	Evernham Motorsports
19	97	Kurt Busch	Ford	Roush Fenway
20	1	Steve Park	Chevrolet	Dale Earnhardt, Inc.
21	25	Joe Nemechek	Chevrolet	Hendrick Motorsports
22	16	Greg Biffle	Ford	Roush Fenway
23	77	Dave Blaney	Ford	Jasper Motorsports
24	15	Michael Waltrip	Chevrolet	Dale Earnhardt, Inc.
25	20	Tony Stewart	Chevrolet	Joe Gibbs Racing
26	6	Mark Martin	Ford	Roush Racing
27	42	Jamie McMurray	Dodge	Chip Ganassi Racing with Felix Sabates
28	54	Todd Bodine	Ford	BelCar Racing
29	30	Jeff Green	Chevrolet	Richard Childress Racing
30	09	Mike Wallace	Dodge	Phoenix Racing
31	4	Mike Skinner	Pontiac	Morgan–McClure Motorsports
32	18	Bobby Labonte	Chevrolet	Joe Gibbs Racing
33	49	Ken Schrader	Dodge	BAM Racing
34	0	Jack Sprague	Pontiac	Haas CNC Racing
35	99	Jeff Burton	Ford	Roush Racing
36	01	Jerry Nadeau	Pontiac	MB2 Motorsports
37	2	Rusty Wallace	Dodge	Penske Racing
38	7	Jimmy Spencer	Dodge	Ultra Motorsports
39	12	Ryan Newman	Dodge	Penske Racing
40	41	Casey Mears	Dodge	Chip Ganassi Racing with Felix Sabates
41	10	Johnny Benson Jr.	Pontiac	MB2 Motorsports
42	21	Ricky Rudd	Ford	Wood Brothers Racing
43	02	Hermie Sadler	Chevrolet	SCORE Motorsports

=== Failed to qualify ===
- Brett Bodine (#11)
- Larry Foyt (#14)
- David Green (#60), time disallowed

== Race facts ==
- Average speed: 144.625 miles per hour (232.751 km/h)
- Margin of victory: .125 seconds
- Time of race: 03:27:28
- Lead changes: 43 among 16 different drivers
- Cautions: 6 for 32 laps
1. Laps 5-13: The "Big One" in turn 2
2. Laps 37-40: Debris
3. Laps 64-67: Debris
4. Laps 84-89: Michael Waltrip, Elliott Sadler, and Jeremy Mayfield crash in turn 3
5. Laps 91-94: Greg Biffle, Kurt Busch, and Tony Stewart crash in turn 4
6. Laps 133-137: Debris
- Percent of race run under caution: 17.0%
- Average green flag run: 22.3 laps

== Points standings after race ==
1. Matt Kenseth 1233 (Leader)
2. Dale Earnhardt Jr. 1104 (-129)
3. Kurt Busch 1046 (-187)
4. Jimmie Johnson 1013 (-220)
5. Jeff Gordon 1011 (-222)
6. Ricky Craven 1000 (-223)
7. Michael Waltrip 994 (-239)
8. Kevin Harvick 977 (-256)
9. Tony Stewart 937 (-296)
10. Elliott Sadler 895 (-338)

== See also ==
- The Big One (motorsport)

Previous race: 2003 Samsung/Radio Shack 500	Winston Cup Series; 2003 season	Next race: 2003 Virginia 500
