= Richard Childress Racing in the NASCAR Cup Series =

American professional stock car racing team

RCR Enterprises, LLC, doing business as Richard Childress Racing (RCR), is an American professional stock car racing team that currently competes in the NASCAR Cup Series and the NASCAR O'Reilly Auto Parts Series. The team is based in Welcome, North Carolina, and is owned and operated by former driver Richard Childress.

In the Cup Series, the team currently fields two Chevrolet Camaro ZL1s: the No. 3 for Austin Dillon and the No. 33 for Austin Hill. RCR has won the NASCAR Cup Series championship six times, all with driver Dale Earnhardt, as well as the Daytona 500 three times.

== Cars ==
=== Car No. 07 history ===
Dave Blaney (2005)

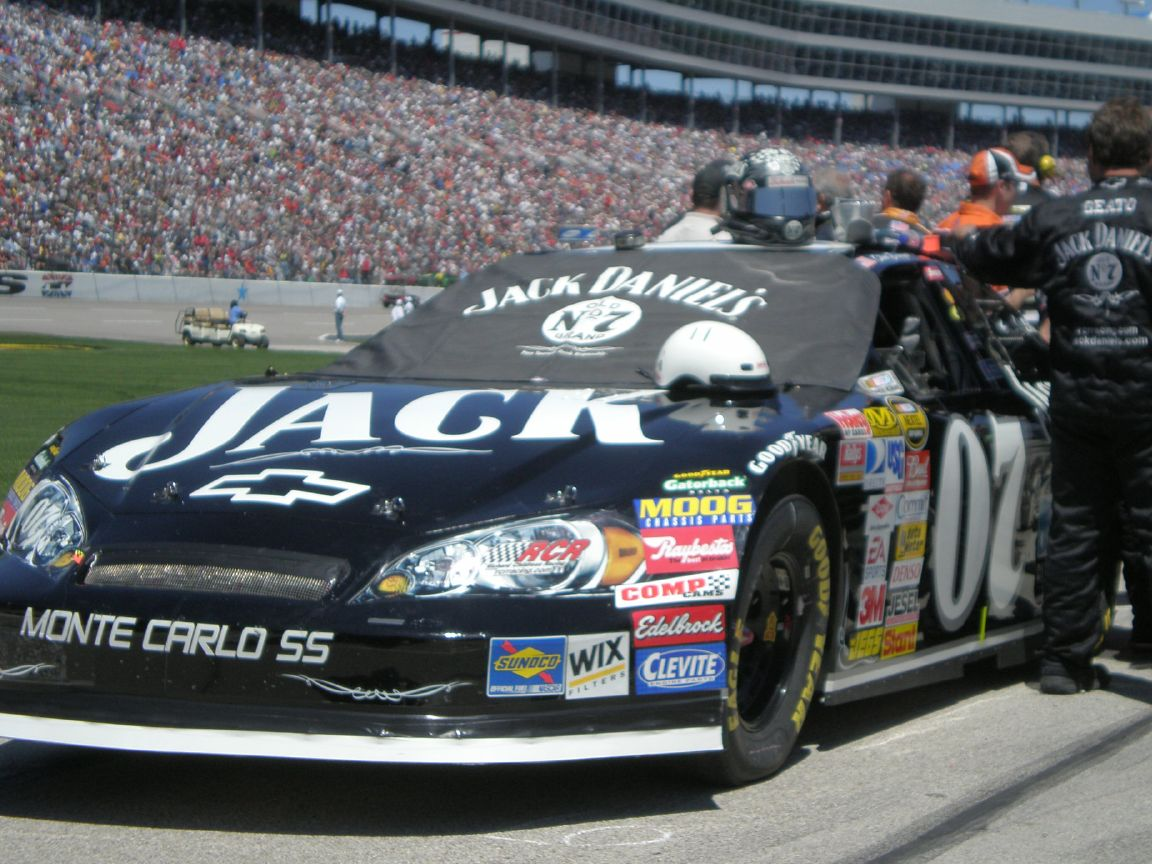
Clint Bowyer in the No. 07 car in 2007.

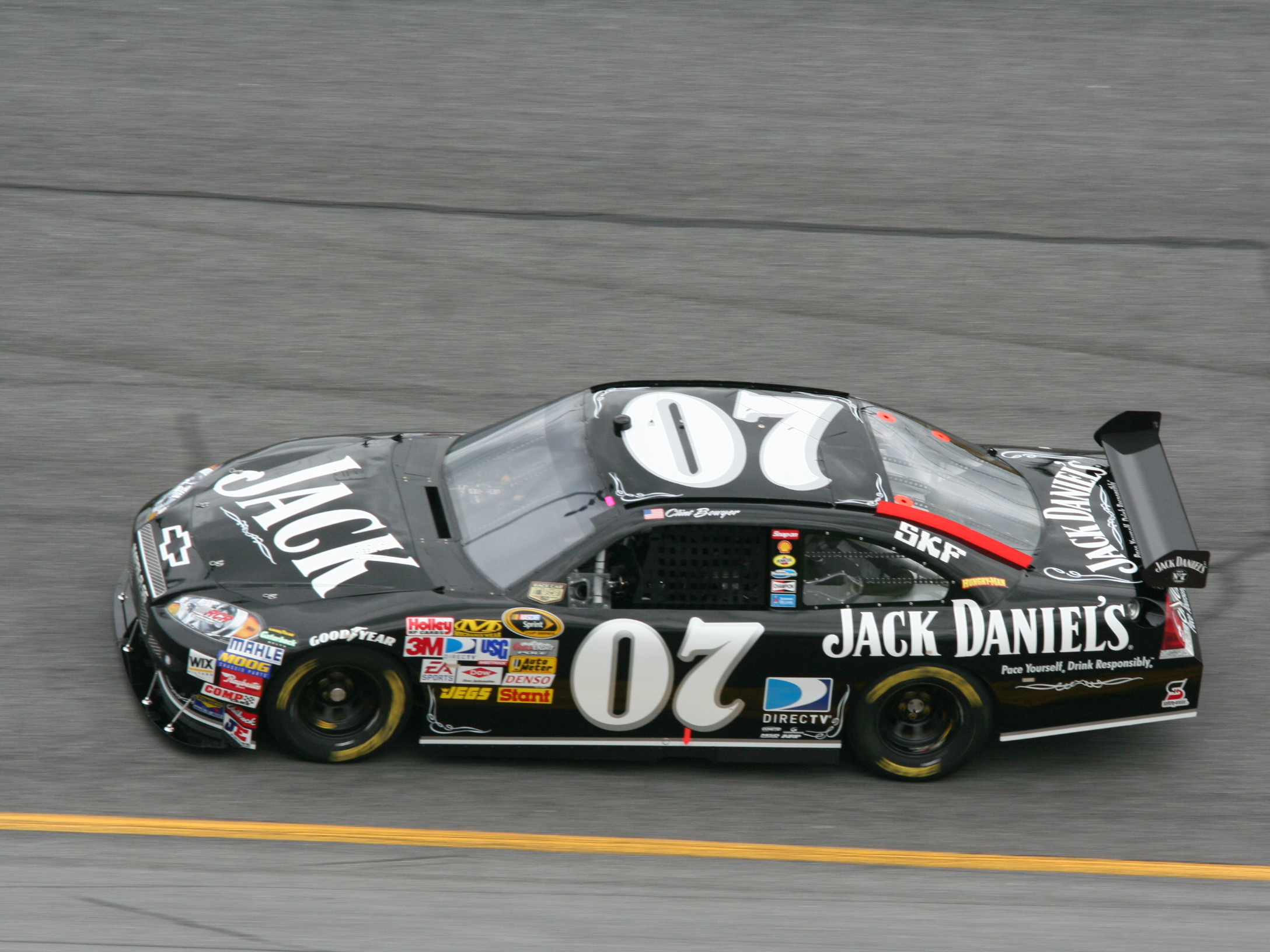
Bowyer at Daytona in 2008.

With AOL leaving as sponsor, Childress had two voids left to fill. He decided to rehire Dave Blaney, and signed Jack Daniel's to sponsor the car, marking one of the first hard liquor sponsorships in NASCAR's history. The team also used number 07 to commemorate JD's slogan "Ol' No. 7". Blaney posted just 2 top ten finishes during 2005, finishing 26th in the standings.

Clint Bowyer (2006–2008)

Blaney moved to Bill Davis Racing in 2006, while rookie Clint Bowyer was placed in the No. 07 Jack Daniels Chevrolet for RCR. In his second season, Bowyer took the first win for this team at the Sylvania 300 at Loudon. Bowyer finished third in the final standings in 2007. In 2008, Bowyer got his second win at Richmond at the Crown Royal Presents The Dan Lowry 400, and finished fifth in points.

Casey Mears (2009)

On August 23, 2008, former Hendrick Motorsports driver Casey Mears was signed to drive the 07 in 2009, with Bowyer moving to the No. 33. Mears struggled in the new ride, however, and had to take on three crew chiefs during the season. More troubling was the fact that Jack Daniel's announced on September 21, 2009, that they would be leaving RCR at the end of the year, leaving the 07 without a sponsor. Childress decided to release Mears at the end of the year, after just 4 top tens and a 21st place points finish.

==== Car No. 07 results ====
Year	Driver	No.	Make	1	2	3	4	5	6	7	8	9	10	11	12	13	14	15	16	17	18	19	20	21	22	23	24	25	26	27	28	29	30	31	32	33	34	35	36	Owners	Pts
2005	Dave Blaney	07	Chevy	DAY; 14	CAL; 34	LVS; 13	ATL; 8	BRI; 20	MAR; 34	TEX; 26	PHO; 24	TAL; 19	DAR; 29	RCH; 27	CLT; 29	DOV; 36	POC; 24	MCH; 29	SON; 19	DAY; 27	CHI; 38	NHA; 20	POC; 20	IND; 30	GLN; 34	MCH; 32	BRI; 23	CAL; 22	RCH; 33	NHA; 33	DOV; 20	TAL; 15	KAN; 25	CLT; 13	MAR; 16	ATL; 24	TEX; 28	PHO; 25	HOM; 6	27th	3289
2006	Clint Bowyer	07	Chevy	DAY; 6	CAL; 14	LVS; 15	ATL; 27	BRI; 29	MAR; 22	TEX; 19	PHO; 5	TAL; 40	RCH; 10	DAR; 23	CLT; 19	DOV; 17	POC; 21	MCH; 39	SON; 16	DAY; 10	CHI; 9	NHA; 27	POC; 41	IND; 4	GLN; 14	MCH; 33	BRI; 38	CAL; 3	RCH; 12	NHA; 24	DOV; 8	KAN; 9	TAL; 35	CLT; 23	MAR; 23	ATL; 25	TEX; 5	PHO; 33	HOM; 10	17th	3833
2007	Clint Bowyer	07	Chevy	DAY; 18	CAL; 6	LVS; 36	ATL; 6	BRI; 8	MAR; 11	TEX; 16	PHO; 22	TAL; 35	RCH; 9	DAR; 9	CLT; 29	DOV; 8	POC; 10	MCH; 16	SON; 4	NHA; 37	DAY; 7	CHI; 10	IND; 13	POC; 8	GLN; 16	MCH; 17	BRI; 3	CAL; 20	RCH; 12	NHA; 1*	DOV; 12	KAN; 2	TAL; 11	CLT; 2	MAR; 9	ATL; 6	TEX; 19	PHO; 11	HOM; 39	3rd	6377
2008	Clint Bowyer	07	Chevy	DAY; 24	CAL; 19	LVS; 28	ATL; 6	BRI; 3	MAR; 10	TEX; 10	PHO; 2	TAL; 9	RCH; 1	DAR; 15	CLT; 25	DOV; 36	POC; 39	MCH; 26	SON; 4	NHA; 22	DAY; 9	CHI; 22	IND; 19	POC; 6	GLN; 23	MCH; 20	BRI; 7	CAL; 10	RCH; 12	NHA; 12	DOV; 8	KAN; 12	TAL; 5	CLT; 12	MAR; 9	ATL; 20	TEX; 4	PHO; 12	HOM; 5	5th	6381
2009	Casey Mears	07	Chevy	DAY; 15	CAL; 24	LVS; 30	ATL; 16	BRI; 24	MAR; 21	TEX; 21	PHO; 20	TAL; 16	RCH; 9	DAR; 36	CLT; 33	DOV; 9	POC; 14	MCH; 24	SON; 23	NHA; 11	DAY; 34	CHI; 28	IND; 19	POC; 25	GLN; 15	MCH; 6	BRI; 13	ATL; 25	RCH; 30	NHA; 13	DOV; 17	KAN; 15	CAL; 11	CLT; 7	MAR; 18	TAL; 25	TEX; 21	PHO; 27	HOM; 19	21st	3759

=== Car No. 8 history ===
Kirk Shelmerdine (1981)

The No. 8 car debuted in 1981 at Texas World Speedway as McDonald's sponsored Pontiac with Kirk Shelmerdine as the driver. He finished 33rd.

Daniel Hemric (2018–2019)

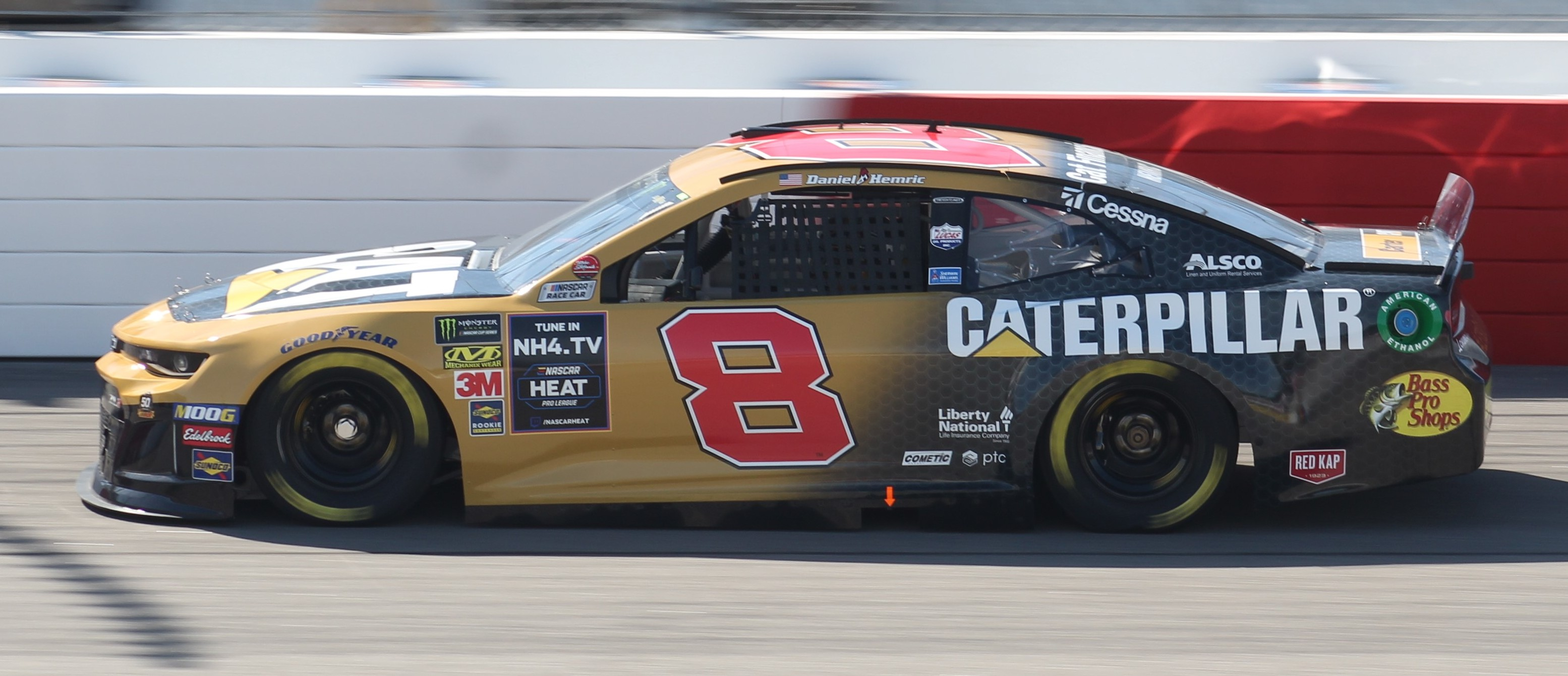
Hemric's No. 8 Cup Series car at Richmond in 2019

The No. 8 car returned in 2018 running part-time with Daniel Hemric making his Cup series debut at the spring Richmond race and the Charlotte Roval race. The car was sponsored by Smokey Mountain Herbal Snuff, who sponsored Hemric in four races of the 2017 Xfinity Series season. Hemric finished 32nd at Richmond and 23rd at Charlotte.

It was announced on December 14, 2018, that the No. 31 team would be changing numbers to No. 8 for the 2019 season. Despite winning one pole, the No. 8 was largely inconsistent and struggled to compete on a weekly basis, scoring a season-best finish of 5th at the spring Talladega race and a 25th-place finish in the standings. On September 17, 2019, RCR announced that Hemric would be released from his contract at the end of the season.

Tyler Reddick (2020–2022)

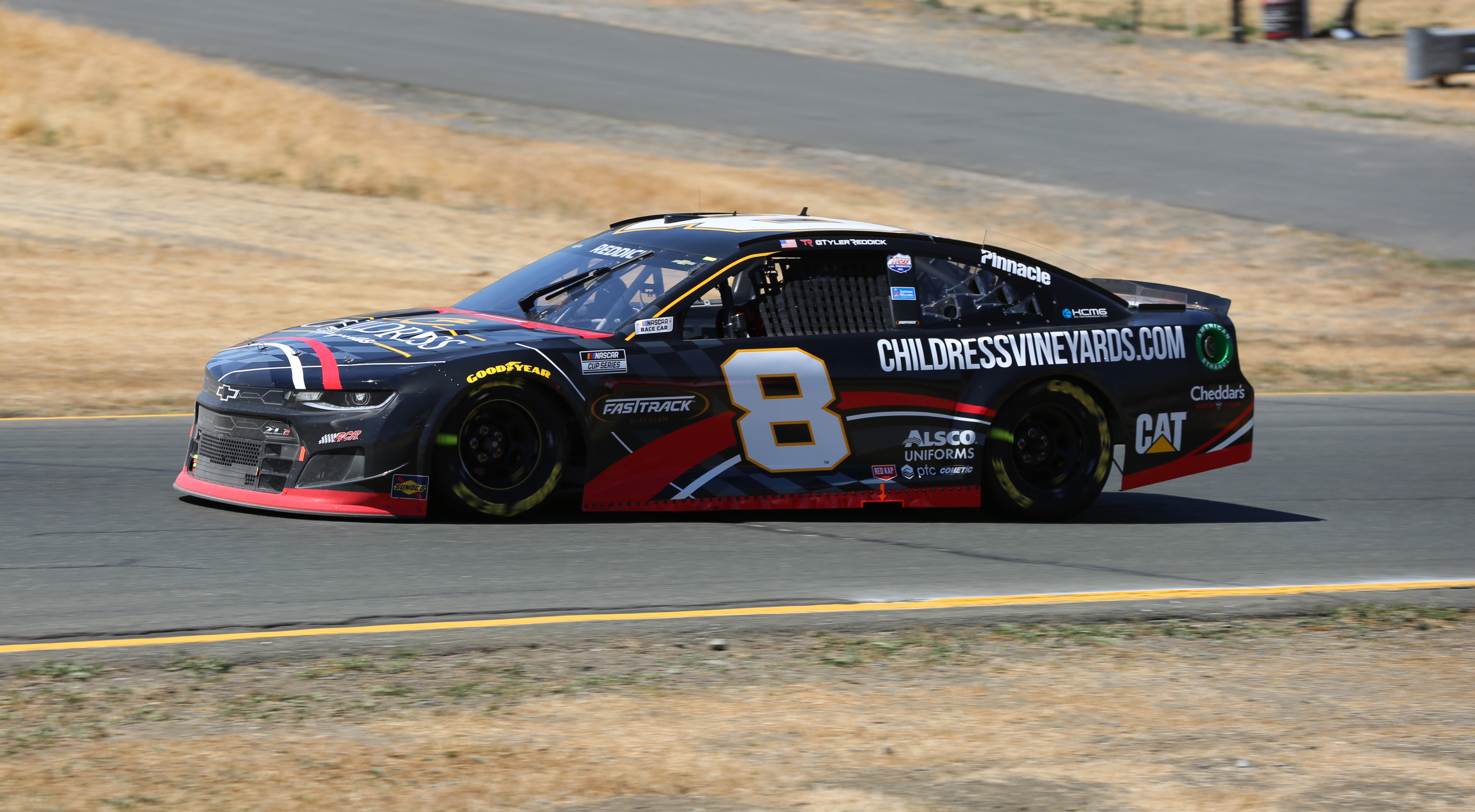
Tyler Reddick in the No. 8 at Sonoma in 2021

On October 2, 2019, RCR officially announced Tyler Reddick as the driver of the No. 8 for the 2020 season. The team had a vast improvement, scoring nine top 10s and a runner-up finish in the first Texas race. Reddick ended the season 19th in the standings.

The 2021 season saw Reddick become more consistent in his finishes, with one top-fives and ten top-10 finishes during the regular season. A fifth-place finish at the 2021 Coke Zero Sugar 400 at Daytona enabled him to make the playoffs for the first time. Reddick was eliminated from the playoffs following the conclusion of the Round of 16 at Bristol.

Reddick began the 2022 season with a 35th-place finish at the 2022 Daytona 500. At the Bristol dirt race, he battled Chase Briscoe for the lead on the closing laps when Briscoe lost control and caused both cars to slide on the final turn, leading to Reddick finishing second to Kyle Busch. At Road America, Reddick held off Chase Elliott to score his first career Cup Series win. On July 12, 2022, it was announced that Reddick had signed with 23XI Racing for a full-time Cup ride in 2024. At the Indianapolis Road Course, Reddick held off the field in overtime to win his second race of the season. Reddick was eliminated in the Round of 16 after being involved in a multi-car pileup at the Bristol night race. Despite his elimination, he scored his third career win at Texas a week later. Reddick retired from the Martinsville playoff race early, as he was not feeling well.

Kyle Busch (2023–2026)

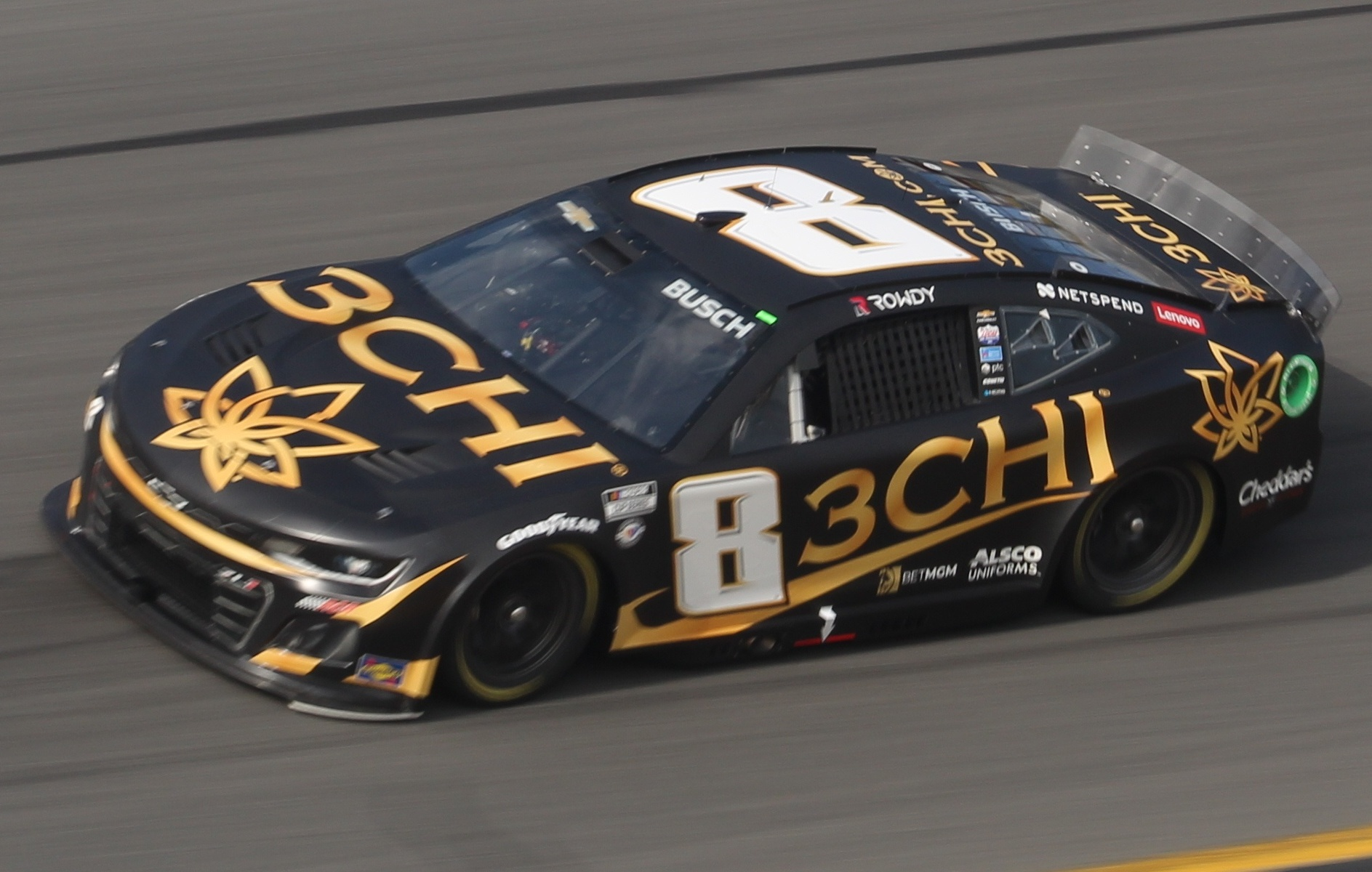
Kyle Busch in the No. 8 at Daytona in 2023

On September 13, 2022, it was announced that Kyle Busch would be taking over the No. 8 beginning in 2023. Busch began the season with a 19th-place finish at the 2023 Daytona 500. A week later, he scored his first win with RCR and 61st career victory at Fontana. Busch later scored wins at Talladega and Gateway. He was eliminated from the Round of 12 at the conclusion of the Charlotte Roval race. On June 3, Busch crashed during a Goodyear tire test at Indianapolis.

Busch began the 2024 season with a 12th-place finish at the Daytona 500. The following week, he finished third in a thrilling three-wide photo finish at Atlanta, just 0.007 seconds behind Daniel Suárez, who claimed the win, with Ryan Blaney taking second. On lap 2 of the All-Star Race, Busch made contact with the wall while battling Ricky Stenhouse Jr.. He then collided with Stenhouse's car from behind, sending him into the wall and ending his race. Afterward, Stenhouse expressed his intention to confront Busch. He approached Busch at his hauler in the infield, and the two drivers exchanged words about the incident. The argument escalated when Stenhouse threw a punch, triggering a brawl involving both drivers' crews and Stenhouse's father. However, despite finishing second in the final two regular-season races at Daytona and Darlington, Busch failed to make the playoffs. This marked the first time since 2012, and the first time in the history of the modern playoff format, that Busch missed the playoffs. Additionally, he went winless for the first time in his full-time career, ending a 19-year streak of at least one win per season.

Busch started off the 2025 season with a 34th-place finish at the Daytona 500 after being caught up in a late race wreck. However, he followed this race up with a 7th at Atlanta and a dominant performance at Circuit of the Americas, leading the most laps on the day (42), and finishing 5th after falling back in the final few laps. However, Busch struggled for most of the season, collecting only two top fives and seven top tens, ultimately failing to make the playoffs for the second season in a row.

Busch started the 2026 season with a 15th-place finish at the Daytona 500. Just as the previous season, he struggled during the first 12 races, scoring only two top-10 finishes while crew chief Jim Pohlman was replaced by Andy Street after 10 races. On May 21, Busch died suddenly due to an illness. Two days later, it was revealed that Busch had severe pneumonia that progressed into sepsis. Following the passing of Busch, RCR announced it will suspend the use of the No. 8 and renumber the team to the No. 33 starting at the Coca-Cola 600, with Austin Hill scheduled for the race. RCR also stated the No. 8 will be reserved for Busch's son Brexton, should he decide to pursue a NASCAR career.

==== Car No. 8 results ====
Year	Driver	No.	Make	1	2	3	4	5	6	7	8	9	10	11	12	13	14	15	16	17	18	19	20	21	22	23	24	25	26	27	28	29	30	31	32	33	34	35	36	Owners	Pts
1981	Kirk Shelmerdine	8	Pontiac	RSD	DAY	RCH	CAR	ATL	BRI	NWS	DAR	MAR	TAL	NSV	DOV	CLT	TWS; 33	RSD	MCH	DAY	NSV	POC	TAL	MCH	BRI	DAR	RCH	DOV	MAR	NWS	CLT	CAR	ATL	RSD						NA	0
2018	Daniel Hemric	8	Chevy	DAY	ATL	LVS	PHO	CAL	MAR	TEX	BRI	RCH; 32	TAL	DOV	KAN	CLT	POC	MCH	SON	CHI	DAY	KEN	NHA	POC	GLN	MCH	BRI	DAR	IND	LVS	RCH	ROV; 23	DOV	TAL	KAN	MAR	TEX	PHO	HOM	43rd	20
2019	Daniel Hemric	8	Chevy	DAY; 34	ATL; 20	LVS; 23	PHO; 18	CAL; 33	MAR; 27	TEX; 33	BRI; 30	RCH; 19	TAL; 5	DOV; 25	KAN; 18	CLT; 21	POC; 13	MCH; 12	SON; 15	CHI; 19	DAY; 18	KEN; 24	NHA; 37	POC; 7	GLN; 35	MCH; 26	BRI; 12	DAR; 37	IND; 34	LVS; 17	RCH; 25	ROV; 33	DOV; 21	TAL; 21	KAN; 31	MAR; 17	TEX; 16	PHO; 21	HOM; 12	25th	530
2020	Tyler Reddick	8	Chevy	DAY; 28	LVS; 18	CAL; 11	PHO; 33	DAR; 7	DAR; 13	CLT; 8	CLT; 14	BRI; 36	ATL; 16	MAR; 16	HOM; 4	TAL; 20	POC; 30	POC; 35	IND; 8	KEN; 10	TEX; 2	KAN; 13	NHA; 10	MCH; 18	MCH; 24	DAY; 18	DOV; 13	DOV; 18	DAY; 29	DAR; 23	RCH; 11	BRI; 4	LVS; 38	TAL; 7	ROV; 12	KAN; 25	TEX; 15	MAR; 24	PHO; 19	19th	780
2021	Tyler Reddick	8	Chevy	DAY; 27	DAY; 38	HOM; 2	LVS; 22	PHO; 29	ATL; 26	BRD; 7	MAR; 8	RCH; 20	TAL; 7	KAN; 7	DAR; 12	DOV; 8	COA; 9	CLT; 9	SON; 19	NSS; 18	POC; 11	POC; 9	ROA; 8	ATL; 6	NHA; 13	GLN; 10	IRC; 21	MCH; 29	DAY; 5	DAR; 18	RCH; 15	BRI; 12	LVS; 6	TAL; 39	ROV; 2	TEX; 9	KAN; 22	MAR; 18	PHO; 19	13th	2250
2022	Tyler Reddick	8	Chevy	DAY; 35	CAL; 24*	LVS; 7	PHO; 3	ATL; 28	COA; 5	RCH; 12	MAR; 18	BRD; 2*	TAL; 39	DOV; 30	DAR; 2	KAN; 30	CLT; 6	GTW; 16	SON; 35	NSS; 18	ROA; 1	ATL; 29	NHA; 21	POC; 2	IRC; 1*	MCH; 29	RCH; 31	GLN; 7	DAY; 2	DAR; 3	KAN; 35	BRI; 25	TEX; 1*	TAL; 28	ROV; 8	LVS; 6	HOM; 35	MAR; 35	PHO; 23	14th	2215
2023	Kyle Busch	8	Chevy	DAY; 19	CAL; 1	LVS; 14	PHO; 8	ATL; 10	COA; 2	RCH; 14	BRD; 32	MAR; 21	TAL; 1	DOV; 21	KAN; 35	DAR; 7	CLT; 6	GTW; 1*	SON; 2	NSS; 9	CSC; 5	ATL; 5	NHA; 36	POC; 21	RCH; 3	MCH; 37	IRC; 36	GLN; 14	DAY; 7	DAR; 11	KAN; 7	BRI; 20	TEX; 34	TAL; 25	ROV; 3	LVS; 3	HOM; 18	MAR; 27	PHO; 25	14th	2232
2024	Kyle Busch	8	Chevy	DAY; 12	ATL; 3	LVS; 26	PHO; 22	BRI; 25	COA; 9	RCH; 20	MAR; 16	TEX; 9	TAL; 27	DOV; 4	KAN; 8	DAR; 27	CLT; 15	GTW; 35	SON; 12	IOW; 35	NHA; 35	NSS; 27	CSC; 9	POC; 32	IND; 25	RCH; 12	MCH; 4	DAY; 2	DAR; 2	ATL; 7	GLN; 30	BRI; 25	KAN; 19	TAL; 19	ROV; 13	LVS; 13	HOM; 32	MAR; 28	PHO; 21	20th	766
2025	Kyle Busch	8	Chevy	DAY; 34	ATL; 7	COA; 5*	PHO; 8	LVS; 33	HOM; 21	MAR; 18	DAR; 10	BRI; 14	TAL; 27	TEX; 20	KAN; 21	CLT; 15	NSS; 12	MCH; 8	MXC; 37	POC; 20	ATL; 21	CSC; 5	SON; 10	DOV; 11	IND; 25	IOW; 20	GLN; 22	RCH; 16	DAY; 33	DAR; 8	GTW; 22	BRI; 16	NHA; 30	KAN; 19	ROV; 34	LVS; 8	TAL; 19	MAR; 13	PHO; 5	21st	737
2026	Kyle Busch	8	Chevy	DAY; 15	ATL; 34	COA; 12	PHO; 17	LVS; 28	DAR; 21	MAR; 24	BRI; 25	KAN; 35	TAL; 10	TEX; 20	GLN; 8	CLT	NSS	MCH	POC	COR	SON	CHI	ATL	NWS	IND	IOW	RCH	NHA	DAY	DAR	GTW	BRI	KAN	LVS	CLT	PHO	TAL	MAR	HOM		

=== Car No. 27 history ===
Paul Menard (2011–2017)

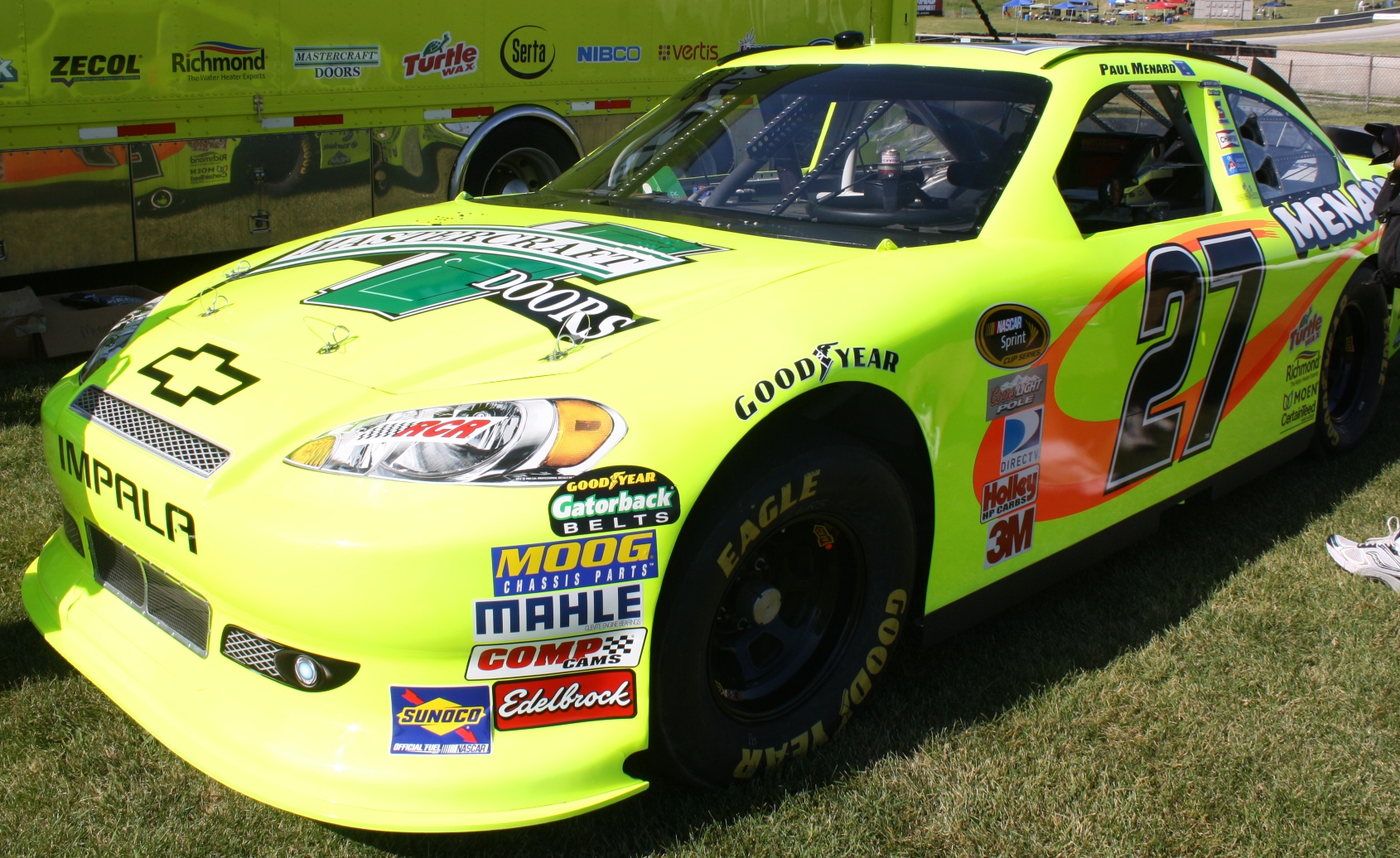
Paul Menard's No. 27 Menards Chevy with Mastercraft Door on the hood in 2012

On August 11, 2010, Paul Menard was signed to drive the fourth RCR car after he decided to leave the struggling Richard Petty Motorsports. The car number was revealed to be 27, and MENARDS Home Improvement, owned by Paul's father John Menard Jr., came on to sponsor the car in a multi-year agreement. Former TRG Motorsports partner Tom Pumpelly was listed as the owner of the No. 27 and the No. 35th place owner's points were given to Menard to guarantee a spot in the first five races. The 27 opened the season with a 9th-place finish at the Daytona 500. Menard would go on to win the Brickyard 400 at the Indianapolis on July 31, leading a total of 21 laps and using a fuel mileage gamble to take the victory. It was the first and only career win for Menard. The victory also made Paul eligible for the $3 million Sprint Summer Showdown. Menard spent most of the season flirting with the top 12 in points. Menard and the 27 team would end up finishing 17th in points.

In 2012 and 2013, Menard's results were similar, scoring 9 top 10s in both seasons and finishing 16th and 17th in points respectively, with only three DNF's over the two years. At the 2013 season finale at Homestead, Menard was involved in a freak incident, when his right rear wheel caught fire due to rubber from a previous tire issue being wrapped around the rear axle and igniting from a cut brake line. The tire proceed to explode on pit road, sending black smoke in all directions, and ending their day. ESPN analyst Andy Petree described it as "like a bomb went off" during the telecast of the race. In a less infamous incident at Darlington in April of the next year, Menard blew a right front tire and slammed the turn 2 wall. Once again on pit road, rubber collected under the car (in addition to fluid leaking from the engine) caught fire and exploded, ending the 27 car's race.

Menard returned to the 27 for 2014, with the car running schemes more oriented towards the associate sponsors of MENARDS featured on the hood of the car. Six races prior to the Chase for the Sprint Cup at Indy in July, Menard was involved in an incident with part-time driver Juan Pablo Montoya, sending Menard into the turn 3 wall and relegating him to a 34th-place finish. The incident upset both driver and crew (Menard was dropped to 16th in points). After the fall Richmond race, Menard remained winless and ranked 20th in points.

Menard made his first chase appearance in 2015, but got eliminated after the first round and finished 15th in the final standings. After two mediocre seasons, (25th in 2016, 23rd in 2017), Menard left the team to go race for Wood Brothers Racing for the 2018 season. The No. 27 team was shut down after the 2017 season, with the team's charter being leased and eventually sold to StarCom Racing.

==== Car No. 27 results ====
Year	Driver	No.	Make	1	2	3	4	5	6	7	8	9	10	11	12	13	14	15	16	17	18	19	20	21	22	23	24	25	26	27	28	29	30	31	32	33	34	35	36	Owners	Pts
2011	Paul Menard	27	Chevy	DAY; 9	PHO; 17	LVS; 12	BRI; 5	CAL; 16	MAR; 38	TEX; 5	TAL; 12	RCH; 37	DAR; 22	DOV; 24	CLT; 29	KAN; 19	POC; 14	MCH; 4	SON; 17	DAY; 8	KEN; 24	NHA; 24	IND; 1	POC; 10	GLN; 32	MCH; 26	BRI; 30	ATL; 18	RCH; 34	CHI; 20	NHA; 20	DOV; 16	KAN; 12	CLT; 17	TAL; 12	MAR; 24	TEX; 15	PHO; 9	HOM; 16	17th	947
2012	Paul Menard	27	Chevy	DAY; 6	PHO; 31	LVS; 7	BRI; 10	CAL; 19	MAR; 26	TEX; 18	KAN; 18	RCH; 13	TAL; 17	DAR; 13	CLT; 15	DOV; 17	POC; 9	MCH; 22	SON; 20	KEN; 12	DAY; 14	NHA; 17	IND; 14	POC; 11	GLN; 12	MCH; 9	BRI; 10	ATL; 8	RCH; 23	CHI; 15	NHA; 12	DOV; 22	TAL; 28	CLT; 27	KAN; 3	MAR; 12	TEX; 27	PHO; 9	HOM; 11	16th	1006
2013	Paul Menard	27	Chevy	DAY; 21	PHO; 20	LVS; 10	BRI; 9	CAL; 8	MAR; 19	TEX; 17	KAN; 10	RCH; 13	TAL; 26	DAR; 19	CLT; 13	DOV; 20	POC; 30	MCH; 14	SON; 14	KEN; 30	DAY; 43	NHA; 17	IND; 12	POC; 32	GLN; 17	MCH; 4	BRI; 6	ATL; 24	RCH; 5	CHI; 22	NHA; 22	DOV; 18	KAN; 7	CLT; 24	TAL; 4	MAR; 22	TEX; 15	PHO; 16	HOM; 39	17th	949
2014	Paul Menard	27	Chevy	DAY; 32	PHO; 23	LVS; 3	BRI; 21	CAL; 9	MAR; 10	TEX; 9	DAR; 41	RCH; 24	TAL; 6	KAN; 17	CLT; 8	DOV; 10	POC; 26	MCH; 4	SON; 5	KEN; 15	DAY; 16	NHA; 19	IND; 34	POC; 33	GLN; 32	MCH; 4	BRI; 9	ATL; 18	RCH; 18	CHI; 21	NHA; 15	DOV; 16	KAN; 9	CLT; 42	TAL; 36	MAR; 14	TEX; 17	PHO; 23	HOM; 4	21st	944
2015	Paul Menard	27	Chevy	DAY; 25	ATL; 13	LVS; 12	PHO; 14	CAL; 4	MAR; 23	TEX; 41	BRI; 11	RCH; 15	TAL; 3	KAN; 18	CLT; 14	DOV; 8	POC; 31	MCH; 8	SON; 13	DAY; 16	KEN; 15	NHA; 25	IND; 14	POC; 11	GLN; 13	MCH; 12	BRI; 24	DAR; 26	RCH; 26	CHI; 17	NHA; 15	DOV; 25	CLT; 36	KAN; 19	TAL; 6	MAR; 15	TEX; 13	PHO; 13	HOM; 21	14th	2262
2016	Paul Menard	27	Chevy	DAY; 18	ATL; 18	LVS; 15	PHO; 38	CAL; 15	MAR; 8	TEX; 26	BRI; 15	RCH; 22	TAL; 26	KAN; 40	DOV; 11	CLT; 17	POC; 33	MCH; 18	SON; 16	DAY; 36	KEN; 18	NHA; 18	IND; 10	POC; 35	GLN; 22	BRI; 32	MCH; 18	DAR; 16	RCH; 40	CHI; 21	NHA; 25	DOV; 22	CLT; 34	KAN; 20	TAL; 13	MAR; 25	TEX; 28	PHO; 10	HOM; 14	26th	678
2017	Paul Menard	27	Chevy	DAY; 5	ATL; 25	LVS; 19	PHO; 21	CAL; 28	MAR; 19	TEX; 36	BRI; 16	RCH; 25	TAL; 9	KAN; 35	CLT; 13	DOV; 33	POC; 20	MCH; 22	SON; 11	DAY; 3	KEN; 21	NHA; 22	IND; 16	POC; 19	GLN; 18	MCH; 34	BRI; 16	DAR; 16	RCH; 28	CHI; 14	NHA; 20	DOV; 26	CLT; 19	TAL; 12	KAN; 12	MAR; 20	TEX; 23	PHO; 15	HOM; 16	23rd	631

=== Car No. 30 history ===
Jeff Green & Steve Park (2001–2003)

In 2001, RCR fielded the No. 30 AOL-sponsored Chevrolet, with AOL signing a four-year contract. Childress initially planned to have Kevin Harvick drive the car on a limited basis during that season as part of a transition from the Busch Series to Winston Cup for 2002. After Dale Earnhardt's death, Harvick was moved into RCR's primary car and 2000 Busch Series champion Jeff Green was selected to drive the car in his place. Originally planning to debut at Atlanta in March, the team debuted at Fontana in April, with Green finishing 21st. The team qualified for six more races that season, with Green earning a pole at the Sharpie 500 at Bristol in August, and went full-time the next season as scheduled with Green behind the wheel.

Green posted six Top 10s in the 2002 season, including a career best second at Loudon in July, and finished seventeenth in points. Although the team started 2003 with a Daytona 500 pole, Green and the team failed to jell as Childress had hoped and on May 5, was fired following the first race at Richmond. In what amounted to a trade between organizations, Green was replaced by the former driver of the No. 1 car for Dale Earnhardt, Inc., Steve Park, with Green taking Park's ride at DEI. Green's firing was largely connected to an altercation between him and teammate Kevin Harvick during the Richmond race in which Harvick wrecked Green while racing for a top 10 position, igniting an already tumultuous relationship between the two drivers that went back to their competition in the Busch Series. Park would score a pole at Daytona in July and earn two Top 10s but had only six finishes inside the Top 20, ending the season 32nd in points.

Multiple Drivers (2004)

In 2004, Childress promoted 25-year-old Busch Series driver Johnny Sauter to the ride, hoping he would rise to the occasion like Harvick had in 2001. Kevin Hamlin moved over from the 31 team to serve as Sauter's crew chief. Sauter had helped secure the 2003 Busch Series owner's championship in a partial schedule with RCR, while finishing 8th in driver points. Sauter failed to score a top ten, ranked at the bottom of the Raybestos Rookie standings, and was released just 13 races into the season. After that, Dave Blaney drove the car, only skipping Sonoma when Jim Inglebright took the wheel. A couple of weeks after it was announced Blaney would be in the car for rest of the year, Jeff Burton became available after parting ways with Roush Racing's No. 99 car, leaving Blaney out in the cold. Burton was signed to a multi-year contract and drove the car for the rest of the year beginning at Michigan in August. When Robby Gordon left to start his own team, Burton moved to the 31.

==== Car No. 30 results ====
Year	Driver	No.	Make	1	2	3	4	5	6	7	8	9	10	11	12	13	14	15	16	17	18	19	20	21	22	23	24	25	26	27	28	29	30	31	32	33	34	35	36	Owners	Pts
2001	Jeff Green	30	Chevy	DAY	CAR	LVS	ATL	DAR	BRI	TEX	MAR	TAL	CAL; 21	RCH	CLT	DOV; DNQ	MCH; 17	POC	SON	DAY	CHI; 36	NHA	POC	IND; 21	GLN	MCH	BRI; 42	DAR	RCH; 40	DOV	KAN	CLT; DNQ	MAR	TAL	PHO	CAR	HOM	ATL; 34	NHA	48th	539
2002	Jeff Green	30	Chevy	DAY; 19	CAR; 17	LVS; 33	ATL; 41	DAR; 25	BRI; 27	TEX; 16	MAR; 22	TAL; 16	CAL; 11	RCH; 13	CLT; 20	DOV; 38	POC; 34	MCH; 18	SON; 5	DAY; 21	CHI; 12	NHA; 2	POC; 26	IND; 19	GLN; 12	MCH; 9	BRI; 35	DAR; 12	RCH; 3	NHA; 26	DOV; 13	KAN; 17	TAL; 5	CLT; 29	MAR; 32	ATL; 24	CAR; 10	PHO; 35	HOM; 38	17th	3704
2003	Jeff Green	30	Chevy	DAY; 39	CAR; 31	LVS; 27	ATL; 25	DAR; 19	BRI; 20	TEX; 7	TAL; 29	MAR; 26	CAL; 26	RCH; 40																										33rd	2856
2003	Steve Park	30	Chevy												CLT; 27	DOV; 32	POC; 35	MCH; 27	SON; 41	DAY; 39	CHI; 26	NHA; 8	POC; 25	IND; 15	GLN; 26	MCH; 5	BRI; 29	DAR; 20	RCH; 31	NHA; 34	DOV; 26	TAL; DNQ	KAN; 22	CLT; 36	MAR; 12	ATL; 36	PHO; 39	CAR; 34	HOM; 19	33rd	2856
2004	Johnny Sauter	30	Chevy	DAY; 26	CAR; 14	LVS; 24	ATL; 30	DAR; 26	BRI; 15	TEX; 24	MAR; 31	TAL; 14	CAL; 21	RCH; 19	CLT; 40	DOV; 20																								22nd	3704
2004	Dave Blaney	30	Chevy														POC; 29	MCH; 15		DAY; 15	CHI; 37	NHA; 33	POC; 27	IND; 21	GLN; 24															22nd	3704
2004	Jim Inglebright	30	Chevy																SON; 19																					22nd	3704
2004	Jeff Burton	30	Chevy																							MCH; 12	BRI; 4	CAL; 15	RCH; 23	NHA; 15	DOV; 33	TAL; 13	KAN; 15	CLT; 9	MAR; 11	ATL; 6	PHO; 11	DAR; 13	HOM; 36	22nd	3704

=== Car No. 31 history ===
Beginnings (1978, 1993)

For over a decade, car No. 31 was Childress's R&D car. It debuted in 1978 at Rockingham with Bobby Wawak as the driver, finishing 27th. The car wasn't seen again until 1993 with Earnhardt's longtime friend Neil Bonnett driving at Talladega. In this race, Bonnett, already on a comeback, was involved in a horrifying accident, but made it out okay. After driving another race in the season finale at Atlanta as a start and park entry that year for RCR, Bonnett died testing Phoenix Racing's No. 51 Country Time Lemonade car for the 1994 Daytona 500.

Mike Skinner (1996–2001)

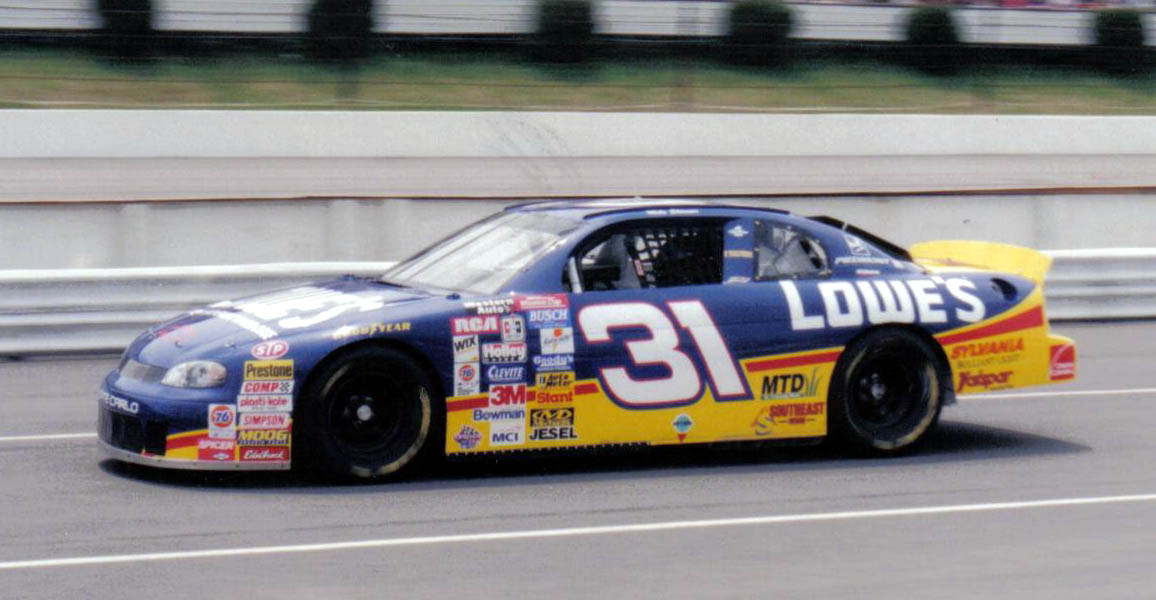
Mike Skinner, the first full-time driver of the No. 31, in 1997 with the Lowe's scheme he ran until 2001.

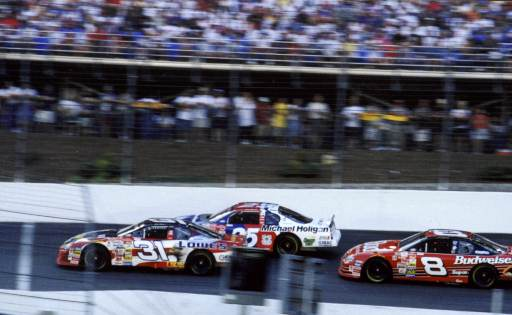
Mike Skinner races the No. 31 Chevrolet in the 2000 Coca-Cola 600.

In 1996, the car returned with defending Craftsman Truck Series champion Mike Skinner driving with Realtree sponsoring the car in four of the five races it ran. The team finally ran full-time in 1997, with Skinner driving and Lowe's signing a five-year deal to sponsor the entry. The move made RCR a multi-car operation for the first time. Skinner won the pole position for both of the races at Daytona, and defeated what has turned out to be a very scant field of drivers for Rookie of the Year. He suffered some injuries in 1998, and Morgan Shepherd and Childress' son-in-law Mike Dillon filled in for him. Teamed with crew chief Larry McReynolds, 1999 was his best season ever, winning the pole position twice, and finished tenth in points after being the championship leader at one point earlier in the year. Skinner would finish 12th in points in 2000, earning his career-best finish of second at Talladega. However, Skinner was never able to win a points-paying race, although he won two exhibition races in Japan, at Suzuka and Twin Ring Motegi, respectively, as well as some other non-point events.

Robby Gordon (2001–2004)

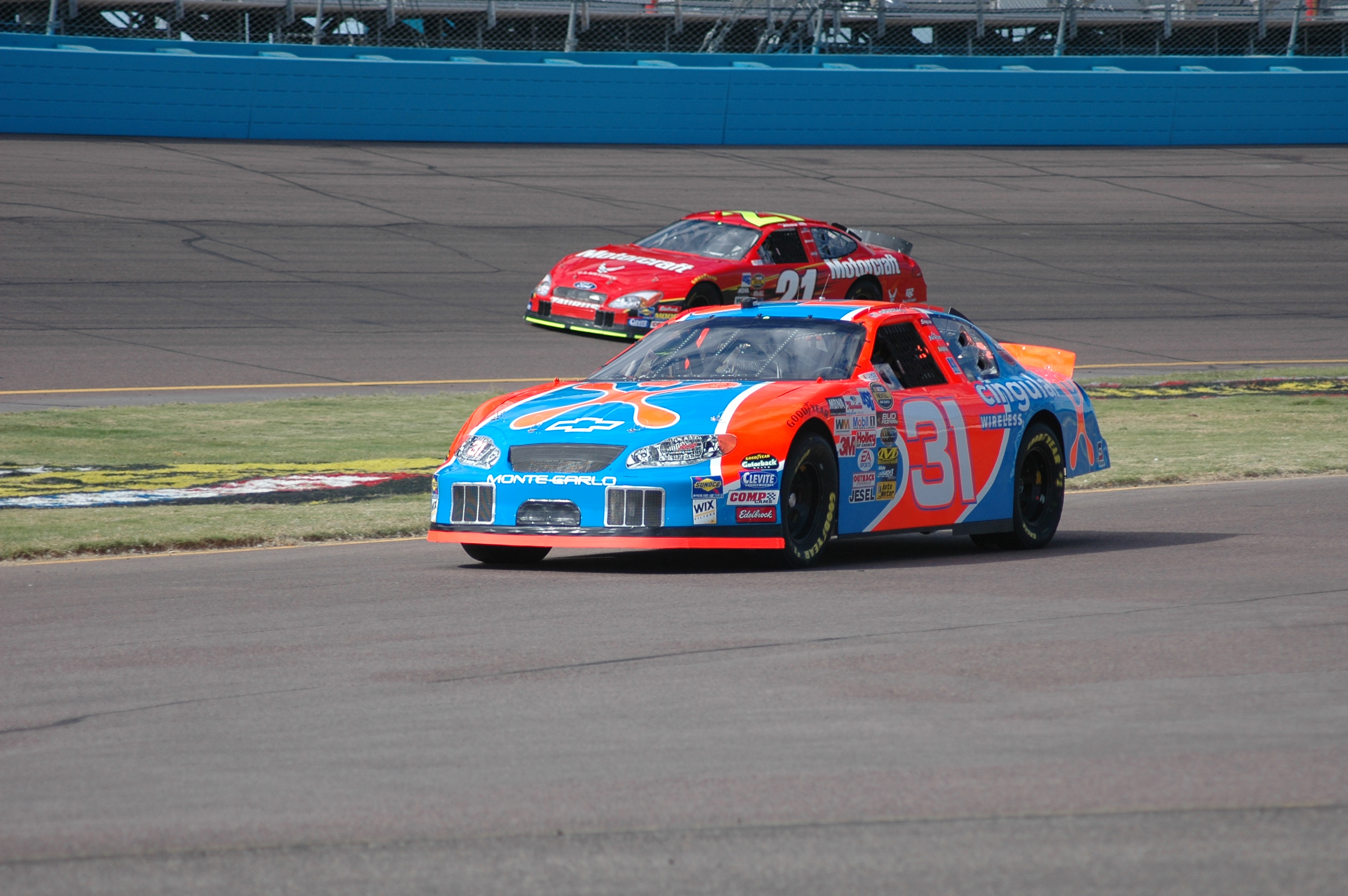
Robby Gordon in the No. 31 Cingular Chevy at Phoenix Raceway in 2004. All three of Robby Gordon's Cup wins came in the No. 31.

For the 2001 season, McReynolds was replaced by Royce McGee. In 2001, Skinner suffered a concussion and a broken ankle in an early race crash at the inaugural race at Chicagoland in July. Robby Gordon was named his replacement in the No. 31 car. Gordon struggled heavily, missing two races and failing to post a finish better than 25th in his first four starts for the team. During this time in August, Cingular Wireless (then the sponsor of Chip Ganassi Racing's No. 01 car) was announced as the new sponsor for 2002 signing a four-year deal, with Lowe's not renewing their contract and moving to Hendrick Motorsports. Skinner returned at Bristol, but he just wasn't the same. Skinner was released from the final year of his contract in August, and left the team after Dover in September to have season-ending surgery. Gordon once again took his place at Kansas.

At Watkins Glen, Gordon was dominating the race when the telemetry box in his car used by NBC Sports burst into flames, injuring a crew member and ending the No. 31's day. In spite of struggles, it was announced in November 2001 that Gordon would drive the car full-time the next year. Robby Gordon continued driving the car for the final races of 2001, DNQing twice (at Charlotte and Atlanta), and missing one race that Jeff Green drove in his place. In the rescheduled season finale at New Hampshire, Robby Gordon was engaged in a closing-laps battle with eventual champion Jeff Gordon. With 16 laps to go, leader Gordon was stuck behind the 12th-place No. 77 car of Robert Pressley trying to stay on the lead lap, with Robby right on his tail. In the middle of turns three and four, Robby gave a bump to Jeff Gordon while he had slowed down to try to pass the lapped car of Mike Wallace, sending him into Wallace's No. 12 car and inflicting damage on the 24 car. Jeff was black-flagged while attempting to retaliate under caution, and Robby went on to earn a controversial first career victory. It was also the 31 car's first victory.

Armed with a big surge of momentum and a new sponsor in Cingular Wireless, Gordon had five top-ten finishes and finished 20th in points in 2002. 2003 was even better, as he swept both road course events and finished 16th in points. After his performance dipped down in 2004, Gordon decided to leave and start his own team, the No. 7 with Robby Gordon Motorsports, and Jeff Burton was tabbed as his replacement.

Jeff Burton (2005–2013)

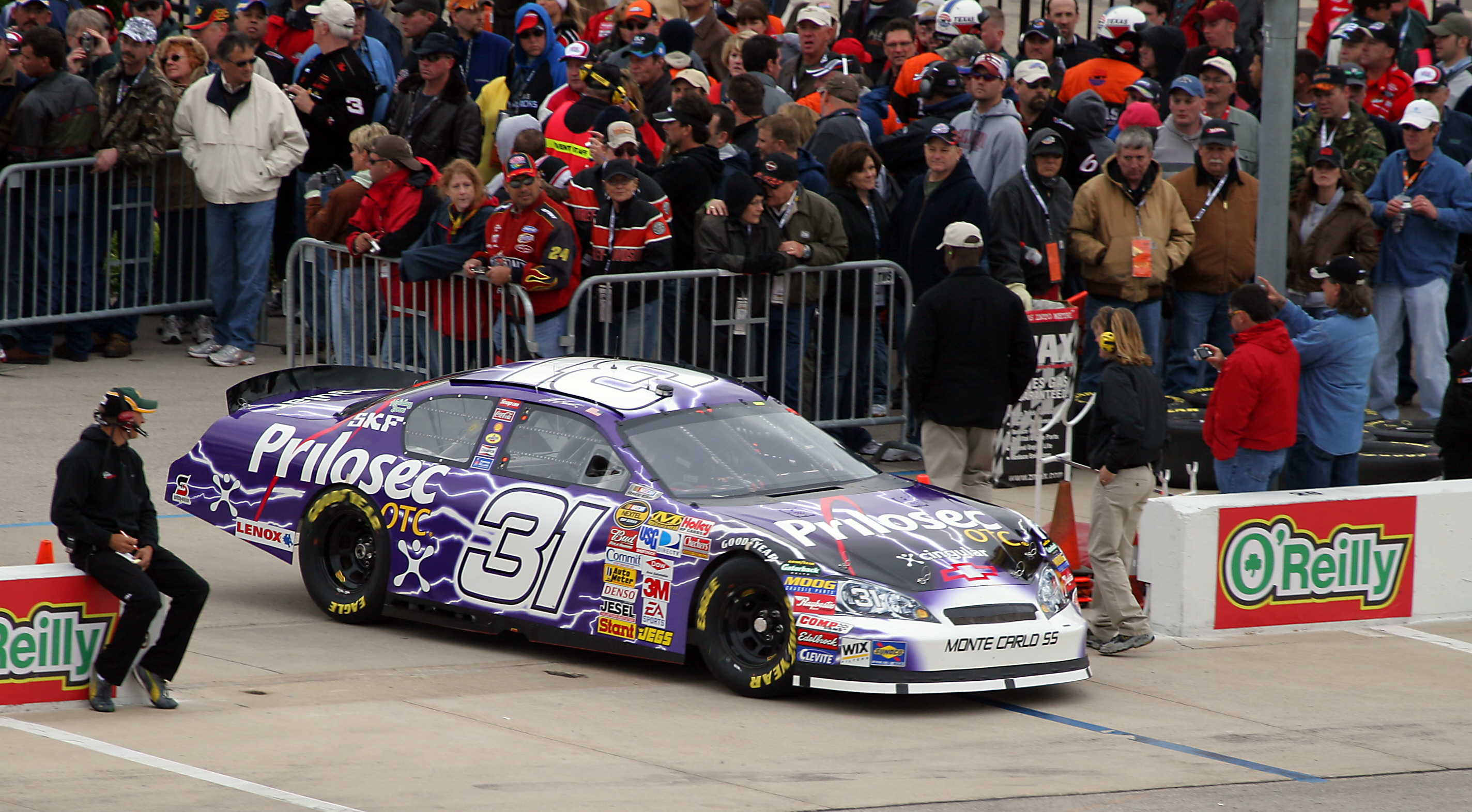
Burton in the pits during his 2007 win at Texas

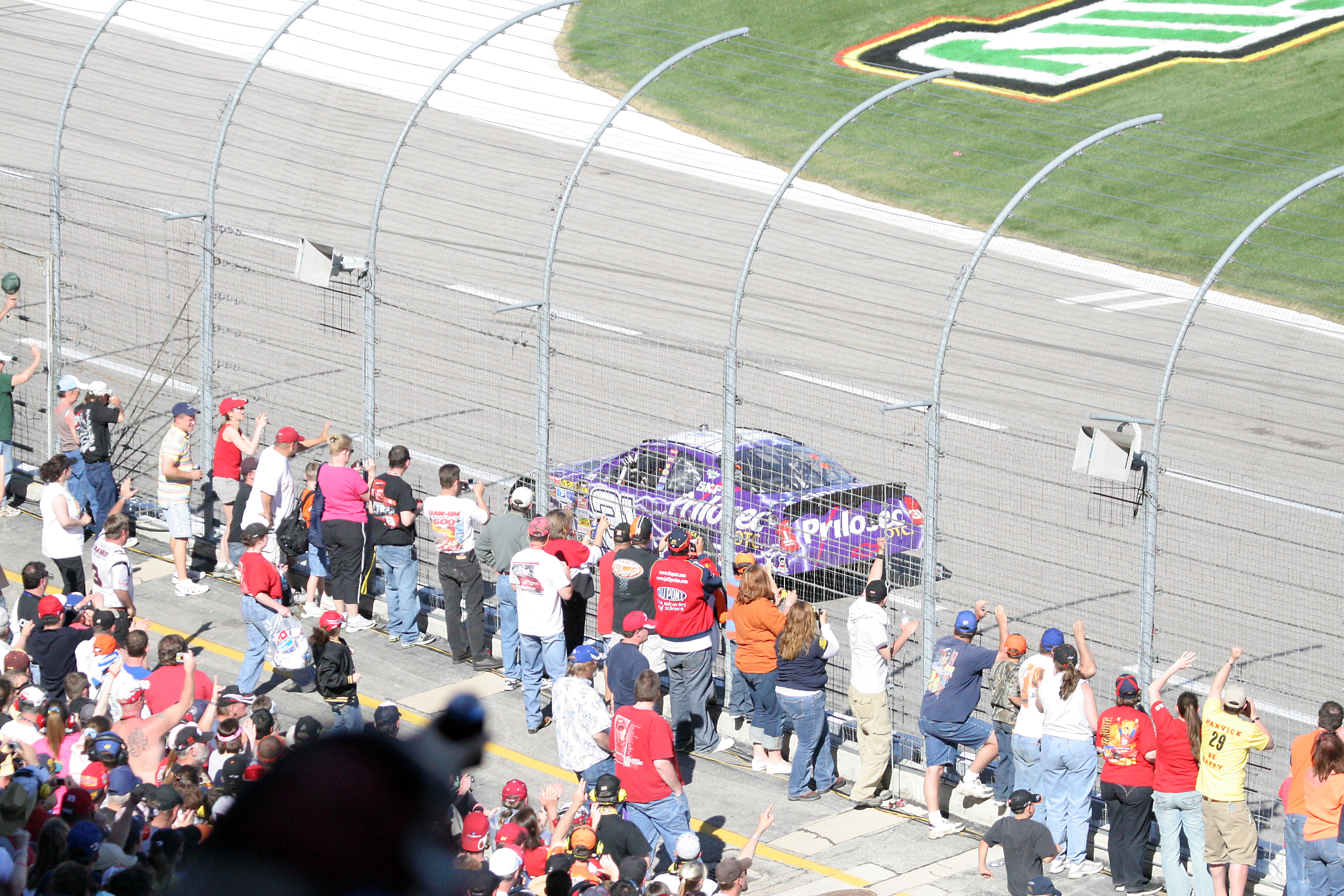
Burton celebrates after winning at Texas in 2007

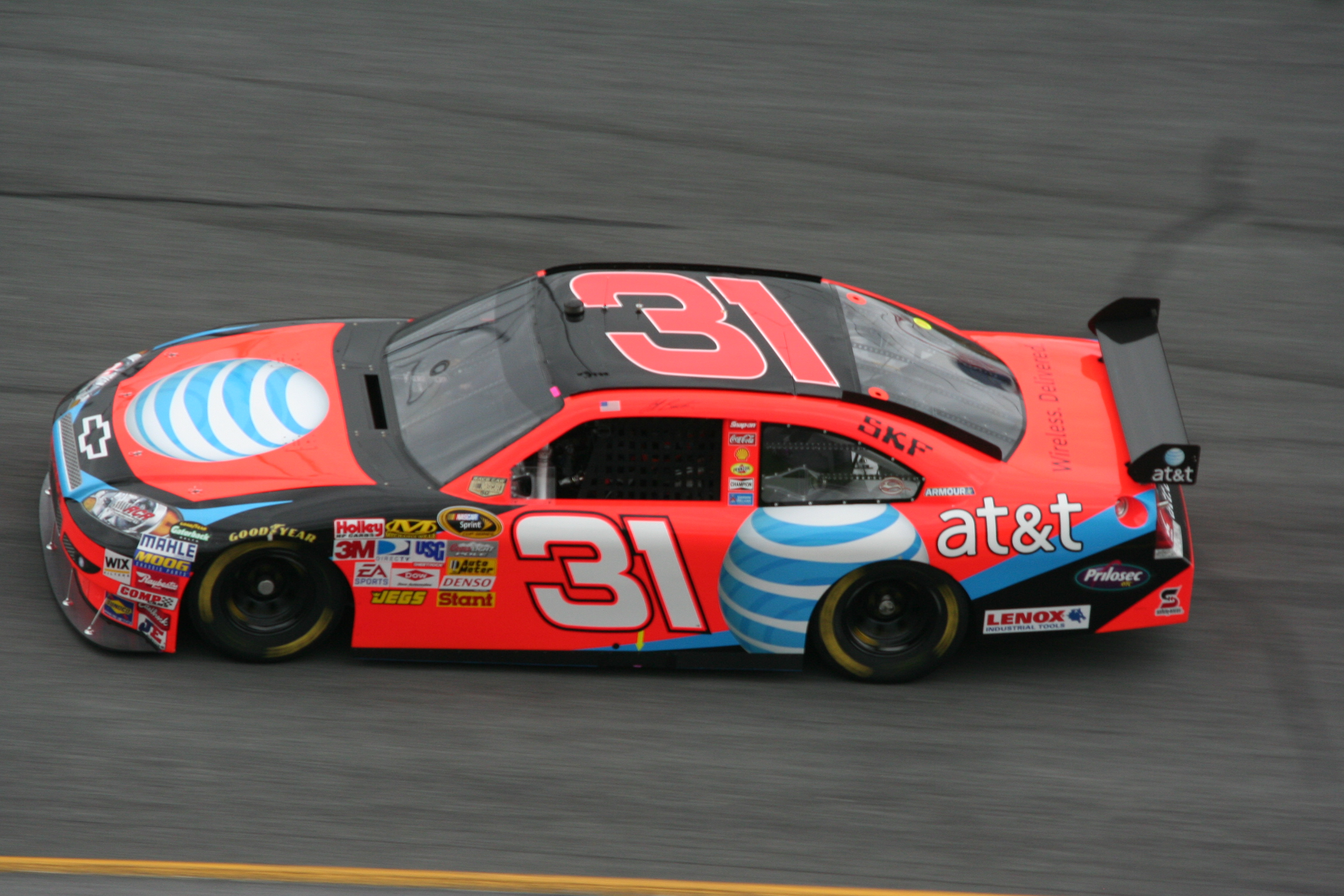
2008 Cup car at Daytona

2005 was Jeff Burton's first full year at RCR, and he had six top-tens and three top-fives for the year, including a third in the Subway Fresh 500 at Phoenix in April and a second-place finish in the Sharpie 500 at Bristol.

In 2006, Burton won the pole for four races, bringing his total number of career pole wins to six. The four pole wins were for the Daytona 500, the USG Sheetrock 400 at Chicagoland, the Brickyard 400 at Indianapolis, and the GFS Marketplace 400 at Michigan. Prior to qualifying for the Daytona 500, Burton was extremely enthusiastic about the improvements to RCR as a whole. The Allstate 400 pole gave Richard Childress Racing the front row as teammate Clint Bowyer recorded the second fastest time. Burton's best finish came in the Chicagoland race where he recorded a second-place finish. He led the most laps at Indianapolis and Bristol's Sharpie 500, setting the pace for more than half the race. In the Busch Series, he won at Atlanta and Dover, breaking his four-year winless streak in any series. Burton won Dover allowing him to take the points lead. However, a series of relatively poor finishes in subsequent races, including a flat tire at Talladega while running in the top five and an engine failure at Martinsville, eliminated Burton from contention for the championship.

Burton won the Samsung 500 (Texas) on April 15, 2007, driving the Prilosec OTC-sponsored Chevrolet, passing Matt Kenseth on the final lap, making him the first driver with multiple wins at Texas. He finished tied for 7th in the 2007 standings and finished the year in 8th.

Burton came very close to winning the 50th running of the Daytona 500. He qualified 36th and by the end of the race had worked his way up in the field. He led prior to the race's final caution, but when the green flag dropped with four laps to go, lost several positions and wound up finishing 13th.

Burton won the 2008 Food City 500 at Bristol. Following contact between Kevin Harvick and Tony Stewart, Burton passed both Harvick and Stewart for the 2nd position. On the ensuing restart Burton passed Denny Hamlin coming off of Turn 2 to win the Food City 500 and finishing off a sweep of the podium for Richard Childress Racing. Burton also won the 2008 Bank of America 500 at Charlotte. Burton took the lead from Greg Biffle with just over 70 laps to go. During the final round of pit stops Burton took fuel only and held off a hard charging Jimmie Johnson for his first multiple win season since 2001. Burton improved to sixth in points

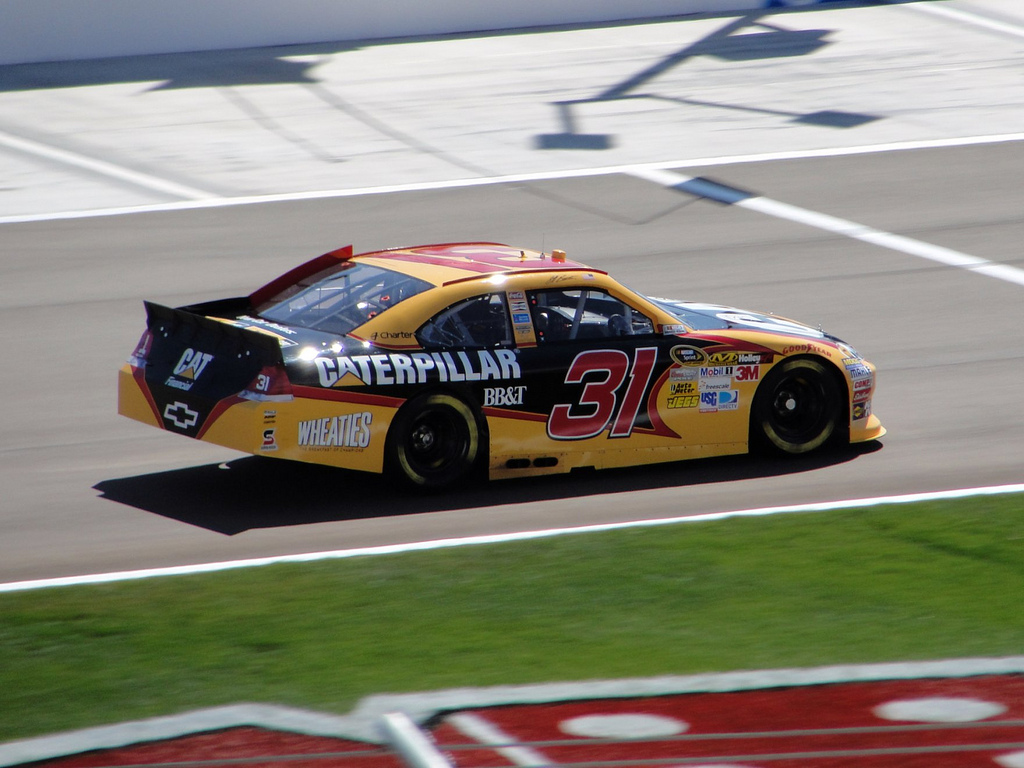
Burton in the No. 31 at Las Vegas in 2012. Burton's final four wins came with RCR

Burton had a new sponsor on the No. 31 beginning in 2009, after Caterpillar Inc., his brother Ward Burton's former sponsor at Bill Davis Racing, was signed through 2011. Burton was expected to make a run for the championship. Burton's best finish that year was a pair of second-place finishes in the final two races at Phoenix and Homestead.

In 2010, he rebounded but he had still not won a race, he finished second in both Dover races. He nearly won the fall Martinsville but a flat tire with 15 laps to go gave Denny Hamlin the win. A couple weeks later he and Jeff Gordon got into a wreck long after the caution was out. Burton walked up the track to confront Gordon and the two got into a shoving match. Burton finished 12th in the final standings. Afterwards, Burton assumed responsibility for the incident, stating he was attempting to catch up to Gordon, but was unable to see in the sunlight's glare.

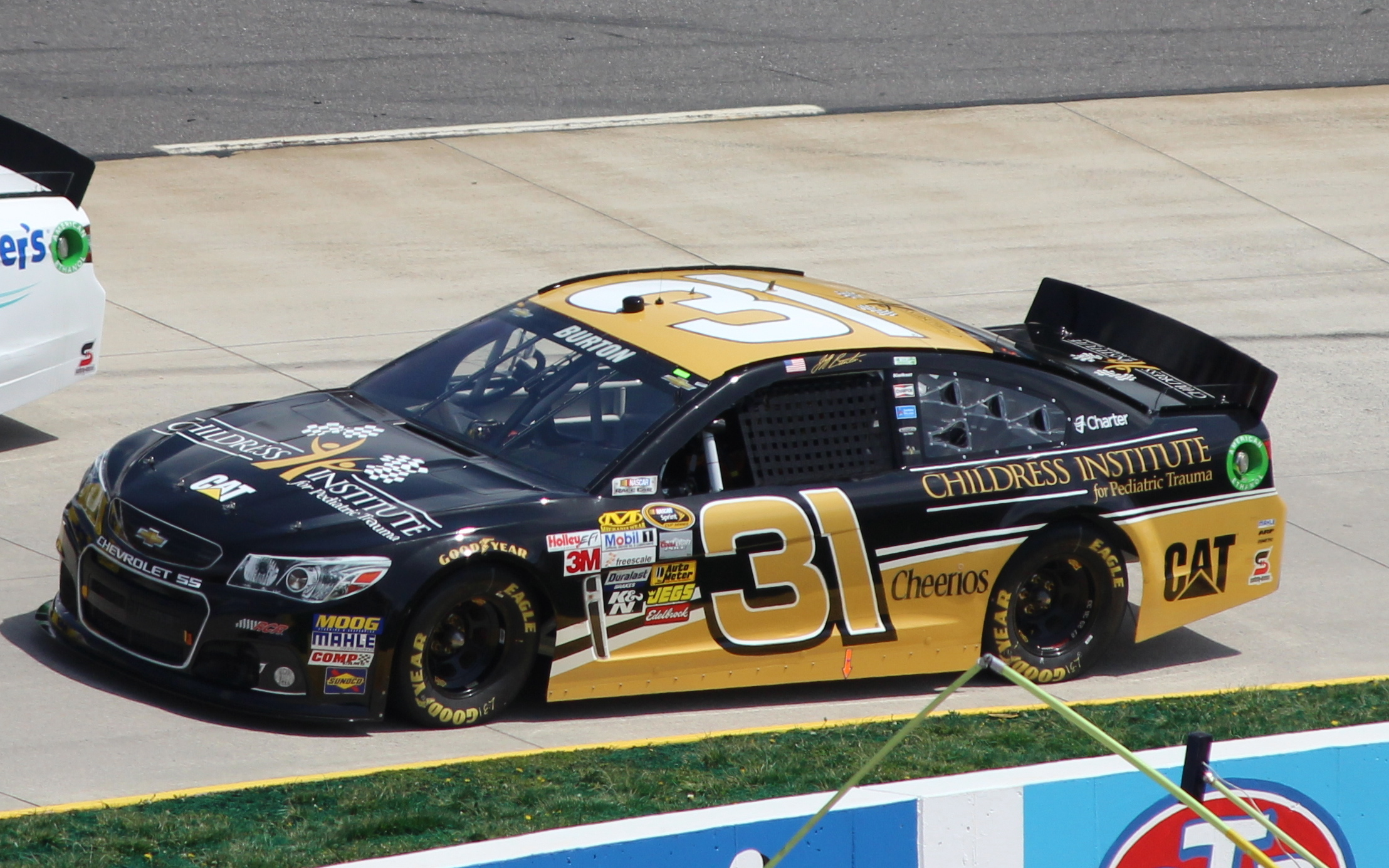
Burton during the 2013 STP Gas Booster 500

In 2011, Burton opened the season by winning the second Gatorade Duel qualifying race, edging out his Richard Childress Racing teammate Clint Bowyer. After that, Burton's season went downhill. He was leading the Daytona 500 halfway when his engine gave out. He nearly won the Coca-Cola 600 but got spun out on the final restart. Though wanting another caution, the yellow flag never came out because NASCAR wanted to see the race finish under green, and Dale Earnhardt Jr. was leading when the accident occurred. His teammate Kevin Harvick passed Earnhardt Jr. within the last 500 yards of the race, because Dale Jr. ran out of gas. This led to controversy because fans were speculating that NASCAR wanted Earnhardt to win and go back to victory lane in the first time in three years. Burton's first top 10 came in the twenty first race at Watkins Glen International. Burton had a strong run at the fall race at Talladega, leading on the last lap and out of turn four being pushed by Clint Bowyer. At the tri-oval, Bowyer slingshotted to Burton's outside and won by a hood, giving Richard Childress his 100th win as a team owner, Bowyer redeeming his 0.002 second loss to Jimmie Johnson at the track in the spring. In 2012, Burton gained the sponsorship in Wheaties, BB&T and EnerSys. The 31 team also switched crew chiefs too, and Drew Blickensderfer became the crew chief. After a dismal 2012, Blickensderfer was released 4 races early and Luke Lambert became Burton's crew chief in 2013. Shane Wilson became interim crew chief until the end of 2012. Burton had six Top 10s in 2012 including a dramatic 2nd-place finish at Daytona in July after saving his car from spinning on the final lap. At the AdvoCare 500 at Phoenix, Burton would make his 1,000th career NASCAR start, the sixth driver in NASCAR history to do so.

On September 4, 2013, Richard Childress Racing announced that Burton would not be returning to RCR in 2014.

Ryan Newman (2014–2018)

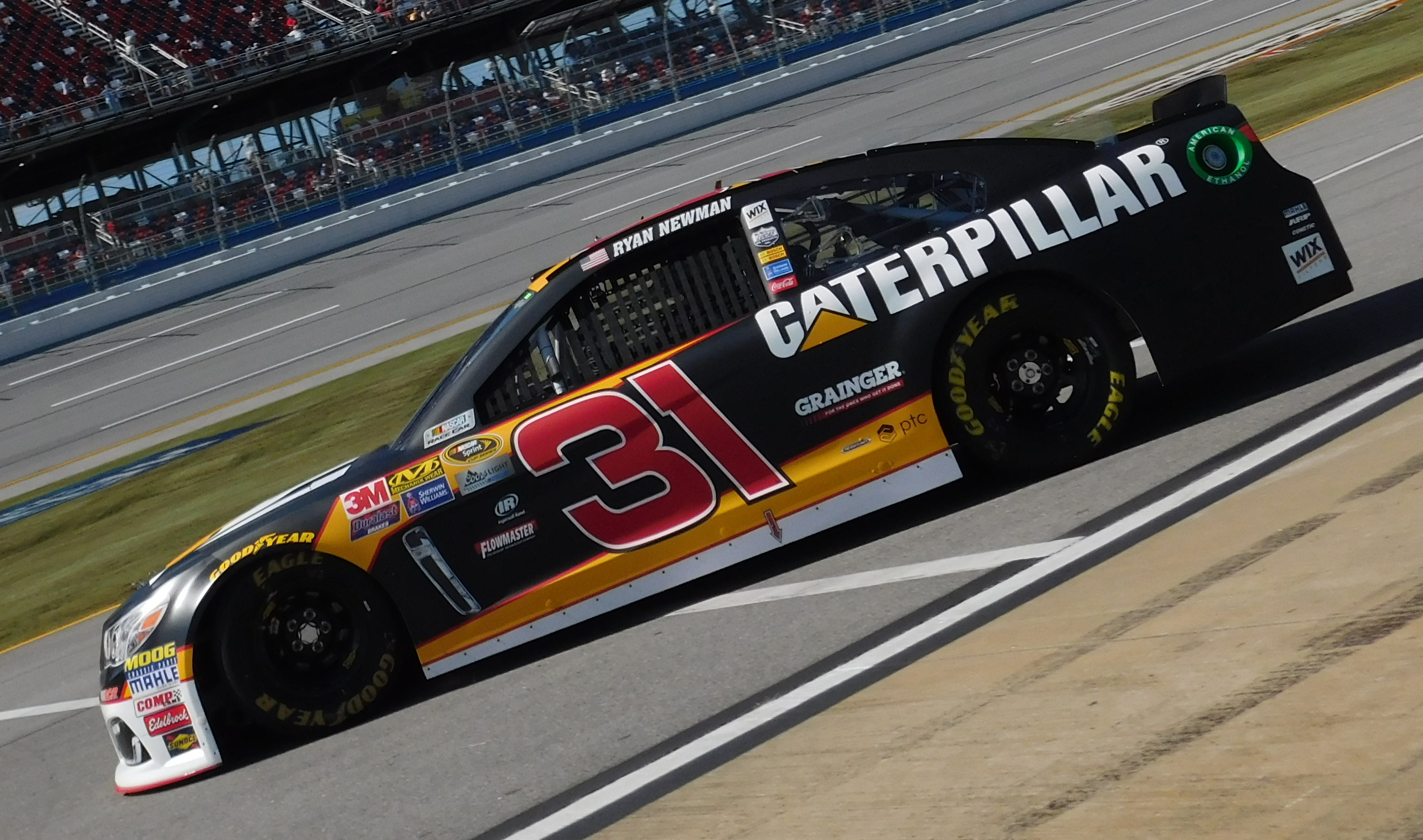
Ryan Newman in the No. 31 at Talladega in 2016

In September 2013, Burton announced that he would be stepping out of the No. 31 at the end of the season due to a lack of additional sponsorship. On September 9, it was announced that Ryan Newman will drive the No. 31 beginning in 2014, bringing sponsor Quicken Loans with him from Stewart–Haas Racing for 12 races. Kevin Harvick had transferred to Stewart–Haas Racing, Newman's previous team, essentially meaning the two drivers were switching teams, although they did not end up in the same rides.

In 2015, Newman had a productive season. He picked up a few top fives in the spring, but his season changed. After the 2015 Auto Club 400, Newman's team was penalized with one of the harshest penalties ever. Key members of his team including Lambert were suspended for six races and fined $75,000 and stripped of 75 driver and owner points for having intentionally altered their tires. Newman appealed the penalty which got slightly reduced on appeal but the suspensions were upheld.

Newman struggled throughout the 2016 season, only managing 10 top tens and 2 top fives. He finished off the season with a poor 25th-place finish at Homestead. Newman finished 11th in the 2016 Daytona 500. This was an improvement from 2015's finish which was a 38th-place finish.

In 2017, RCR re-signed Newman to a multi-year contract. On March 19, 2017, Newman won at Phoenix, breaking a four-year winless streak for himself and a nine-year winless streak for the No. 31 team. The team, however, struggled throughout the 2018 season, failing to make the Playoffs and finishing 17th in the points standings. On September 15, 2018, Newman announced he will not return to RCR in 2019.

Tyler Reddick (2019)

In September 2018, RCR announced that newcomer Daniel Hemric will race full-time in the No. 31, replacing Newman beginning in 2019 while competing for 2019 Rookie of the Year honors. On December 14, 2018, it was announced that the No. 31 car would be changing to No. 8 starting with the 2019 season. In February 2019, RCR announced that the No. 31 would enter in the Daytona 500 with the car being driven by rookie Tyler Reddick.

==== Car No. 31 results ====
Year	Driver	No.	Make	1	2	3	4	5	6	7	8	9	10	11	12	13	14	15	16	17	18	19	20	21	22	23	24	25	26	27	28	29	30	31	32	33	34	35	36	Owners	Pts
1978	Bobby Wawak	31	Chevy	RSD	DAY	RCH	CAR	ATL	BRI	DAR	NWS	MAR	TAL	DOV	CLT	NSV	RSD	MCH	DAY	NSV	POC	TAL	MCH	BRI	DAR	RCH	DOV	MAR	NWS	CLT	CAR; 27	ATL	ONT								
1993	Neil Bonnett	31	Chevy	DAY	CAR	RCH	ATL	DAR	BRI	NWS	MAR	TAL	SON	CLT	DOV	POC	MCH	DAY	NHA	POC	TAL; 34	GLN	MCH	BRI	DAR	RCH	DOV	MAR	NWS	CLT	CAR	PHO	ATL; 42							55th	98
1996	Mike Skinner	31	Chevy	DAY	CAR; 12	RCH	ATL	DAR	BRI; 36	NWS	MAR	TAL; 17	SON	CLT	DOV	POC	MCH	DAY	NHA	POC	TAL	IND	GLN	MCH	BRI	DAR	RCH	DOV; 19	MAR	NWS	CLT	CAR	PHO; 13	ATL						47th	529
1997	Mike Skinner	31	Chevy	DAY; 12	CAR; 25	RCH; 26	ATL; 21	DAR; 30	TEX; 22	BRI; 35	MAR; 32	SON; 16	TAL; 16	CLT; 34	DOV; 9	POC; 41	MCH; 42	CAL; 33	DAY; 41	NHA; 21	POC; 6	IND; 9	GLN; 19	MCH; 30	BRI; 34	DAR; 36	RCH; 29	NHA; 35	DOV; 19	MAR; 31	CLT; DNQ	TAL; 33	CAR; 23	PHO; 28	ATL; 23					30th	2669
1998	Mike Skinner	31	Chevy	DAY; 8	CAR; 32	LVS; 29	ATL; 42	DAR; 28	BRI; 32	TEX; 33				CLT; 29	DOV; 27	RCH; 30	MCH; 29	POC; 29	SON; 17	NHA; 5	POC; 30	IND; 4	GLN; 3	MCH; 19	BRI; 7	NHA; 15	DAR; 26	RCH; 8	DOV; 32	MAR; 16	CLT; 21	TAL; 7*	DAY; 3	PHO; 16	CAR; 21	ATL; 9				20th	3373
1998	Morgan Shepherd	31	Chevy								MAR; 11	TAL; 35																												20th	3373
1998	Mike Dillon	31	Chevy										CAL; 35																											20th	3373
1999	Mike Skinner	31	Chevy	DAY; 4	CAR; 6	LVS; 4	ATL; 6	DAR; 32	TEX; 42	BRI; 21	MAR; 4	TAL; 36	CAL; 10	RCH; 30	CLT; 9	DOV; 19	MCH; 18	POC; 22	SON; 17	DAY; 4	NHA; 23	POC; 10*	IND; 12	GLN; 9	MCH; 36	BRI; 23	DAR; 36	RCH; 11	NHA; 27	DOV; 21	MAR; 6*	CLT; 3	TAL; 13	CAR; 17	PHO; 20	HOM; 6	ATL; 8			10th	4003
2000	Mike Skinner	31	Chevy	DAY; 16	CAR; 21	LVS; 27	ATL; 30*	DAR; 14	BRI; 13	TEX; 12	MAR; 19	TAL; 2	CAL; 7	RCH; 33	CLT; 7	DOV; 9	MCH; 20	POC; 9	SON; 20	DAY; 9	NHA; 39	POC; 7	IND; 9	GLN; 36	MCH; 16	BRI; 14	DAR; 43	RCH; 30	NHA; 24	DOV; 11	MAR; 8	CLT; 20	TAL; 6	CAR; 14	PHO; 11	HOM; 23	ATL; 6			12th	3898
2001	Mike Skinner	31	Chevy	DAY; 26	CAR; 24	LVS; 18	ATL; 9	DAR; 37	BRI; 18	TEX; 30	MAR; 32	TAL; 29	CAL; 32	RCH; 24	CLT; 11	DOV; 11	MCH; 20	POC; 12	SON; 34	DAY; 41	CHI; 42					MCH; 18	BRI; 34	DAR; 24	RCH; 33	DOV; 20										26th	3235
2001	Robby Gordon	31	Chevy																			NHA; 25	POC; 28	IND; 30	GLN; 40						KAN; 14	CLT; DNQ	MAR; 38	TAL; 19	PHO; 7	CAR; 37		ATL; DNQ	NHA; 1	26th	3235
2001	Jeff Green	31	Chevy																																		HOM; 9			26th	3235
2002	Robby Gordon	31	Chevy	DAY; 13	CAR; 24	LVS; 37	ATL; 18	DAR; 24	BRI; 20	TEX; 41	MAR; 34	TAL; 33	CAL; 12	RCH; 37	CLT; 16	DOV; 8	POC; 19	MCH; 33	SON; 11	DAY; 29	CHI; 8	NHA; 7	POC; 25	IND; 8	GLN; 3	MCH; 21	BRI; 20	DAR; 17	RCH; 28	NHA; 17	DOV; 17	KAN; 13	TAL; 12	CLT; 38	MAR; 23	ATL; 20	CAR; 11	PHO; 27	HOM; 26	20th	3632
2003	Robby Gordon	31	Chevy	DAY; 6	CAR; 29	LVS; 23	ATL; 17	DAR; 28	BRI; 17	TEX; 18	TAL; 10	MAR; 21	CAL; 27	RCH; 4	CLT; 17	DOV; 9	POC; 28	MCH; 22	SON; 1*	DAY; 40	CHI; 7	NHA; 5	POC; 18	IND; 6	GLN; 1*	MCH; 6	BRI; 35	DAR; 28	RCH; 29	NHA; 21	DOV; 23	TAL; 12	KAN; 25	CLT; 38	MAR; 36	ATL; 21	PHO; 32	CAR; 20	HOM; 30	16th	3856
2004	Robby Gordon	31	Chevy	DAY; 35	CAR; 36	LVS; 30	ATL; 17	DAR; 4	BRI; 19	TEX; 23	MAR; 30	TAL; 5	CAL; 12	RCH; 24	CLT; 20	DOV; 14	POC; 8	MCH; 33	SON; 24	DAY; 19	CHI; 17	NHA; 25	POC; 7	IND; 25	GLN; 16	MCH; 25	BRI; 12	CAL; 9	RCH; 32	NHA; 32	DOV; 23	TAL; 9	KAN; 28	CLT; 18	MAR; 23	ATL; 16	PHO; 35	DAR; 15	HOM; 29	23rd	3646
2005	Jeff Burton	31	Chevy	DAY; 29	CAL; 19	LVS; 17	ATL; 15	BRI; 36	MAR; 16	TEX; 12	PHO; 3	TAL; 10	DAR; 21	RCH; 16	CLT; 22	DOV; 12	POC; 19	MCH; 11	SON; 30	DAY; 11	CHI; 30	NHA; 14	POC; 37	IND; 20	GLN; 43	MCH; 26	BRI; 2	CAL; 35	RCH; 18	NHA; 9	DOV; 11	TAL; 35	KAN; 28	CLT; 14	MAR; 5	ATL; 8	TEX; 30	PHO; 15	HOM; 25	18th	3803
2006	Jeff Burton	31	Chevy	DAY; 32	CAL; 5	LVS; 7	ATL; 35	BRI; 34	MAR; 33	TEX; 6	PHO; 9	TAL; 4	RCH; 15	DAR; 9	CLT; 6	DOV; 4	POC; 9	MCH; 11	SON; 7	DAY; 15	CHI; 2	NHA; 7	POC; 9	IND; 15*	GLN; 11	MCH; 42	BRI; 9*	CAL; 16	RCH; 9	NHA; 7	DOV; 1	KAN; 5	TAL; 27	CLT; 3	MAR; 42	ATL; 13	TEX; 38	PHO; 10	HOM; 14	7th	6228
2007	Jeff Burton	31	Chevy	DAY; 3	CAL; 4	LVS; 15	ATL; 4	BRI; 2	MAR; 6	TEX; 1	PHO; 13	TAL; 34	RCH; 43	DAR; 10	CLT; 24	DOV; 12	POC; 13	MCH; 24	SON; 3	NHA; 7	DAY; 16	CHI; 7	IND; 8	POC; 11	GLN; 40	MCH; 14	BRI; 12	CAL; 4	RCH; 18	NHA; 18	DOV; 7	KAN; 36	TAL; 43	CLT; 4	MAR; 12	ATL; 5	TEX; 6	PHO; 9	HOM; 8	8th	6231
2008	Jeff Burton	31	Chevy	DAY; 13	CAL; 12	LVS; 5	ATL; 10	BRI; 1	MAR; 3	TEX; 6	PHO; 6	TAL; 12	RCH; 11	DAR; 10	CLT; 6	DOV; 8	POC; 5	MCH; 15	SON; 13	NHA; 12	DAY; 37	CHI; 19	IND; 9	POC; 21	GLN; 17	MCH; 11	BRI; 42	CAL; 17	RCH; 6	NHA; 4	DOV; 9	KAN; 7	TAL; 4	CLT; 1	MAR; 17	ATL; 18	TEX; 13	PHO; 9	HOM; 40	6th	6335
2009	Jeff Burton	31	Chevy	DAY; 28	CAL; 32	LVS; 3	ATL; 14	BRI; 8	MAR; 15	TEX; 9	PHO; 15	TAL; 10	RCH; 3	DAR; 12	CLT; 25	DOV; 16	POC; 9	MCH; 26	SON; 34	NHA; 31	DAY; 16	CHI; 37	IND; 25	POC; 21	GLN; 38	MCH; 18	BRI; 34	ATL; 18	RCH; 16	NHA; 16	DOV; 16	KAN; 23	CAL; 30	CLT; 14	MAR; 15	TAL; 5	TEX; 9	PHO; 2	HOM; 2	17th	4022
2010	Jeff Burton	31	Chevy	DAY; 11	CAL; 3	LVS; 11	ATL; 20	BRI; 10	MAR; 20	PHO; 25	TEX; 12	TAL; 32*	RCH; 4	DAR; 8	DOV; 2	CLT; 25	POC; 7	MCH; 8	SON; 27	NHA; 12	DAY; 5	CHI; 7	IND; 8	POC; 8	GLN; 9	MCH; 24	BRI; 16	ATL; 4	RCH; 13	NHA; 15	DOV; 2	KAN; 18	CAL; 23	CLT; 20	MAR; 9*	TAL; 41	TEX; 36	PHO; 19	HOM; 31	12th	6033
2011	Jeff Burton	31	Chevy	DAY; 36	PHO; 26	LVS; 21	BRI; 20	CAL; 15	MAR; 24	TEX; 11	TAL; 16	RCH; 16	DAR; 33	DOV; 11	CLT; 21	KAN; 25	POC; 20	MCH; 24	SON; 21	DAY; 21	KEN; 19	NHA; 16	IND; 35	POC; 17	GLN; 9	MCH; 17	BRI; 15	ATL; 13	RCH; 29	CHI; 15	NHA; 13	DOV; 11	KAN; 21	CLT; 18	TAL; 2	MAR; 6	TEX; 27	PHO; 4	HOM; 10	20th	935
2012	Jeff Burton	31	Chevy	DAY; 5	PHO; 33	LVS; 14	BRI; 6	CAL; 22	MAR; 22	TEX; 29	KAN; 22	RCH; 31	TAL; 10	DAR; 18	CLT; 19	DOV; 22	POC; 15	MCH; 21	SON; 11	KEN; 24	DAY; 2	NHA; 21	IND; 32	POC; 22	GLN; 30	MCH; 19	BRI; 33	ATL; 12	RCH; 6	CHI; 24	NHA; 15	DOV; 27	TAL; 10	CLT; 28	KAN; 28	MAR; 22	TEX; 19	PHO; 13	HOM; 19	19th	883
2013	Jeff Burton	31	Chevy	DAY; 30	PHO; 10	LVS; 26	BRI; 32	CAL; 17	MAR; 18	TEX; 23	KAN; 18	RCH; 5	TAL; 28	DAR; 21	CLT; 12	DOV; 11	POC; 11	MCH; 10	SON; 31	KEN; 19	DAY; 16	NHA; 3	IND; 43	POC; 36	GLN; 26	MCH; 8	BRI; 13	ATL; 34	RCH; 18	CHI; 14	NHA; 8	DOV; 14	KAN; 12	CLT; 21	TAL; 21	MAR; 11	TEX; 24	PHO; 17	HOM; 23	20th	906
2014	Ryan Newman	31	Chevy	DAY; 22	PHO; 7	LVS; 7	BRI; 16	CAL; 20	MAR; 20	TEX; 16	DAR; 10	RCH; 8	TAL; 18	KAN; 11	CLT; 15	DOV; 31	POC; 7	MCH; 15	SON; 11	KEN; 3	DAY; 24	NHA; 5	IND; 11	POC; 8	GLN; 41	MCH; 11	BRI; 13	ATL; 7	RCH; 9	CHI; 15	NHA; 18	DOV; 8	KAN; 6	CLT; 7	TAL; 5	MAR; 3	TEX; 15	PHO; 11	HOM; 2	2nd	5042
2015	Ryan Newman	31	Chevy	DAY; 38	ATL; 10	LVS; 3	PHO; 3	CAL; 5	MAR; 27	TEX; 12	BRI; 5	RCH; 11	TAL; 7	KAN; 10	CLT; 6	DOV; 18	POC; 39	MCH; 18	SON; 9	DAY; 8	KEN; 20	NHA; 11	IND; 11	POC; 23	GLN; 15	MCH; 8	BRI; 10	DAR; 13	RCH; 20	CHI; 4	NHA; 10	DOV; 19	CLT; 15	KAN; 11	TAL; 12	MAR; 7	TEX; 22	PHO; 11	HOM; 17	11th	2314
2016	Ryan Newman	31	Chevy	DAY; 11	ATL; 24	LVS; 13	PHO; 39	CAL; 14	MAR; 10	TEX; 17	BRI; 9	RCH; 18	TAL; 28	KAN; 7	DOV; 16	CLT; 10	POC; 12	MCH; 11	SON; 8	DAY; 18	KEN; 3	NHA; 7	IND; 31	POC; 12	GLN; 16	BRI; 28	MCH; 17	DAR; 8	RCH; 28	CHI; 19	NHA; 20	DOV; 17	CLT; 4	KAN; 12	TAL; 14	MAR; 16	TEX; 10	PHO; 12	HOM; 25	18th	895
2017	Ryan Newman	31	Chevy	DAY; 21	ATL; 35	LVS; 17	PHO; 1	CAL; 15	MAR; 8	TEX; 26	BRI; 14	RCH; 7	TAL; 25	KAN; 40	CLT; 9	DOV; 4	POC; 14	MCH; 15	SON; 15	DAY; 5	KEN; 22	NHA; 27	IND; 3	POC; 14	GLN; 25	MCH; 4	BRI; 6	DAR; 7	RCH; 3	CHI; 23	NHA; 13	DOV; 13	CLT; 40	TAL; 2	KAN; 33	MAR; 14	TEX; 20	PHO; 20	HOM; 10	16th	2196
2018	Ryan Newman	31	Chevy	DAY; 8	ATL; 22	LVS; 11	PHO; 11	CAL; 21	MAR; 19	TEX; 27	BRI; 10	RCH; 37	TAL; 9	DOV; 33	KAN; 30	CLT; 35	POC; 25	MCH; 22	SON; 24	CHI; 15	DAY; 8	KEN; 21	NHA; 6	POC; 8	GLN; 19	MCH; 15	BRI; 12	DAR; 19	IND; 10	LVS; 9	RCH; 15	CLT; 11	DOV; 17	TAL; 25	KAN; 15	MAR; 8	TEX; 18	PHO; 11	HOM; 15	17th	769
2019	Tyler Reddick	31	Chevy	DAY; 27	ATL	LVS	PHO	CAL	MAR	TEX	BRI	RCH	TAL	DOV	KAN; 9	CLT	POC	MCH	SON	CHI	DAY	KEN	NHA	POC	GLN	MCH	BRI	DAR	IND	LVS	RCH	CLT	DOV	TAL	KAN	MAR	TEX	PHO	HOM	41st	38

=== Car No. 33 history ===
Part-time (2004–2008)

In 2004, it was announced that Kerry Earnhardt would drive the No. 33 car in five NASCAR Nextel Cup races. Mike Skinner would run the car in the Daytona 500, finishing 22nd. Earnhardt drove the car in the other three restrictor plate races with Bass Pro Shops sponsoring, getting his best finish of 24th. He attempted all of the restrictor plate races again in 2005, finishing 17th at Talladega. In addition, road course ringer Brian Simo brought home a 10th-place finish at Sonoma. Clint Bowyer (Childress' Busch Series driver) made his Nextel Cup debut in this car with a Sylvania sponsorship at Phoenix in April 2005. Scott Wimmer ran the season finale in 2005, attempted two races in 2006 (making one start), and only made one start out of seven attempts in 2007. On May 2, 2008, Wimmer attempted but failed to qualify for the 2008 Crown Royal presents the Dan Lowry 400 at Richmond. Wimmer had sponsorships from Holiday Inn and Camping World/RVs.com. Ken Schrader and Mike Wallace ran one race apice in 2008.

Clint Bowyer (2009–2011)

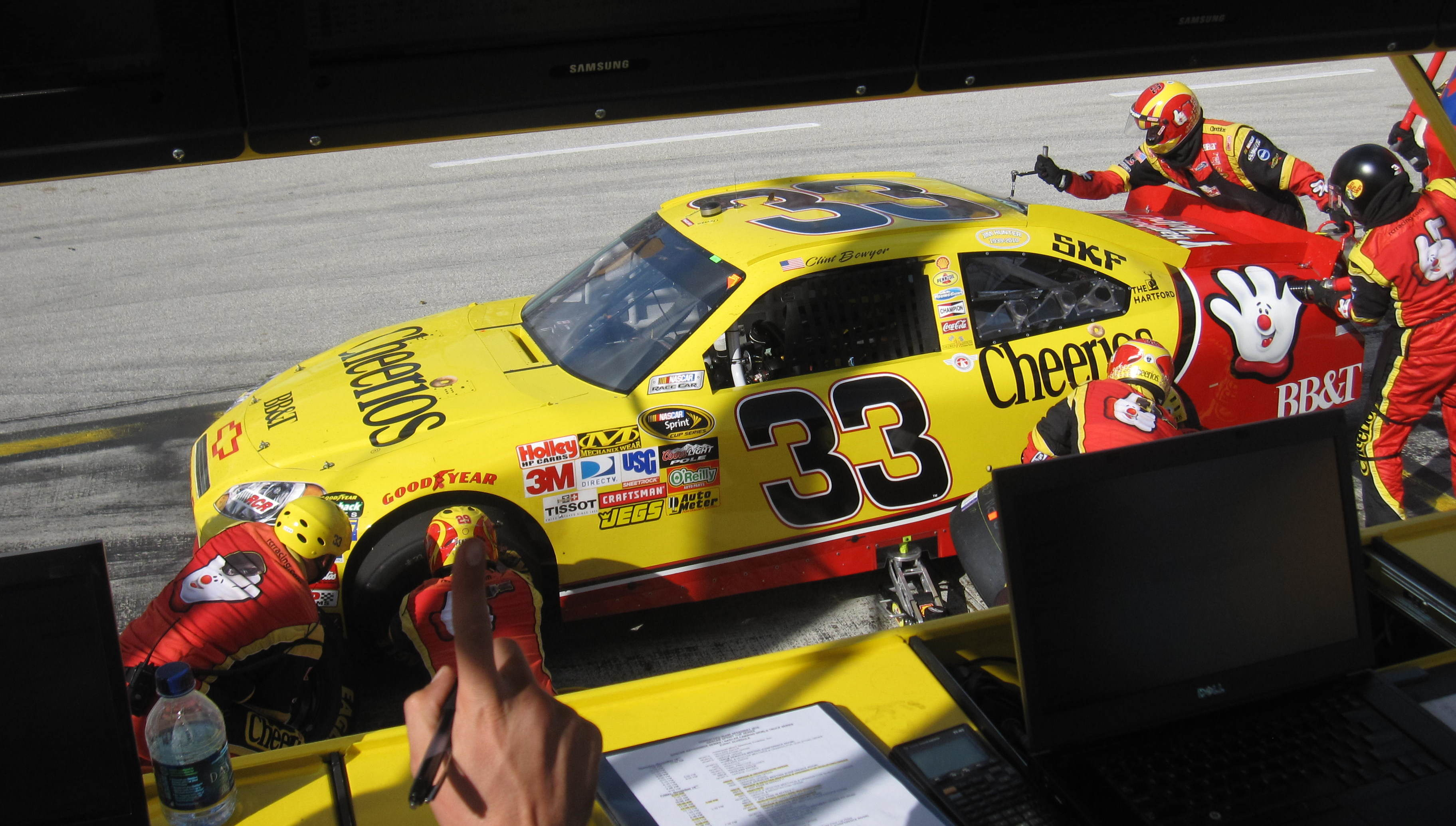
Clint Bowyer's No. 33 in the pits at Homestead in 2010

RCR expanded to 4 full-time NASCAR Cup Series teams in 2009 with sponsorship from General Mills' Cheerios and Hamburger Helper sponsorships on the No. 33 Chevrolet. On August 23, 2008, RCR driver Clint Bowyer was announced as the driver of the No. 33 General Mills-sponsored Chevrolet Impala SS for the 2009 season. Casey Mears took over Bowyer's previous car, the No. 07 Jack Daniel's-sponsored Chevrolet Impala SS. In his first race in the car, Bowyer finished fourth in the 2009 Daytona 500. However, the team failed to win in 2009.

The Hartford joined the team as an additional a sponsor of the No. 33 during 2010, and Bowyer's consistency improved markedly. The team had a fairly solid season in 2010.

However, in 2011, the team struggled with consistency. With the departure of Bowyer to Michael Waltrip Racing for 2012, General Mills moved its sponsorship over to the No. 31 team, leaving the No. 33 team without a driver or sponsor.

Circle Sport (2012–2015)

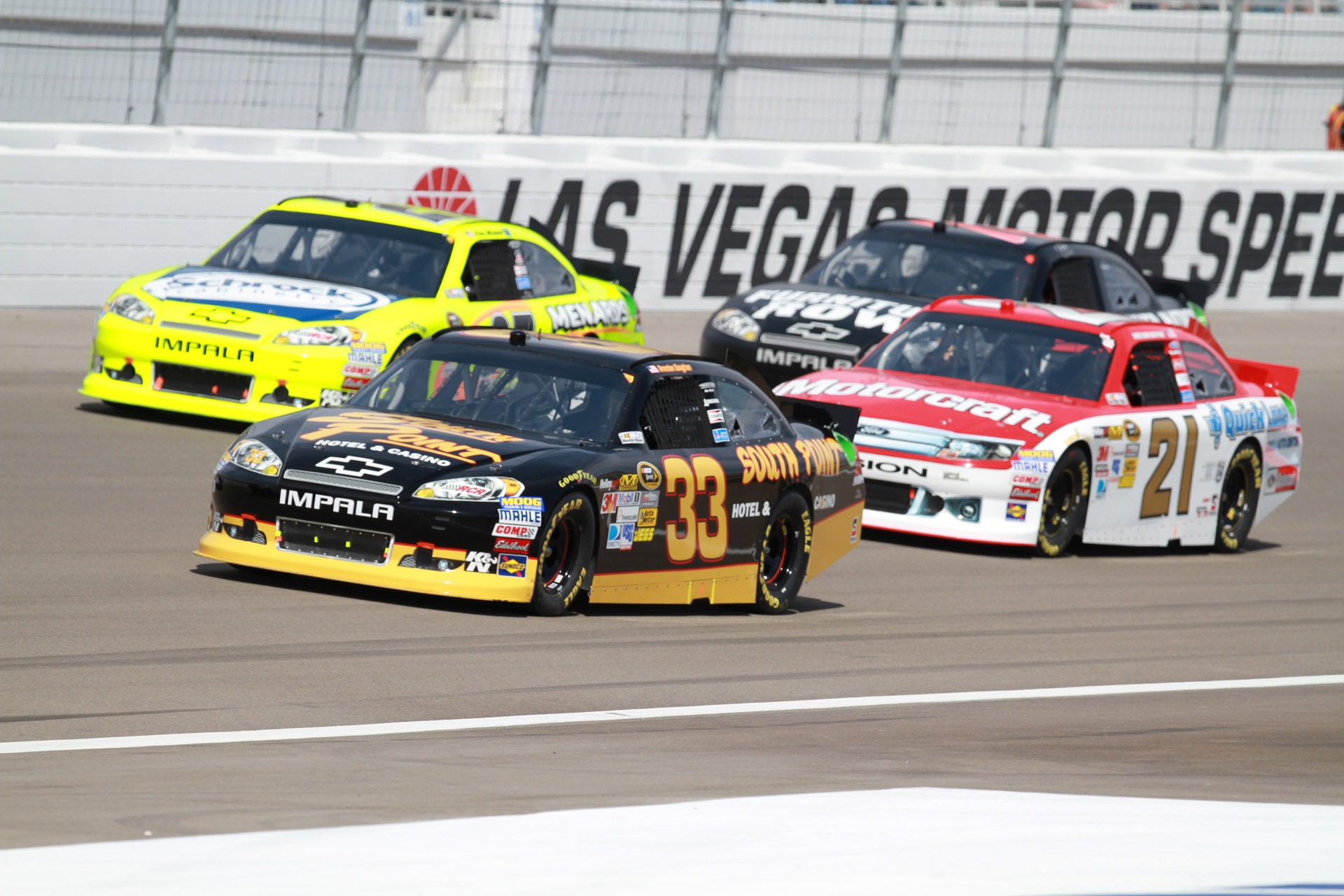
Brendan Gaughan at Las Vegas in 2012.

The No. 33 began 2012 with the intent of running only as long as sponsorship would allow. Kroger and General Mills sponsored at the Daytona 500 with Elliott Sadler driving. Brendan Gaughan drove the next four races with his family's South Point Hotel, Casino & Spa on the car. Elliott's brother Hermie Sadler then drove at Martinsville with Anderson's Maple Syrup sponsoring. This would be the last race for the 33 under RCR control, fielded as a collaboration with the new team ownership (see below).

In April 2012, Childress announced that he sold the No. 33 to Joe Falk and Mike Hillman, Sr., who had fielded the No. 40 twice earlier in the season but had yet to qualify for a race. However, they kept the number 33, with the team assuming the name Circle Sport. Falk and Hillman took over the car at Texas in April. The transfer allowed RCR to field the number for their entries on limited occasions. In the first of these occasions, Austin Dillon ran the car under the RCR banner with American Ethanol, finishing 24th at the June Michigan race. For 2013, the same arrangement continued, with Dillon running the No. 33 as an RCR entry for selected races including Daytona, Michigan, and Indianapolis. Brian Scott ran an RCR car in his Cup debut at the 2013 Bank of America 500, finishing 27th.

In 2014, RCR ran the 33 in the first two races of the season with Scott and his family's Whitetail Club. Scott finished fifth in his Daytona Duel to earn a spot in the Daytona 500, then finished 25th in the race after several accidents. Scott ran the next race at Phoenix, starting and finishing 32nd. Scott was involved in a controversy in the fifth race of the season at Fontana, when he spun out Cup Series regular Aric Almirola, who expressed displeasure at Scott's driving and source of sponsorship after getting out of the car. Scott would finish 35th in that race. Brian then won the pole at the spring Talladega race, his first career Cup pole. Scott would not lead any laps, however, and finished 42nd after crashing out. 2000 Cup Champion Bobby Labonte, who was doing test driving for RCR, drove the same car at the summer Daytona race, under the Circle Sport banner. The car again had speed in qualifying, timing in 4th. Labonte would contend for the lead for much of the race but finish 26th after being swept up in the Big One. Richard Childress' younger grandson Ty Dillon drove at Atlanta and Phoenix in the fall, with sponsorship from Rheem, Realtree and Charter Communications.

Ty Dillon attempted the 2015 Daytona 500 in the No. 33 for RCR with Cheerios and Kroger sponsoring. Dillon qualified for the Daytona 500 and finished 28th. Brian Scott qualified for Atlanta in the No. 33 (under the Circle Sport banner) the next week, but gave up his seat to HScott Motorsports after their driver Michael Annett missed the race. Under NASCAR rules, Falk would receive owner's points. Scott raced the next week at Las Vegas for RCR, finishing 13th, and also ran well two races later at Fontana before finishing 27th. Scott made the field at Talladega in May, but finished last after a blown engine and subsequent crash collecting Michael Waltrip. Dillon ran the car at Kansas in May promoting SpongeBob SquarePants character Plankton. Scott drove the car at Dover with Acme Markets and Kraft, finishing 36th after a crash with Kyle Busch. Dillon returned at Pocono and Michigan in June with Yuengling and Nexium sponsoring in respective events. Scott returned with Shore Lodge at the July Daytona race and the Brickyard 400. The 33 shut down at the end of the season.

Part-time with multiple drivers (2022–2026)

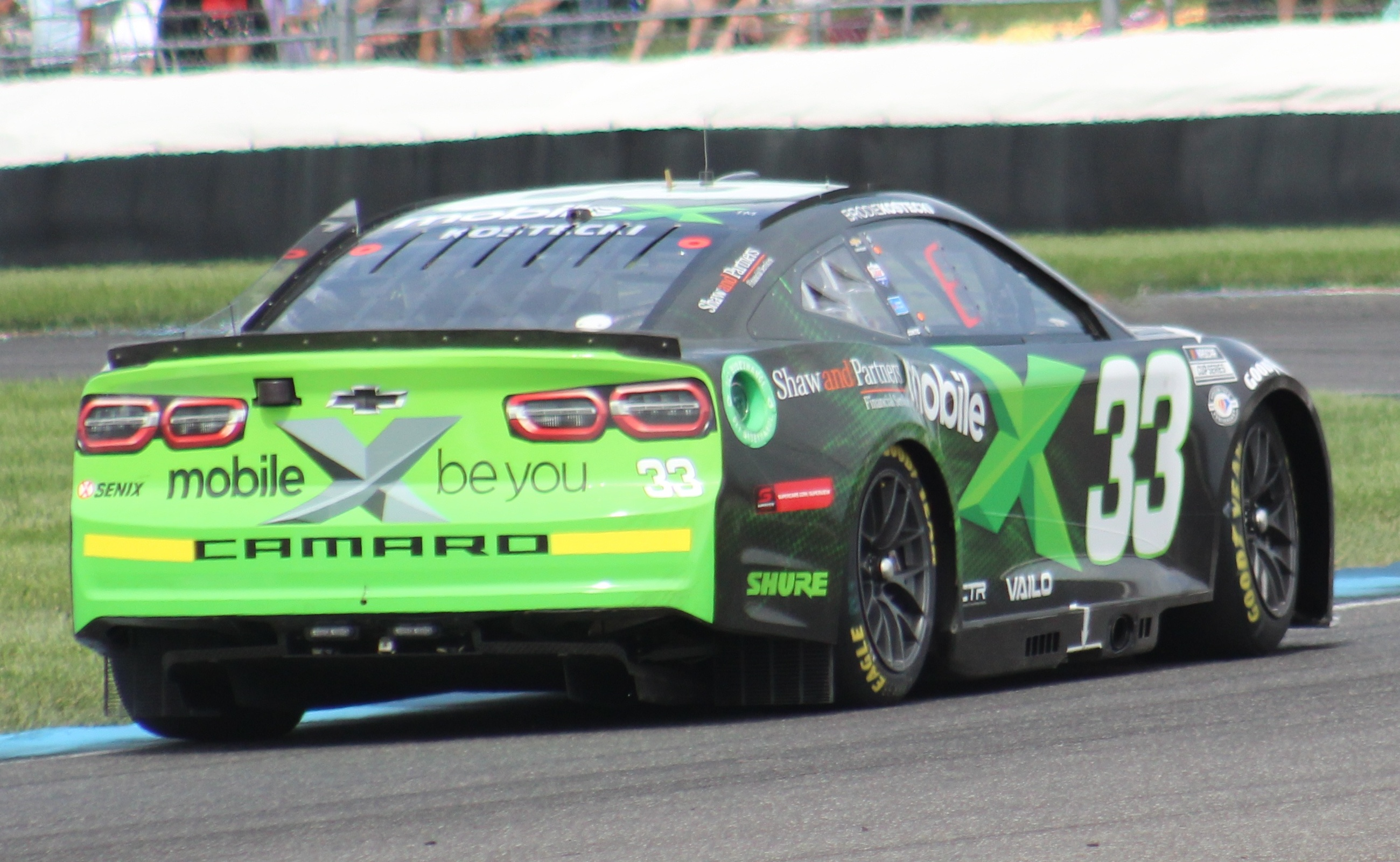
Brodie Kostecki at the 2023 Verizon 200 at the Brickyard

On August 2, 2022, RCR announced that Austin Hill would make his Cup Series debut in the No. 33 at Michigan, where He would notch a top 20 finishing in 18th.

On July 18, 2023, Richard Childress Racing and Australian V8 Supercars Points Leader Brodie Kostecki announced that Kostecki would make his Cup Series debut in the No. 33 at the Indianapolis Road Course. Kostecki followed in the footsteps of fellow Supercars driver Shane van Gisbergen who won on his first start with Trackhouse Racing. He would be joined by Australian companies VAILO and Shaw & Companies amongst other companies for sponsorship.

In 2024, Richard Childress announced that Brodie Kostecki would return to the 33 for up to five races in 2024, including an oval race. Paul Morris, Kostecki's long–time mentor, later confirmed that the planned races had been axed.

On April 5, RCR announced that Hill would return to the 33 for multiple races starting with Texas.

On May 3, it was announced that Will Brown would make his NASCAR debut at Sonoma.

For the 2025 season, the No. 33 car was split between Hill and Jesse Love. Hill scored his first career Cup top-10 with a ninth-place finish at the Chicago street race.

In 2026, the No. 33 car was split again between Love and Hill. Love drove the car at COTA and Talladega, while Hill was scheduled for five races starting at Phoenix. Following the death of Kyle Busch on May 21, the No. 8 car's charter and owner points were transferred to the No. 33 car, starting with the Coca-Cola 600 with Hill behind the wheel.

Austin Hill (2027)

On August 24, 2026, RCR announced that Austin Hill would be signed to the No. 33 car full-time for the 2027 season and for the foreseeable future.

==== Car No. 33 results ====
Year	Driver	No.	Make	1	2	3	4	5	6	7	8	9	10	11	12	13	14	15	16	17	18	19	20	21	22	23	24	25	26	27	28	29	30	31	32	33	34	35	36	Owners	Pts
2004	Mike Skinner	33	Chevy	DAY; 22	CAR	LVS	ATL	DAR	BRI	TEX	MAR																													51st	465
2004	Kerry Earnhardt	33	Chevy									TAL; 35	CAL	RCH	CLT	DOV	POC	MCH; DNQ	SON	DAY; 28	CHI	NHA	POC	IND	GLN	MCH; DNQ	BRI	CAL				TAL; 24	KAN	CLT	MAR	ATL; DNQ	PHO	DAR	HOM	51st	465
2004	Johnny Sauter	33	Chevy																										RCH; DNQ	NHA; DNQ	DOV									51st	465
2005	Kerry Earnhardt	33	Chevy	DAY; DNQ	CAL	LVS	ATL	BRI	MAR	TEX		TAL; 17	DAR	RCH	CLT	DOV	POC	MCH		DAY; 42	CHI	NHA	POC	IND	GLN	MCH	BRI	CAL	RCH	NHA	DOV	TAL; 39	KAN	CLT	MAR	ATL	TEX	PHO	HOM	53rd	454
2005	Clint Bowyer	33	Chevy								PHO; 22																													53rd	454
2005	Brian Simo	33	Chevy																SON; 10																					53rd	454
2006	Scott Wimmer	33	Chevy	DAY	CAL	LVS	ATL	BRI	MAR	TEX	PHO	TAL	RCH	DAR	CLT	DOV	POC	MCH	SON	DAY	CHI	NHA	POC	IND	GLN	MCH	BRI	CAL	RCH	NHA	DOV	KAN	TAL	CLT	MAR	ATL	TEX	PHO	HOM; 12	60th	127
2007	Scott Wimmer	33	Chevy	DAY	CAL	LVS	ATL; DNQ	BRI	MAR	TEX; DNQ	PHO	TAL	RCH	DAR	CLT	DOV	POC	MCH	SON	NHA	DAY	CHI	IND; 31	POC	GLN	MCH	BRI	CAL	RCH	NHA	DOV; DNQ	KAN	TAL	CLT	MAR	ATL	TEX	PHO	HOM	54th	142
2008	Scott Wimmer	33	Chevy	DAY	CAL	LVS	ATL	BRI	MAR	TEX	PHO	TAL	RCH; DNQ	DAR																										50th	165
2008	Ken Schrader	33	Chevy												CLT; 33	DOV	POC	MCH	SON	NHA	DAY	CHI	IND	POC	GLN	MCH	BRI	CAL	RCH	NHA	DOV	KAN								50th	165
2008	Mike Wallace	33	Chevy																														TAL; 30	CLT	MAR	ATL	TEX	PHO	HOM	50th	165
2009	Clint Bowyer	33	Chevy	DAY; 4	CAL; 19	LVS; 2	ATL; 6	BRI; 13	MAR; 5	TEX; 22	PHO; 26	TAL; 39	RCH; 18	DAR; 37	CLT; 36	DOV; 11	POC; 12	MCH; 10	SON; 8	NHA; 20	DAY; 29	CHI; 9	IND; 18	POC; 3	GLN; 9	MCH; 8	BRI; 21	ATL; 29	RCH; 6	NHA; 10	DOV; 15	KAN; 21	CAL; 9	CLT; 6	MAR; 19	TAL; 12	TEX; 7	PHO; 7	HOM; 11	15th	4359
2010	Clint Bowyer	33	Chevy	DAY; 4	CAL; 8	LVS; 8	ATL; 23	BRI; 40	MAR; 7	PHO; 9	TEX; 36	TAL; 7	RCH; 12	DAR; 32	DOV; 17	CLT; 7	POC; 9	MCH; 22	SON; 31	NHA; 7	DAY; 17	CHI; 4	IND; 4	POC; 15	GLN; 32	MCH; 13	BRI; 4	ATL; 7	RCH; 6	NHA; 1*	DOV; 25	KAN; 15	CAL; 2	CLT; 17	MAR; 38	TAL; 1	TEX; 7	PHO; 21	HOM; 12	10th	6155
2011	Clint Bowyer	33	Chevy	DAY; 17	PHO; 27	LVS; 15	BRI; 35	CAL; 7	MAR; 9	TEX; 2	TAL; 2	RCH; 6	DAR; 31	DOV; 6	CLT; 15	KAN; 18	POC; 16	MCH; 8	SON; 4	DAY; 36	KEN; 35	NHA; 17	IND; 13	POC; 18	GLN; 11	MCH; 8	BRI; 26	ATL; 36	RCH; 22	CHI; 7	NHA; 26	DOV; 8	KAN; 7	CLT; 24	TAL; 1	MAR; 19	TEX; 9	PHO; 10	HOM; 6	13th	1047
2012	Elliott Sadler	33	Chevy	DAY; 27																																				37th	253
2012	Brendan Gaughan	33	Chevy		PHO; 27	LVS; 34	BRI; 22	CAL; 43																																37th	253
2012	Hermie Sadler	33	Chevy						MAR; 31	TEX	KAN	RCH	TAL	DAR	CLT	DOV	POC																							37th	253
2012	Austin Dillon	33	Chevy															MCH; 24	SON	KEN	DAY	NHA	IND	POC	GLN	MCH	BRI	ATL	RCH	CHI	NHA	DOV	TAL	CLT	KAN	MAR	TEX	PHO	HOM	37th	253
2013	Austin Dillon	33	Chevy	DAY; 31	PHO	LVS	BRI	CAL	MAR	TEX	KAN	RCH	TAL	DAR	CLT	DOV	POC	MCH; 11	SON	KEN	DAY	NHA	IND; 26	POC	GLN	MCH	BRI	ATL; 19	RCH	CHI	NHA	DOV	KAN				TEX; 22	PHO	HOM	38th	441
2013	Brian Scott	33	Chevy																															CLT; 27	TAL	MAR				38th	441
2014	Brian Scott	33	Chevy	DAY; 25	PHO; 32	LVS	BRI	CAL; 35	MAR	TEX	DAR	RCH	TAL; 42	KAN	CLT; 32	DOV	POC	MCH	SON	KEN	DAY	NHA	IND	POC	GLN	MCH	BRI												HOM; 28	40th	337
2014	Ty Dillon	33	Chevy																									ATL; 25	RCH	CHI	NHA	DOV	KAN	CLT	TAL	MAR	TEX	PHO; 27		40th	337
2015	Ty Dillon	33	Chevy	DAY; 28	ATL									KAN; 26	CLT		POC; 18	MCH; 14	SON																				HOM; 23	35th	458
2015	Brian Scott	33	Chevy			LVS; 13	PHO	CAL; 27	MAR	TEX	BRI	RCH	TAL; 43			DOV; 38				DAY; 42	KEN	NHA	IND; 36	POC	GLN	MCH	BRI	DAR	RCH; 22	CHI; 22	NHA	DOV	CLT	KAN; 12	TAL	MAR	TEX; 14	PHO		35th	458
2022	Austin Hill	33	Chevy	DAY	CAL	LVS	PHO	ATL	COA	RCH	MAR	BRI	TAL	DOV	DAR	KAN	CLT	GTW	SON	NSS	ROA	ATL	NHA	POC	IND	MCH; 18	RCH	GLN	DAY	DAR	KAN	BRI	TEX	TAL	CLT	LVS	HOM	MAR	PHO	41st	19
2023	Brodie Kostecki	33	Chevy	DAY	CAL	LVS	PHO	ATL	COA	RCH	BRD	MAR	TAL	DOV	KAN	DAR	CLT	GTW	SON	NSS	CSC	ATL	NHA	POC	RCH	MCH	IRC; 22	GLN	DAY	DAR	KAN	BRI	TEX	TAL	ROV	LVS	HOM	MAR	PHO	42nd	15
2024	Austin Hill	33	Chevy	DAY	ATL	LVS	PHO	BRI	COA	RCH	MAR	TEX; 38	TAL	DOV	KAN; 33	DAR	CLT	GTW					CSC; 31	POC				DAY; 25	DAR	ATL	GLN	BRI	KAN	TAL	ROV	LVS	HOM	MAR	PHO	43rd	47
2024	Will Brown	33	Chevy																SON; 31	IOW	NHA	NSS																		43rd	47
2024	Ty Dillon	33	Chevy																						IND; 19	RCH	MCH													43rd	47
2025	Austin Hill	33	Chevy	DAY	ATL	COA	PHO	LVS	HOM	MAR	DAR; 31											CSC; 9	SON	DOV	IND	IOW	GLN		DAY; 30	DAR	GTW	BRI; 25	NHA	KAN	ROV	LVS	TAL; 22	MAR	PHO	38th	88
2025	Jesse Love	33	Chevy									BRI; 31	TAL	TEX	KAN; 29	CLT	NSS	MCH	MXC	POC	ATL							RCH; 33												38th	88
2026	Jesse Love	33	Chevy	DAY	ATL	COA; 27							TAL; 27	TEX	GLN																									32nd	482
2026	Austin Hill	33	Chevy				PHO; 21	LVS	DAR	MAR; 33	BRI	KAN				CLT; 27	NSS; 27	MCH; 20	POC; 18	COR; 36	SON; 34	CHI; 37	ATL; 31	NWS; 33	IND; 33	IOW; 26	RCH; 23	NHA; 24	DAY; 27*	DAR; 28	GTW; 21	BRI; 29	KAN; 26	LVS; 22	CLT; 32	PHO; 24	TAL; 14	MAR; 20	HOM; 15	32nd	482

From 2012 to 2015, RCR shared their owner points with Joe Falk's team, Circle Sport. The 33 car ran races not raced by RCR under the ownership of Falk, thus making their owner's points for the 33 reflective of an entire 36 race season rather than the part time schedule RCR ran.

In 2026, following the death of Kyle Busch on May 21, the No. 8 car's charter and owner points were transferred to the No. 33 car

== Other cars ==
Car No. 03 (1977)

In 1977, the team fielded the No. 03 car for two races with Bill Seifert as the driver.

=== Car No. 03 results ===
Year	Driver	No.	Make	1	2	3	4	5	6	7	8	9	10	11	12	13	14	15	16	17	18	19	20	21	22	23	24	25	26	27	28	29	30	31	32	33	34	35	36	Owners	Pts
1977	Bill Seifert	03	Chevy	RSD	DAY	RCH	CAR	ATL	NWS	DAR	BRI	MAR	TAL	NSV	DOV	CLT	RSD	MCH; 12	DAY	NSV	POC	TAL	MCH	BRI	DAR	RCH	DOV; 33	MAR	NWS	CLT	CAR	ATL	ONT								

Car No. 22 (1988)

In 1988, the team fielded the No. 22 car at Rockingham with Rodney Combs as the driver, He finished in last place.

=== Car No. 22 results ===
Year	Driver	No.	Make	1	2	3	4	5	6	7	8	9	10	11	12	13	14	15	16	17	18	19	20	21	22	23	24	25	26	27	28	29	30	31	32	33	34	35	36	Owners	Pts
1988	Rodney Combs	22	Chevy	DAY	RCH	CAR	ATL	DAR	BRI	NWS	MAR	TAL	CLT	DOV	RSD	POC	MCH	DAY	POC	TAL	GLN	MCH	BRI	DAR	RCH	DOV	MAR	CLT; DNQ	NWS	CAR; 40	PHO	ATL									

Car No. 90 (2003)

In 2003, RCR entered the No. 90 Chevrolet in the fall Talladega race with John Andretti driving. The car was sponsored by AOL 9.0 and was numbered 90 for marketing purposes which was originally going to be No. 75 in honor Neil Bonnett. Ron Hornaday Jr. ran the No. 90 in the season-ending Ford 400 with Childress Vineyards on the hood.

=== Car No. 90 results ===
Year	Driver	No.	Make	1	2	3	4	5	6	7	8	9	10	11	12	13	14	15	16	17	18	19	20	21	22	23	24	25	26	27	28	29	30	31	32	33	34	35	36	Owners	Pts
2003	John Andretti	90	Chevy	DAY	CAR	LVS	ATL	DAR	BRI	TEX	TAL	MAR	CAL	RCH	CLT	DOV	POC	MCH	SON	DAY	CHI	NHA	POC	IND	GLN	MCH	BRI	DAR	RCH	NHA	DOV	TAL; 15	KAN	CLT	MAR	ATL	PHO	CAR		62nd	103
2003	Ron Hornaday Jr.	90	Chevy																																				HOM; 20	62nd	103

Car No. 96 (1972)

In 1972, the team fielded the No. 96 car for fourteen races with Childress driving it.

=== Car No. 96 results ===
Year	Driver	No.	Make	1	2	3	4	5	6	7	8	9	10	11	12	13	14	15	16	17	18	19	20	21	22	23	24	25	26	27	28	29	30	31	Owners	Pts
1972	Richard Childress	96	Chevy	RSD	DAY	RCH; 29	ONT; DNQ	CAR; 37	ATL	BRI; 18	DAR	NWS; 27	MAR; 29	TAL; DNQ	CLT	DOV; 37	MCH; 19	RSD	TWS; 31	DAY	BRI; 26	TRN; 18	ATL	TAL	MCH	NSV; 16	DAR	RCH; 25	DOV; 33	MAR; 33	NWS; 25	CLT	CAR	TWS	37th	1521.25

Car No. 98 (2011)

Austin Dillon made his Cup Series debut at Kansas in October 2011, with sponsorship from Camping World on the No. 98 Chevrolet. The car was fielded in association with music executive Mike Curb and promoted the Ronald Reagan Centennial Celebration. The entry was allowed because of NASCAR's policy that allows teams to field a fifth car if it is fielded for a rookie in seven or less races.

=== Car No. 98 results ===
Year	Driver	No.	Make	1	2	3	4	5	6	7	8	9	10	11	12	13	14	15	16	17	18	19	20	21	22	23	24	25	26	27	28	29	30	31	32	33	34	35	36	Owners	Pts
2011	Austin Dillon	98	Chevy	DAY	PHO	LVS	BRI	CAL	MAR	TEX	TAL	RCH	DAR	DOV	CLT	KAN	POC	MCH	SON	DAY	KEN	NHA	IND	POC	GLN	MCH	BRI	ATL	RCH	CHI	NHA	DOV	KAN; 26	CLT	TAL	MAR	TEX	PHO	HOM	51st	18
