= 2008 Dodge Challenger 500 =

Race details
- Race 11 of 36 in the 2008 NASCAR Sprint Cup Series season
- Layout of Darlington Raceway
- Date: May 10, 2008
- Official name: Dodge Challenger 500
- Location: Darlington Raceway, Darlington County, South Carolina
- Course: Permanent racing facility
- Course length: 1.366 miles (2.198 km)
- Distance: 367 laps, 501.322 mi (806.799 km)
- Weather: Chilly with temperatures plummeting as low as 64 °F (18 °C); wind speeds up to 12 miles per hour (19 km/h)
- Average speed: 140.35 miles per hour (225.87 km/h)

Pole position
Driver	Greg Biffle	Roush Fenway Racing
- Time: 27.405

Most laps led
Driver	Kyle Busch	Joe Gibbs Racing
- Laps: 169

Winner
No. 18	Kyle Busch	Joe Gibbs Racing

Television in the United States
- Network: Fox Broadcasting Company
- Announcers: Mike Joy, Darrell Waltrip and Larry McReynolds

The 2008 Dodge Challenger 500, the 59th running of the event, was the eleventh race on the NASCAR Sprint Cup season. It was held on Saturday, May 10, 2008 at the fabled Darlington Raceway in Darlington, South Carolina.

== Summary ==
The race was televised in the USA on Fox starting at 7 PM US EDT with radio being handled on MRN on terrestrial radio and Sirius Satellite Radio. It was the first race on the newly repaved 1.366 mile track as "The Lady in Black" has gone under an extreme makeover akin to plastic surgery, with speeds at Goodyear tire testing in March having cars clocked at or over 200 MPH.

The race also served as the last chance to qualify for Sprint All-Star Race XXIV to be held the following week at Lowe's Motor Speedway in Concord, North Carolina. Otherwise, those who have not won a race, a series championship or a previous All-Star race would have to qualify via the Sprint Showdown race as one of the top two finishers or through fan voting by being on the lead lap in the Showdown.

=== Pre-race news ===
- Back in the saddle for the #40 Chip Ganassi Racing Dodge was Sterling Marlin after Ken Schrader failed to make the Richmond race the previous week. Another change found Jeff Green replacing John Andretti in the #34 car, however they failed to qualify.

=== Qualifying ===
Greg Biffle edged out Dale Earnhardt Jr. for the pole position.

=== Race ===
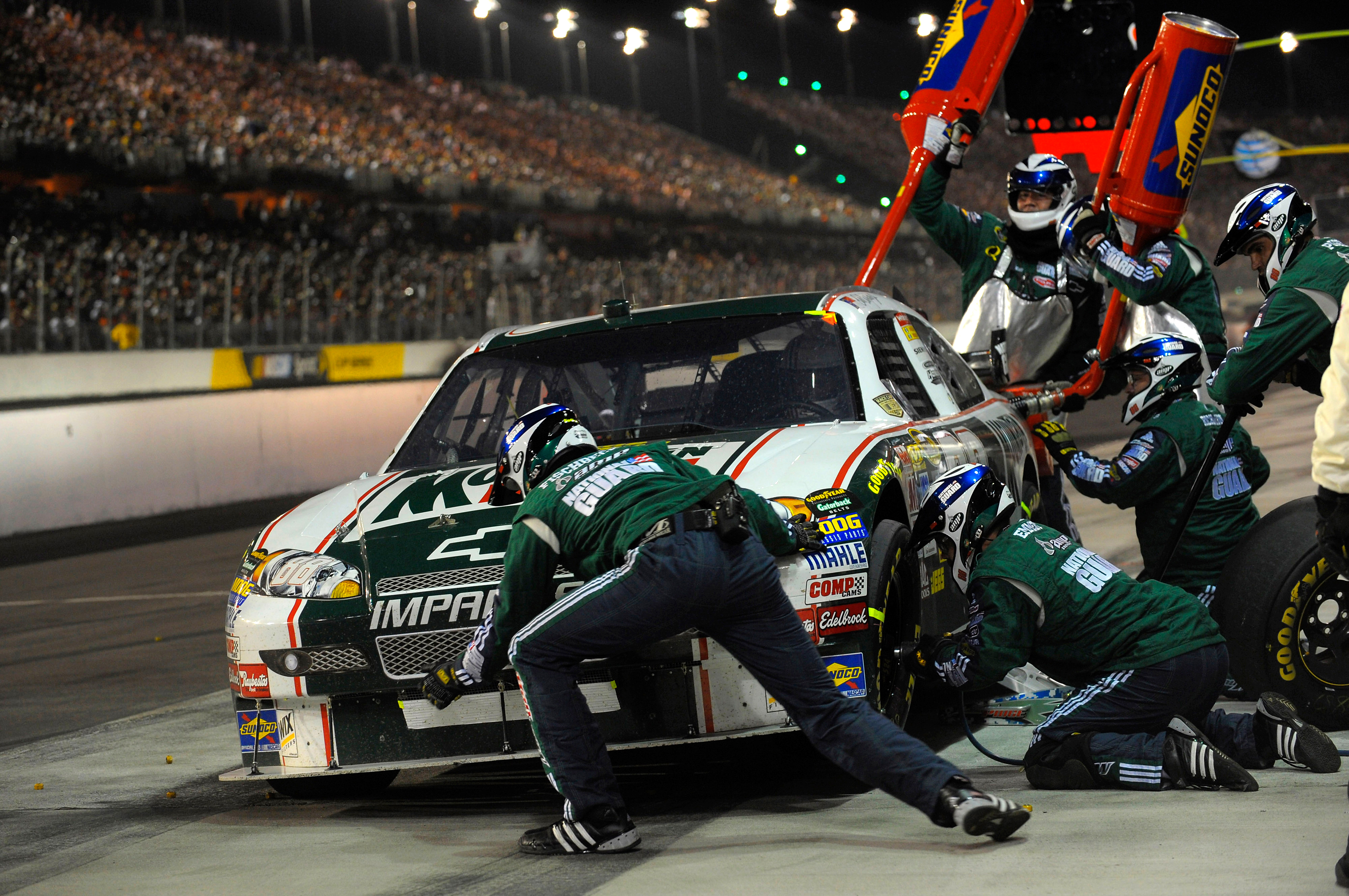
Dale Earnhardt Jr. on pit road, as his team completes a pit stop during the race.

After getting a rousing chorus of booing from Earnhardt fans for what he did the previous week at Richmond, Kyle Busch quieted them down with his third win of the 2008 campaign.

Other finishers in the top ten were Carl Edwards, Jeff Gordon, Dale Earnhardt Jr., David Ragan, Matt Kenseth, Denny Hamlin, Travis Kvapil, Dave Blaney and Jeff Burton.

Failed to Qualify: Johnny Sauter (#70), Jeff Green (#34).

== Top 10 results ==
Pos	No.	Driver	Team	Manufacturer
1	18	Kyle Busch	Joe Gibbs Racing	Toyota
2	99	Carl Edwards	Roush Fenway Racing	Ford
3	24	Jeff Gordon	Hendrick Motorsports	Chevrolet
4	88	Dale Earnhardt Jr.	Hendrick Motorsports	Chevrolet
5	6	David Ragan	Roush Fenway Racing	Ford
6	17	Matt Kenseth	Roush Fenway Racing	Ford
7	11	Denny Hamlin	Joe Gibbs Racing	Toyota
8	28	Travis Kvapil	Yates Racing	Ford
9	22	Dave Blaney	Bill Davis Racing	Toyota
10	31	Jeff Burton	Richard Childress Racing	Chevrolet

Previous race: 2008 Crown Royal Presents the Dan Lowry 400	Sprint Cup Series; 2008 season	Next race: 2008 Coca-Cola 600
