= 2008 Crown Royal Presents the Dan Lowry 400 =

2008 Crown Royal Presents The Dan Lowry 400
Race details
- Race 10 of 36 in the 2008 NASCAR Sprint Cup Series season
- 2008 Crown Royal Presents the Dan Lowry 400 program cover
- Date: May 3, 2008
- Official name: Crown Royal Presents The Dan Lowry 400
- Location: Richmond International Raceway, Richmond, Virginia
- Course: Permanent racing facility
- Course length: 0.75 miles (1.207 km)
- Distance: 410 laps, 307.5 mi (494.873 km)
- Scheduled distance: 400 laps, 300 mi (482.803 km)
- Weather: Temperatures reaching as low as 57 °F (14 °C); wind speeds up to 18.1 miles per hour (29.1 km/h)
- Average speed: 95.786 miles per hour (154.153 km/h)

Pole position
Driver	Denny Hamlin	Joe Gibbs Racing
- Time: 21.395

Most laps led
Driver	Denny Hamlin	Joe Gibbs Racing
- Laps: 381

Winner
No. 07	Clint Bowyer	Richard Childress Racing

Television in the United States
- Network: Fox Broadcasting Company
- Announcers: Mike Joy, Darrell Waltrip and Larry McReynolds

The 2008 Crown Royal Presents the Dan Lowry 400 was the tenth stock car race of the 2008 NASCAR Sprint Cup Series. The event was held on May 3, 2008, before a crowd of 112,000, at Richmond International Raceway in Richmond, Virginia. Originally scheduled for 400 laps, Clint Bowyer won the race after a late caution and subsequent green–white–checkered finish extended the race to 410 laps.

== Summary ==
The race was telecast on Fox starting at 7:45 pm EDT, with radio coverage on Sirius Satellite Radio and MRN beginning at 7:30 pm EDT. The race is named for Columbiana, Ohio resident Dan Lowry, who was the winner of an essay contest sponsored by race sponsor Crown Royal whisky. Clint Bowyer won the race.

=== Pre-race news ===
- Last week at Talladega, Ken Schrader filled in on the #70 Haas CNC Racing car. Schrader was the interim substitute for Dario Franchitti's #40 Chip Ganassi Racing Dodge, but failed to qualify.
- Johnny Sauter would return again to Haas and pilot their #70 ride for this race.

=== Race ===
The action came with 48 laps left. While Denny Hamlin who dominated the race, led on a fuel crisis, the caution flew for Casey Mears' crash. The crash involved Michael Waltrip in his self-owned #55 Toyota. The replays showed that Mears accidentally forced Waltrip into scraping across the wall. Then instantly afterwards Michael Waltrip pushed Mears around. These hits on Mears' rear caused him to eventually hit the wall nearly head-on. For the shove Waltrip was parked by NASCAR.

Denny Hamlin led 381 laps until a cut tire and a pit road penalty ended his day. On lap 398, Kyle Busch, spun Dale Earnhardt Jr. into the wall, triggering an enormous amount of controversy over the matter and intense boos from the crowd, as Earnhardt was extremely popular due to his family relations with his famous father Dale Earnhardt. Although many fans felt that Busch intentionally caused the accident, years later on Dirty Mo Radio Earnhardt would later address the incident and state that Busch did not intentionally cause the wreck. He would say that "Even in the moment, I knew that it wasn't [Busch] turning me on purpose." Earnhardt had said that Busch had simply had wanted to get a better run off of the corner, but had gotten loose and spun him. At the next Richmond race, Earnhardt would seem to get payback on Busch, as on lap 212 Earnhardt spun Busch heading into Turn 1.

However, Clint Bowyer surged in front of Busch before the caution flag was thrown. Bowyer was able to hold off Busch and Mark Martin to score his second career cup win, despite leading only two laps. His win was the last one when numbered 07, and his win brought Chevrolet to having the most NASCAR wins in history.

== Results ==
Pos	St	No.	Driver	Owner	Car	Laps	Money	Status	Led	Points
1	31	07	Clint Bowyer	Richard Childress	Chevrolet	410	226550	running	13	190
2	7	18	Kyle Busch	Joe Gibbs	Toyota	410	171100	running	0	170
3	2	8	Mark Martin	Dale Earnhardt, Inc.	Chevrolet	410	174108	running	0	165
4	15	20	Tony Stewart	Joe Gibbs	Toyota	410	157911	running	0	160
5	3	1	Martin Truex Jr.	Dale Earnhardt, Inc.	Chevrolet	410	133708	running	0	155
6	10	12	Ryan Newman	Roger Penske	Dodge	410	137975	running	0	150
7	19	99	Carl Edwards	Jack Roush	Ford	410	131375	running	0	146
8	11	29	Kevin Harvick	Richard Childress	Chevrolet	410	125411	running	0	142
9	28	24	Jeff Gordon	Rick Hendrick	Chevrolet	410	126186	running	0	138
10	9	9	Kasey Kahne	Gillett Evernham Motorsports	Dodge	410	113741	running	0	134
11	33	31	Jeff Burton	Richard Childress	Chevrolet	410	119658	running	0	130
12	5	41	Reed Sorenson	Chip Ganassi	Dodge	410	104464	running	0	127
13	39	43	Bobby Labonte	Petty Enterprises	Dodge	410	113011	running	0	124
14	23	16	Greg Biffle	Jack Roush	Ford	410	84575	running	0	121
15	22	88	Dale Earnhardt Jr.	Rick Hendrick	Chevrolet	410	83000	running	15	123
16	34	28	Travis Kvapil	Yates Racing	Ford	410	101089	running	0	115
17	13	6	David Ragan	Jack Roush	Ford	409	80850	running	0	112
18	17	22	Dave Blaney	Bill Davis	Toyota	408	90383	running	0	109
19	30	66	Scott Riggs	Gene Haas	Chevrolet	408	88158	running	0	106
20	8	19	Elliott Sadler	Gillett Evernham Motorsports	Dodge	408	100470	running	0	103
21	26	01	Regan Smith	Dale Earnhardt, Inc.	Chevrolet	408	81000	running	0	100
22	14	44	David Reutimann	Michael Waltrip	Toyota	407	71275	running	0	97
23	35	77	Sam Hornish Jr.	Roger Penske	Dodge	407	113650	running	0	94
24	1	11	Denny Hamlin	Joe Gibbs	Toyota	407	123166	running	381	101
25	41	09	Sterling Marlin	James Finch	Chevrolet	407	67975	running	0	0
26	38	7	Robby Gordon	Robby Gordon	Dodge	406	92608	running	0	85
27	42	45	Kyle Petty	Petty Enterprises	Dodge	406	81858	running	0	82
28	32	83	Brian Vickers	Dietrich Mateschitz	Toyota	406	70075	running	0	79
29	36	78	Joe Nemechek	Barney Visser	Chevrolet	406	66950	running	0	76
30	12	48	Jimmie Johnson	Rick Hendrick	Chevrolet	400	121411	running	0	73
31	25	15	Paul Menard	Dale Earnhardt, Inc.	Chevrolet	397	77150	running	0	70
32	6	42	Juan Pablo Montoya	Chip Ganassi	Dodge	389	94408	running	0	67
33	37	70	Johnny Sauter	Gene Haas	Chevrolet	374	67325	running	0	64
34	43	96	J. J. Yeley	Jeff Moorad	Toyota	365	74250	running	0	61
35	20	26	Jamie McMurray	Jack Roush	Ford	364	74125	crash	0	58
36	16	5	Casey Mears	Rick Hendrick	Chevrolet	354	83975	crash	0	55
37	27	55	Michael Waltrip	Michael Waltrip	Toyota	352	75397	parked	0	52
38	24	17	Matt Kenseth	Jack Roush	Ford	345	113366	running	0	49
39	18	84	A. J. Allmendinger	Dietrich Mateschitz	Toyota	259	65600	crash	1	51
40	29	00	Michael McDowell	Michael Waltrip	Toyota	258	65475	crash	0	43
41	40	38	David Gilliland	Yates Racing	Ford	229	65330	crash	0	40
42	21	2	Kurt Busch	Roger Penske	Dodge	229	65205	crash	0	37
43	4	10	Patrick Carpentier	Gillett Evernham Motorsports	Dodge	228	65471	crash	0	34
Failed to qualify
Pos	Driver	No.	Owner	Car						
44	Ken Schrader	40	Felix Sabates	Dodge						
45	Scott Wimmer	33	Richard Childress	Chevrolet						
46	John Andretti	34	Bob Jenkins	Chevrolet						
47	Jon Wood	21	Wood Brothers	Ford						

Previous race: 2008 Aaron's 499	Sprint Cup Series; 2008 season	Next race: 2008 Dodge Challenger 500
