= 2014 Bojangles' Southern 500 =

Race details
- Race 8 of 36 in the 2014 NASCAR Sprint Cup Series
- Date: April 12, 2014
- Location: Darlington Raceway in Darlington, South Carolina
- Course: Permanent racing facility
- Course length: 1.366 miles (2.198 km)
- Distance: 374 laps, 510.884 mi (822.188 km)
- Scheduled distance: 367 laps, 501.322 mi (806.800 km)
- Weather: Clear skies with a temperature of 81 °F (27 °C); wind out of the southwest at 10 mph (16 km/h)
- Average speed: 131.211 mph (211.164 km/h)

Pole position
Driver	Kevin Harvick	Stewart–Haas Racing
- Time: 26.802

Most laps led
Driver	Kevin Harvick	Stewart–Haas Racing
- Laps: 238

Winner
No. 4	Kevin Harvick	Stewart–Haas Racing

Television in the United States
- Network: Fox & MRN
- Announcers: Mike Joy, Darrell Waltrip and Larry McReynolds (Television); Joe Moore, Barney Hall and Jeff Striegle (Booth); Dave Moody (1 & 2) and Mike Bagley (3 & 4) (Turns) (Radio)
- Nielsen ratings: 3.6/7 (Final); 3.2/5 (Overnight); 5.921 Million viewers

The 2014 Bojangles' Southern 500, the 65th running of the event, was a NASCAR Sprint Cup Series stock car race held on April 12, 2014, at Darlington Raceway in Darlington, South Carolina. The race was contested over 374 laps – extended from 367 laps due to two attempts at a green–white–checker finish – on the 1.366 miles (2.198 km) oval, it was the eighth race of the 2014 NASCAR Sprint Cup Series. Kevin Harvick of Stewart–Haas Racing won the race, his second win of the season and first at Darlington, while Dale Earnhardt Jr. finished second. Jimmie Johnson, Matt Kenseth, and Greg Biffle rounded out the top five. The race was also the first Darlington race won by a polesitter since Dale Jarrett, in the 1997 Rebel (then a 400-mile race). The top rookies of the race were Kyle Larson (8th), Austin Dillon (11th), and Justin Allgaier (23rd). It was the longest race in Darlington Raceway history.

== Previous week's race ==
Joey Logano passed Jeff Gordon on the final lap to score the victory in the Duck Commander 500 at Texas Motor Speedway. "Talk about a lot of emotion," Logano said. "You feel like you are about to win the race and then the caution comes out when you come to take the white and you’re like, ‘You’ve got to be kidding me.'" “That was a great battle,” said Gordon. “At one point I thought we had a shot at it. We got a pretty good restart. Joey was right on me and I was pretty loose in one and two, and I wish I had gone a little bit higher in three and four. But, he got that run off of four and he got in the back of me, and I thought I was going to wreck, so at that point I was like second would be good."

== Report ==
=== Background ===
Darlington Raceway, the race track where the race was held.

Darlington Raceway is a four-turn 1.366 miles (2.198 km) oval. The track's first two turns are banked at twenty-five degrees, while the final two turns are banked two degrees lower at twenty-three degrees. The front stretch (the location of the finish line) and the back stretch is banked at six degrees. Darlington Raceway can seat up to 60,000 people. Matt Kenseth was the defending race winner after winning the 2013 race.

=== Entry list ===
The entry list for the Bojangles' Southern 500 was released on Tuesday, April 8, 2014 at 9:07 a.m. Eastern time. Forty-four drivers were entered for the race.

No.	Driver	Team	Manufacturer	Starts	Best Finish
1	Jamie McMurray	Chip Ganassi Racing	Chevrolet	11	2nd
2	Brad Keselowski (PC2)	Team Penske	Ford	5	3rd
3	Austin Dillon (R)	Richard Childress Racing	Chevrolet	0	—
4	Kevin Harvick	Stewart–Haas Racing	Chevrolet	13	2nd
5	Kasey Kahne	Hendrick Motorsports	Chevrolet	10	3rd
7	Michael Annett (R)	Tommy Baldwin Racing	Chevrolet	0	—
9	Marcos Ambrose	Richard Petty Motorsports	Ford	5	9th
10	Danica Patrick	Stewart–Haas Racing	Chevrolet	2	28th
11	Denny Hamlin	Joe Gibbs Racing	Toyota	8	1st
13	Casey Mears	Germain Racing	Chevrolet	10	17th
14	Tony Stewart (PC3)	Stewart–Haas Racing	Chevrolet	15	3rd
15	Clint Bowyer	Michael Waltrip Racing	Toyota	8	9th
16	Greg Biffle	Roush Fenway Racing	Ford	11	1st
17	Ricky Stenhouse Jr.	Roush Fenway Racing	Ford	1	18th
18	Kyle Busch	Joe Gibbs Racing	Toyota	9	1st
20	Matt Kenseth (PC5)	Joe Gibbs Racing	Toyota	15	1st
22	Joey Logano	Team Penske	Ford	5	9th
23	Alex Bowman (R)	BK Racing	Toyota	0	—
24	Jeff Gordon (PC6)	Hendrick Motorsports	Chevrolet	21	1st
26	Cole Whitt (R)	Swan Racing	Toyota	0	—
27	Paul Menard	Richard Childress Racing	Chevrolet	7	13th
30	Parker Kligerman (R)	Swan Racing	Toyota	0	—
31	Ryan Newman	Richard Childress Racing	Chevrolet	12	2nd
32	Travis Kvapil	Go FAS Racing	Ford	7	8th
33	David Stremme	Circle Sport	Chevrolet	7	24th
34	David Ragan	Front Row Motorsports	Ford	7	11th
35	David Reutimann	Front Row Motorsports	Ford	7	11th
36	Reed Sorenson	Tommy Baldwin Racing	Chevrolet	7	11th
38	David Gilliland	Front Row Motorsports	Ford	7	20th
40	Landon Cassill (i)	Circle Sport	Chevrolet	3	26th
41	Kurt Busch (PC4)	Stewart–Haas Racing	Chevrolet	13	3rd
42	Kyle Larson (R)	Chip Ganassi Racing	Chevrolet	0	—
43	Aric Almirola	Richard Petty Motorsports	Ford	2	19th
47	A. J. Allmendinger	JTG Daugherty Racing	Chevrolet	6	17th
48	Jimmie Johnson (PC1)	Hendrick Motorsports	Chevrolet	12	1st
51	Justin Allgaier (R)	HScott Motorsports	Chevrolet	0	—
55	Brian Vickers	Michael Waltrip Racing	Toyota	8	10th
66	Joe Nemechek (i)	Michael Waltrip Racing	Toyota	18	6th
77	Dave Blaney	Randy Humphrey Racing	Ford	13	9th
78	Martin Truex Jr.	Furniture Row Racing	Chevrolet	8	5th
83	Ryan Truex (R)	BK Racing	Toyota	0	—
88	Dale Earnhardt Jr.	Hendrick Motorsports	Chevrolet	14	4th
98	Josh Wise	Phil Parsons Racing	Chevrolet	2	38th
99	Carl Edwards	Roush Fenway Racing	Ford	10	2nd
Official entry list

Key	Meaning
(R)	Rookie
(i)	Ineligible for driver points
(PC#)	Past champions provisional

== Practice ==
=== First practice ===
Kevin Harvick was the fastest in the first practice session with a time of 27.679 and a speed of 177.665 mph (285.924 km/h). Kyle Larson was forced to go to a backup car after hitting the wall in turn 1.

Pos	No.	Driver	Team	Manufacturer	Time	Speed
1	4	Kevin Harvick	Stewart–Haas Racing	Chevrolet	27.679	177.665
2	15	Clint Bowyer	Michael Waltrip Racing	Toyota	27.823	176.746
3	48	Jimmie Johnson	Hendrick Motorsports	Chevrolet	27.835	176.670
Official first practice results

=== Second practice ===
Ryan Newman was the fastest in the final practice session with a time of 27.447 and a speed of 179.167 mph (288.341 km/h).

Pos	No.	Driver	Team	Manufacturer	Time	Speed
1	31	Ryan Newman	Richard Childress Racing	Chevrolet	27.447	179.167
2	9	Marcos Ambrose	Richard Petty Motorsports	Ford	27.476	178.978
3	24	Jeff Gordon	Hendrick Motorsports	Chevrolet	27.487	178.906
Official second practice results

== Qualifying ==
Kevin Harvick won the pole with a time of 26.802 and a speed of 183.479 mph (295.281 km/h). “I was on the bottom all day in practice and Rodney felt like in order to get the pole you were going to need to run the top after we ran our first run,’’ Harvick said. “That is the driver in him that is why he is good to have sitting there watching because he knows what is going on and he can relay. Also having Tim Fedewa up on top as a former driver knowing what is going on to relay what you need to do. We moved up and picked up in the second (session), felt like I didn't roll through there fast enough. In the last (session), felt like I rolled through there pretty good. It all worked out. Knockout qualifying paid off for us today. We were able to save the best for last.” Harvick's car had to go through tech inspection three times before he could take his car onto the track for qualifying. “It just seemed like the machine was a little bit off there for qualifying,’’ Rodney Childers said of NASCAR’s measuring device. “A lot of people had left-rear toe issues. We rolled through the first time and saw what it was and did what we always do to fix that amount, and we rolled back through again and it read the same thing again, which it shouldn't have. It's part of the process. It's up to the teams to get it right. Different teams have different tools in order to know whether they're going to be good or not. We haven't got the right tools developed yet to know that. It's something we’ve got to work on at (Stewart–Haas Racing). NASCAR works hard every week to try to get their machine closer and closer and more consistent. It's a two-way street. We’ve got to do a better job.’’ The only driver that failed to qualify was David Reutimann.

=== Qualifying results ===
Pos	No.	Driver	Team	Manufacturer	R1	R2	R3
1	4	Kevin Harvick	Stewart–Haas Racing	Chevrolet	26.951	26.883	26.802
2	22	Joey Logano	Team Penske	Ford	26.902	26.745	26.865
3	43	Aric Almirola	Richard Petty Motorsports	Ford	26.789	26.705	26.880
4	9	Marcos Ambrose	Richard Petty Motorsports	Ford	26.849	26.891	26.948
5	2	Brad Keselowski	Team Penske	Ford	26.947	26.927	27.011
6	1	Jamie McMurray	Chip Ganassi Racing	Chevrolet	26.767	26.879	27.017
7	31	Ryan Newman	Richard Childress Racing	Chevrolet	26.817	26.947	27.017
8	18	Kyle Busch	Joe Gibbs Racing	Toyota	26.916	26.969	27.055
9	24	Jeff Gordon	Hendrick Motorsports	Chevrolet	26.846	26.960	27.056
10	11	Denny Hamlin	Joe Gibbs Racing	Toyota	26.766	26.961	27.087
11	27	Paul Menard	Richard Childress Racing	Chevrolet	26.734	26.924	27.097
12	78	Martin Truex Jr.	Furniture Row Racing	Chevrolet	26.982	26.969	27.139
13	41	Kurt Busch	Stewart–Haas Racing	Chevrolet	26.816	26.993	—
14	55	Brian Vickers	Michael Waltrip Racing	Toyota	26.962	27.022	—
15	88	Dale Earnhardt Jr.	Hendrick Motorsports	Chevrolet	26.993	27.066	—
16	15	Clint Bowyer	Michael Waltrip Racing	Toyota	27.000	27.132	—
17	42	Kyle Larson (R)	Chip Ganassi Racing	Chevrolet	27.004	27.140	—
18	47	A. J. Allmendinger	JTG Daugherty Racing	Chevrolet	26.954	27.150	—
19	16	Greg Biffle	Roush Fenway Racing	Ford	26.932	27.177	—
20	3	Austin Dillon (R)	Richard Childress Racing	Chevrolet	26.933	27.182	—
21	99	Carl Edwards	Roush Fenway Racing	Ford	26.894	27.184	—
22	5	Kasey Kahne	Hendrick Motorsports	Chevrolet	26.945	27.201	—
23	14	Tony Stewart	Stewart–Haas Racing	Chevrolet	26.973	27.292	—
24	51	Justin Allgaier (R)	HScott Motorsports	Chevrolet	26.979	27.479	—
25	20	Matt Kenseth	Joe Gibbs Racing	Toyota	27.011	—	—
26	48	Jimmie Johnson	Hendrick Motorsports	Chevrolet	27.033	—	—
27	38	David Gilliland	Front Row Motorsports	Ford	27.087	—	—
28	17	Ricky Stenhouse Jr.	Roush Fenway Racing	Ford	27.110	—	—
29	98	Josh Wise	Phil Parsons Racing	Chevrolet	27.237	—	—
30	7	Michael Annett (R)	Tommy Baldwin Racing	Chevrolet	27.270	—	—
31	13	Casey Mears	Germain Racing	Chevrolet	27.273	—	—
32	34	David Ragan	Front Row Motorsports	Ford	27.289	—	—
33	10	Danica Patrick	Stewart–Haas Racing	Chevrolet	27.296	—	—
34	23	Alex Bowman (R)	BK Racing	Toyota	27.321	—	—
35	40	Landon Cassill	Circle Sport	Chevrolet	27.363	—	—
36	77	Dave Blaney	Humphrey Racing	Ford	27.380	—	—
37	33	David Stremme	Circle Sport	Chevrolet	27.469	—	—
38	30	Parker Kligerman (R)	Swan Racing	Toyota	27.543	—	—
39	83	Ryan Truex (R)	BK Racing	Toyota	27.565	—	—
40	36	Reed Sorenson	Tommy Baldwin Racing	Chevrolet	27.633	—	—
41	32	Travis Kvapil	Go FAS Racing	Ford	27.663	—	—
42	26	Cole Whitt (R)	Swan Racing	Toyota	27.680	—	—
43	66	Joe Nemechek	Identity Ventures Racing	Toyota	27.757	—	—
Failed to qualify
44	35	David Reutimann	Front Row Motorsports	Ford	27.551	—	—
Official qualifying results

== Race ==
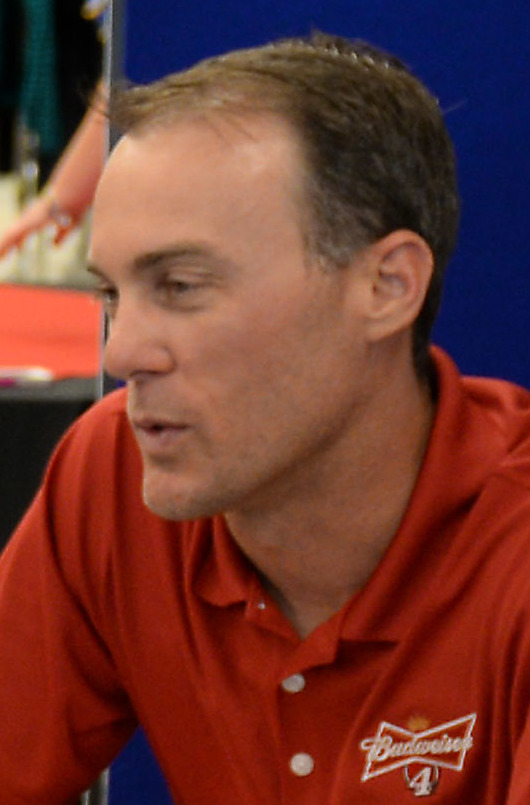
Kevin Harvick won the race from the pole position.

The race began at 6:45 p.m. Eastern time with Kevin Harvick leading the field to the green flag. He didn't hold the lead for long as Joey Logano passed him to take the top spot.

Jeff Gordon took the lead on lap 38.

The first caution of the race flew on lap 41 after rookie Ryan Truex slammed the wall in turn 3. David Ragan stayed out to lead a lap when Gordon pitted. Ragan made his stop the next lap and Gordon assumed the lead.

The race restarted on lap 47 and Kevin Harvick took the lead for the first time on the restart.

The second caution of the race flew on lap 59 after Travis Kvapil slammed the wall in turn 3. Denny Hamlin exited pit road with the lead by taking just two tires while Harvick took four.

The race restarted on lap 64 and Matt Kenseth took over the lead from his teammate.

Kevin Harvick retook the lead on lap 76.

The third caution of the race flew on lap 93 after rookie Michael Annett slammed the wall in turn 2.

The race restarted on lap 100.

The fourth caution of the race flew on lap 125 after rookie Cole Whitt slammed the wall in turn 1. David Ragan also slammed the wall in turn 2.

The race restarted on lap 131.

Kevin Harvick surrendered the lead on lap 180 to make his pit stop. Brad Keselowski took over the lead.

Keselowski ducked onto pit road on lap 183. Kasey Kahne assumed the lead.

The fifth caution of the race flew on lap 201 after Paul Menard slammed the wall in turn 1. Kahne swapped the lead with Kevin Harvick on pit road with the former stall being behind the start/finish line, but he exited as the leader.

The race restarted on lap 208 and Harvick took over the lead.

Austin Dillon and A. J. Allmendinger rubbed together in turn 2. Allmendinger's left-rear tire began rubbing real bad. He was saved by the sixth caution of the race on lap 222 after Aric Almirola clipped Danica Patrick and spun out in turn 2. Brian Vickers exited pit road with the lead thanks to taking two tires.

The race restarted on lap 227.

Debris in turn 2 brought out the seventh caution of the race on lap 247. Vickers swapped the lead with Jeff Gordon with the former pitting at the entrance of pit road. He exited pit road as the leader.

The race restarted on lap 252.

Kevin Harvick took back the lead on lap 255.

The eighth caution of the race flew with 96 laps to go for debris on the backstretch after Paul Menard slammed the wall exiting turn 2. Greg Biffle exited pit road as the leader thanks to taking just two tires.

The race restarted with 89 laps to go and Kevin Harvick took the lead.

While trying to enter pit road with 49 laps to go, Brian Vickers spun out and about blocked the entrance. He was almost rammed by Marcos Ambrose trying to get his car facing the right direction. He did get it going the right direction, but had to come back down pit road to serve a drive-through penalty not passing to the inside of the pit road commitment line.

Ricky Stenhouse Jr. assumed the lead when Harvick made his stop with 46 laps to go, but he missed the entrance to pit road and did not lead a lap. With 44 laps to go, Kasey Kahne took his car to the garage after slamming the wall in turn 2.

The ninth caution of the race flew with ten laps to go after Joey Logano's engine expired. Jimmie Johnson exited pit road as the leader by taking just two tires. Denny Hamlin was busted for speeding and had to drop to the tail end of the field.

The race restarted with five laps to go.

Debris in turn 3 that came from the No. 32 of Travis Kvapil brought out the tenth caution of the race with three laps to go. With the caution falling this close to the end, the race went into overtime.

Even though the inside line had been the preferred line all night, Johnson chose to restart on the outside. The race restarted with two laps to go on the first green-white-checker attempt and Dale Earnhardt Jr. took the lead from his teammate. They only made it half a lap before the caution flew for the eleventh time after Kurt Busch lost his momentum exiting turn 2, got turned by Clint Bowyer and slammed the inside wall head on.

The race restarted with two laps to go on the second green-white-checker attempt. Earnhardt got an excellent start to get ahead of Harvick, but Kevin with four tires passed Dale on two and took the victory. “This is the one race I told Rodney (Childers, crew chief) I wanted to win,” said Harvick. “We were able to put it all together, but this is the Southern 500, this is as big as it gets in NASCAR racing. It feels great. It's allowed us with the way the points system is to go for wins and not have to worry about the bad weeks too much,” he said. “Really proud for these guys and looking forward to the last 10." “It's a little disappointing to come that close because I know I don't really run that well here and the opportunities to win are going to be very few compared to other tracks,” said Earnhardt Jr. “It hurts a little bit to come that close because we worked so hard to try to win races. Running second is great but nobody is going to really remember that. But we're proud of it.” “Yeah, just very happy to finish there in the top three,” said Johnson. “I thought we had a shot at a win. I think if things stayed green after our last pit stop, we had a good chance at it, good shot at it. I'm happy with (crew chief) Chad's (Knaus) decision to go with two, and there were enough cars that took two that it gave us a little bit of a cushion, maybe enough of a cushion to make it four or five laps there.”

=== Race results ===
Pos	No.	Driver	Team	Manufacturer	Laps	Points
1	4	Kevin Harvick	Stewart–Haas Racing	Chevrolet	374	48
2	88	Dale Earnhardt Jr.	Hendrick Motorsports	Chevrolet	374	43
3	48	Jimmie Johnson	Hendrick Motorsports	Chevrolet	374	42
4	20	Matt Kenseth	Joe Gibbs Racing	Toyota	374	41
5	16	Greg Biffle	Roush Fenway Racing	Ford	374	40
6	18	Kyle Busch	Joe Gibbs Racing	Toyota	374	38
7	24	Jeff Gordon	Hendrick Motorsports	Chevrolet	374	38
8	42	Kyle Larson (R)	Chip Ganassi Racing	Chevrolet	374	36
9	14	Tony Stewart	Stewart–Haas Racing	Chevrolet	374	35
10	31	Ryan Newman	Richard Childress Racing	Chevrolet	374	34
11	3	Austin Dillon (R)	Richard Childress Racing	Chevrolet	374	33
12	15	Clint Bowyer	Michael Waltrip Racing	Toyota	374	32
13	99	Carl Edwards	Roush Fenway Racing	Ford	374	31
14	9	Marcos Ambrose	Richard Petty Motorsports	Ford	374	30
15	47	A. J. Allmendinger	JTG Daugherty Racing	Chevrolet	374	29
16	1	Jamie McMurray	Chip Ganassi Racing	Chevrolet	374	28
17	2	Brad Keselowski	Team Penske	Ford	374	28
18	13	Casey Mears	Germain Racing	Chevrolet	374	26
19	11	Denny Hamlin	Joe Gibbs Racing	Toyota	374	26
20	17	Ricky Stenhouse Jr.	Roush Fenway Racing	Ford	374	24
21	98	Josh Wise	Phil Parsons Racing	Chevrolet	374	23
22	10	Danica Patrick	Stewart–Haas Racing	Chevrolet	374	22
23	51	Justin Allgaier (R)	HScott Motorsports	Chevrolet	372	21
24	43	Aric Almirola	Richard Petty Motorsports	Ford	372	20
25	40	Landon Cassill	Circle Sport	Chevrolet	372	0
26	55	Brian Vickers	Michael Waltrip Racing	Toyota	371	19
27	78	Martin Truex Jr.	Furniture Row Racing	Chevrolet	371	17
28	38	David Gilliland	Front Row Motorsports	Ford	370	16
29	23	Alex Bowman (R)	BK Racing	Toyota	369	15
30	30	Parker Kligerman (R)	Swan Racing	Toyota	369	14
31	41	Kurt Busch	Stewart–Haas Racing	Chevrolet	368	13
32	34	David Ragan	Front Row Motorsports	Ford	367	13
33	32	Travis Kvapil	Go FAS Racing	Ford	367	11
34	66	Joe Nemechek	Identity Ventures Racing	Toyota	366	0
35	22	Joey Logano	Team Penske	Ford	359	10
36	33	David Stremme	Circle Sport	Chevrolet	326	8
37	5	Kasey Kahne	Hendrick Motorsports	Chevrolet	323	8
38	26	Cole Whitt (R)	Swan Racing	Toyota	301	6
39	36	Reed Sorenson	Tommy Baldwin Racing	Chevrolet	289	5
40	83	Ryan Truex (R)	BK Racing	Toyota	274	4
41	27	Paul Menard	Richard Childress Racing	Chevrolet	270	3
42	7	Michael Annett (R)	Tommy Baldwin Racing	Chevrolet	101	2
43	77	Dave Blaney	Randy Humphrey Racing	Ford	65	1
Race Results

=== Race statistics ===
- Lead changes: 22 among different drivers
- Cautions/Laps: 11 for 50
- Red flags: 0
- Time of race: 3 hours, 53 minutes and 37 seconds
- Average speed: 131.211 miles per hour (211.164 km/h)

== Media ==
=== Television ===
Fox Sports
Booth announcers	Pit reporters
Lap-by-lap: Mike Joy; Color-commentator: Larry McReynolds; Color commentator: Darrell Waltrip	Matt Yocum; Steve Byrnes; Krista Voda; Jeff Hammond

=== Radio ===
MRN Radio
Booth announcers	Turn announcers	Pit reporters
Lead announcer: Joe Moore; Announcer: Barney Hall; Announcer: Jeff Striegle	Turns 1 & 2: Dave Moody; Turns 3 & 4: Mike Bagley	Winston Kelly; Steve Post; Alex Hayden; Woody Cain

== Standings after the race ==
Drivers' Championship standings

	Pos	Driver	Points
	1	Jeff Gordon	297
	2	Matt Kenseth	296 (−1)
	3	Carl Edwards	278 (−19)
2	4	Dale Earnhardt Jr.	271 (−26)
2	5	Jimmie Johnson	270 (−27)
1	6	Kyle Busch	269 (−28)
1	7	Brad Keselowski	246 (−51)
4	8	Joey Logano	245 (−52)
2	9	Ryan Newman	236 (−61)
2	10	Austin Dillon (R)	235 (−62)
5	11	Greg Biffle	227 (−70)
2	12	Tony Stewart	224 (−73)
4	13	Brian Vickers	224 (−73)
1	14	Kyle Larson (R)	223 (−74)
2	15	Denny Hamlin	223 (−74)
1	16	Clint Bowyer	219 (−78)

Manufacturers' Championship standings

Pos	Manufacturer	Points
1	Chevrolet	359
2	Ford	342 (−17)
3	Toyota	321 (−38)

- Note: Only the first sixteen positions are included for the driver standings.

Previous race: 2014 Duck Commander 500	Sprint Cup Series; 2014 season	Next race: 2014 Toyota Owners 400
