= 2014 Duck Commander 500 =

Race details
- Race 7 of 36 in the 2014 NASCAR Sprint Cup Series
- Date: April 7, 2014
- Location: Texas Motor Speedway in Fort Worth, Texas
- Course: Permanent racing facility
- Course length: 1.5 miles (2.4 km)
- Distance: 340 laps, 510.000 mi (820.765 km)
- Scheduled distance: 334 laps, 501.000 mi (806.281 km)
- Weather: Partly cloudy with a temperature of 55 °F (13 °C), wind out of the northwest at 10 mph (16 km/h)
- Average speed: 134.191 mph (215.959 km/h)

Pole position
Driver	Tony Stewart	Stewart–Haas Racing
- Time: 27.628

Most laps led
Driver	Joey Logano	Team Penske
- Laps: 108

Winner
No. 22	Joey Logano	Team Penske

Television in the United States
- Network: Fox & PRN
- Announcers: Mike Joy, Darrell Waltrip and Larry McReynolds (Television); Doug Rice and Mark Garrow (Booth); Rob Albright (1 & 2) and Brad Gillie (3 & 4) (Turns) (Radio)
- Nielsen ratings: 2.4/4 (Final); 2.1/4 (Overnight); 3.8 Million viewers

The 2014 Duck Commander 500 was a NASCAR Sprint Cup Series stock car race held on April 7, 2014, at Texas Motor Speedway in Fort Worth, Texas. Contested over 340 laps – extended from 334 laps, due to a green–white–checker finish – on the 1.5 miles (2.4 km) quad-oval, it was the seventh race of the 2014 NASCAR Sprint Cup Series. Joey Logano of Team Penske won the race, while Jeff Gordon finished second and Kyle Busch, Brian Vickers, and the best placed rookie Kyle Larson rounded out the top five. After Larson, the top rookies of the race were Austin Dillon in 21st, and Justin Allgaier in 24th place.

== Previous week's race ==
Kurt Busch took the lead with ten laps to go and held off Jimmie Johnson to end an 83-race winless streak drought, and score his 25th career victory in the STP 500 at Martinsville Speedway. Busch stated that he "didn't know if we'd be able to do it, you know? The 48 car is king here, him or the 24", and that he had "been on this journey for a while and every time you come to Martinsville, you just kind of draw a line through it like there's no way I'll be able to challenge those Hendrick guys or be up in the top 10. This Stewart-Haas team gave me a car to do it." Johnson, who led 296 laps, stated that his car was "so on edge slipping and sliding" and that a "lack of security in our own car kept us from feeling more racy and putting a bumper to someone or really getting inside someone aggressively".

== Report ==
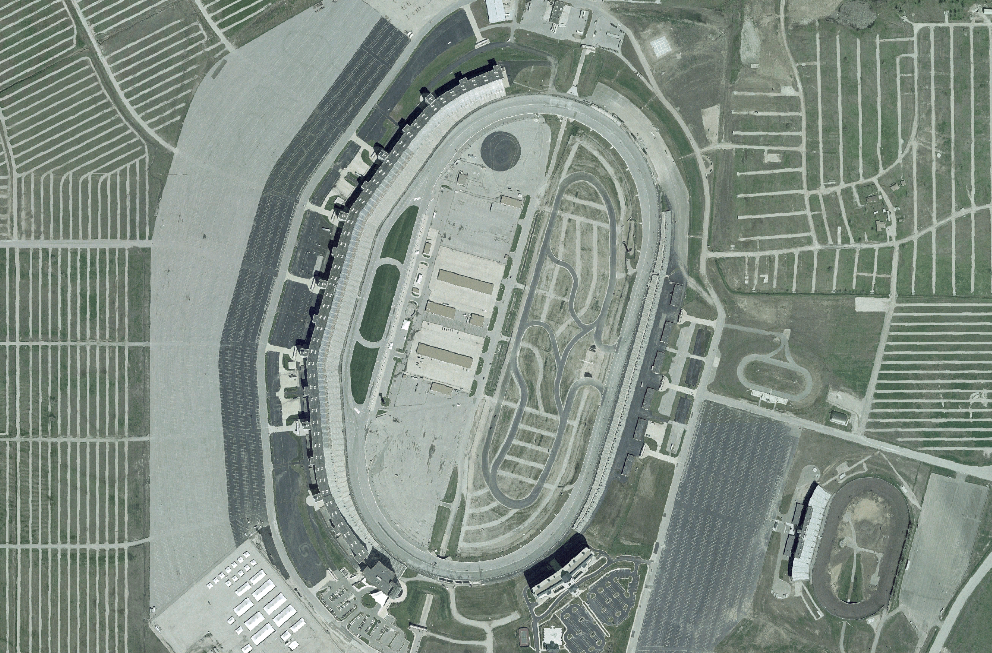
Texas Motor Speedway, the race track where the race was held.

=== Background ===
Texas Motor Speedway is a four-turn quad-oval track that is 1.5 miles (2.4 km) long. The track's turns are banked at twenty-four degrees, while the front stretch, the location of the finish line, is five degrees. The back stretch, opposite of the front, also has a five degree banking. The racetrack has a permanent capacity of 138,122 spectators, and an infield capacity of 53,000. The defending champion from 2013 was Kyle Busch.

=== Entry list ===
The entry list for the Duck Commander 500 was released on Tuesday, April 1 at 10:16 a.m. Eastern time. Forty-six cars were included on the initial list. J. J. Yeley, who wasn't running for points in the Sprint Cup Series, was a post cutoff entry (13 days prior to the race) and wouldn't have received owners points had he made the race which he didn't.

No.	Driver	Team	Manufacturer
1	Jamie McMurray	Chip Ganassi Racing	Chevrolet
2	Brad Keselowski (PC2)	Team Penske	Ford
3	Austin Dillon (R)	Richard Childress Racing	Chevrolet
4	Kevin Harvick	Stewart–Haas Racing	Chevrolet
5	Kasey Kahne	Hendrick Motorsports	Chevrolet
7	Michael Annett (R)	Tommy Baldwin Racing	Chevrolet
9	Marcos Ambrose	Richard Petty Motorsports	Ford
10	Danica Patrick	Stewart–Haas Racing	Chevrolet
11	Denny Hamlin	Joe Gibbs Racing	Toyota
13	Casey Mears	Germain Racing	Chevrolet
14	Tony Stewart (PC3)	Stewart–Haas Racing	Chevrolet
15	Clint Bowyer	Michael Waltrip Racing	Toyota
16	Greg Biffle	Roush Fenway Racing	Ford
17	Ricky Stenhouse Jr.	Roush Fenway Racing	Ford
18	Kyle Busch	Joe Gibbs Racing	Toyota
20	Matt Kenseth (PC5)	Joe Gibbs Racing	Toyota
21	Trevor Bayne (i)	Wood Brothers Racing	Ford
22	Joey Logano	Team Penske	Ford
23	Alex Bowman (R)	BK Racing	Toyota
24	Jeff Gordon (PC6)	Hendrick Motorsports	Chevrolet
26	Cole Whitt (R)	Swan Racing	Toyota
27	Paul Menard	Richard Childress Racing	Chevrolet
30	Parker Kligerman (R)	Swan Racing	Toyota
31	Ryan Newman	Richard Childress Racing	Chevrolet
32	Travis Kvapil	Go FAS Racing	Ford
33	David Stremme	Circle Sport	Chevrolet
34	David Ragan	Front Row Motorsports	Ford
35	David Reutimann	Front Row Motorsports	Ford
36	Reed Sorenson	Tommy Baldwin Racing	Chevrolet
38	David Gilliland	Front Row Motorsports	Ford
40	Landon Cassill (i)	Circle Sport	Chevrolet
41	Kurt Busch (PC4)	Stewart–Haas Racing	Chevrolet
42	Kyle Larson (R)	Chip Ganassi Racing	Chevrolet
43	Aric Almirola	Richard Petty Motorsports	Ford
44	J. J. Yeley (i)	Team XTREME Racing	Chevrolet
47	A. J. Allmendinger	JTG Daugherty Racing	Chevrolet
48	Jimmie Johnson (PC1)	Hendrick Motorsports	Chevrolet
51	Justin Allgaier (R)	HScott Motorsports	Chevrolet
55	Brian Vickers	Michael Waltrip Racing	Toyota
66	Joe Nemechek (i)	Michael Waltrip Racing	Toyota
77	Dave Blaney	Randy Humphrey Racing	Ford
78	Martin Truex Jr.	Furniture Row Racing	Chevrolet
83	Ryan Truex (R)	BK Racing	Toyota
88	Dale Earnhardt Jr.	Hendrick Motorsports	Chevrolet
95	Michael McDowell	Leavine Family Racing	Ford
98	Josh Wise	Phil Parsons Racing	Chevrolet
99	Carl Edwards	Roush Fenway Racing	Ford
Official entry list

Key	Meaning
(R)	Rookie
(i)	Ineligible for points
(PC#)	Past champions provisional

== Practice ==
=== First practice ===
Jimmie Johnson was the fastest in the first practice session with a time of 27.945 and a speed of 193.237 mph (310.985 km/h). During first practice, Kurt Busch cut his left-rear tire and went nose first into the wall in turn 3. This necessitated rolling out his backup car along with David Ragan who went spinning through the infield and destroyed the nose of his car. Because these changes took place before qualifying, neither had to start from the rear.

Pos	No.	Driver	Team	Manufacturer	Time	Speed
1	48	Jimmie Johnson	Hendrick Motorsports	Chevrolet	27.945	193.237
2	16	Greg Biffle	Roush Fenway Racing	Ford	28.117	192.055
3	31	Ryan Newman	Richard Childress Racing	Chevrolet	28.189	191.564
Official first practice results

=== Final practice ===
Kurt Busch was the fastest in the final practice session with a time of 27.745 and a speed of 194.630 mph (313.227 km/h).

Pos	No.	Driver	Team	Manufacturer	Time	Speed
1	41	Kurt Busch	Stewart–Haas Racing	Chevrolet	27.745	194.630
2	99	Carl Edwards	Roush Fenway Racing	Ford	27.747	194.616
3	4	Kevin Harvick	Stewart–Haas Racing	Chevrolet	27.788	194.328
Official final practice results

== Qualifying ==
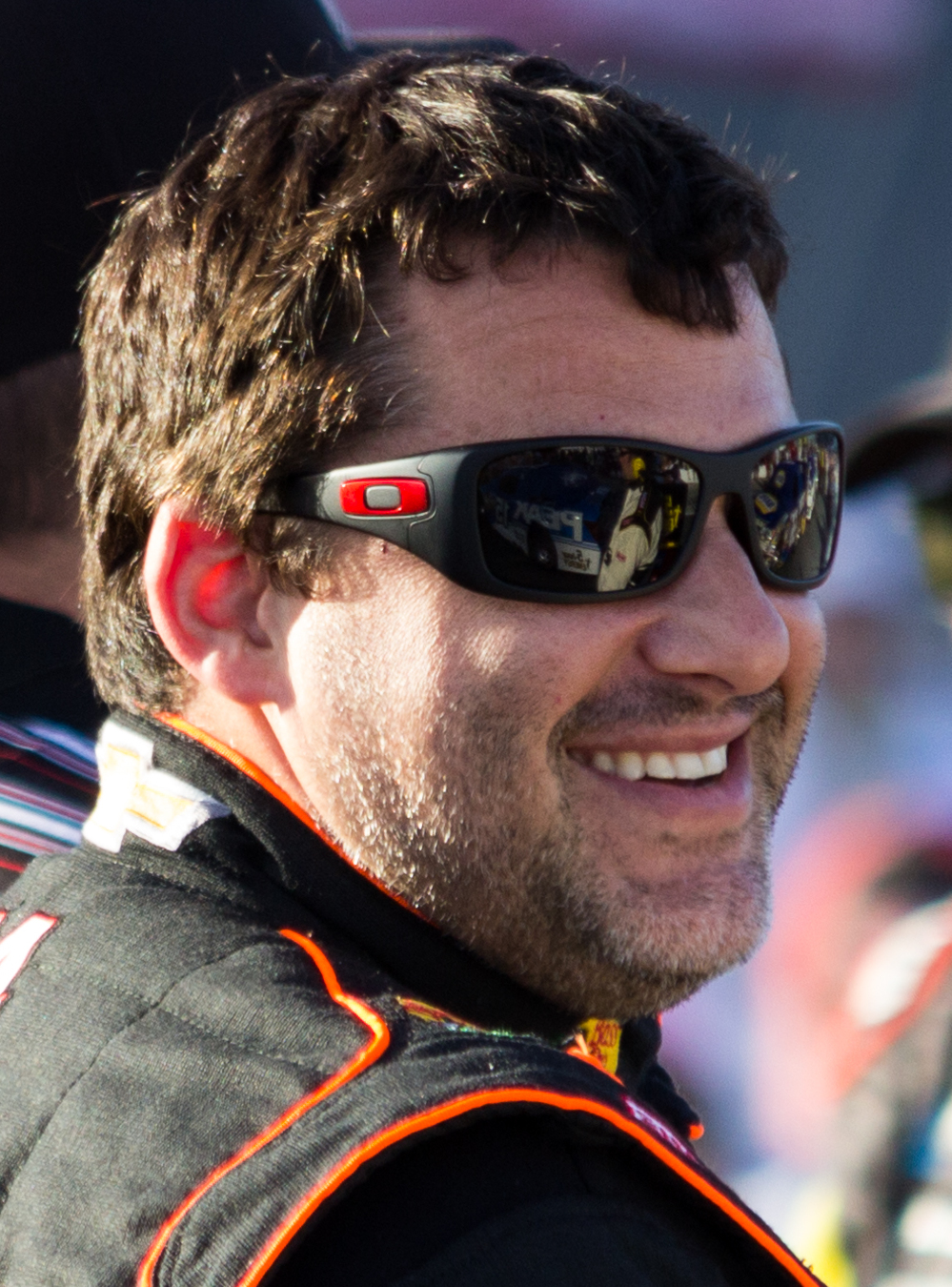
Tony Stewart scored the pole position.

Tony Stewart won the pole with a time of 27.628 and a speed of 195.454 mph (314.553 km/h). Stewart stated that his entire team had "been doing an awesome job", and this his pole position was "the first time I've been able to do something impressive for the team, so I'm excited about that". Brad Keselowski joined Stewart on the front row, expressing that he had "put down a great lap" and that he "didn't see that coming". Four drivers failed to qualify, with Ryan Truex, David Stremme, J. J. Yeley, and Joe Nemechek not making the field.

=== Qualifying results ===
Pos	No.	Driver	Team	Manufacturer	R1	R2	R3
1	14	Tony Stewart	Stewart–Haas Racing	Chevrolet	27.622	27.581	27.628
2	2	Brad Keselowski	Team Penske	Ford	27.574	27.638	27.633
3	4	Kevin Harvick	Stewart–Haas Racing	Chevrolet	27.234	27.593	27.650
4	16	Greg Biffle	Roush Fenway Racing	Ford	27.576	27.518	27.735
5	99	Carl Edwards	Roush Fenway Racing	Ford	27.423	27.705	27.744
6	11	Denny Hamlin	Joe Gibbs Racing	Toyota	27.689	27.792	27.746
7	21	Trevor Bayne	Wood Brothers Racing	Ford	27.345	27.678	27.763
8	31	Ryan Newman	Richard Childress Racing	Chevrolet	27.470	27.714	27.815
9	9	Marcos Ambrose	Richard Petty Motorsports	Ford	27.562	27.796	27.827
10	22	Joey Logano	Team Penske	Ford	27.506	27.640	27.872
11	41	Kurt Busch	Stewart–Haas Racing	Chevrolet	27.474	27.746	27.961
12	24	Jeff Gordon	Hendrick Motorsports	Chevrolet	27.620	27.686	28.112
13	27	Paul Menard	Richard Childress Racing	Chevrolet	27.679	27.798	—
14	42	Kyle Larson (R)	Chip Ganassi Racing	Chevrolet	27.634	27.823	—
15	1	Jamie McMurray	Chip Ganassi Racing	Chevrolet	27.657	27.832	—
16	48	Jimmie Johnson	Hendrick Motorsports	Chevrolet	27.522	27.834	—
17	43	Aric Almirola	Richard Petty Motorsports	Ford	27.629	27.894	—
18	78	Martin Truex Jr.	Furniture Row Racing	Chevrolet	27.530	27.908	—
19	88	Dale Earnhardt Jr.	Hendrick Motorsports	Chevrolet	27.498	27.928	—
20	3	Austin Dillon (R)	Richard Childress Racing	Chevrolet	27.432	27.957	—
21	13	Casey Mears	Germain Racing	Chevrolet	27.624	27.957	—
22	51	Justin Allgaier (R)	HScott Motorsports	Chevrolet	27.656	27.982	—
23	55	Brian Vickers	Michael Waltrip Racing	Toyota	27.651	28.013	—
24	10	Danica Patrick	Stewart–Haas Racing	Chevrolet	27.555	28.014	—
25	15	Clint Bowyer	Michael Waltrip Racing	Toyota	27.694	—	—
26	20	Matt Kenseth	Joe Gibbs Racing	Toyota	27.744	—	—
27	7	Michael Annett (R)	Tommy Baldwin Racing	Chevrolet	27.749	—	—
28	95	Michael McDowell	Leavine Family Racing	Toyota	27.752	—	—
29	18	Kyle Busch	Joe Gibbs Racing	Toyota	27.758	—	—
30	23	Alex Bowman (R)	BK Racing	Toyota	27.770	—	—
31	17	Ricky Stenhouse Jr.	Roush Fenway Racing	Ford	27.772	—	—
32	5	Kasey Kahne	Hendrick Motorsports	Chevrolet	27.831	—	—
33	47	A. J. Allmendinger	JTG Daugherty Racing	Chevrolet	27.891	—	—
34	35	David Reutimann	Front Row Motorsports	Ford	27.986	—	—
35	77	Dave Blaney	Randy Humphrey Racing	Ford	28.049	—	—
36	30	Parker Kligerman (R)	Swan Racing	Toyota	28.093	—	—
37	32	Travis Kvapil	Go FAS Racing	Ford	28.100	—	—
38	36	Reed Sorenson	Tommy Baldwin Racing	Chevrolet	28.162	—	—
39	38	David Gilliland	Front Row Motorsports	Ford	28.180	—	—
40	40	Landon Cassill	Circle Sport	Chevrolet	28.212	—	—
41	98	Josh Wise	Phil Parsons Racing	Chevrolet	28.238	—	—
42	26	Cole Whitt (R)	Swan Racing	Toyota	28.566	—	—
43	34	David Ragan	Front Row Motorsports	Ford	28.748	—	—
Did not qualify
44	33	David Stremme	Circle Sport	Chevrolet	28.308	—	—
45	83	Ryan Truex (R)	BK Racing	Toyota	28.511	—	—
46	66	Joe Nemechek	Identity Ventures Racing	Toyota	28.634	—	—
47	44	J. J. Yeley	Team XTREME Racing	Chevrolet	29.120	—	—
Official qualifying results

== Race ==
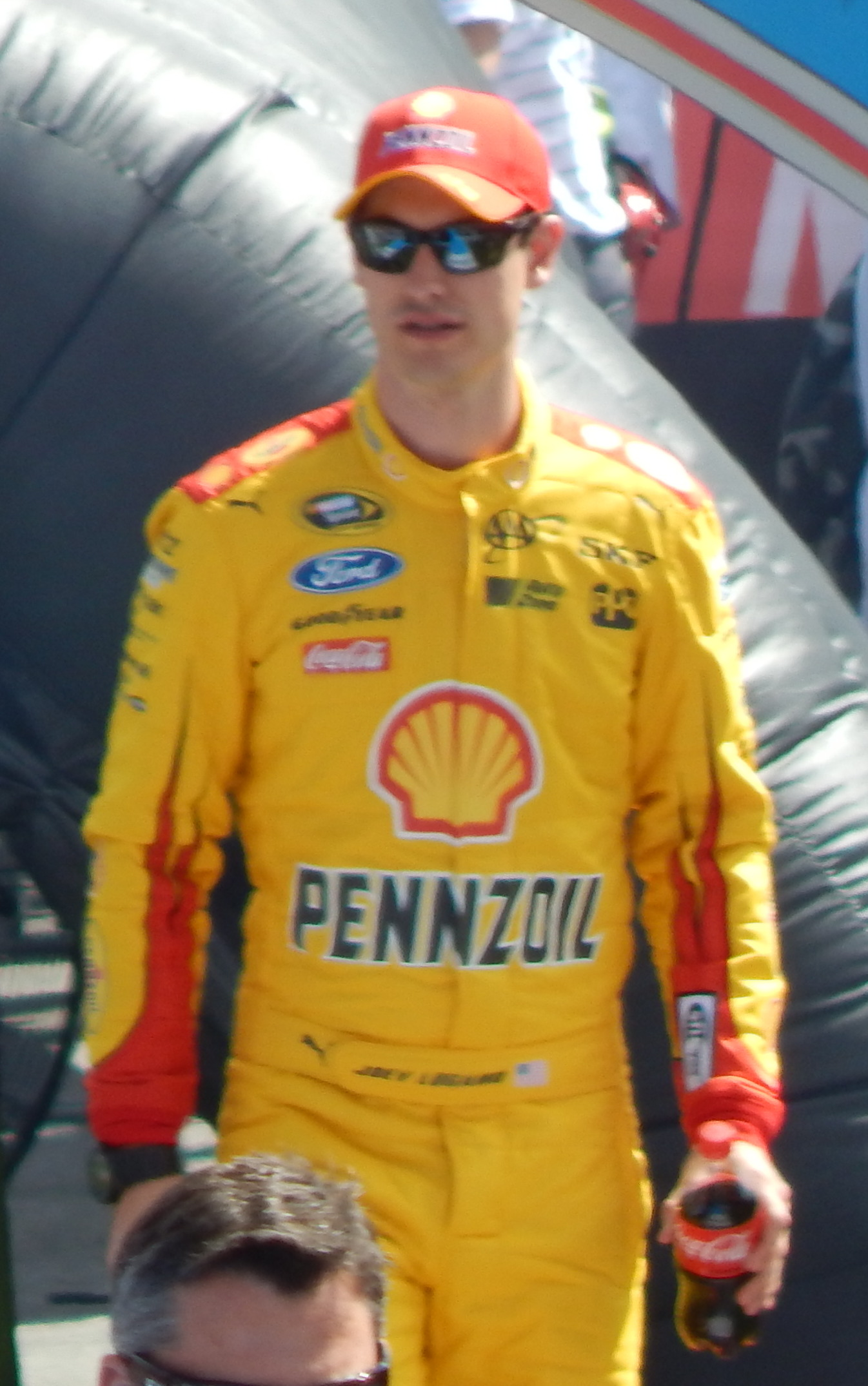
Joey Logano won the race.

The race was scheduled to start at 3:16 p.m. Eastern time, but was delayed by rain. NASCAR subsequently moved the race to Monday, with an expected start time of 12:00 p.m. Eastern time.

The race began under caution at 12:11 p.m. with Tony Stewart leading the field. These were the first laps he led all season. During the caution period, one of the jet dryers on the backstretch caused the hood pins of Brad Keselowski's car to come off, knocking up the hood and subsequently forcing him and Ryan Newman to pit to fix it. Just like a real jet engine, the jet dryers that are used to dry the race track blow hot air at very high pressure. Even though the race was already underway, he and Newman were allowed to retake their original spots in the running order. Clint Bowyer and Kyle Busch also pitted to check out the hoods of their cars.

After ten laps of caution to start the race, the green flag waived with Stewart leading the way. Only two laps later, the second caution of the race flew after points leader Dale Earnhardt Jr. cut through the grass in the tri-oval which was very wet from two days of downpours. The car went straight into the wall hard on fire and came to a stop on the apron in turn 2. “I was following the 43 (Aric Almirola) and just didn’t see the grass,’’ Earnhardt said. “That’s the thing with these cars is you can’t really see good at that angle, so I didn’t have a good visual where the grass was. Just a mistake on my part. I didn’t know I was that close to the grass. I’m disappointed. I don’t like it when I made the mistake there. That’s going to bother me for a while.’’ Jimmie Johnson, who was riding behind his teammate, sustained heavy damage to his nose and caved in the windshield. These cars have a Lexan glass behind the glass windshield to protect the driver.

The race restarted on lap 25. Kevin Harvick led a lap before handing the lead back to his teammate (and owner), but for the fifth straight race, his car had a mechanical failure (engine failure) on lap 29 that took him out of the race.

The third caution of the race flew on lap 49 (competition caution). Reed Sorenson stayed out to lead a lap under the caution before making his stop.

The race restarted on lap 54 with Tony Stewart leading the way.

On lap 71, Stewart became the all-time leader in laps led at Texas Motor Speedway.

Brad Keselowski took the lead on lap 77.

Keselowski surrendered the lead to make his pit stop on lap 97 and handed the lead to Jeff Gordon.

Gordon made his stop on lap 99 and the lead cycled back to Brad.

Denny Hamlin took the lead on lap 122.

Hamlin gave up the lead to pit on lap 141 and Jeff Gordon retook the lead. Denny had to serve a drive-through penalty for speeding on pit road.

Gordon pitted on lap 143 and handed the lead to Kyle Busch. He didn't stay in front for long as Jeff passed him for the lead on lap 153.

The fourth caution of the race flew on lap 176 after Kurt Busch went sliding through the grass on the front stretch trying to slow down to hit pit road.

The race restarted on lap 184. Brad Keselowski edged out Jeff Gordon at the line to take the lead.

The fifth caution of the race flew on lap 219 after Kurt Busch cut down his left-rear tire and spun out in turn 1.

The race restarted on lap 227 and Joey Logano took the lead from his teammate.

Debris on the front stretch brought out the sixth caution with 80 laps to go.

The race restarted with 74 laps to go.

Logano hit pit road with 35 laps to go and handed the lead to Denny Hamlin.

Hamlin ducked onto pit road the next lap and handed the lead to Clint Bowyer.

Bowyer gave up the lead the next lap to pit and Joey Logano cycled back to the lead.

A third cut down left-rear tire from Kurt Busch's car brought out the seventh caution of the race with two laps to go. Jeff Gordon exited pit road as the leader by taking just two right-side tires. Brad Keselowski exited fourth, but was forced to serve a drive-through penalty for speeding on pit road. He would end up finishing 15th.

The race restarted with two laps to go (past its scheduled distance).

Joey Logano passed Jeff Gordon on the final lap to score the victory. "Talk about a lot of emotion," Logano said. "You feel like you are about to win the race and then the caution comes out when you come to take the white and you’re like, ‘You’ve got to be kidding me.'" “That was a great battle,” said Gordon. “At one point I thought we had a shot at it. We got a pretty good restart. Joey was right on me and I was pretty loose in one and two, and I wish I had gone a little bit higher in three and four. But, he got that run off of four and he got in the back of me, and I thought I was going to wreck, so at that point I was like second would be good."

=== Race results ===
Pos	Grid	No.	Driver	Team	Manufacturer	Laps	Points
1	10	22	Joey Logano	Team Penske	Ford	340	48
2	12	24	Jeff Gordon	Hendrick Motorsports	Chevrolet	340	43
3	29	18	Kyle Busch	Joe Gibbs Racing	Toyota	340	42
4	23	55	Brian Vickers	Michael Waltrip Racing	Toyota	340	40
5	14	42	Kyle Larson (R)	Chip Ganassi Racing	Chevrolet	340	39
6	4	16	Greg Biffle	Roush Fenway Racing	Ford	340	38
7	26	20	Matt Kenseth	Joe Gibbs Racing	Toyota	340	37
8	25	15	Clint Bowyer	Michael Waltrip Racing	Toyota	340	37
9	13	27	Paul Menard	Richard Childress Racing	Chevrolet	340	35
10	1	14	Tony Stewart	Stewart–Haas Racing	Chevrolet	340	35
11	32	5	Kasey Kahne	Hendrick Motorsports	Chevrolet	340	33
12	17	43	Aric Almirola	Richard Petty Motorsports	Ford	340	32
13	6	11	Denny Hamlin	Joe Gibbs Racing	Toyota	340	32
14	5	99	Carl Edwards	Roush Fenway Racing	Ford	340	30
15	2	2	Brad Keselowski	Team Penske	Ford	340	30
16	8	31	Ryan Newman	Richard Childress Racing	Chevrolet	340	28
17	15	1	Jamie McMurray	Chip Ganassi Racing	Chevrolet	340	27
18	18	78	Martin Truex Jr.	Furniture Row Racing	Chevrolet	340	26
19	7	21	Trevor Bayne	Wood Brothers Racing	Ford	339	0
20	9	9	Marcos Ambrose	Richard Petty Motorsports	Ford	339	24
21	20	3	Austin Dillon (R)	Richard Childress Racing	Chevrolet	339	23
22	39	38	David Gilliland	Front Row Motorsports	Ford	339	22
23	33	47	A. J. Allmendinger	JTG Daugherty Racing	Chevrolet	339	21
24	22	51	Justin Allgaier (R)	HScott Motorsports	Chevrolet	339	20
25	16	48	Jimmie Johnson	Hendrick Motorsports	Chevrolet	338	19
26	31	17	Ricky Stenhouse Jr.	Roush Fenway Racing	Ford	338	18
27	24	10	Danica Patrick	Stewart–Haas Racing	Chevrolet	338	17
28	21	13	Casey Mears	Germain Racing	Chevrolet	338	16
29	27	7	Michael Annett (R)	Tommy Baldwin Racing	Chevrolet	337	15
30	28	95	Michael McDowell	Leavine Family Racing	Ford	335	14
31	42	26	Cole Whitt (R)	Swan Racing	Toyota	335	13
32	30	23	Alex Bowman (R)	BK Racing	Toyota	335	12
33	38	36	Reed Sorenson	Tommy Baldwin Racing	Chevrolet	334	12
34	40	40	Landon Cassill	Circle Sport	Chevrolet	334	0
35	43	34	David Ragan	Front Row Motorsports	Ford	334	9
36	41	98	Josh Wise	Phil Parsons Racing	Chevrolet	333	8
37	37	32	Travis Kvapil	Go FAS Racing	Ford	332	7
38	34	35	David Reutimann	Front Row Motorsports	Ford	332	6
39	11	41	Kurt Busch	Stewart–Haas Racing	Chevrolet	327	5
40	36	30	Parker Kligerman (R)	Swan Racing	Toyota	313	4
41	35	77	Dave Blaney	Humphrey Racing	Ford	272	3
42	3	4	Kevin Harvick	Stewart–Haas Racing	Chevrolet	28	3
43	19	88	Dale Earnhardt Jr.	Hendrick Motorsports	Chevrolet	12	1
Race Results

=== Race statistics ===
- Lead changes: 18 among nine drivers
- Cautions/Laps: 7 for 49
- Red flags: 0
- Time of race: 3 hours, 48 minutes, and 2 seconds
- Average speed: 134.191 miles per hour (215.959 km/h)

== Media ==
=== Television ===
Fox Sports
Booth announcers	Pit reporters
Lap-by-lap: Mike Joy; Color-commentator: Larry McReynolds; Color commentator: Darrell Waltrip	Matt Yocum; Steve Byrnes; Krista Voda; Jeff Hammond

=== Radio ===
PRN Radio
Booth announcers	Turn announcers	Pit reporters
Lead announcer: Doug Rice; Announcer: Mark Garrow	Turns 1 & 2: Rob Albright; Turns 3 & 4: Brad Gillie	Brett McMillan; Steve Richards; Wendy Venturini; Pat Patterson

== Standings after the race ==
Drivers' Championship standings

	Pos	Driver	Points
3	1	Jeff Gordon	259
	2	Matt Kenseth	255 (−4)
	3	Carl Edwards	247 (−12)
4	4	Joey Logano	235 (−24)
1	5	Kyle Busch	231 (−28)
5	6	Dale Earnhardt Jr.	228 (−31)
2	7	Jimmie Johnson	228 (−31)
1	8	Brad Keselowski	218 (−41)
4	9	Brian Vickers	205 (−54)
1	10	Paul Menard	203 (−56)
1	11	Ryan Newman	202 (−57)
3	12	Austin Dillon (R)	202 (−57)
1	13	Denny Hamlin	197 (−62)
1	14	Tony Stewart	189 (−70)
4	15	Kyle Larson (R)	187 (−72)
2	16	Greg Biffle	187 (−72)

Manufacturers' Championship standings

Pos	Manufacturer	Points
1	Chevrolet	311
2	Ford	302 (−9)
3	Toyota	280 (−31)

- Note: Only the first sixteen positions are included for the driver standings.

Previous race: 2014 STP 500	Sprint Cup Series; 2014 season	Next race: 2014 Bojangles' Southern 500
