= 2018 Super DIRTcar Series =

The 2018 Super DIRTcar Series is the 46th season of Big Block Modified racing sanctioned by DIRTcar Northeast & World Racing Group. The season will begin with the DIRTcar Nationals at Volusia Speedway Park on February 12 (featuring 5 non-points races) while the first points scoring race of the season will be the Highbank Holdup at Can-Am Speedway on April 13 The season will end with the Can-Am World of Outlaws World Finals at The Dirt Track at Charlotte on November 9. Matt Sheppard enters the 2019 season as the defending series champion.

The 2019 season will continue to feature qualifier races for NAPA Auto Parts Super DIRT Week. Any qualifier race winner will have a guaranteed provisional starting spot in the 200 lap event at Oswego Speedway on October 13.

== Team & Driver Chart ==
No.	Race Driver	Car Owner / Entrant	Chassis	Rounds
1	Billy Pauch	Pauch Racing	Bicknell	-
1G	Darwin Greene			-
1J	Rocky Warner	Jake Spraker Racing		1
1x	Willy Decker			3
1z	Jessica Friesen	Halmar Racing Team	DKM-Bicknell	1
2	Jack Lehner		Teo-Bicknell	1
2L	Jack Lehner		Teo-Bicknell	1
2RJ	Ronnie Johnson		Bicknell	1
3	Justin Haers	Haers Brothers Racing	Bicknell	-
3D	Matt DeLorenzo			1
3G	Brian Gleason			1
3J	Marc Johnson			1
49	Billy Dunn	Graham Racing	Teo	2
4	Billy VanInwegen			-
4	Andy Bachetti			1
5	Ryan Godown	Dieter Schmidt	Troyer TD4	-
5h	Chris Hile	Hile Motorsports	Bicknell	2
5s	Tyler Siri	Siri Racing		-
6d	Dillon Steuer			-
6h	Max McLaughlin	HBR Racing	Teo	3
6h	Josh Horenforst			1
6JH	Josh Horenforst			1
88	Mat Williamson	Buzz Chew Racing	Bicknell	2
7	Rick Laubach	Gary & Lori Hermann	Teo	-
7F	Matt Farnham			2
8	Rich Scagliotta			3
8R	Rob Bellinger			1
9	Ryan Watt	Jeff Brown		-
9s	Matt Sheppard	Matt Sheppard Racing	Bicknell	3
9x	Tyler Trump			1
00	Bobby Varin			2
00T	Lou Torres			1
02	Roy Bresnahan			2
07	Tim Kerr			2
10J	Jim Nagle			1
11J	James Sweeting			1
13	Rick Regalski	Regalski Racing	Bicknell	-
14	C.G. Morey			1
14j	Alan Johnson			1
16b	Alan Barker			1
17	Kyle Sheldon	Elmo Reckner	Bicknell	-
17K	Brian Krummel			1
18	Bodie Bellinger			1
18J	Louie Jackson Jr.			1
18JR	Louie Jackson Jr.			2
19	Tim Fuller			3
19k	Brett Kressley	Brett Kressley Racing	Bicknell	-
19m	Jessey Mueller	Mueller Motorsports		1
20	Brett Hearn	Madsen Motorsports	Teo	3
21	Yan Bussiere	YB Racing		1
21a	Peter Britten		Troyer	2
21J	Ryan Jordan			1
23	Kyle Coffey			2
24	Jim Wilko			1
25	Erick Rudolph	Randy Chrysler 21K Racing	Bicknell	1
25H	Katelyn Hile	Hile Motorsports	Bicknell	1
25J	Chad Jesso			1
25R	Erick Rudolph	Randy Chrysler 21K Racing	Bicknell	2
27J	Danny Johnson	Graham Racing		3
28p	Eldon Payne Jr.	Paynes Motorsports	Bicknell	1
30	Jamie Mills			-
30M	Joseph Watson			-
32	Jim Rasey			-
34	Andrew Ferguson			1
35	Francois Bellemare			-
36	Kenny Wallace	Willy & Becky Auchmoody		1
38	Tim Harris		Hig Fab	1
39	Tim McCreadie	Sweeteners Plus / CME	Bicknell	1
42	Matt Pupello			1
42p	Pat Ward	Gypsum Racing	Bicknell	3
43	Jimmy Horton	Halmar Racing Team	DKM	-
43	Keith Flach			2
44	Anthony Perrego			1
44	Stewart Friesen	Halmar Racing Team	DKM-Bicknell	1
44F	Stewart Friesen	Halmar Racing Team	DKM-Bicknell	1
44R	Russell Morseman	Morseman Racing	Bicknell	-
46	Jeremy Smith	Jeremy Smith Racing	Bicknell	-
48t	Dave Rauscher	Rauscher Racing		3
62	Tom Sears Jr.	Sears Racing	Bicknell	1
63	Adam Roberts	SNR Motorsports	Bicknell	3
65	Scott Hitchens			-
66X	Casey Terrance			1
73	Kevin Poitras		Bicknell	-
74	J.R. Heffner	J.R. Heffner Racing		-
83x	Tim Sears Jr.	Sears Racing	Bicknell	1
84	Gary Tomkins			2
85	H.J. Bunting			-
35	Mike Mahaney		Bicknell	3
91	Billy Decker	Jeremy Smith Racing	Bicknell	-
91	Billy Decker	Gypsum Racing	Bicknell	3
93	Danny Varin			3
96	Jean-Francois Corriveau			3
97G	Ryan Godown			1
97K	Kris Vermold			1
98h	Jimmy Phelps	HBR Racing	Teo-Bicknell	3
99L	Larry Wight	Gypsum Racing	Bicknell	2
109	Billy Whittaker		Bicknell	2
111	Demetrios Drellos			1
115	Kenny Tremont			1
118	Jim Britt	Jim Britt Racing		-
165	Rex King			-
816	Jeff Rockefeller			1
B16	Alan Barker			2
cb3	Chad Brachmann	Brachmann Racing		-
R2	Rusty Smith			3
R13	Ralph McBride			-
X	Chad Phelps			1
Z	Butch Tittle			3

=== Driver & Team Changes ===
- - HBR Racing (Max McLaughlin & Jimmy Phelps) will chase the Super DIRTcar Series championship once again in 2019. Max will compete part time due to his full time Nascae K&N Pro Series Ride.
- - Peter Britten has left Graham Racing to chase the points championship in the Super DIRTcar Series alone.
- - Billy Decker will return to Gypsum Racing for the 2019 season starting at the points season opener at Can Am.
- - Stewart Friesen and the Halmar Friesen Racing team will only run in select races that don't conflict with Friesen's NASCAR Camping World Truck Series schedule.
- - Tim McCreadie will only run in select races that don't conflict with McCreadie's dirt late model schedule this year he will only run the unsanctioned Eastern States 200 at Orange County Fair Speedway.
- - Mat Williamson has teamed up with Buzz Chew Racing to bring home the 2019 Super Dirtcar Series title driving the Buzzchew Chevy number 88 machine

== Schedule ==
FloRacing will broadcast 20 nights of racing with live video online (12 regular season races, Super DIRT Week & the BBM portion of World Finals). DIRTvision.com will broadcast all races with live radio coverage, and will have live video for the Volusia races. MavTV will broadcast select races (Volusia, Weedsport, Oswego + others) on tape delay, in partnership with Speed Sport.

No.	Date	Race title	Track	TV/Stream
≠	February 13	DIRTcar Nationals	Volusia Speedway Park, Barberville, Florida	DIRTvision.com MavTV
≠	February 14	DIRTcar Nationals	Volusia Speedway Park, Barberville, Florida	DIRTvision.com MavTV
≈	February 15	DIRTcar Nationals	Volusia Speedway Park, Barberville, Florida	DIRTvision.com MavTV
≈	February 15	DIRTcar Nationals	Volusia Speedway Park, Barberville, Florida	DIRTvision.com MavTV
≈	February 16	DIRTcar Nationals	Volusia Speedway Park, Barberville, Florida	DIRTvision.com MavTV
≈	February 17	DIRTcar Nationals	Volusia Speedway Park, Barberville, Florida	DIRTvision.com MavTV
≠	April 28	High Bank Holdup	Fulton Speedway, Fulton, New York	
≠	May 16	Battle at the Bridge	Bridgeport Speedway, Bridgeport, New Jersey	
1	May 28	Heroes Remembered 100	Weedsport Speedway, Weedsport, New York	FloRacing MavTV
2	June 15		Brewerton Speedway, Brewerton, New York	
3	June 26	The BIG Show 10	Albany-Saratoga Speedway, Malta, New York	
4	July 1		Cornwall Motor Speedway, Cornwall, Ontario, Canada	
5	July 5		Land of Legends Raceway, Canandaigua, New York	FloRacing
6	July 8	Freedom Fighter 100	Utica-Rome Speedway, Vernon, New York	FloRacing
7	July 10		Outlaw Speedway, Dundee, New York	FloRacing
8	July 17	TBA	TBA	FloRacing
9	July 19	Battle on the Midway	Orange County Fair Speedway, Middletown, New York	FloRacing
10	July 23		Autodrome Granby, Granby, Quebec, Canada	FloRacing
11	July 24	Racing Stock 100	Autodrome Drummond, Drummondville, Quebec, Canada	
12	July 28	Hall of Fame 100	Weedsport Speedway, Weedsport, New York	MavTV FloRacing
13	July 31	Battle of Plattsburgh 100	Airborne Park Speedway, Plattsburgh, New York	
14	August 1	Jack Johnson Tribute	Fonda Speedway, Fonda, New York	FloRacing
15	August 6	Bob St. Amand Sr. Memorial	Merrittville Speedway, Thorold, Ontario, Canada	
16	August 7	Summer Nationals	Ransomville Speedway, Ransomville, New York	FloRacing
17	September 1	Mr. DIRT Track USA	Lebanon Valley Speedway, West Lebanon, New York	FloRacing
18	September 3	Labor Day Double Play 100	Weedsport Speedway, Weedsport, New York	MavTV FloRacing
19	September 7		Le RPM Speedway, Saint-Marcel-de-Richelieu, Quebec, Canada	
20	September 8	Blackout Race	Autodrome Drummond, Drummondville, Quebec, Canada	
21	September 14	Duel at the Demon	Brewerton Speedway, Brewerton, New York	
22	September 15	Mohawk 100	Mohawk International Raceway, Akwesasne, New York	
23	September 22	Thunder Along the Mohawk	Fonda Speedway, Fonda, New York	FloRacing
≈	October 3	NAPA Auto Parts Super DIRT Week XLVII	Oswego Speedway, Oswego, New York	FloRacing MavTV
≈	October 4	NAPA Auto Parts Super DIRT Week XLVII	Oswego Speedway, Oswego, New York	FloRacing MavTV
≈	October 5	NAPA Auto Parts Super DIRT Week XLVII	Oswego Speedway, Oswego, New York	FloRacing MavTV
≈	October 6	NAPA Auto Parts Super DIRT Week XLVII	Oswego Speedway, Oswego, New York	FloRacing MavTV
24	October 7	NAPA Auto Parts Super DIRT Week XLVII	Oswego Speedway, Oswego, New York	FloRacing MavTV
25	October 12	The Loud & Dirty Northeast Fall Nationals	Brockville Ontario Speedway, Brockville, Ontario, Canada	
≈	November 1	Textron Off Road World of Outlaws World Finals	The Dirt Track at Charlotte Motor Speedway, Concord, North Carolina	FloRacing
26	November 2	Textron Off Road World of Outlaws World Finals	The Dirt Track at Charlotte Motor Speedway, Concord, North Carolina	FloRacing
27	November 3	Textron Off Road World of Outlaws World Finals	The Dirt Track at Charlotte Motor Speedway, Concord, North Carolina	FloRacing

NAPA Auto Parts Super DIRT Week Qualifier Race
- - ≠ will state if the race was postponed or canceled
- - ≈ will state if the race is not for championship points

=== Schedule notes and changes ===
- - the races at Eldora Speedway, and Sharon Speedway won't return in 2018 as Eldora has selected a new division to support the NASCAR Camping World Truck Series event.
- - night #1 of DIRTcar Nationals at Volusia Speedway Park (February 13) was canceled due to weather conditions.
- - night #2 of DIRTcar Nationals at Volusia Speedway Park (February 14) was postponed to February 15 due to fog.
- - the Highbank Holdup at Fulton Speedway (April 28) was canceled due to weather conditions.
- - the Battle at the Bridge at Bridgeport Speedway (May 16) was canceled due to weather conditions.
- - SDS series officials announced on June 1 that the series will return to Orange County Fair Speedway for the first time since 2014 on July 19. The race will be called "The Battle on the Midway" and will be a NAPA Auto Parts Super DIRT Week qualifier race. The race will be $10k to win as well.

== Results and standings ==
=== Races ===
No.	Race / Track	Winning driver	Winning team	Last Chance Showdown winner	Fastest Qualifier
≈	DIRTcar Nationals (Night #3 / Race #1)	Tyler Siri	Siri Racing	Matt Sheppard	Stewart Friesen
≈	DIRTcar Nationals (Night #3 / Race #1)	Tyler Siri	Siri Racing	Matt Sheppard	Jimmy Horton
≈	DIRTcar Nationals (Night #3 / Race #1)	Tyler Siri	Siri Racing	Ryan Godown	Rick Laubach
≈	DIRTcar Nationals (Night #3 / Race #1)	Tyler Siri	Siri Racing	Ryan Godown	Tyler Siri
≈	DIRTcar Nationals (Night #3 / Race #2)	Tim McCreadie	Sweeteners Plus / CME	Brett Kressley	Billy Pauch
≈	DIRTcar Nationals (Night #3 / Race #2)	Tim McCreadie	Sweeteners Plus / CME	Brett Kressley	Tim McCreadie
≈	DIRTcar Nationals (Night #3 / Race #2)	Tim McCreadie	Sweeteners Plus / CME	Ryan Godown	Justin Haers
≈	DIRTcar Nationals (Night #3 / Race #2)	Tim McCreadie	Sweeteners Plus / CME	Ryan Godown	Stewart Friesen
≈	DIRTcar Nationals (Night #4)	Matt Sheppard	Matt Sheppard Racing	Jimmy Phelps	Danny Johnson
≈	DIRTcar Nationals (Night #4)	Matt Sheppard	Matt Sheppard Racing	Jimmy Phelps	Ryan Godown
≈	DIRTcar Nationals (Night #4)	Matt Sheppard	Matt Sheppard Racing	Tyler Siri	Max McLaughlin
≈	DIRTcar Nationals (Night #4)	Matt Sheppard	Matt Sheppard Racing	Tyler Siri	Jimmy Horton
≈	DIRTcar Nationals (Night #5)	Tim McCreadie	Sweeteners Plus / CME	Jimmy Phelps	Stewart Friesen
≈	DIRTcar Nationals (Night #5)	Tim McCreadie	Sweeteners Plus / CME	Jimmy Phelps	Mike Mahaney
≈	DIRTcar Nationals (Night #5)	Tim McCreadie	Sweeteners Plus / CME	Larry Wight	Billy VanInwegen
≈	DIRTcar Nationals (Night #5)	Tim McCreadie	Sweeteners Plus / CME	Larry Wight	Max McLaughlin
1	Heroes Remembered 100	Stewart Friesen	Halmar Racing Team	Adam Roberts	Stewart Friesen
1	Heroes Remembered 100	Stewart Friesen	Halmar Racing Team	Adam Roberts	Billy Dunn
1	Heroes Remembered 100	Stewart Friesen	Halmar Racing Team	Mat Williamson	Matt Sheppard
1	Heroes Remembered 100	Stewart Friesen	Halmar Racing Team	Mat Williamson	Larry Wight
2	Brewerton	Matt Sheppard	Matt Sheppard Racing	Andrew Ferguson	Pat Ward
2	Brewerton	Matt Sheppard	Matt Sheppard Racing	Andrew Ferguson	Billy Decker
2	Brewerton	Matt Sheppard	Matt Sheppard Racing	Rob Bellinger	Matt Sheppard
2	Brewerton	Matt Sheppard	Matt Sheppard Racing	Rob Bellinger	Tim Sears Jr,
3	Brett Hearn's Big Show X	Stewart Friesen	Halmar Racing Team	Tim McCreadie	Tim Fuller
3	Brett Hearn's Big Show X	Stewart Friesen	Halmar Racing Team	Tim McCreadie	Peter Britten
3	Brett Hearn's Big Show X	Stewart Friesen	Halmar Racing Team	Tim McCreadie	Stewart Friesen
3	Brett Hearn's Big Show X	Stewart Friesen	Halmar Racing Team	Erick Rudolph	Willy Decker
3	Brett Hearn's Big Show X	Stewart Friesen	Halmar Racing Team	Erick Rudolph	Jessey Mueller

== See also ==
- - 2018 World of Outlaws Craftsman Sprint Car Series
- - 2018 World of Outlaws Craftsman Late Model Series
