= Tim Fuller (racing driver) =

American Dirt Modified racing driver (born 1967)

- Born: Timothy W. Fuller; October 28, 1967 (age 59) Watertown, New York, U.S.

Modified racing career
- Debut season: 1990 Can-Am Speedway
- Car number: 19
- Championships: 15
- Wins: 251

Previous series
- 1988-1989 Wins 2007-2014 Wins: Pure stock 24; Late model 24

Championship titles
- 2005 Mr. Dirt Super Series Champion; 1993, 2003 Mr. Dirt 358 Modified Champion

Awards
- 2007 World of Outlaws Late Model; Rookie of the Year
- Statistics up to date as of August 31, 2026.

Timothy Fuller (born October 27, 1967) is an American Dirt Modified and Late Model racing driver. Fuller has 285 feature events wins from 45 tracks in 14 states, two Canadian provinces and Australia.

== Racing career ==
Fuller began racing in 1988 in the pure stock class at the Can-Am Speedway in LaFargeville, New York. Since progressing to the Modified division, he has competed and been victorious at the east coast race tracks from Florida to Canada, including Brewerton Speedway, Fonda Speedway, Frogtown Speedway near Hogansburg, Utica-Rome Speedway in Vernon, and Weedsport Speedway, all in New York; Brockville Speedway and Cornwall Motor Speedway in Ontario; Hagerstown Speedway, Maryland; Bridgeport Speedway, New Jersey; Lernerville Speedway, Pennsylvania; and Volusia Speedway Park in Florida.

Fuller won the Super Dirt Week main event in 2004 at the Syracuse Mile, and won the companion 358 modified title twice, first in 2005 at Syracuse, and then in 2016 at the Oswego Speedway. He claimed the Mr. DIRT overall Modified crown in 2005.

In 2007, Fuller turned his attention to the Late Model cars claiming the World of Outlaw Rookie of the Year, and winning at least 19 class events over the succeeding years.

Fuller was inducted into the Northeast Dirt Modified Hall of Fame in 2023.
