= Jimmy Phelps =

American racing driver (born 1975)

- Born: James D. Phelps; April 5, 1975 (age 51) Baldwinsville, New York

Modified racing career
- Debut season: 1994
- Car number: 98H, 99J
- Championships: 16
- Wins: 151

Previous series
- 1991-1993: 4 cylinder

Championship titles
- 2022 DIRTcar Nationals SDS Big Block Modified Champion; 2007 Mr. DIRTcar (Central Region)
- Statistics up to date as of November 13, 2026.

Jimmy Phelps (born April 1, 1975) is an American professional dirt modified racing driver.

== Racing career ==
Jimmy Phelps began his racing career in the 4-cylinder division in 1991, advancing up the racing ladder in to claim the Fulton Speedway sportsman-modified class championship in 1994 and the 358-Modified title in 1995 at Brewerton Speedway, both in New York.

Phelps captured his first big-block-modified crown at Fulton Speedway in 1999, and all total has collected 16 track championships across Central New York, including three each at Weedsport Speedway and Rolling Wheels Raceway.

Phelps has competed successfully at east coast venues from Florida to Canada including Sharon Speedway, Hartford, Ohio; Williams Grove Speedway, Mechanicsburg, Pennsylvania; in Ontario at Cornwall Motor Speedway and Merrittville Speedway (Thorold); Autodrome Drummond, Quebec; Charlotte Motor Speedway, North Carolina; Volusia Speedway Park, Barberville, Florida; and in New York at Fonda Speedway and Mohawk International Raceway (Hogansburg). Phelps captured the 2015 Super Dirt Week 358-modifed event the final year it was held at the Syracuse Mile.

== Race promoter ==
In 2013 Phelps’ car owner, Al Heinke, purchased the Weedsport Speedway and appointed Phelps as promoter. They have since continued to upgrade, expand, and improve the track, with new seating, new clay, a new midway, and expanded pits, among other things.
