= Dave Lape =

American racing driver (born 1947)

- Born: David W. Lape; January 13, 1947 Amsterdam, New York
- Died: September 7, 2022 (aged 75)
- Retired: 2013
- Debut season: 1964

Modified racing career
- Car number: 22
- Championships: 13
- Wins: 191

Championship titles
- 1977 Mr. Dirt Champion; 1982 Super DIRT Series Champion

David Lape (January 13, 1947 – September 7, 2022) was an American dirt modified racing driver, fabricator, and promoter. His cars always carried the number 22 adorned with 13-point flames as a tribute to his childhood mentor, car owner Bob Whitbeck and his driver Pete Corey.

== Racing career ==
Lape began his stock car career campaigning a Modified Sportsman at age 16 in 1964 at the Victoria Speedway near Schenectady, New York. It took Lape five years to win his first feature, but he then went on to win 191 main events at the renown tracks of the New York, including Canandaigua Speedway, Orange County Fair Speedway in Middletown, the Syracuse Mile, Ransomville Speedway, and Rolling Wheels Raceway in Elbridge, along with the Devil's Bowl Speedway in West Haven, Vermont. Also in New York, Lape captured the track championship at Fonda Speedway seven times, and also captured three points titles at Weedsport Speedway, two at Utica-Rome Speedway in Vernon, and one at Albany-Saratoga Speedway in Malta.

Always a trailblazer, Lape operated Champ Car Fabrications from 1983 to 1996, building winning cars for himself and others. From 1988 to 2000, he and attorney Andy Fusco teamed up to promote races around the Northeast.

Lape was inducted into the Eastern Motorsports Press Association, the Northeast Dirt Modified and the New York State Stock Car Association Halls of Fame.
