= Doug Carlyle =

Canadian Dirt Modified racing driver (1954 - 2017)

Doug (The Ox) Carlyle
- Born: Douglas Ford Carlyle; May 22, 1954 Kingston, Ontario, Canada
- Died: January 16, 2017 (aged 62)

Modified racing career
- Years active: 1972 - 1993
- Car number: 11
- Championships: 11

Championship titles
- 1986 Mr. Dirt 358 Modified Champion

Douglas Carlyle (May 22, 1954 – January 16, 2017) was a Canadian dirt modified racing driver. He competed successfully at race venues on either side of the St. Lawrence River, including Brockville Ontario Speedway; Grandview Speedway in Bechtelsville, Pennsylvania; Fonda Speedway, New York; and Rolling Wheels Raceway in Elbridge, New York.

== Racing career ==
Doug Carlyle started racing small block modifieds in 1973 at age 18 at the Kingston (Ontario) and Watertown (New York) Speedways. He won his first feature a year later at Kingston, and in 1976 was crowned the speedway's final track champion.

Carlyle also claimed four track championships at Cornwall Motor Speedway, Ontario, and three at Can-Am Speedway in LaFargeville, New York. After a short sabbatical he returned to racing in 1990 to claim three track championships at Frogtown International Speedway in Hogansburg, New York, before a second retirement in 1993.

The 1986 Mr. Dirt 320/358 Modified Champion, Carlyle was inducted into the Northeast Dirt Modified Hall of Fame in 2004.
