= Mat Williamson =

Canadian racing driver (born 1990)

- Born: March 16, 1990 (age 36) St. Catharines, Ontario

Modified racing career
- Debut season: 2003
- Car number: 3, 6, 88
- Championships: 15
- Wins: 297

Previous series
- 1995-2000: Kart racing

Championship titles
- 2019, 2024, 2025 Super DIRTcar Series Champion; 2025 DIRTcar Modified Weekly Champion; 2023, 2025, 2026 DIRTcar 358-Modified Series championship 2019, 2020, 2021, 2022 DIRTcar 358-Modified Weekly Champion; 2023, 2024, 2026 DIRTcar Nationals SDS Big Block Modified Champion

Awards
- 2019, 2024 EMPA North East Driver of the Year
- Statistics up to date as of November 17, 2026.

Mat Williamson (born March 16, 1990) is a Canadian professional dirt modified racing driver.

== Racing career ==
Mat Williamson began racing go-karts it at age 5 but had turned his attention to hockey by age 10. Williamson soon returned to racing, and at age 15 won his first feature event in the sportsman-modified division at Merrittville Speedway in Thorold, Ontario. Four years late he captured his first win in the 358-modified division and began expanding his racing to compete with the big-block modifieds on the U.S. side of the border.

Williamson has since been successful at 38 tracks along the east coast from Florida to Quebec including Brockville Ontario Speedway, Canada, Weedsport Speedway in New York, and Devil's Bowl Speedway in West Haven, Vermont. Williamson has added four big-block-modified and three 358-modified Super Dirt Week victories at Oswego Speedway.

As of 2026 Williamson has captured 15 track championships including 6 at the Ransomville Speedway in New York, 4 at the Lernerville Speedway in Sarver, Pennsylvania, and 2 at the Merrittville Speedway.

== Personal life ==
Randy Williamson, Mat's father, with Pete Bicknell co-founded Bicknell Racing Products, a prominent Canadian manufacturer of race car chassis and parts. Randy Williamson was honored with the Northeast Dirt Modified Hall of Fame's Engineer Award in 2023, and inducted into the Canadian Motorsport Hall of Fame in 2026.
