= Danny O'Brien (racing driver) =

Canadian Dirt Modified racing driver (born 1967)

Danny O’Brien
- Born: December 27, 1967 (age 58) Kingston, Ontario, Canada
- Debut season: 1987 Brockville Speedway

Modified racing career
- Car number: 17D
- Championships: 18
- Wins: 226
- Finished last season: 2023

Championship titles
- 2009 Mr. Dirt 358 (Northern Region) Lucas Oil Canadian Dirt Series, Ogilvie Triple Crown Series, Doiron Engineering Cup, Mohawk Memorial Cup
- Statistics up to date as of July 7, 2023.

Danny O’Brien (born December 24, 1967) is a Canadian Dirt Modified racing driver. He is credited with 226 career wins at 11 tracks in two countries.

== Racing career ==
Danny O’Brien began racing in 1987 in the 358 Modified division at Brockville Speedway in Ontario, and continued his success at racetracks in southeastern Canada such as Autodrome Edelweiss in Cantley, Quebec, and Cornwall Motor Speedway in Ontario. He also competed on the New York side of the border including Can-Am Speedway in LaFargeville, Fonda Speedway, and Mohawk International Raceway in Hogansburg.

O’Brien captured 100 feature event wins and 14 of his 18 track titles at Brockville. He was inducted into the Northeast Dirt Modified Hall of Fame in 2023.

== Personal life ==
O’Brien comes from a racing family, as his father Pat O’Brien Sr. was a regular at the Watertown (New York) and Kingston (Ontario) Speedways in the 1950s, 1960s and early 1970s, and brothers Pat Jr. and Tim eventually became regular competitors.

In 1996 Danny was injured in a serious crash at Can-Am, which required multiple surgeries to save his eyesight and reconstruct his face.
