= David Hébert =

Canadian racing driver

- Born: David Hébert; August 5, 1975 (age 51) Saint-Damase, Quebec

Modified racing career
- Debut season: 1994
- Car number: One, 4
- Championships: 21
- Wins: 211

Championship titles
- 2024, 2025 NASCAR Northeast Regional Champion; 2011, 2014, 2015, 2016, 2017 Mr. DIRTcar 358 Modified Champion

Awards
- 1999 CASCAR Sportsman Series Rookie of the Year

NASCAR Canada Series career
- 2 races run over 1 year
- First race: 2023 Ohsweken Speedway
- Last race: 2023 Ohsweken Speedway
Wins	Top tens	Poles
0	1	0
- Statistics up to date as of November 1, 2026.

David Hébert (born August 5, 1975) is a Canadian professional stock car racing driver.

== Racing career ==
David Hébert started racing in the sportsman-modified class in 1994 and moved to the Modifieds two years later. In 1999 he joined with the ONE Racing team, where he spent the next quarter of a century. In 2026 Hébert moved to the Groupe Léveillé sponsored racing team.

Hébert raced successfully across Quebec with nine Autodrome Granby track championships, seven Autodrome Drummond titles, and five RPM Speedway crowns. He's tallied more than 200 feature wins which included victories at Cornwall and Brockville speedways in Ontario, as well as Mohawk International Raceway, Can-Am Speedway and Airborne Speedway in northeastern New York State.

Hébert is a two-time NASCAR regional series champion. In full fendered race cars, he competed in multiple CASCAR Sportsman races between 1999 and 2001 and had a pair of NASCAR Canada Series starts at Ohsweken Speedway in 2023. He was inducted into the Canadian Motorsport Hall of Fame in 2025.

== Personal life ==
Hébert's daughter and teammate, Daphné, won the 2023 Rookie of the Year title in the Sportsman division at Autodrome Granby.

== Career results ==
=== NASCAR ===
(key) (Bold – Pole position awarded by qualifying time. Italics – Pole position earned by points standings or practice time. * – Most laps led.)

==== Pinty's Series ====
NASCAR Canada Series results
Year	Team	No.	Make	1	2	3	4	5	6	7	8	9	10	11	12	13	14	NPSC	Pts	Ref
2023	ONE Racing	01	Chevy	SUN	MSP	ACD	AVE	TOR	EIR	SAS	SAS	CTR	OSK; 13	OSK; 7	ICAR	MSP	DEL	36th	68	
