= Jack Johnson (racing driver) =

American Dirt Modified racing driver (born 1944)

- Born: Jack R. Johnson; September 2, 1944 Duanesburg, New York
- Died: April 1, 2021 (aged 76)
- Retired: 2009

Modified racing career
- Debut season: 1966
- Car number: 12A
- Championships: 18
- Wins: 428

Championship titles
- 1979, 1980, 1982, 1984, 1987, 1988 Super DIRT Series Champion; 1980, 1982, 1984, 1985, 1987, 1988 Mr. Dirt Champion; 1984, 1986, 2000 New York State Fair Champion

Awards
- 1980 EMPA Al Holbert National Driver of the Year

Jack Johnson (September 2, 1944 – April 1, 2021) was an American dirt modified racing driver. A six-time Mr. Dirt Champion and four-time Super DIRT Series Champion, Johnson won 428 Modified feature races at 35 tracks in ten states and two Canadian provinces.

== Racing career ==
Johnson got his interest in racing from his father Rollie Johnson who raced sprint cars. After discharge from the Army in 1966, Johnson began his Modified career at the Fonda Speedway, New York, where he went on to win 11 track championships.

Johnson also won championships at the New York tracks at Albany-Saratoga Speedway in Malta, Brewerton Speedway, Rolling Wheels Raceway in Elbridge, Utica-Rome Speedway in Vernon, and Weedsport Speedway. In 1979 and again in 1984 Johnson won the Super Dirt Week main event at the Syracuse Mile.

Johnson was inducted into the New York State Stock Car Association and Eastern Motorsports Press Association Halls of Fame. Johnson was also nominated to the Northeast Dirt Modified Hall of Fame in 2002, but postponed his induction until 2012, saying that he had more races to win.

== Personal life ==
Johnson's last win was at Sharon Speedway (Ohio) in 2009, as a crash sidelined him later that year. While in the hospital, doctors discovered a cancerous nodule on Johnson's right lung. He underwent surgery and began the recovery process. Shortly after the operation, Johnson showed symptoms of ALS, and after a long battle, he succumbed to the disease in 2021.
