= Fonda 200 =

Auto race held in Fonda, New York, United States

- Venue: Fonda Speedway
- Location: Fonda, New York, United States
- First race: 1955
- Laps: 200
- Most wins (driver): Brett Hearn (4), Stewart Friesen (4)

The Fonda 200 is a 100-mile-long (161 km) modified motor race that is held at the Fonda Speedway. The race was run in 1955, 1963–1964, 1966–1970, 1983–1995, 1997–2002, 2019, and 2021 to the present. The 1955, 1966, 1967, and 1968 races were sanctioned by NASCAR. Notable drivers have included Junior Johnson, David Pearson, Richard Petty, and Bobby Allison. Brett Hearn and Stewart Friesen have won the race four times, which is more than any other driver.

There is a prize of $22,000 for the winner. The race was not run in 2020 due to COVID-19 restrictions.

== List of Fonda 200 winners ==
1955: Junior Johnson (NASCAR Grand National)

1963: Steve Danish

1964: Bill Wimble

1966: David Pearson (NASCAR Grand National)

1967: Richard Petty (NASCAR Grand National)

1968: Richard Petty (NASCAR Grand National)

1969: Lou Lazzaro

1970: Harry Peek

1983: Charlie Rudolph

1984: Jimmy Horton

1985: Charlie Rudolph

1986: Jack Johnson

1987: Kenny Brightbill

1988: Jack Johnson

1989: Mike Romano

1990: Doug Hoffman

1991: Doug Hoffman

1992: Bob McCreadie

1993: Bob McCreadie

1994: Jimmy Horton

1995: Brett Hearn

1997: Brett Hearn

1998: Brett Hearn

1999: Steve Paine

2000: Kenny Tremont

2001: Doug Hoffman

2002: Brett Hearn

2019 Stewart Friesen

2021 Stewart Friesen

2022 Matt Sheppard

2023 Stewart Friesen

2024 Matt Sheppard

2025 Matt Sheppard

2026 Stewart Friesen
