= Steve Paine =

American Dirt Modified racing driver (born 1961)

- Born: Stephen Paine; January 7, 1961 (age 65) Waterloo, New York

Modified racing career
- Debut season: 1983
- Car number: 7x
- Championships: 32
- Wins: 331

Previous series
- 1980-1982 1979: Late model Street Stock (13 Wins)

Championship titles
- 2000 Mr. Dirt Super Series Champion; 1999, 2002 Mr. Dirt 358 Modified Champion
- Statistics up to date as of January 22, 2025.

Stephen Paine (born January 7, 1961) is an American Dirt Modified racing driver who has earned over 330 feature events at 26 tracks. He captured 32 track championships, including nine straight at the Canandaigua Speedway, New York, from 2000 to 2008.

== Racing career ==
Paine began his racing career in 1979 in a Street Stock class with 13 wins at the Canandaigua Speedway. He has competed and been victorious at the east coast race tracks from Florida to Canada, including Autodrome Granby, Quebec; Bridgeport Speedway, New Jersey; and Black Rock Speedway in Dundee, Fonda Speedway, Fulton Speedway, Ransomville Speedway, and Weedsport Speedway, all in New York.

Paine was crowned the overall Mr. DIRT champion in 2000, and he was inducted into the Northeast Dirt Modified Hall of Fame in 2017.

== Personal life ==
Paine comes from a racing family. As he was growing up, his parents, Don and Nancy, owned a race car, and through the 1980s brother Bobby also drove. In 2018, Steve's son Billy began the third generation in racing, and two years later son Tommy got into the driver's seat.
