= Alan Johnson (racing driver) =

American Dirt Modified racing driver (born 1957)

- Born: October 3, 1957 (age 69) Phelps, New York, U.S.

Modified racing career
- Debut season: 1974
- Car number: 14J
- Championships: 37
- Wins: 560+

Championship titles
- 1981, 1983 Mr. Dirt Champion; 1981, 1983, 2002, 2003, 2006 Super DIRT Series Champion; 1997, 1998, 2001, 2005 Mr. Dirt 358 Modified Champion; 2006 Race of Champions Dirt Modified Tour

Awards
- 2004, 2007 EMPA North East Driver of the Year
- Statistics up to date as of August 1, 2024.

Alan Johnson (born October 3, 1957) is an American Dirt Modified racing driver who has earned over 560 feature event at 39 tracks in seven states and two Canadian provinces.

== Racing career ==
Johnson began his racing career in 1975 with a win at the Canandaigua Speedway, New York, and claimed at least one feature event victory annually over the next 48 years. He has competed and been victorious at the east coast racetracks from Florida to Canada, including the New York speedways: Black Rock in Dundee, Fulton, Orange County Fair in Middletown, Ransomville, and Weedsport.

Johnson captured the 1983, 1989, and 2003 Super Dirt Week 300 on the Syracuse Mile and was crowned the overall Mr. DIRT champion five times. He was honored by the Eastern Motorsport Press Association as driver of the year in 2004 and again in 2007, and was inducted into the Northeast Dirt Modified Hall of Fame in 2017. Johnson was inducted into the 2025 class of both the Eastern Motorsports Press Association and the New York State Stock Car Association Halls of Fame

== Personal life ==
Johnson comes from a racing family. As he was growing up, his father, Milt, was racing at Central New York tracks and building race engines. Eventually his younger brother Danny got into the driver's seat, and in 2018, Daniel Johnson, Danny's son, began the third generation in racing.
