= Ed Ortiz =

American Modified racing driver (1931-2020)

- Born: Edward Ortiz; September 19, 1931 Ransomville, New York
- Died: April 16, 2020 (aged 88)
- Retired: 1998
- Debut season: 1955

Modified racing
- Car number: 0
- Championships: 5
- Wins: 200

Championship titles
- 1962 NASCAR NY Sportsman Champion

Edward Oritz (September 19, 1931 – April 16, 2020) was an American Modified racing driver. Equally adept on both dirt and asphalt surfaces, he raced from Canada to New Jersey, and is credited with 200 feature wins in a career that spanned five decades.

== Racing career ==
Ortiz and fifteen friends got into racing in 1954, building the original Ransomville Speedway (New York) on the property behind his father's car dealership. Four years later, the group raised sufficient funds to purchase their own land, and the current Ransomville Speedway was built at its present location. Ortiz won the track's championship in 1962.

Ortiz claimed the track championship at Ontario, Canada's Merrittville Speedway (1961), and additional titles in New York at the Canandaigua Speedway (1962, 1963), Lancaster Speedway (1966), and Rolling Wheels Raceway in Elbridge (1971). He also found victory lane in New York at Utica-Rome Speedway in Vernon and Victoria Speedway in Dunnsville, and in New Jersey at Old Bridge Stadium.

Ortiz was inducted into the Northeast Dirt Modified Hall of Fame in 1999.
