= Marcel LaFrance =

Canadian Dirt Modified racing driver (1940 - 2022)

- Born: August 12, 1940 St. Albert, Ontario, Canada
- Died: February 19, 2022 (aged 81)
- Retired: 1999
- Debut season: 1962

Modified racing career
- Car number: 15
- Championships: 5
- Wins: 268

Marcel LaFrance (August 12, 1940 – February 19, 2022) was a Canadian dirt modified racing driver. His racing career spanned two countries and 38 years, winning 268 feature events and claiming five track titles.

== Racing career ==
Marcel LaFrance began racing in 1962 at the Casselman Raceway, Ontario, but left the sport when that racetrack closed a year later. He resumed racing in 1967, but still had a frustrating career, not winning any feature over his first 17 years driving.

After the first win, LaFrance was routinely victorious at race venues on either side of the St. Lawrence River, including Capital City Speedway (Ottawa, Ontario) as well as Black Rock Speedway (Dundee), Can-Am Speedway (LaFargeville), Frogtown Speedway (Akwesasne), and Watertown Speedway in New York. He won the 1980, 1982, and 1983 Brockville Ontario Speedway track titles, and also in Ontario claimed the 1981 Cornwall Motor Speedway and 1986 Autodrome Eldeweiss track championships

Marcel LaFrance was inducted into the Northeast Dirt Modified Hall of Fame in 2001.
