= Dale Planck =

American Dirt Modified racing driver (1970–2024)

- Born: July 16, 1970 Homer, New York
- Died: June 22, 2024 (aged 53)
- Retired: 2019
- Debut season: 1985

Modified racing career
- Years active: 1988-2019
- Car number: 77X
- Championships: 11
- Wins: 189

Previous series
- 1985-1987 Wins: Mini-Stock; 12

Championship titles
- 1994, 1995 NASCAR Mid-America and 1996 NASCAR New England Regional Champion; 2009, 2012 Mr. DIRTcar 358 Modified Champion

Dale Planck (July 16, 1970 – June 22, 2024) was an American Dirt Modified racing driver, credited with over 200 career wins at tracks in the Mid-Atlantic (United States) and two Canadian provinces.

== Racing career ==
Planck began his racing career in 1985 in a 4-cylinder mini-mod at Dundee Speedway, New York, and by 1988, he had moved to the 358-modified class. He was soon competing successfully at the toughest venues in the Northeast, including Big Diamond Speedway (Pottsville) and Kutztown Speedway in Pennsylvania; Afton Park Speedway, Brewerton Speedway, Canandaigua Speedway, Orange County Fair Speedway (Middletown), Rolling Wheels Raceway (Elbridge), the Syracuse Mile, and the Weedsport Speedway in New York; Hagerstown Speedway, Maryland; and Merrittville Speedway in Thorold, Ontario.

Planck won the first of three consecutive NASCAR regional modified championships in 1994, captured the 2012 DIRTcar 358-Modified touring series, and was the Mr. Dirtcar 358-modified titlist in 2009 and 2012. Along the way, he claimed track championships at Fulton Speedway and Utica-Rome Speedway (Vernon) in New York.

Planck was inducted into the New York State Stock Car Association Hall of Fame with the class of 2024 and the Northeast Dirt Modified Hall of Fame in 2025.

Plank died on June 22, 2024, at the age of 53.
