= Pat O'Brien (racing driver) =

Canadian Dirt Modified racing driver (born 1965)

- Born: Patrick O'Brien Jr. November 16, 1965 (age 61) Kingston, Ontario, Canada
- Retired: 2016
- Debut season: 1985

Modified racing career
- Car number: 1, 6
- Championships: 22
- Wins: 185

Championship titles
- 1988, 1990, 1992, 1995 Mr. Dirt 358 Modified Champion; 2006 Mr. Dirt 358 (Northern Region)

Patrick O'Brien (born November 16, 1965) is a retired Canadian Dirt Modified racing driver. Credited with more than 185 wins at seven speedways in two countries, he earned four Mr. DIRT 358 series crowns.

== Racing career ==
Pat O'Brien began racing in 1985 in the 358 Modified division, and centered his career at the racetracks in southeastern Canada including Autodrome Edelweiss (Cantley), Autodrome Drummond (Drummondville), and Autodrome Granby in Quebec, Brighton Speedway and Cornwall Motor Speedway in Ontario, and Can-Am Speedway (LaFargeville), Fulton Speedway, and Mohawk International Raceway (Hogansburg) in northern New York state.

O'Brien has captured 22 track championships, including 10 titles at Can-Am. He was inducted into the Northeast Dirt Modified Hall of Fame in 2019.

== Personal life ==
O'Brien comes from a racing family, as his father Pat O'Brien Sr. was a regular at the Watertown Speedway (New York) and Kingston Speedway (Ontario) in the 1950s, 1960s and early 1970s, and brothers Danny and Tim eventually became regular competitors.
