= Danny Johnson (racing driver) =

American Dirt Modified racing driver (born 1960)

- Born: Daniel L. Johnson; March 3, 1960 (age 66) Phelps, New York

Modified racing career
- Debut season: 1979 Canandaigua Speedway
- Car number: 27J
- Championships: 14
- Wins: 606

Championship titles
- 1988 New York State Fair Champion; 1989, 1992, 1997 Mr. Dirt Champion; 1989, 1992, 1997, 1999 Super DIRT Series Champion; 1996, 1999, 2000, 2010 Mr. Dirt 358 Modified Champion; 2011 DIRTcar 358 Modified Series Champion; 2012 Race of Champions Dirt Modified Tour
- Statistics up to date as of July 17, 2025.

Danny Johnson (born March 3, 1960) is an American Dirt Modified racing driver who has earned over 600 feature event victories at 55 different speedways in 13 states and two Canadian provinces.

== Racing career ==
Johnson began his racing career in 1979 with a win at the Canandaigua Speedway, New York, and claimed his 600th victory in 2022 at the Outlaw Speedway in Dundee, New York. He has also competed and been victorious at the east coast racetracks from Florida to Canada, including the New York venues of Lebanon Valley Speedway, Orange County Fair Speedway in Middletown, Ransomville Speedway, and Weedsport Speedway.

Johnson captured the 1997 Super Dirt Week 300 on the Syracuse Mile and won the companion 358 modified title twice, first in 1997, and then in 2006. He was crowned the overall Mr. DIRT champion in 1989, 1992, 1997 and again in 1999, and was inducted into the Northeast Dirt Modified Hall of Fame in 2019, and the 2025 class of the New York State Stock Car Association Hall of Fame.

== Personal life ==
Johnson comes from a racing family. As he was growing up, his father, Milt, was racing at Central New York tracks and building race engines. Eventually his older brother Alan got into the driver's seat, and in 2018, Daniel Johnson, Danny's son, began the third generation in racing.
