= Super Dirt Week =

Modified car racing event held in Central New York state

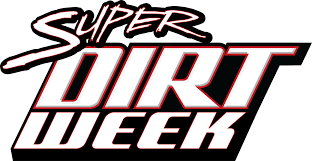

Super DIRTcar Series
- Venue: Oswego Speedway
- Location: Oswego, New York, United States
- First race: 1972 Syracuse Mile
- Laps: 200
- Most wins (driver): Brett Hearn, Stewart Friesen (6)

Circuit information
- Surface: Clay
- Length: .625 mi (1.006 km)
- Turns: 4

Super Dirt Week is a modified racing event held annually on Columbus Day weekend in Central New York state.

== History ==
The first event was scheduled over three days, from September 29, through October 1, 1972 at the New York State Fairgrounds. Inspection and qualifying races were conducted on Friday and Saturday, and the Championship race was held on Sunday.

In 1976 a fourth day was added to the schedule, and a 100 mile race the USAC Champ Cars was held on Saturday October 2. The date of the event was eventually changed to Columbus Day weekend, and expanded to 6 days and championships for 5 car classes. The Syracuse Mile remained the featured race track until 2015, and companion races were added over the week at the nearby racetracks Rolling Wheels Raceway in Elbridge, Weedsport Speedway, and Brewerton Speedway.

After the 2015 event the grandstands at the Syracuse Mile were torn down and the track was eliminated. Oswego Speedway began hosting the primary races the following year.

== Oswego era ==
Oswego Speedway is a five-eighths-mile asphalt track that runs weekly supermodified races. Each year following the Budweiser Classic Weekend, the oval coverts into a dirt track. That process requires placement of over 200 jersey barriers around the inside hub rail, and then 10-wheel dump trucks that bring in between four and five hundred loads are spread around the racing surface.

Super Dirt Week is now the largest economic event for Oswego, New York as more than 30,000 fans attend. Racing rules may be adjusted as necessary, and in 2023 new pit stop strategies were introduced allowing teams to remain on the track while others pit to improve their cars.

== Media coverage ==
The event was first televised live on ESPN in 1980. During the next 35 years, broadcast rights went to TNN, the Empire Sports Net, SPEED, to CBS Sports Network, and more recently to MAVTV. Presently, streaming services are produced by the World Racing Group and are available on all DIRTVisions OTT platforms from iOS to Android, to Samsung, to ROKU.

== List of winners ==
Super Dirt Week Champions
Syracuse Mile
Year	Modified	358 Modified	Sportsman	Pro-Stock & Late Model^{†}	Sprint Car	Champ Car & Supermodified^{‡}
1972	Buzzie Reutimann					
1973	Buzzie Reutimann					
1974	Billy Osmun					
1975	Toby Tobias					
1976	Gary Balough					
1977	Gary Balough					Pancho Carter
1978	Gary Balough				Bentley Warren	Larry Dickson
1979	Jack Johnson				Smokey Snellbaker	
1980	Gary Balough	Jeff Heotzler			Steve Kinser	
1981	Merv Treichler	Steve Makocy			Doug Wolfgang	
1982	Merv Treichler	Pete Bicknell			Sammy Swindell	
1983	Alan Johnson	Pete Bicknell			Doug Wolfgang	
1984	Jack Johnson	Bob McCreadie			Sammy Swindell	
1985	Brett Hearn	Doug Hoffman			Sammy Swindell	
1986	Bob McCreadie	Brett Hearn		Donnie Moran^{†}	Steve Kinser	Joe Gosek^{‡}
1987	Jimmy Horton	Billy Pauch		Donnie Moran^{†}	Dave Blaney	Gene Lee Gibson^{‡}
1988	Kenny Brightbill	Kenny Tremont Jr.			Steve Kinser	Joe Gosek^{‡}
1989	Alan Johnson	Brett Hearn			Doug Wolfgang	
1990	Brett Hearn	Brett Hearn			Sammy Swindell	
1991	Brett Hearn	Billy Decker			Sammy Swindell	
1992	Toby Tobias, Jr.	Kenny Tremont Jr.			Steve Kinser	
1993	Brett Hearn	Mike Ricci			Dave Blaney	
1994	Jimmy Horton	Danny Johnson			Billy Pauch	
1995	Brett Hearn	Jimmy Hauser			Steve Kinser	
1996	Doug Hoffman	Kenny Tremont Jr.				
1997	Danny Johnson	Kenny Tremont Jr.	Jim Sorensen, Jr.	Kenny Martin		
1998	Billy Decker	Pete Bicknell	Chris Kokosa	Tom Cannizzaro		
1999	Kenny Tremont Jr.	Pete Bicknell	Chad Brachmann	Frank Twing	Mike Woodring	
2000	Billy Decker	Pete Bicknell	Matt Sheppard	Jipp Ortiz	Lance Young	
2001	Billy Decker	Bud Christmann	Ryan Godown	Jipp Ortiz	Curt Michael	
2002	Vic Coffey	Billy Decker		Dave Schulz		J.J. Yeley
2003	Alan Johnson	Matt Sheppard		Jamie McGannon		J.J. Yeley
2004	Tim Fuller	Wayne Jelley	Tim Hindley	Dave Schulz		
2005	Billy Decker	Tim Fuller	Kenny Stafford	Dave Schulz		
2006	Danny Johnson	Danny Johnson	John Ferrier	Louie Jackson, Jr.		
2007	Vic Coffey	Brett Hearn	Sammy Reakes, IV	Don Carlson		
2008	Frank Cozze	Billy Decker	Erick Rudolph	Sean Corr		
2009	Matt Sheppard	Billy Decker	Matt Billings	Pete Stefanski		
2010	Stewart Friesen	Billy Decker	Ryan Susice	Rocky Warner		
2011	Stewart Friesen	Billy Decker	Neal Williams	Rocky Warner		
2012	Brett Hearn	Tim McCreadie	Rocky Warner	Pete Stefanski		
2013	Billy Dunn	Brett Hearn	Brad Rouse	Rob Yetman		Kody Swanson
2014	Stewart Friesen	Brett Hearn	Jimmy Spellmon	Rob Yetman		Kody Swanson
2015	Stewart Friesen	Jimmy Phelps	Rocky Warner	Rob Yetman		
Oswego Speedway: Year / Modified / 358 Modified / Sportsman / Pro-Stock / src.; 2016 / Stewart Friesen / Tim Fuller / Dave Marcuccilli / Rob Yetman; 2017 / Matt Sheppard / Matt Sheppard / Dave Marcuccilli / Rob Yetman; 2018 / Larry Wight / Pete Britten / Shane Pecore / Charles-David Beauchamp; 2019 / Mat Williamson / Billy Decker / Kyle Inman / Josh Coonradt; 2021 / Mat Williamson / Stewart Friesen / Zach Sobotka / Chad Jeseo; 2022 / Matt Sheppard / Matt Sheppard / Cody McPherson / Nick Stone; 2023 / Mat Williamson / Mat Williamson / Matt Janczuk / Luke Horning; 2024 / Stewart Friesen / Mat Williamson / Matt Janczuk / Beau Ballard; 2025 / Mat Williamson / Mat Williamson / Richard Murtaugh / Devon Camenga; 2026 / Darren Smith / Alex Yankowski / Tristan Ladouceur / NIck Stone
