= Swartzlander =

Swartzlander is a surname. Notable people with the surname include:

- Brian Swartzlander (born 1959), American racing driver
- Grover Swartzlander (fl. from 1982), American physicist
