= 67th Annual Race of Champions 250 =

The 67th Annual Presque Isle Downs Race of Champions 250 will be held at Lake Erie Speedway. This race will mark the end of the 2017 Race of Champions Modified Series. Before the big race on the same day the Race of Champions Late Models, Classic Asphalt Modifieds, and Lancaster Super Stocks. On the day before the big race the Race of Champions Sportsman, and Super Stocks will race their final race of the 2017 season.
