= Will Cagle =

American racing driver (1938–2025)

- Born: Candler William Cagle; March 24, 1938
- Died: February 5, 2025 (aged 86)
- Retired: 1985
- Debut season: 1953

Modified racing career
- Car number: 24
- Championships: 26
- Wins: 415+

Championship titles
- 1976, 1978, 1979 Mr. Dirt Champion; 1974, 1975, 1976, 1977 Super DIRT Series Champion; 1969 All Star Stock Car Racing League Champion; 1966 Langhorne National Open

Candler William Cagle (March 24, 1938 – February 5, 2025) was an American driver of modified stock cars. He won over 415 feature events and 26 championships at east coast venues stretching from Florida to Canada.

== Racing career ==
Cagle began racing in his native Tampa, Florida, in 1953, at the age of 15, and relocated to the Northeast in 1959 for the numerous racing venues and higher purses. Some of his more notable races and winning streaks came at the Albany-Saratoga Speedway New York, Canandaigua Speedway New York, Langhorne Speedway Pennsylvania, Nazareth Speedway Pennsylvania, and Orange County Fair Speedway New York.

In 1973, Cagle won 17 of 21 features for his first of six track championships at the Weedsport Speedway, but in 1985 the track became the site of a career ending leg injury when his car's drive shaft broke. The next year, he became general manager at Orange County, and later promoted Florida's East Bay Raceway and USA International Speedway.

Cagle was inducted into the Northeast Dirt Modified, New York State Stock Car Association and Eastern Motorsports Press Association Halls of Fame.

== Personal life ==
Cagle suffered a head injury after a fall at his home on January 27, 2025, and died from complications on February 5, at the age of 86.
