= Race of Champions (modified racing) =

American racing organization

Race of Champions (ROC)
- Category: Modified racing
- Country: United States & Canada
- Region: Northeastern United States
- Inaugural season: 1994
- Classes: Modifieds, Sportsman, Late Models, Super Stocks, Dirt Sportsman, Street Stocks, Four Cylinders, 602 Asphalt Sportsman
- Tire suppliers: Hoosier
- Current champions: Matt Hirschman
- Official website: https://www.rocmodifiedseries.com/

The Race of Champions is a racing organization which sanctions eight different series on asphalt and dirt surfaces, and promotes an annual marquee racing weekend featuring one of the oldest continuing championship races in the United States.

== History ==
The Al Gerber Trophy Race of Champions originated in 1951 as the National Open on the dirt surfaced Langhorne Speedway in Middletown Township, Bucks County, near the borough of Langhorne, Pennsylvania, a northern suburb of Philadelphia. In order to secure the strongest modified field possible, promoters Al Gerber and Irv Fried guaranteed starting spots in the race to the track champions at many of the top short-tracks in the northeast.

After the 1971 event the speedway was closed, and the race was rebranded the Race of Champions. The event was relocated first to Trenton Speedway in New Jersey, subsequently to Pocono Raceway in Pennsylvania, and then back to New Jersey at the Flemington Speedway. The process of awarding the guaranteed starting positions in the annual Race of Champions was replaced with the 'Trail of Champions', a touring series of special events held at venues throughout the northeast, and which crowned its own champion.

In 1996, promoters Alex Friesen and Andrew Harpell purchased the rights to the event from Al Gerber's son Joe, and moved the race to the Oswego Speedway in New York. Later that year, Friesen was fatally injured in a snowmobile accident, and Harpell moved forward with plans to expand the business model to sanction races and touring series for other classes of race cars. Going into the 2016 season, Joe Skotnicki, a former Super DIRTcar Series director, left his post with World Racing Group and purchased both the dirt and asphalt programs from Harpell.

== Race of Champions Touring Series ==
The Race of Champions Touring Series has grown to a family of stock car racing series on both dirt and asphalt including asphalt modifieds, dirt and asphalt sportsman, late models, super stock and the 4 cylinder dash. It was nominated for and won Best Touring Series on the 51's (which is an annual fan voted awards) for the 2017 season. In the 2019 season a TQ Midget Series was introduced into the Race of Champions Group. Andy Jankowiak became the inaugural series champion at Lake Erie Speedway. Also in 2019 the Race of Champions began experimenting with sim racing via iRacing.com one of the most well-known sim racing services.

=== Asphalt Modified Series ===
The Race of Champions Asphalt Modified Series was first developed by Harpell in 1994 as the New York Modified Series. It was rebranded upon the creation of the Dirt Modified Tour in 2005.

Asphalt Modified Champions
Year	Name	Year	Name
1994	Charlie Rudolph	2014	Chuck Hossfeld
1995	George Kent	2015	Matt Hirschman
1996	George Kent	2016	Patrick Emerling
1997	Chuck Hossfeld	2017	Mike Leaty
1998	J.R. Kent	2018	Chuck Hossfeld
1999	J.R. Kent	2019	Patrick Emerling
2000	George Kent	2020	Patrick Emerling
2001	George Kent	2021	Austin Beers
2002	George Kent	2022	Mike Leaty
2003	George Kent	2023	Zane Zeiner
2004	Tony Hanbury	2024	Zane Zeiner
2005	Matt Hirschman	2025	Matt Hirschman
2006	Earl Paules		
2007	Pete Brittain		
2008	Matt Hirschman		
2009	Matt Hirschman		
2010	Matt Hirschman		
2011	Chuck Hossfeld		
2012	Matt Hirschman		
2013	Matt Hirschman		

Asphalt Modifieds: All-time wins list
Driver	Wins	Driver	Wins
Matt Hirschman	60	Duane Delamarter	1
Chuck Hossfeld	29	Charlie Rudolph	1
George Kent	22	Tyler Rypkema	1
Patrick Emerling	20	Ken Woolley Jr.	1
Jan Leaty	16	Wilbur Hebing	1
Mike Leaty	13	John Markovic	1
Andy Jankowiak	11	Kory Rabenold	1
Sege Fidanza	10	Ted Christopher	1
Zane Zeiner	10	William Thomas	1
Eric Beers	10	Chris Ammon	1
T.J. Potrzebowski	9	Bill Woods	1
J.R. Kent	9	George Skora III	1
Pete Brittian	6	Brian Bowen	1
Tony Hanbury	6	Rick Fuller	1
Lee Sherwood	4	Tommy Catalano	1
Tom McGrath	3	Scott Lesher	1
Tyler Haydt	3	Doug Wolcott	1
Bill Putney	3	Daren Scherer	1
Jimmy Zacharias	3	Kyle Strohl	1
Erick Rudolph	3	Donny Lia	1
Earl Paules	3	Rick Woods	1
Kyle Ebersole	2	Bryan Sherwood	1
Tony Hirschman	2	Jimmy Blewett	1
Tim Mangus	2	Tim Arre	1
Rusty Smith	2	Bobby Holmes	1
Don Wagner	2	Tim Connolly	1
Austin Beers	2	Jeff Ulrich	1
Austin Kochenash	2	Mike Stefanik	1
Jack Ely	2	Danny Knoll Jr.	1
Jack Lutz	2	Ron Silk	1
Rick Kirkendall	1		
Dave Pecko	1		

=== Dirt Modified Series ===
The Race of Champions Dirt Modified Tour was formed in 2005 as an alternative for dirt modified and sportsman cars. The Dirt 602 Sportsman Modified Series continues on, but the modified portion was disbanded in 2017.

Dirt Modified Champions
Year	Driver	Year	Region	Driver
2017	Mike Bowman	2007	South	Pat Ward
2016	Matt Sheppard	2007	North	Ronnie Johnson
2015	Stewart Friesen	2007	NATIONAL	Pat Ward
2014	Stewart Friesen	2006	South	Jimmy Horton
2013	Stewart Friesen	2006	North	Mitch Gibbs
2012	Danny Johnson	2006	NATIONAL	Alan Johnson
2011	Billy Decker	2005	South	Jeff Strunk
2010	Stewart Friesen	2005	North	Bobby Varin
2009	Pat Ward	2005	NATIONAL	Mitch Gibbs; Bobby Varin
2008	Pat Ward	2005	NATIONAL	Mitch Gibbs; Bobby Varin

== The Al Gerber Trophy Race of Champions ==
The Al Gerber Trophy Race of Champions is the yearly stock car race using modified race cars and is the direct descendant of the National Open. Although the first 14 open championships were held on a dirt surface, Langhorne Speedway was paved in 1965, and the event has since been held on asphalt surfaces. The tracks hosting the event have ranged from the .375 mile Lake Erie Speedway in Erie, Pennsylvania to the 2.5 mile Pocono Raceway tri-oval.

Race of Champions: Al Gerber Trophy Winners' list
Event	Year	Winner	Car #	Track	Event	Year	Winner	Car #	Track
1	1951	Hully Bunn	X	Langhorne PA; 1.0 mi (Dirt)	46	1996	Jan Leaty	25	Oswego NY.626 mi (Paved)
2	1952	Jim DeLaney		Langhorne PA; 1.0 mi (Dirt)	47	1997	Tony Hirschman		Oswego NY.626 mi (Paved)
3	1953	Ted Swaim		Langhorne PA; 1.0 mi (Dirt)	48	1998	Sege Fidanza	77	Oswego NY.626 mi (Paved)
4	1954	Frankie Schneider		Langhorne PA; 1.0 mi (Dirt)	49	1999	Chuck Hossfeld	22	Oswego NY.626 mi (Paved)
5	1955	Pete Corey		Langhorne PA; 1.0 mi (Dirt)	50	2000	George Kent Sr.		Oswego NY.626 mi (Paved)
6	1956	Dutch Hoag		Langhorne PA; 1.0 mi (Dirt)	51	2001	George Kent Sr.		Oswego NY.626 mi (Paved)
7	1957	Glenn Guthrie		Langhorne PA; 1.0 mi (Dirt)	52	2002	Tim Mangus	93	Oswego NY.626 mi (Paved)
8	1958	Jim DeLaney		Langhorne PA; 1.0 mi (Dirt)	53	2003	Sege Fidanza		Oswego NY.626 mi (Paved)
9	1959	Jim DeLaney		Langhorne PA; 1.0 mi (Dirt)	54	2004	Eric Beers	9	Oswego NY.626 mi (Paved)
10	1960	Dutch Hoag		Langhorne PA; 1.0 mi (Dirt)	55	2005	Chuck Hossfeld	22	Oswego NY.626 mi (Paved)
11	1961	Bob Malzahn		Langhorne PA; 1.0 mi (Dirt)	56	2006	T.J. Potrzebowski	72	Oswego NY.626 mi (Paved)
12	1962	Frankie Schneider		Langhorne PA; 1.0 mi (Dirt)	57	2007	Jan Leaty	6	Oswego NY.626 mi (Paved)
13	1963	Dutch Hoag		Langhorne PA; 1.0 mi (Dirt)	58	2008	Tony Hirschman	48	Oswego NY.626 mi (Paved)
14	1964	Freddy Adam		Langhorne PA; 1.0 mi (Dirt)	59	2009	Billy Putney	88	Oswego NY.626 mi (Paved)
15	1965	Bill Slater		Langhorne PA; 1.0 mi (Paved)	60	2010	Tony Hirschman	48	Oswego NY.626 mi (Paved)
16	1966	Will Cagle		Langhorne PA; 1.0 mi (Paved)	61	2011	Zane Zeiner		Oswego NY.626 mi (Paved)
17	1967	Dutch Hoag		Langhorne PA; 1.0 mi (Paved)	62	2012	Matt Hirschman	60	Oswego NY.626 mi (Paved)
18	1968	Dutch Hoag		Langhorne PA; 1.0 mi (Paved)	63	2013	Matt Hirschman	60	Oswego NY.626 mi (Paved)
19	1969	Ray Hendrick		Langhorne PA; 1.0 mi (Paved)	64	2014	Chuck Hossfeld		Oswego NY.626 mi (Paved)
20	1970	Merv Treichler		Langhorne PA; 1.0 mi (Paved)	65	2015	Matt Hirschman	60	Chemung NY ^{*}
21	1971	Roger Treichler		Langhorne PA; 1.0 mi (Paved)	66	2016	Matt Hirschman	60	Oswego NY
22	1972	Geoff Bodine	99	Trenton NJ; 1.5 mi (Paved)	67	2017	Matt Hirschman	60	Lake Erie PA.375 mi (Paved)
23	1973	Richie Evans	61	Trenton NJ; 1.5 mi (Paved)	68	2018	Matt Hirschman	60	Lake Erie PA.375 mi (Paved)
24	1974	Fred De Sarro	3	Trenton NJ; 1.5 mi (Paved)	69	2019	Matt Hirschman	60	Lake Erie PA.375 mi (Paved)
25	1975	Ray Hendrick		Trenton NJ; 1.5 mi (Paved)	70	2020	Matt Hirschman	60	Lake Erie PA.375 mi (Paved)
26	1976	Maynard Troyer	6	Trenton NJ; 1.5 mi (Paved)	71	2021	Andy Jankowiak	73	Lake Erie PA.375 mi (Paved)
27	1977	Maynard Troyer	6	Pocono PA; 2.5 mi (Paved)	72	2022^{†}	Jake Lutz	14	Lake Erie PA.375 mi (Paved)
28	1978	Geoff Bodine	1	Pocono PA; 2.5 mi (Paved)	73	2023	Patrick Emerling	14	Lake Erie PA.375 mi (Paved)
29	1979	Richie Evans	61	Pocono PA; 2.5 mi (Paved)	74	2024	Matt Hirschman	60	Lake Erie PA.375 mi (Paved)
30	1980	Richie Evans	61	Pocono PA; 2.5 mi (Paved)	75	2025	Matt Hirschman	60	Thompson CT^{‡}
31	1981	George Kent	26	Pocono PA; 2.5 mi (Paved)	76	2026	Matt Hirschman	60	Shangri-La II^{**}
32	1982	Greg Sacks	5	Pocono PA; 2.5 mi (Paved)					
33	1983	Jimmy Spencer	24	Pocono PA; 2.5 mi (Paved)					
34	1984	Brian Ross	69	Pocono PA; 2.5 mi (Paved)					
35	1985	Brett Bodine	12	Pocono PA; 2.5 mi (Paved)					
36	1986	George Kent	26	Pocono PA; 2.5 mi (Paved)					
37	1987	George Brunnhoelzl	28	Pocono PA; 2.5 mi (Paved)					
38	1988	Reggie Ruggiero	44	Pocono PA; 2.5 mi (Paved)					
39	1989	Tony Hirschman	1	Pocono PA; 2.5 mi (Paved)					
40	1990	Mike Stefanik	15	Pocono PA; 2.5 mi (Paved)					
41	1991	Satch Worley	4	Pocono PA; 2.5 mi (Paved)					
42	1992	Lenny Boyd	55	Flemington NJ.625 mi (Paved)					
43	1993	Billy Pauch	44	Flemington NJ.625 mi (Paved)					
44	1994	Tony Siscone	14	Flemington NJ.625 mi (Paved)					
45	1995	John Blewett III	14	Flemington NJ.625 mi (Paved)					
^{*}Chemung .333 mi (Paved); ^{†}Postponements until 2025; ^{‡}Thompson .625 mi (Paved); ^{**}Shangri-La II, Owego NY .5 mi (Paved)
