= Matt Sheppard =

American racing driver (born 1982)

- Born: July 12, 1982 (age 44) Savannah, New York

Modified racing career
- Debut season: 1999
- Car number: 9s, 44
- Championships: 34
- Wins: 565

Previous series
- 1997 1989-1996: 4 Cylinder; Kart racing

Championship titles
- 2010, 2011, 2012, 2015, 2016, 2017, 2018, 2021, 2022, 2023 Super DIRTcar Series Champion; 2011, 2016, 2017, 2018, 2019, 2021 Mr. DIRTcar Champion; 2009, 2010 Mr. DIRTcar (Central Region); 2017, 2018, 2019, 2023, 2024, 2025 American Racer Cup; 2019, 2021, 2022, 2023, 2024, 2025 Short Track Super Series; 2016 Race of Champions Dirt Modified Tour; 2010, 2012, 2016 DIRTcar Nationals SDS Big Block Modified Champion

Awards
- 2016, 2018, 2022, 2023 EMPA North East Driver of the Year
- Statistics up to date as of November 17, 2026.

Matthew Sheppard (born July12, 1982) is an American professional dirt modified racing driver.

== Racing career ==
Matt Shepperd began racing go-karts it at age 7 at Paradise Speedway in Geneva, New York before dabbling at age 15 in a four-cylinder bandit at the then Black Rock Speedway in Dundee, New York.

The following season he made the move up to a Sportsman-modified with the help of his father, Stu, and veteran Steve Paine. Sheppard won six races his rookie season, then 22 races the next year along with the Mr. DIRT Sportsman championship and the 2000 sportsman race at Super Dirt Week on the Syracuse Mile.

The next year, he took that same car and put a 358-cubic-inch engine under the hood and made the move to the small-block modified division where he won six races at Fulton Speedway and the track's division championship. In 2003 his first win in the big-block modified division was at the Land of Legends Raceway in Canandaigua, New York.

Sheppard has since been successful at 52 tracks along the east coast from Florida to Quebec and added 3 big-block and 3 small-block victories to his Super Dirt Week conquests. As of 2026 Sheppard has captured 34 track championships in New York, including 9 each at the Land of Legends and the Utica-Rome Speedways, 5 at the Brewerton Speedway, and 4 at the now Outlaw Speedway in Dundee.
