= Humberstone Speedway =

Raceway in Port Colborne, Ontario, Canada

- Location: 1716 Main Street East; Port Colborne, Ontario; Canada L3K 5V3
- Coordinates: 42.899091°N 79.200375°W
- Owner: Cosco family
- Opened: 1957
- Former names: Gasport Speedway
- Major events: Super DIRTcar Series; DIRTcar Sportsman Series; Rush Dirt Late Model Series; Knights of Thunder 360 Sprint Car Series; Action Sprint Tour; Southern Ontario Sprints; Empire Super Sprints; Patriot Sprint Tour

Oval
- Surface: Clay
- Length: 0.37 mi (0.6 km)
- Turns: 4
- Banking: 7°

Humberstone Speedway was a 3/8 mile dirt oval raceway located in Port Colborne, Ontario. Races were held on Sunday nights, and regular events include Mini Stocks, 4-Cylinder Trucks, Street Stocks, RUSH Late Models, and DIRT Sportsman races.

== Closure ==
The Humberstone Speedway had announced that the 2024 season would be its last. The site owners, Rankin Construction has declined to renew the speedway's lease. Their plans for the site are unknown.

== Major events ==
The speedway was also host to the Molson All-Canadian, an all day and all night event with extended races for each class, and the annual Eve of Destruction, an event dedicated to demolition-style racing events such as flagpole races, school bus races and blindfold races.

== See also ==
- Dirt track racing
- List of dirt track ovals in Canada
- Sprint car racing
- Short track motor racing
- Auto racing
- Race track
