= List of dirt track ovals in Canada =

Dirt track racing is a type of auto racing performed on oval tracks in Canada. While not as widespread as in the U.S., is still quite popular. Most of the provinces offer several venues for both local racing and special events.

== Venues ==
=== Alberta ===
- RAD Torque Raceway

=== Ontario ===
- Brockville Ontario Speedway
- Buxton Speedway
- Cornwall Speedway
- Emo Speedway
- Humberstone Speedway
- Ohsweken Speedway
- Merrittville Speedway

=== Saskatchewan ===
- Estevan Motor Speedway
