= Brian Swartzlander =

American Dirt Modified racing driver (born 1959)

- Born: August 5, 1959 (age 67) Mifflinburg, Pennsylvania, U.S.

Modified racing career
- Debut season: 1989 Lernerville Speedway
- Car number: 83
- Championships: 15
- Wins: 170+

Previous series
- 1978-1981 1981-1988: Claimer Division; Late Models

Championship titles
- 2007 & 2008 Mr. Dirt (Western Region)
- Statistics up to date as of July 30, 2023.

Brian Swartzlander (born August 5, 1959) is an American Dirt Modified racing driver who has earned 15 track championships including 7 at the Lernerville Speedway in Pennsylvania.

== Racing career ==
Brian Swartzlander drove his first race in a Claimer division car in 1978 at Lernerville Speedway. He has since competed and been victorious at Sportsman's Speedway, Tri-City Speedway, Mercer Raceway Park, Challenger Raceway, Latrobe Speedway, Marion Center Raceway, Pittsburgh Motor Speedway, Hickory Speedway, Central PA Speedway, Thunder Mountain Speedway and Dog Hollow Speedway in Pennsylvania; Sharon Speedway and Raceway 7 in Ohio; and Tyler County Speedway in West Virginia. Swartzlander was inducted into the Northeast Dirt Modified Hall of Fame in 2018.

== Personal life ==
Swartzlander comes from a racing family. His grandfather, Neal, was a regular on the NASCAR Sportsman circuit (predecessor of the Xfinity series) before Brian's dad, Mel, got behind the wheel. His cousin, Dick Swartzlander, was a front-runner in both Late Models and Sprint Cars in western Pennsylvania.
