= Pete Bicknell =

Canadian Dirt Modified racing driver (born 1955)

- Born: January 12, 1955 (age 71) St. Catharines, Ontario, Canada

Modified racing career
- Debut season: 1977
- Car number: 42
- Championships: 49
- Wins: 430+

Previous series
- 1973-1976 Wins 1967-1972: Late model 13; Kart racing

Championship titles
- 1991, 1994, 2008 Mr. Dirt 358 Modified Champion; 2006, 2007, 2008, 2009, 2010 Mr. DIRTcar 358 (Western Region)
- Statistics up to date as of January 5, 2025.

Pete Bicknell (born February 1, 1955) is a Canadian modified racer from St. Catharines, Ontario who was inducted into the Canadian Motorsport Hall of Fame in 2002.

== Racing career ==
Pete Bicknell built his first race car, a late-model, as a shop-class project at West Park Secondary School in St. Catharines, and has been building cars and racing them ever since. Bicknell has won at least 430 modified features in three countries, and he has claimed 49 track championships at four different tracks, including the 2023 title at Merrittville Speedway in Thorold, Ontario.

Bicknell builds cars and sells racing parts and other equipment coast-to-coast in Canada and the U.S. In 2003 he and several partners purchased Merrittville Speedway when a previous owner was having financial difficulties "just to keep it running," and then promoted it for a dozen years before selling.

In addition to the Canadian Motorsports Hall of Fame, Bicknell was inducted into the Northeast Dirt Modified Hall of Fame in 2012 and the New York State Stock Car Association Hall of Fame class of 2014.
