= Brockville Ontario Speedway =

The BOS, The Beast of the East
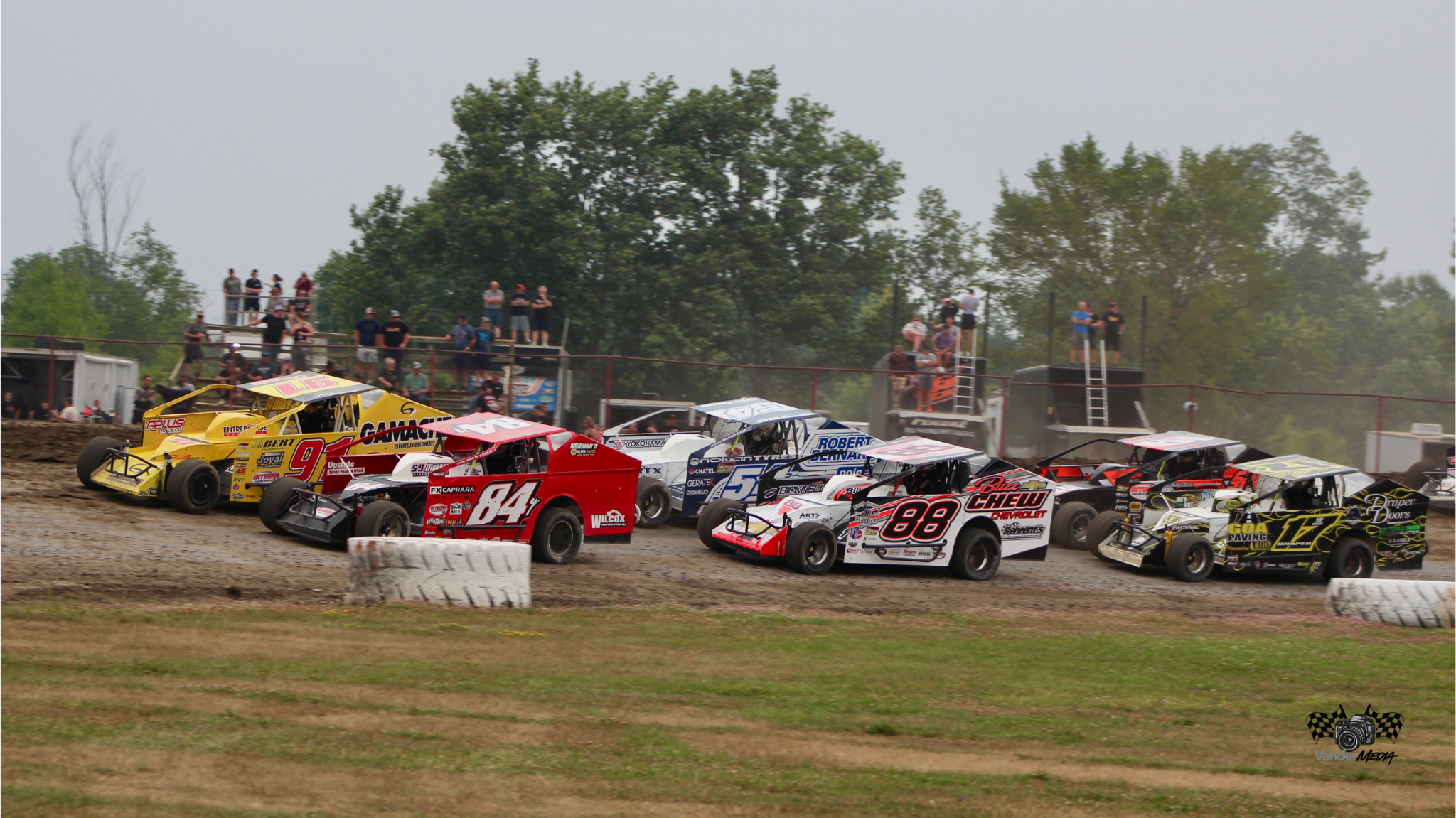
- A Big Block Modified heat race at "The BOS"
- Location: 7214 Temperance Lake Road; Brockville, Ontario, Canada
- Coordinates: 44°38′07″N 75°51′00″W
- Capacity: 2000 (permanent)
- Owner: Paul Kirkland
- Operator: Paul Kirkland
- Broke ground: 1968
- Opened: 1969
- Construction cost: Unknown
- Architect: Ralph Hurley
- Former names: Brockville Speedway; Brockville Canadian Speedway
- Major events: World of Outlaws Sprint Car Series; Super DIRTcar Series; ODLM Late Models; Lucas Oil Canadian Dirt Tour; ESS Sprints; Patriot Sprint Tour; SOS Sprints; ODLM Late Models; O'Reilly All Star Late Models; DIRT Northeast Fall Nationals

Oval
- Surface: Clay
- Length: 0.37 mi (0.6 km)
- Turns: 4
- Banking: 25 degrees (approx.)

Track Records
- Race lap record: 10.923 sec. (Jason Meyers, World of Outlaws Sprint Car, July 29, 2011)
- Race lap record: 11.753 (Davie Franek, 360 Sprint Car (ESS), June 20, 2026)
- Race lap record: 13.727 (Matt Sheppard, Big Block Modified, October 17, 2025)

The Brockville Ontario Speedway is a 3/8 mile dirt track in the city of Brockville, Ontario, Canada. It is located on County Road 29 about 10 kilometres (6 mi) northwest of Brockville. Commonly known as "The BOS", the track has been running a weekly racing schedule for most summers since 1969. The BOS has also run Go-Karts on Wednesday nights since 2005. They race on a smaller oval on the infield of the track.

== History ==
First opening in 1969 as a 1/4 mile long oval with Howard Shaw winning that first track championship. The BOS ran events every year through to the fall of 1980. A change in ownership and lack of funds forced the speedway to close for the 1981 season, but was brought back to life in 1982. The 1983 season was the first year that the speedway ran under the DIRTcar banner, with Marcel LaFrance being the inaugural DIRTcar Track Champion. After the 1984 season, ownership changed once again and the entire facility was rebuilt. The new grandstands put in that year came from the old Lansdowne Park in Ottawa, Ontario. After the 1987 season, The BOS was again shut down and the track sat dormant for the next four years. In 1992, the track was reopened and ran events for six dates that summer. The very next year saw The BOS run its first full racing season since 1987.

The BOS ran weekly events every Thursday night, but it would change to Friday nights in the early 1990s up to mid-2000s. In 2006, it was announced that the track would race on Saturday evenings, a switch that proved well with an increase in car counts for each division. Over the 2007-08 winter, the speedway had major improvements done to the racing surface, making the corners 25 feet longer at each end. The track is now close to 3/8 of a mile.

For the first time in 2009, The BOS extended its season into October with the DirtCar Northeast Fall Nationals finale. The two-day event was held on Oct. 17 & 18, and included the Mr. Dirt series 358 Modified and Pro Stock tours, as well as Sportsman tour race, 360 Sprint car event and a Street Stock Invitational. Because of the success in 2009, the finale returned in 2010 and was run over three days. The event was sponsored again by DirtCar, and also held the championship finales in Pro-Stocks, Sportsman, and Modifieds. The Big Block Modifieds were also in attendance for the first time. Again the event was successful and it will continue to run every October.

On November 4, 2010, the Brockville & District Chamber of Commerce awarded The BOS with the Small Business of the Year Award, and praised the speedway as "one of the crown jewels of the North American motorsport world."

On July 29, 2011, the prestige World of Outlaws Sprint Car series made its first trip to The BOS during a three-race Canadian tour. Many top-tier sprint drivers including 20-time WoO Sprint Car Champion Steve Kinser, and four-time Champ Donny Schatz were in attendance. Paul McMahan won the inaugural event, after three-time series champ Sammy Swindell had a tire issue with a few laps remaining. 2010 WoO Champion Jason Meyers ran the fastest lap ever recorded on the small track with a time of 10.923 seconds. The series brought in thousands of fans - upwards of 3500 - which is likely the biggest crowd ever to watch an event at the speedway.

The 2014 season saw another first as the track hosted the opening event of the Big Block Modified Super DirtCar Series, the seventh appearance of the series at the facility.

On October 17, 2025, during the Fall Nationals, the Big Block Modified track record was broken three times in a single evening. Darren Smith first surpassed the existing record during time trials with a lap time of 13.785 seconds, eclipsing the previous record of 13.824 seconds set by Brett Hearn exactly ten years earlier. In the first heat race, Jack Lehner briefly claimed the new record with a 13.751-second lap, before Matt Sheppard lowered the mark further to 13.727 seconds to set the new benchmark later in the same heat.

Weekly classes that run at the track include Modified, Sportsman, Rookie Sportsman, Street Stock, Rookies and Crate Sprints. A Vintage Modified class also runs every other week. The Sprint Car division was added in 2021. The track ran a Pro-Stock division from 1994 to 2001. Special shows during the year feature the Big Block Modifieds and Late Models.

== Past track champions ==
| Year | Modified | Sportsman | Street Stock | Mini Stock | Novice Sportsman | Crate Sprints |
|---|---|---|---|---|---|---|
| 2026 | Chris Raabe | Dylan Kirkland | Stephane Philippe | Jamie Larocque | Garin Thompson | Andrew Hennessy |
| 2025 | Tristan Draper | Bobby Herrington | Mike Schonauer | Clayton Celovsky | Kyle Kudrinko | Josh Verne Jr. |
| 2024 | Ryan Arbuthnot | Bobby Herrington | Todd Raabe | Matt Boal | Blake Smith | Lee Ladouceur |
| 2023 | Ryan Arbuthnot | Bobby Herrington | Brett Horner | Brandon MacMillan | Dylan Moore | Lee Ladouceur |
| 2022 | Chris Raabe | Bobby Herrington | Brett Horner | Jamie Larocque | Shawn Hodge | Ryan Poole |
| 2021 | Ryan Arbuthnot | Bobby Herrington | Brock Cullen | Jared Galway | Justin Cyr | Matt Billings |
| 2020 | No champions crowned due to the COVID-19 pandemic | | | | | |
| 2019 | Ryan Arbuthnot | Ryan Scott | Michael Dillon | Andrew Leraux | Evan Reynolds | |
| 2018 | Danny O'Brien | Ryan Scott | Tyler Bushey | Domonic Merkley | Xavier Perrin | |
| 2017 | Luke Whitteker | Dylan Evoy | Tyler Bushey | Dylan Kirkland | Alex Gagnon | |
| 2016 | Danny O'Brien | Shane Pecore | Alex Gagnon | Bob Ray | Derek Cryderman | |
| 2015 | Danny O'Brien | Dylan Evoy | John Gifford | Jamie Truelove | Madison Mulder | |
| 2014 | Danny O'Brien | Shane Pecore | Kevin Fetterly Jr. | Corbin Millar | | |
| 2013 | Lee Gill | Shane Pecore | Kevin Fetterly Jr. | Quincey Roberts | Vintage | |
| 2012 | Kyle Dingwall | Chris Herbison | Kevin Fetterly Jr. | Dwight Feltham | Paul Billings | |
| 2011 | Danny O'Brien | Chris Herbison | Kevin Fetterly Jr. | Jean-Marc Larose | Wayne Riddell | |
| 2010 | Pat O'Brien | Dylan Evoy | Kevin Fetterly Jr. | Jean Marc Larose | Jason Powers | |
| 2009 | Danny O'Brien | Matt Billings | Steve Billings | Steve Barber | Paul Billings | |
| 2008 | Danny O'Brien | Chris Raabe | Steve Billings | Josh Kane | Bob Botting | |
| 2007 | Danny O'Brien | Randy Earl | Bill Code | Jessica Power | Ben Tucker | |
| 2006 | Danny O'Brien | Chris Raabe | Bill Code | Josh Kane | Clay NcNamee | |
| 2005 | Pat O'Brien | Marcel Pecore | Bill Code | Steve Smith | | |
| 2004 | Steve Paine & Danny O'Brien† | Kyle Dingwall | Dana Aikins | Bill Woodward Jr. | | |
| 2003 | Lee Gill | Ben Tucker | Pete Stapper | Kurtis McPhee | | |
| 2002 | Lee Gill | Adam Moore | Robin Perrin | Rosco Garreau | Pro Stock | |
| 2001 | Lee Gill | Randy Gaudet | John Mulder | Kees Vanwinden | Randy Earl | |
| 2000 | Lee Gill | Ben Tucker | Terry McCullough | | Mark Therrien | |
| 1999 | Danny O'Brien | Randy Gaudet | Roger Bushey | | Mark Therrien | |
| 1998 | Paul Moreland | Randy Gaudet | Brent Moulton | | Randy Earl | |
| 1997 | Pat O'Brien | George McIntyre | Chris Curran | | Daryl Steele | |
| 1996 | Rick Wilson | Dennis Larocque | Dale Brown | | Daryl Steele | |
| 1995 | Danny O'Brien | Bob Thurston Jr. | Bob Botting | | Chris Herbison | |
| 1994 | Danny O'Brien | Sylvain Latulippe | Daryl Steele | | Steve Side | |
| 1993 | Danny O'Brien | | | | | |
| 1992 | Danny O'Brien | | | | | |
| 1991 | Track closed | | | | | |
| 1990 | Track closed | | | | | |
| 1989 | Track closed | | | | | |
| 1988 | Track closed | | | | | |
| 1987 | Pat O'Brien | | | | | |
| 1986 | Randy Ritskes | | | | | |
| 1985 | Track closed | | | | | |
| 1984 | Bob McCreadie | | | | | |
| 1983 | Marcel LaFrance | | | | | |
| 1982 | No Info | | | | | |
| 1981 | Track closed | | | | | |

†Paine drove a Big Block car, and O'Brien drove a Small Block, therefore named champions of each class.

== See also ==
- Dirt track racing
- Dirt track racing in Canada
- Modified stock car racing
- Short track motor racing
- Auto racing
- Race track
