= Bridgeport Motorsports Park =

Racetrack

Coordinates: 39°49′09″N 75°19′04″W

The Fastest Dirt Track in the East
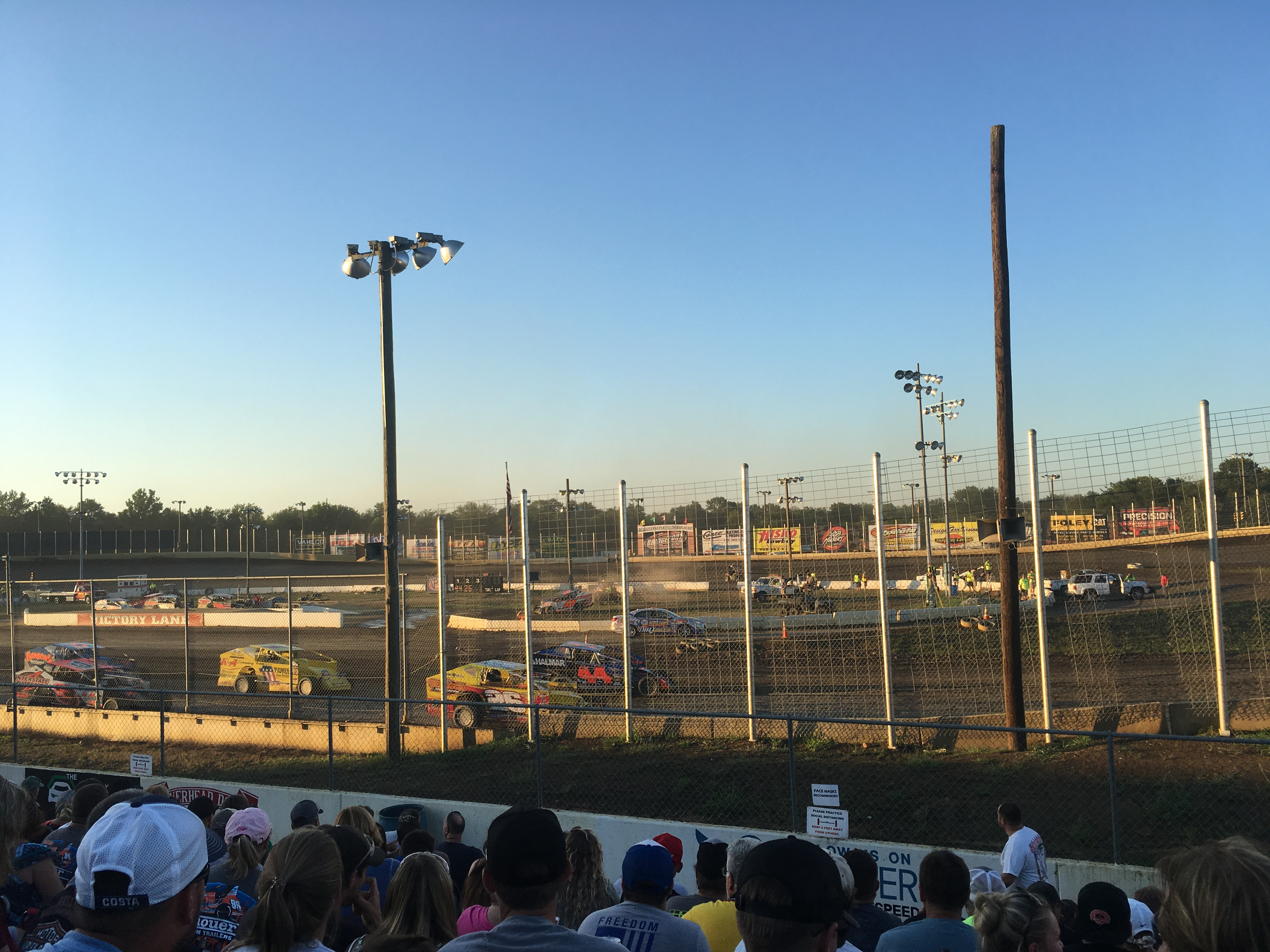
- Modified heat race at Bridgeport Motorsports Park in 2020
- Location: Bridgeport, New Jersey
- Owner: Doug Rose
- Major events: Super DIRTcar Series; World of Outlaws sprint cars

3/8 Mile outer Oval
- Surface: Clay
- Length: 0.37 mi (0.60 km)
- Turns: 4

1/4 Mile inner Oval
- Surface: Clay
- Length: 0.25 mi (0.40 km)
- Turns: 4

5/8 Mile outer Oval (obsolete)
- Surface: clay
- Length: 0.62 mi (1.00 km)
- Turns: 4

Bridgeport Motorsports Park is a dirt speedway located in the community of Bridgeport in Logan Township, Gloucester County, New Jersey, that consists of a high banked, progressive 4/10 mile 0.375-mile (0.604 km) and a 1/4 mile 0.25-mile (0.40 km) oval located within the bigger track. The Super DIRTcar Series races at the track. Jason Leffler died in an accident at the track in 2013.

== History ==
Doug Hoffman owned the track until his death in 2013. A team ran the track until Doug Rose was named the owner in 2019. Rose saw the construction of a new 4/10 mile outer track before the 2020 season.

== Weekly racing divisions ==
The speedway features big block modifieds, crate/sportsman modifieds, and street stocks every Saturday night throughout the racing season. In addition, sprint cars race at Bridgeport Motorsports Park on various dates during the racing season. Bridgeport Motorsports Park features other racing divisions including slingshots, mod lites, stage-1 mods, and vintage cars.

== Special events ==
The Super DIRTcar Series holds an annual event at the track. The World of Outlaws sprint cars were scheduled to race at the track in 2018 for the first time in 15 years but the event rained out. The series ran on the track in 2019 and it was won by Danny Dietrich. The USAC Midgets held their first race at Bridgeport on August 5, 2021; Tanner Thorson won the event.

== Gallery ==
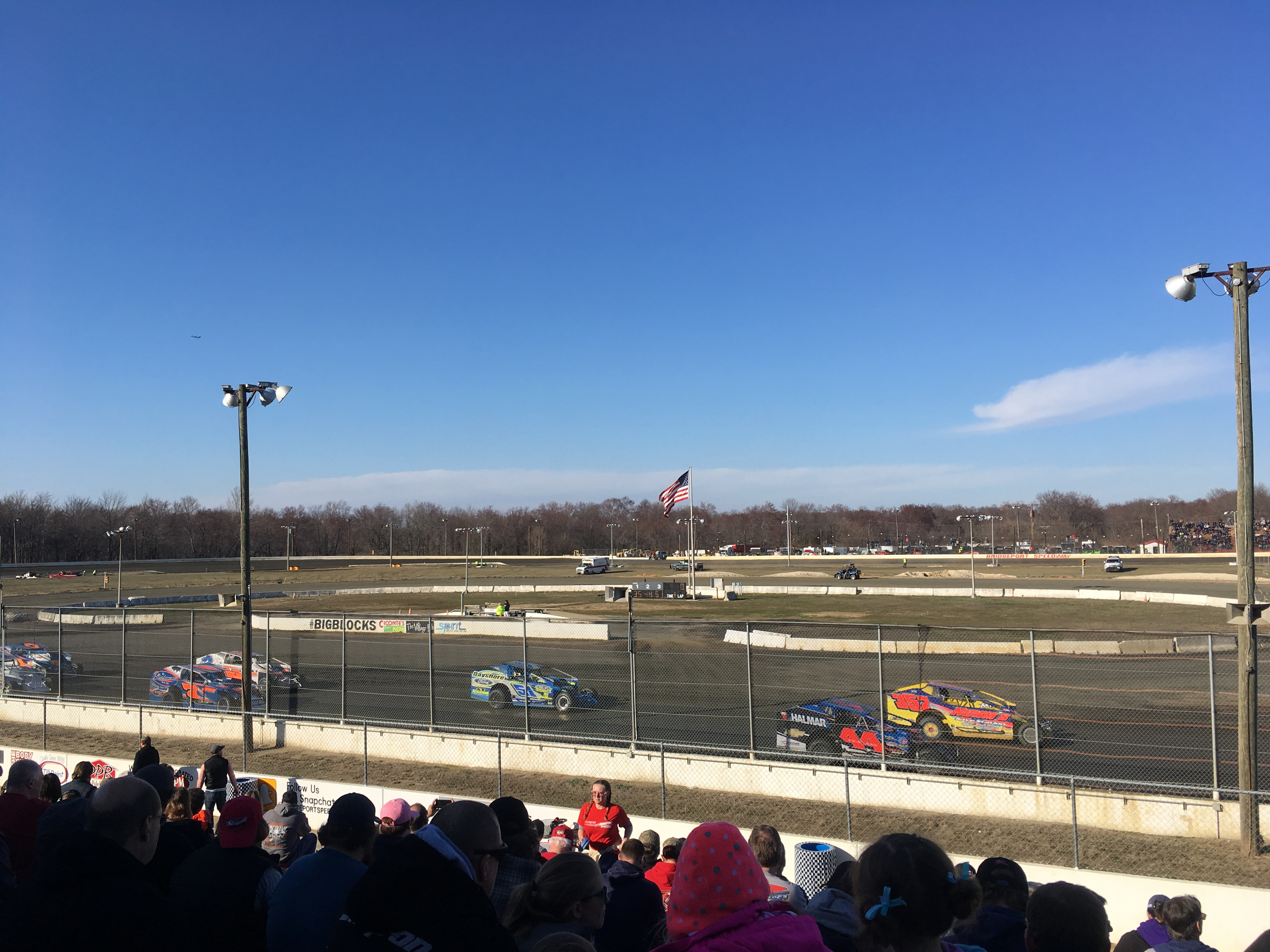
Modified heat race at Bridgeport Motorsports Park in 2018, before track was reconfigured from 5/8-mile oval to 3/8-mile oval

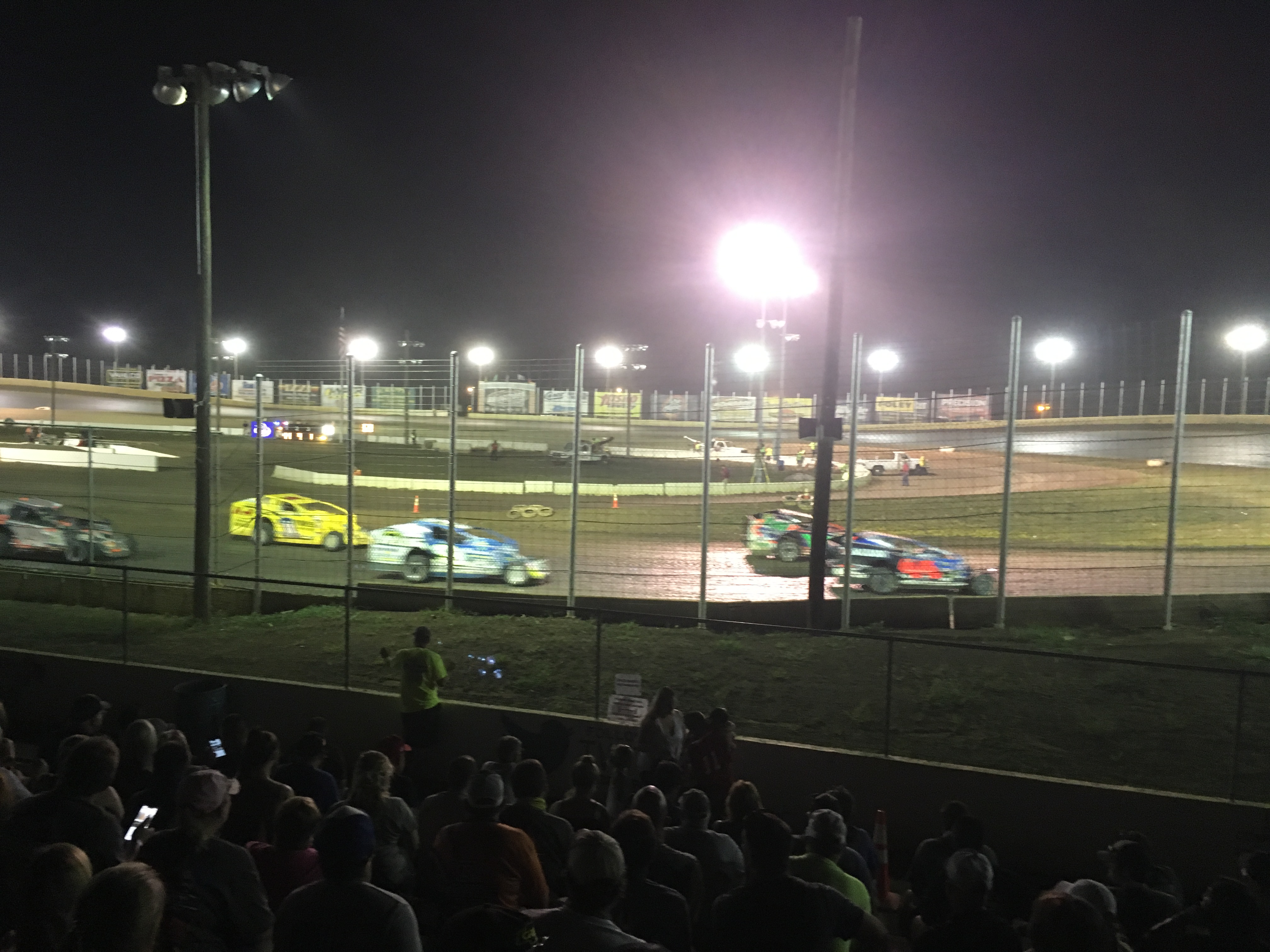
Modified feature at Bridgeport Motorsports Park in 2020
