= Fulton Speedway =

Motorsport venue in Brewerton, New York

Coordinates: 43.280°N 76.384°W

- Location: Fulton, New York
- Owner: John and Laura Wight
- Opened: 1961
- Former names: Mil-Ray Raceway
- Website: www.fultonspeedway.com

Oval
- Surface: Clay
- Length: .6 km (0.37 mi)
- Turns: 4
- Banking: High bank

Fulton Speedway is a 3/8th mile high bank dirt oval raceway in Volney, New York. The track was built into a hilly area on the banks of the Oswego River in a natural bowl, with seating high above the track, on a hill.

== History ==
Millard “Bub” Benway and his brother Ray used their construction business, Benway Bros. Construction, to build a 1/3 mile paved oval under the name Mil-Ray Raceway. The first event was held June 24th, 1961, and a 1/8 mile dragstrip began operations on July 15, 1962, and ran for a decade. Veteran driver Dutt Yanni captured the first track championship.

Asphalt racing was on the weekly schedule until 1978. The track was reopened as a 3/8 mile dirt oval in 1979.

in July 1998, Harvey, Joan, and David Fink purchased the track. Since 2009, the track, along with the Brewerton Speedway, has been owned by John and Laura Wight. The Wights previously owned the Can-Am Speedway.

== Outlaw 200 ==
In 1986, Benway presented a 200-lap event, featuring small-block modifieds, dubbing it the Victoria 200 in honor of his recently deceased wife. The event grew to be one of the most prestigious Modified races in the Northeast, and while motor rules were opened up to include big-block engines for a period, in 2023 the race returned to its roots as a small-block program.

Outlaw/Victoria 200: Winners list
Year	Winner	Year	Winner
1986	Billy Pauch	2012	Pat Ward
1987	Billy Pauch	2013	Jimmy Phelps
1988	Billy Pauch	2014	Matt Sheppard
1989	Billy Pauch	2015	Billy Decker
1990	Billy Pauch	2016	Jimmy Phelps
1991	Frank Cozze	2017	Billy Decker
1992	Tom Kinsella	2018	Jimmy Phelps
1993	Paul Jensen	2019	Mike Maresca
1994	Dale Planck	2021	Mat Williamson
1995	Tom Kinsella	2022	Matt Sheppard
1996	Kenny Brightbill	2023	Matt Sheppard
1997	Billy Pauch	2024	Mat Williamson
1998	Tim Fuller	2025	Mat Williamson
1999	Alan Johnson	2026	Felix Roy
2000	Danny Johnson		
2001	Alan Johnson		
2002	Alan Johnson		
2003	Alan Johnson		
2004	Tim Fuller		
2005	Tim Fuller		
2006	Danny Johnson		
2007	Billy Decker		
2008	Danny Johnson		
2009	Billy Decker		
2010	Brett Hearn		
