= Utica-Rome Speedway =

Oval raceway in New York

Coordinates: 43.0786°N 75.5162°W

- Location: Vernon, New York
- Owner: Jason Broedel
- Opened: 1961
- Former names: New Venture International Speedway
- Website: www.uticaromespeedway.com

Oval
- Surface: Clay
- Length: .8 km (0.50 mi)
- Turns: 4

Utica-Rome Speedway is a half-mile dirt oval raceway in Vernon, New York. It is known as the “Home of Heroes” and has been the home track of several NASCAR national champions.

== History ==
The Utica-Rome Speedway was built in 1961 by Joe Lesik as a flat quarter-mile asphalt track. The asphalt was torn up in 1979 when the track was enlarged to five-eighths of a mile before settling at its current length in the late 1980s. Over the years since, the facility has featured several other smaller track configurations, the most used of which being an inner oval for kart racing. This configuration existed between 2000 and 2002, but it has also returned in recent years. Since promoter Brett Deyo and his company, BD Motorsports Media LLC, took over promotion of the track in 2021, the inner oval has made a return, hosting kart races on a biweekly basis throughout the season. The track's nickname changed as well as a result of this. Before Deyo, the track was often colloquially and promotionally referred to as "The Fast Track of the East" or “The Action Track of the East” but has since dropped both monikers. As of the 2025 race season, Jason Broedel has assumed ownership and done multiple improvements to the facility.

== National Champions ==
The inaugural 1961 as well as the 1962 track championships were claimed by Rene Charland, who went on to become the only driver to win four consecutive NASCAR Sportsman Division championships (predecessor of the Xfinity Series). Two-time national Sportsman Division champion Bill Wimble claimed track championships in 1966 and 1967.

NASCAR Hall of Fame inductee and 6 time NASCAR national modified champion Jerry Cook was the 1969 track champion, while fellow inductee and 9-time national champion Richie Evans won the track championships in 1972, 1973, 1974, and 1978.

Geoff Bodine, the 1986 Daytona 500 winner, was a 1977 track champion. Perennial NASCAR Truck Series contender Stewart Friesen won the track championships in 2004, 2007 and then 5 consecutive times from 2010 to 2014.

== Weekly Divisions ==
As of 2024, on a weekly basis, the speedway offers five divisions of competition. The track's premiere weekly division is the Modifieds, the same car used in both the Super DIRTcar Series and the Short Track Super Series. Unlike some other tracks and touring series, Utica-Rome permits both big-block and small-block modified configurations to compete together. The most populous division is the Crate 602 Sportsman division, often boasting 30-40 car fields week in and week out. These cars all use the exact same 375-horsepower GM Crate engine, theoretically making it much easier to get into and be competitive in as opposed to a Modified or a Sprint Car. The third and final major division of competition is the Pro Stock division (not to be confused with a Pro Stock dragster), a full-fendered, purpose-built car that very much resembles a late model Stock car on dirt. The final two divisions include the Limited Sportsman, a rookie class for inexperienced Sportsman racers, and the Four-Cylinders, which are essentially front-wheel drive street cars with some safety modifications.

== Special Events ==
Over the years, the track has hosted a wealth of special races and played host to stops for multiple national touring series. For example, the World of Outlaw Late Model Series visited the track in July 2011, which was won by multi-time series champion and New York native Tim McCreadie. McCreadie also has a Modified win at the speedway in 2010. Several Sprint Car touring series also visit the track. The All Star Circuit of Champions series hosted an event there each year from 2019-2023. Regional Sprint Car series such as the Empire Super Sprints and the Capital Region Sprint Association also make at least one visit per year. High Limit Racing, the national sprint car series spearheaded by NASCAR champion Kyle Larson as well as sprint car superstar Brad Sweet, visited the speedway for the first time on May 17, 2024, with Rico Abreu picking up the $12,000 victory, and are scheduled to return in 2025 on May 17.

=== New Yorker ===
First contested in 1963, the New Yorker has been a staple on the Utica-Rome schedule. Lou Lazzaro was declared the first winner, although fellow Hall of Fame driver Bob Rossell was first to cross the finish line in the 1963 New Yorker 400. Rossell’s win was reversed when NASCAR determined fellow driver Rene Charland had pushed Rossell across the line when he ran out of gas. Legend is that Lazzaro and Rossell eventually split first place money amongst themselves. It has taken several iterations over the years, with the race distance being changed several times, including as a 200-lap and a 100-lap event previously, but the New Yorker name has stuck. Its current iteration is a 50-lap race contested by the Short Track Super Series modifieds.

New Yorker: Winners list
Date	Winner	Date	Winner
1963	Lou Lazzaro	2010	Bobby Varin
1964	Ed Flemke	2011	Bobby Varin
1965	Rene Charland	2014	Larry Wight
1966	Bill Wimble	2015	Matt Sheppard
1967	Jean-Paul Cabana	2016	Matt Sheppard
1968	Lou Lazzaro	2017	Stewart Friesen
1969	Lou Lazzaro	2018	Matt Sheppard
1970	Ed Flemke	2021	Stewart Friesen
1971	Richie Evans	2022	Stewart Friesen
1972	Richie Evans	2023	Matt Sheppard
1973	Maynard Troyer	2024	Matt Sheppard
1974	Geoff Bodine	2025	Alex Yankowski
1978	Richie Evans		
1990	Billy Pauch		
1991	Billy Pauch		
1992	Dale Planck		
1993	Billy Pauch		
2007	Stewart Friesen		
2008	Bobby Varin		
2009	Steve Paine		
