= Merrittville Speedway =

Racetrack

Canada's Longest Running Dirt Track
- Location: 2371 Merrittville Highway; Thorold, Ontario; Canada
- Coordinates: 43.0774°N 79.2553°W
- Owner: Pete Bicknell
- Operator: Don Spiece
- Opened: July 1, 1952
- Architect: John Marino and George Cullen
- Major events: 327 Spec Novice Modified’s, DIRTcar Sportsman Series, Action Sprint Tour, Southern Ontario Sprints, Empire Super Sprints, Patriot Sprint Tour

D-Shaped Oval
- Surface: Clay
- Length: 0.375 mi (0.604 km)

Merrittville Speedway is a 3/8 mile dirt short track motor racing oval, located 20 minutes west of Niagara Falls, in Thorold, Ontario, Canada. The track hosts a weekly Saturday night program that runs from April to September each year and features stock car, sprint car and modified races.

== History ==
The speedway is known as the oldest operating race track in Canada as it has been in continuous operation since it opened on July 1, 1952.

New ownership took over the track in 2017 and it celebrated its seventieth anniversary in 2021.

== Speedway classes ==
The tracks weekly racing program features six classes of racing:

- 327 Modifieds
- Sportsman
- Stocks
- 4 Cylinders
- Modified Lites

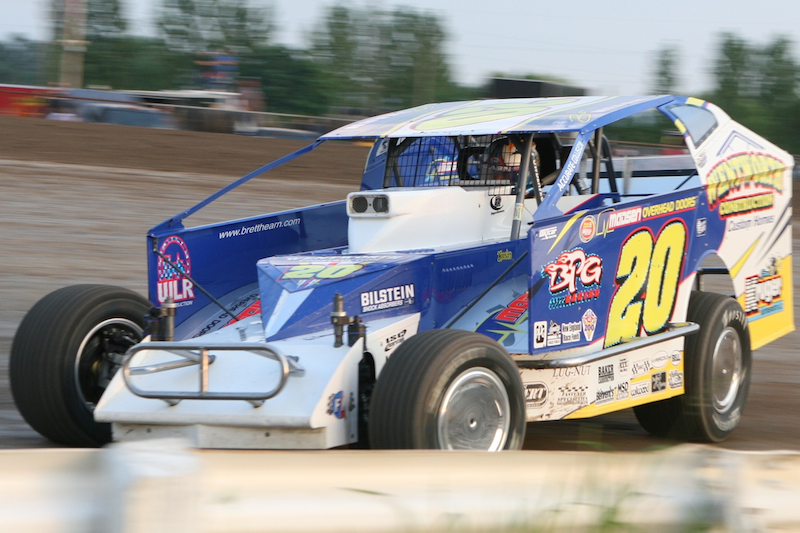
A dirt modified at Merrittville

The track has also regularly featured touring series including the Super DIRTcar Series, World of Outlaws Late Model Series, UMP Modifieds, DIRTcar Sportsman Series, Action Sprint Tour, Southern Ontario Sprints, Empire Super Sprints and the Patriot Sprint Tour.

The track also hosts a weekly karting series on Tuesday nights.

== See also ==
- List of dirt track ovals in Canada
- Humberstone Speedway
- Ohsweken Speedway
