= Brett Hearn =

American modified and stock car racing driver

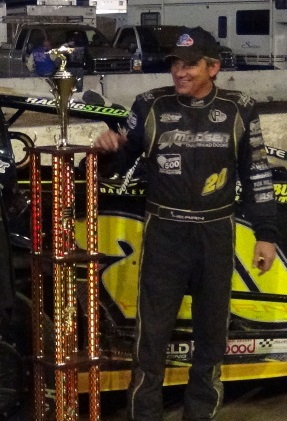
- Hearn in 2012
- Nationality: American
- Born: September 1, 1958 (age 68) Paterson, New Jersey, U.S.

Super DIRTcar Series career
- Debut season: 1975
- Current team: Madsen Overhead Doors
- Car number: 20
- Crew chief
- Championships: 79
- Wins: 920

Championship titles
- 1992, 2001 1990, 1993, 1996, 2001, 2007, 2009, 2013 2006 1990, 1993, 1996, 1997*, 2012, 2013, 2014, 2015 1990, 1992 1989, 1990 2006 2007, 2008 1982, 1988: New York State Fair Champion; Super DIRTcar Series Mr. DIRT 358 Modified Champion; Mr. Dirt Modified Champion Sunoco Racing Fuels DIRT Championship Trail; DIRT-Asphalt Challenge Series; Mr. Dirt 358 (Eastern Region); Mr. DIRTcar (Northeast Region); Canadian-American Challenge Series

Awards
- 1986, 2002, 2007, 2012 1993 2020: Eastern Motorsports Press Association Driver of the Year; Champion Spark Plug DIRT Motorsports Driver of the Year; Northeast Dirt Modified Hall of Fame

NASCAR O'Reilly Auto Parts Series career
- 20 races run over 5 years
- Best finish: 41st (1986)
- First race: 1985 Budweiser 200 (Dover)
- Last race: 1989 Goody's 300 (Daytona)
Wins	Top tens	Poles
0	1	0

Brett Hearn (born September 1, 1958) is a semi-retired modified stock car driver from Kinnelon, New Jersey. He currently serves as race director at Orange County Fair Speedway

Hearn has amassed 919 wins in a stock car over the course of his professional career which has spanned four decades. He won his first-ever Modified feature event at Nazareth Speedway and was the last Modified driver to score a win on the half-mile track because weeks later, the track was torn down to make way for a strip mall and grocery store. He competed in twenty NASCAR Busch Series events in his career, spanning from 1985 to 1989, using the same chassis in every race. He earned just one top-ten: a tenth at Dover International Speedway and earned his best points finish of 41st in 1986.

== Career highlights ==
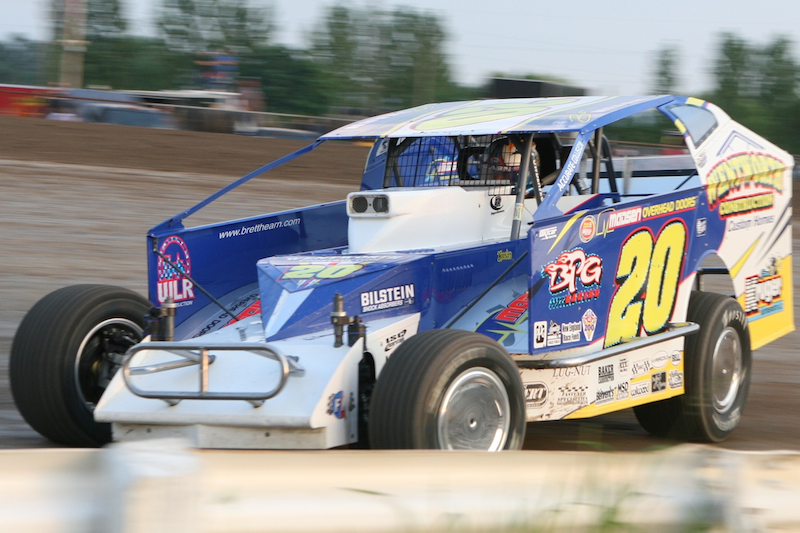
Hearn in 2008

920 Wins—574 Modified, 343 Small- Block Modified, 2 Sprint Car
363 Wins in races 50 laps or longer
Wins at 49 tracks in eleven states and two Canadian provinces
79 Track and Series Championships
All-Time Winner Orange County Fair Speedway 302 Wins (174 Modified) (112 Small-Block Modified) (2 Sprint Car)
All-Time Winner Albany-Saratoga Speedway 108 Wins
Hearn has won races at 49 different racetracks in 10 states and 2 provinces.

== Personal life ==
Born in Paterson, New Jersey to parents Gordon and Kay, Hearn got his first taste of racing when he was eight-years old at the Orange County Fair Speedway in Middletown, New York. Brett began driving go-karts and when he turned 16, his father Gordon encouraged Brett to try stock car racing. His dad bought a car from Glen Carlson and the Hearn's built the engine in their family room. Hearn crashed his No. 20 blue-and-silver Pinto-body car the first time out and a number of other times.

Hearn currently resides in Vernon Township, New Jersey. He has two children, Brooke (born 4/11/92) Tyler (born 6/18/95). He is the owner of BH Enterprises, Inc. which consists of his racing team, fabrication shop, driving school and performance equipment manufacturer. Besides racing his other hobbies and interests include jet skiing, golfing and fishing.

== Motorsports career results ==
=== Career championships ===
Championship	Year
Super DIRT Series Champion (1998-2010 aka Mr. Dirt)	1990, 1993, 1996, 2001, 2007, 2009, 2013
Mr. Dirt Modified Champion	1990, 1993, 1996, 1997*, 2012, 2013, 2014, 2015
Mr. Dirt 358 Modified Series Champion	2006
Sunoco Racing Fuels DIRT Championship Trail	1990, 1992
DIRT-Asphalt Challenge Series	1989, 1990
DIRT MotorSports 358 Modified Eastern Regional Champion	2006
DIRTcar Northeast Modified Region Champion	2007, 2008
Canadian-American Challenge Series	1982, 1988
Tri-Track Series	1982
Twin-Track Series	1989
Lebanon Valley Speedway Modified Division	1997, 2002, 2003, 2004, 2005, 2010, 2012, 2013, 2014, 2015, 2016, 2017
Lebanon Valley Speedway 358 Modified Division	2004, 2010
Orange County Fair Speedway Modified Division	1979, 1980, 1983, 1984, 1986, 1987, 1989, 1990, 1991, 1992, 1993, 1994, 1995, 1999, 2006, 2019
Orange County Fair Speedway 358 Modified Division	1977, 1987, 1989, 1990, 1991, 1992, 1999, 2006
Albany-Saratoga Speedway (358) Modified Champion	2002, 2004, 2005, 2006, 2012, 2013, 2014, 2018
Fonda Speedway Go Green NMX Thunder Series Champion	2008
Rolling Wheels Raceway Modified Division	1991, 1998
Utica-Rome (New Venture) Speedway Modified Division	1986
Utica-Rome (New Venture) Speedway 358 Modified Division	1986
Accord Speedway Modified Division	2011
Nazareth Raceway Sportsman Division	1977
DIRT Florida Tour Champion	1998, 2000, 2001, 2002, 2005**, 2006, 2008***

=== NASCAR ===
(key) (Bold – Pole position awarded by qualifying time. Italics – Pole position earned by points standings or practice time. * – Most laps led.)

==== Busch Series ====
NASCAR Busch Series results
Year	Team	No.	Make	1	2	3	4	5	6	7	8	9	10	11	12	13	14	15	16	17	18	19	20	21	22	23	24	25	26	27	28	29	30	31	NBSC	Pts	Ref
1985	Brett Hearn	20	Pontiac	DAY	CAR	HCY	BRI	MAR	DAR	SBO	LGY	DOV; 10	CLT	SBO	HCY	ROU	IRP	SBO	LGY	HCY	MLW	BRI	DAR	RCH	NWS	ROU	CLT; 36	HCY	CAR; 29	MAR					63rd	189	
1986	Brett Hearn	20	Pontiac	DAY; 14	CAR; 16	HCY	MAR	BRI	DAR	SBO	LGY	JFC	DOV; 22	CLT; 22	SBO	HCY	ROU	IRP	SBO	RAL	OXF	SBO	HCY	LGY	ROU	BRI	DAR	RCH	DOV; 20	MAR	ROU	CLT; 25	CAR; 14	MAR	41st	518	
1987	Brett Hearn	20	Ford	DAY; 41	HCY	MAR	DAR	BRI	LGY	SBO	CLT	DOV; 34	IRP	ROU	JFC	OXF	SBO	HCY	RAL	LGY	ROU	BRI	JFC	DAR	RCH	DOV; 29	MAR	CLT	CAR	MAR					50th	177	
1988	Brett Hearn	20	Buick	DAY; 32	HCY	CAR; 26	MAR	DAR; 22	BRI	LNG	NZH; 15	SBO	NSV	CLT; 41	DOV; 21	ROU	LAN	LVL	MYB	OXF	SBO	HCY	LNG	IRP	ROU	BRI	DAR	RCH	DOV	MAR	CLT	CAR	MAR		50th	410	
1989	Brett Hearn	20	Pontiac	DAY; 25	CAR	MAR	HCY	DAR	BRI	NZH	SBO	LAN	NSV	CLT; DNQ	DOV	ROU	LVL	VOL	MYB	SBO	HCY	DUB	IRP	ROU	BRI	DAR	RCH	DOV	MAR	CLT	CAR	MAR			86th	88	
