= Ransomville Speedway =

Motorsport venue in Ransomville, New York

- Location: Ransomville, New York
- Coordinates: 43°15′42″N 78°55′30″W
- Owner: Parm Atwal
- Operator: Dave DiPietro
- Opened: 1958
- Website: www.ransomvillespeedway.com

Oval
- Surface: Clay
- Length: .8 km (0.50 mi)
- Turns: 4
- Banking: Semi-banked

Little R
- Surface: Dirt
- Length: .1 km (0.062 mi)
- Turns: 4

Ransomville Speedway is a one-half mile semi-banked high-speed dirt oval raceway located ten miles from the Canadian-American border in Western New York.

== Overview ==
Hall of Fame race driver Ed Ortiz and fifteen friends, self proclaimed the Slowpoke Club, got into racing by building the original Ransomville Speedway on property behind the Ortiz family car dealership in 1954. When land became available outside of town the Slowpoke Club formed a corporation, sold shares of stock, and passed the hat at races to come up with the down payment. A local woman advanced the money for the rest of the cost and held the mortgage and the Ransomville Speedway opened at its current location in 1958.

When the track became available in 1972, Canadian Stan Friesen, the 1969 track champion, along with a partner acquired it. Friesen also owned the nearby Merrittville Speedway in Ontario, Canada. The track remained in the Friesen family until 2015 when it was purchased by Parm Atwal, whose family was an active sponsor of races at the track. In 2024 Dave DiPietro Sr. was named the speedway's general manager.

== Events ==
The facility offers go-kart racing every Thursday night in the summer. On Friday nights, action moves to the "Big R" and includes five racing classes: Modified 358's, Sportsman, Novice Sportsman, Street Stocks and Mini-stocks.

Each New Year's Day the track runs the Hangover 150 Enduro. Unseasonably warm (46 degrees) weather in 2007 brought out a standing-room-only crowd and 244 entrants. Classes for four-, six- and eight-cylinder cars run 50 laps each.
