= Can-Am Speedway =

Dirt oval raceway in LaFargeville, New York, US

Coordinates: 44.200430°N 75.951417°W

- Location: LaFargeville, New York
- Owner: Tyler Bartlett
- Opened: 1974
- Former names: Can-Am Motorsports Park; Can-Am International Speedway
- Website: www.racecanam.com

Oval
- Surface: Clay
- Length: .8 km (0.50 mi)
- Turns: 4
- Banking: Semi-banked

Kart track
- Surface: Dirt
- Length: .32 km (0.20 mi)
- Turns: 4

Can-Am Speedway is a half-mile dirt oval raceway located in La Fargeville, Town of Orleans, New York. Located just a few miles from the Thousand Islands on New York State Route 411, it draws competitors and fans from both sides of the Canada–United States border.

== Overview ==
The Can-Am Speedway was built in 1974 by an Evans Mills, New York real estate broker, Leslie W. Brown. The track lasted one year under this ownership and Brown filed for bankruptcy.

Early in 1975, a group of Watertown Speedway investors purchased the track, that consisted of Bob Thurston Sr., Douglas Atkinson, and Thomas Coughlin. This partnership lasted for several seasons. In 1981, Bob Thurston Sr. bought out Mr. Atkinson and Mr. Coughlin, and became the sole owner. The Thurston family continued to own the track during the glory years of the 1980s and 1990s. Thurston was responsible for bringing Can-Am under the DIRTcar racing banner during the winter of 1982–83. The Thurston family did a remarkable job with the speedway, even after the rebuilding of the VIP towers after a vicious storm hit the track in 1995. The Thurston's faced some pretty tough decisions at the time but decided to repair the damage. With the help of many people around the racing community, the track was back up and running in just three weeks. The Thurston family owned the speedway until late in the 2000 season.

John Wight, of Baldwinsville, New York, purchased the track in the summer of 2000. Wight introduced the Big Block Modifieds as the top class at the speedway. Wight continued ownership of the speedway, even though attendance and car counts were down from previous seasons. Wight also owned and sponsored cars driven by Billy Decker, Pat Ward and Pat O'Brien.

Wight would eventually sell the track to Charlie and Billy Caprara from the F.X. Caprara car companies late in the 2003 season. Wight would continue to me a major player in racing with ownership of both the Brewerton and Fulton Speedways in upstate New York, as well as a Big Block Modified team still consisting of Ward, and Larry Wight, his son. Caprara's ownership of the Can-Am Speedway saw several changes to the speedway. The track became known as Caprara Bros. Can-Am Motorsports Park. The Caprara's also operated the Thunder Alley Speed Park, which is just a few miles down the road from Can-Am.

The Caprara's continued to own Can-Am through the end of the 2009 season. Just a couple of months into the off season, the track was sold to longtime racer, and Rochester businessman, Tiger Chapman. Chapman was originally from nearby Cape Vincent, New York, and still has a home in the town. In 2017, operations returned to the Caprara family, and the 358 Modifieds headlined the Saturday night events.

In December 2017 it was announced that the Can-Am Speedway had been sold to driver Tyler Bartlett. In 2025 the track announced its first Hall of Fame induction ceremony.

== Events ==
The Can-Am Speedway offers auto racing every Friday night throughout the summer season. The track features the DIRTcar sanctioned 358-Modifieds, Sportsman and Limited Sportsman, Thundercar, and Crate Sprint Cars.
