= Cornwall Motor Speedway =

Dirt racing track in Ontario, Canada

Coordinates: 45.0527°N 74.7983°W

- Location: 16981 Cornwall Centre Road; Cornwall, Ontario; K6J 5Y2
- Owner: Raymond Lavergne; Jacques Lavergne
- Operator: Raymond Lavergne
- Broke ground: 1969
- Opened: 1970
- Construction cost: Unknown
- Architect: Ralph Hurley
- Former names: Power Dam Speedway
- Major events: World of Outlaws Sprint Car Series (2012-2014); World of Outlaws Late Model Series (2008-2010, 2013); Super DIRTcar Series; ODLM Late Models; Lucas Oil Canadian Dirt Tour; ESS Sprints; Patriot Sprints; SOS Sprints

Oval
- Surface: Clay
- Length: 0.25 mi (0.40 km)
- Turns: 4
- Banking: 25 degrees (approx.)

Track Records
- Race lap record: 10.246 sec. (Lucas Wolfe, World of Outlaw Sprint Car, July 29, 2012)
- Race lap record: 10.90 (Jared Zimbardi, 360 Sprint Car, date unknown)
- Race lap record: 12.77 (Brain "Slim" McDonald, Small Block Modified, July 1, 2013)

The Cornwall Motor Speedway is a 1/4 mile dirt track near the community of Cornwall, Ontario, Canada. It is located northwest of the city on Cornwall Centre Road. The track opened in 1970 and runs weekly racing on Sunday evenings.

Weekly race classes include modified, sportsman, pro stock, semi pro and mini stock. Yearly special event shows feature the Big Block Modifieds, sprint cars and late models.

== Past track champions ==
Year	Modified	Sportsman	Pro Stock	Mini Stock	Novice Sportsman
2022	Chris Raabe	Chane Pecore	Marc Lalonde	Alexis Charbonneau	Daphne Hebert
2021	Corey Wheeler	Ryan Stabler	Dave Seguin	Alexis Charbonneau	Tristan Ladouceur #92T
2020	No champions crowned due to the COVID-19 pandemic				
2019	Corey Wheeler	Shane Pecore	Stéphane Lebrun	Justin Jodoin	
2018	Carey Terrance	Shane Pecore	CD Beauchamp	Chris James	
2017	Chris Raabe	Justin Lalancette	George Renaud	Marc Dagenais	Semi Pro
2016	Chris Raabe	Shane Pecore	Stephane Lebrun	Bob Ray	Junior Delormier
2015	Carey Terrance	Corey Wheeler	Dave Bissonnette	J-F Page	Derek Cryderman
2014	Carey Terrance	Corey Wheeler	Dave Bissonnette	Chris James	Junior Delormier
2013	Mario Clair	Joey Ladouceur	Dave Bissonnette	Steve Billings	Mike Gaucher
2012	Dale Planck	Chris Herbison	Joey Ladouceur	Martin Bernard	Bennoit Dubois
2011	Stephane Lafrance	Chris Herbison	Joey Ladouceur	Ernie Cree	Kevin Fetterly Jr
2010	Laurent Ladouceur	Chris Raabe	Joey Ladouceur	Ronnie Tyo	Gaetan Amesse
2009	Kyle Dingwall				
2008	Carey Terrance				
2007					
2006	Kyle Dingwall				
2005	Dale Planck				
2005	Dale Planck				

== See also ==
- Dirt track racing
- Dirt track racing in Canada
