= Brewerton Speedway =

Motorsport venue in Brewerton, New York

Coordinates: 43°14′43.09″N 76°8′18.75″W

- Location: Brewerton, New York
- Owner: John and Laura Wight
- Opened: 1949
- Website: www.brewertonspeedway.com

Oval
- Surface: Clay
- Length: .53 km (0.33 mi)
- Turns: 4

Brewerton Speedway is a 1/3rd mile D-shaped dirt oval raceway in Brewerton, New York. It is considered one of the oldest jewels of the robust Central New York racing scene.

== History ==
The Brewerton Speedway was built as a ¼ mile clay racetrack in 1949 by Vere Bradbury and Don Georgia, who sold it to Al Richardson. The first event was a dirt track midget car race. The track was paved in 1956, and the current 1/3 mile dirt oval opened in 1973.

Richardson remained owner until 1965, after which the racetrack went through a series of owners and promoters, as well as several years of inactivity. In 1994, Harvey, Joan, and David Fink purchased the track. Since 2009, the track, along with the Fulton Speedway, has been owned by John and Laura Wight. The Wights previously owned the Can-Am Speedway.

== Events ==
The Brewerton Speedway annually hosts the DIRTcar 358 Modified Series Hurricane 100 on the Thursday of Super Dirt Week.

On the last full weekend of September, the facility also hosts the Apple Festival, attracting 25,000 people annually. The Lioness Club of Central Square donates all proceeds from this event to communities on the north shore of Oneida Lake, southern Oswego, and northern Onondaga counties.
