= Fonda Speedway =

Dirt track racing venue in Fonda, New York, United States

Coordinates: 42.95311°N 74.3713369°W

Track of Champions
- Location: 21 South Bridge Street, Fonda, New York
- Owner: Montgomery County Agricultural Society
- Operator: BD Motorsports Media LLC (Brett Deyo)
- Opened: 1953
- Website: thefondaspeedway.com

half mile oval
- Surface: dirt
- Length: 0.50 mi (0.8 km)
- Race lap record: 17.740 (Stewart Friesen, 2021, Big Block Modified)

Fonda Speedway is a half-mile (0.8 km) dirt oval track located in Fonda, New York. The track hosted NASCAR Cup Series races in 1955 and 1966 to 1968. It is home to the Fonda 200. The track hosts Saturday night races with Modified, Sportsman, Limited Sportsman, Pro Stock, and 4 Cylinder classes (as of 2021).

== History ==
The track opened in 1953 as a half-mile dirt oval which it remains to this date. The track hosted NASCAR Cup Series races in 1955 and 1966 to 1968, two of which were won by Richard Petty, while David Pearson and Junior Johnson won the other two races. The track had an International Motor Contest Association (IMCA) class between 2000 and 2009. It switched to a United Midwestern Promoters (UMP) Modified class for one year in 2010. Brett Deyo took over as track promoter starting in 2019.

== Drag Strip ==
From 1957 til 1968 the track was home to an 1/8 mile drag strip that ran in the middle of the track's infield. Shirley Muldowney debuted on the drag strip. Muldowney described the drag strip: "That strip was deadly, deadly. You would go down the center of that dirt oval and when you would sail off that strip onto the oval, all four wheels would leave the ground."

== Notable alumni ==
- Stewart Friesen - 2012, 2013, 2014, and 2015 track Modified champion
- Shirley Muldowney
- Brett Hearn- Record-holder for most Fonda 200 victories with four, illustrious modified career with over 900 overall wins

== NASCAR Cup Series Results ==
Date	Winner	Manufacturer	Average Speed (mph)
June 18, 1955	Junior Johnson	Oldsmobile	58.413
July 14, 1966	David Pearson	Dodge	61.010
July 13, 1967	Richard Petty	Plymouth	65.826
July 11, 1968	Richard Petty	Plymouth	64.935
