= Land of Legends Raceway =

Dirt oval in Canandaigua, New York

- Location: 2820 County Road 10, Canandaigua, NY, 14424
- Coordinates: 42°53′41″N 77°14′59″W
- Owner: Ontario County Agricultural Society
- Operator: Paul Cole
- Opened: 1953
- Former names: Canandaigua Motorsports Park, Canandaigua Speedway
- Website: www.landoflegendsraceway.com
- Length: 0.50 mi (0.8 km)
- Turns: 4

Land of Legends Raceway is a 1/2-mile (0.80 km) dirt oval racing facility in the Finger Lakes Region of New York State. The track is located on and a part of the Ontario County Fairgrounds.

== Overview ==
In April 1953 the Ontario County Agricultural Society approved the use of the Canandaigua Fairgrounds for auto racing. Sanctioned by the National Auto Racing Association, the opening event was held that year on Memorial Day. The venue continued to host auto racing for more than a decade before going dormant. Bub Benway, promotor of the Fulton Speedway in Central New York, revived the racetrack in 1972.

A two-year lease by Dominick Tantalo was marred by a collapse of the grandstand in 1976, injuring over 60 people. Tantalo bought in several sections of portable bleachers for the remainer of the season, but then turned his attention to re-opening the Maple Grove Speedway in Waterloo, New York.

In 1978 the track began a three-decade tenure as a flagship of DIRT Motorsports when the organization's president, Glen Donnelly, negotiated to rebuild the grandstands. Veteran promoter Jermie Corcoran then took over the Fairgrounds' lease in 2011.

The facility has been promoted by Paul Cole since 2018.

== Events ==
The venue hosts auto racing every Saturday evening during the summer. The track features DIRT big-block modifieds, DIRT sportsman, 305 sprint cars and street stocks.

== Incidents ==
The track was the site where on August 9, 2014, NASCAR driver Tony Stewart collided with Kevin Ward, Jr., who was standing on track. Ward died from injuries sustained from the collision. The incident was investigated, with officials discovering Ward had competed while intoxicated by cannabinoids (marijuana). It led to World Racing Group, which sanctions selected races at the circuit, imposing drug testing.
