= Mohawk International Raceway =

Motorsport venue in Hogansburg, New York

- Location: Hogansburg, New York
- Coordinates: 44.9681°N 74.7062°W
- Operator: David Thompson
- Broke ground: 1985
- Opened: 1987
- Former names: Frogtown International Speedway
- Website: www.racemohawkdirt.com

Oval
- Surface: Clay
- Length: .644 km (0.400 mi)
- Turns: 4
- Banking: Semi-banked

Mohawk International Raceway is a four-tenths of a mile semi-banked high-speed dirt oval raceway located three miles from the Canadian-American border near Hogansburg, New York.

== Overview ==
In 1987 Dennis White completed a three-year effort to construct the Frogtown International Speedway in the Mohawk Nation at Akwesasne territory by holding its first racing event. Chiefs from both the recognized councils of the Canadian and American portions of the reservation conducted the opening ceremonies for over 2,500 fans. Because of its unique location, it became one of the first venues in the United States to offer onsite wagering for automobile races.

In 2008 the facility was rebranded the Mohawk International Raceway and the Nation approved a multi-million dollar investment in VIP booths, Musco Lighting, and other upgrades.

== Events ==
The facility offers racing every Saturday night in the summer, which includes five racing classes: Modified 358's, Sportsman, Pro Stocks, Limited Sportsman, and the Mini Stocks. It also hosts a variety of outdoor concerts, including the Smokefest Cannabis Festival.
