= Super DIRTcar Series =

American car racing series

- Category: Modified Racing
- Country: United States, Canada
- Affiliations: Mr. DIRTcar, Mr. DIRTcar 358
- Inaugural season: 1972
- Manufacturers: Bicknell, TEO, Troyer
- Tire suppliers: Hoosier
- Drivers' champion: Alex Yankowski
- Official website: superdirtcarseries.com

Big Block Modified Weekly Championship
- Drivers' champion: Marc Johnson

358 Modified Series
- Drivers' champion: Mat Williamson

358 Modified Weekly Championship
- Drivers' champion: Chris Raabe

The Super DIRTcar Series Big Block Modifieds is a North American big block modified touring series currently promoted by World Racing Group. The series primarily races on dirt ovals in the Northeastern United States and Canada along with select dates in Florida and North Carolina.

The cars feature big block V8 engines (up to 467 c.i.) that develops over 750 hp and a center-steer style chassis that weighs at least 2,500 lb with driver included.

== History ==
The series was founded in 1972 by Glenn Donnelly as a series of qualifier races for the inaugural Super Dirt Week at the New York State Fairgrounds Racetrack in Syracuse, New York. The series became a true points championship in 1974 that also awarded a points fund. Will Cagle won the first points championship in 1974 over two-time Super DIRT Week champion Buzzie Reutimann.

The series and Super Dirt Week grew in popularity along with corporate title sponsors & television coverage throughout the 1980s and 1990s. Past series title sponsors include Schaefer Beer (1972–1975 and 1978), CRC Industries (1979–1985), Sun Country Cooler (1986), U.S. Smokeless Tobacco Company (1987–1998) and Advance Auto Parts (1999–2008).

The series briefly included asphalt races on the championship trail from 1988 to 1992 at tracks such as Cayuga, Flemington, Nazareth, Oswego, Sanair and Thompson.

The series was acquired by World Racing Group (then Boundless Motorsports) in 2003.

The crown jewel event of the series, Super Dirt Week had to changed venues for the first time in 2016 to a dirt-covered Oswego Speedway in Oswego, New York following the demise & razing of the New York State Fairgrounds Racetrack.

== Cars ==
=== Specifications ===
- Engine: Max cubic inches 467
- Fuel system: Carburetor only 4 barrel Holley 950-1050 cfm
- Horsepower: range 650-800 hp
- Compression ratio: 13–14.5 :1
- RPM: 7000-8300
- Speed: Approximately 160 mph at the Syracuse Mile
- Powertrain: 2 speed trans 1 reverse plus quick change rear end.
- Lubrication system: Belt driven dry sump (app 13qts.)
- Fuel: VP Fuels racing gasoline only
- Wheelbase: 106”- 110”
- Thread width: 74” min. to 86” max.
- Weight: 2500 lbs. min. with driver
- Chassis: 1018, 1020 steel only
- Suspension: Mostly coil spring (coil over) or Torison Bar, rear. Coil spring (coil over), front.
- Ground clearance: App. 5” front 6” rear on frame heights.
- Minimum ground clearance: 2½”
- Tire brand: Hoosier Racing Tire
- Right rear tire: Circumference 92½”
- Wheels: Aluminum (bead lock)
- Steering system: Power steering (worm and sector)
- Brakes: 4 wheel hydraulic disc brakes (no power assist)

== Events ==
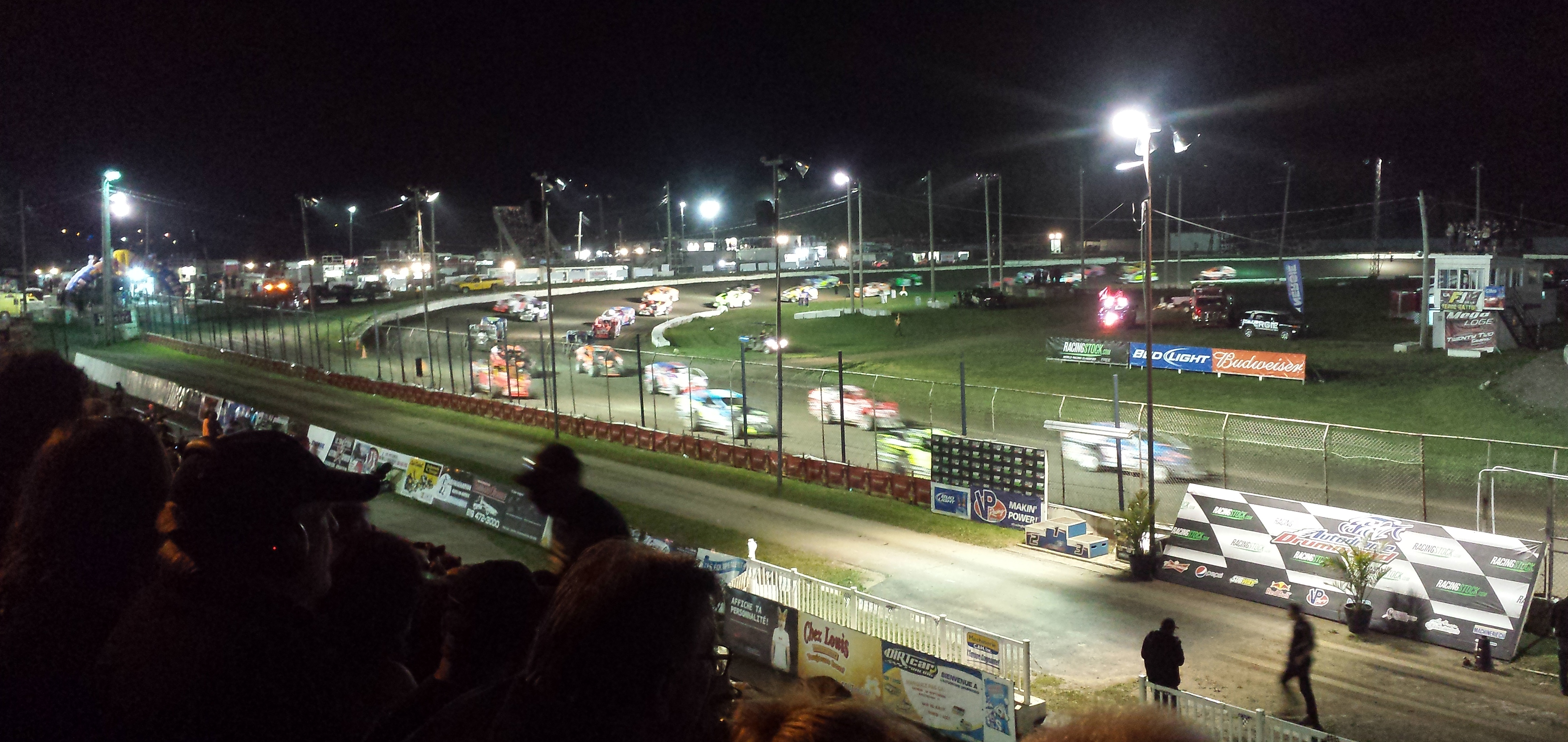

The premiere event for the series is the Billy Whittaker Cars & Trux 200, a part of NAPA Auto Parts Super DIRT Week which is currently held at the Oswego Speedway in Oswego, New York. The race features one of the biggest purses in dirt modified racing with the purse paying $50,000 to the winner. The race is currently broadcast by DIRTVision.com (live) & MavTV (delayed television). The race was originally held at the New York State Fairgrounds Mile in Syracuse until the track was razed in 2016. Previous broadcasters of Super DIRT Week include CBS Sports Network, Empire Sports Network, ESPN, SPEED & TNN.

Other major events currently on the Super DIRTcar Series schedule include DIRTcar Nationals at Volusia Speedway Park, Hall of Fame 100 at Weedsport Speedway, Mr. DIRT Track USA at Lebanon Valley Speedway and the World of Outlaws World Finals at Charlotte Motor Speedway.

== Champions ==
=== Mr. DIRTcar ===
Beginning with the 1976 season points earned in the Super DIRTcar Series were credited toward crowning an overall Mr. DIRT champion. Over the years, a variety of formulas have been used, and included bonus points for feature wins and/or seasonal standings at weekly home tracks. In 1998, the two titles were merged. Beginning in 2007 the Mr. DIRT series was rebranded to Mr. DIRTcar, and separate regional champions were also named. Since 2011 the overall title has been decided only on a driver's best 16 finishes at their weekly home track. In 2019 the contest garnered a title sponsor and was renamed the Hoosier Racing Tire Weekly Championship.

=== 358-Modified Mr. DIRTcar ===
In 1983, the Mr. Dirt 320 Modified Championship trail was created. These small block modifieds emerged from NASCAR's Sportsman division, which had been revamped in 1968. Many Northeast race tracks continued to run the old class, and the new Touring Series allowed these racers from the St. Lawrence Valley to compete against their counterparts in the Hudson Valley and Twin Tiers regions of Pennsylvania and New York.

In 1985 the 358 cubic inch engine was introduced to the class, and in 2006 DIRT MotorSports initiated a new "Regional Point System" for the 358-Modified, Sportsman and Pro Stock divisions. Each race run within a specified region was added into a driver's point standings for that region. A driver's top 12 finishes were then used to calculate the regional point standings and determine a regional Mr. DIRT champion. Later the Touring Series was split off, and the weekly home track competition replaced the regional points in determining the overall Mr. DIRTcar title. In 2016 and again in 2018 a regional points system was added to the 358 Modified Touring Series.

=== Champions by year ===
Year	Super DIRTcar Series	Big Block Modified Weekly Champion	DIRTcar 358 Modified Series	358 Modified Weekly Champion
2026	Alex Yankowski	Marc Johnson	Mat Williamson	Chris Rabbe
2025	Mat Williamson	Mat Williamson	Mat Williamson	Lance Willix II
2024	Mat Williamson	Peter Britten	Felix Roy	Lance Willix II
2023	Matt Sheppard	Marc Johnson	Mat Williamson	Lance Willix II
2022	Matt Sheppard	Larry Wight	Dave Marcuccilli	Mat Williamson
2021	Matt Sheppard	Matt Sheppard	Billy Dunn	Mat Williamson
2020	Stewart Friesen	Stewart Friesen	--	Mat Williamson
2019	Mat Williamson	Matt Sheppard	Erick Rudolph	Mat Williamson
		Mr. DIRTcar Champion		Mr. DIRTcar 358 Champion
2018	Matt Sheppard	Matt Sheppard	Larry Wight^{†}	Steve Bernier
2017	Matt Sheppard	Matt Sheppard	Steve Bernard	David Hébert
2016	Matt Sheppard	Matt Sheppard	Chris Raabe^{†}	David Hébert
2015	Matt Sheppard	Brett Hearn	Steve Bernard	David Hébert
2014	Billy Decker	Brett Hearn	Erick Rudolph	David Hébert
2013	Brett Hearn	Brett Hearn	Erick Rudolph	Erick Rudolph
2012	Matt Sheppard	Brett Hearn	Dale Planck	Dale Planck
2011	Matt Sheppard	Matt Sheppard	Danny Johnson	David Hébert
	Mr. DIRTcar Super Series Champion		Mr. DIRTcar 358 Series Champion	
2010	Matt Sheppard^{†}		Danny Johnson^{†}	
2009	Brett Hearn^{†}		Dale Planck^{†}	
2008	Billy Decker^{†}		Pete Bicknell^{†}	
2007	Brett Hearn^{†}		Mario Clair^{†}	
	Mr. DIRT Super Series Champion		Mr. DIRT 358 Series Champion	
2006	Alan Johnson		Brett Hearn^{†}	
2005	Tim Fuller		Alan Johnson	
2004	Gary Tomkins		Pat Ward^{†}	
2003	Alan Johnson		Tim Fuller	
2002	Alan Johnson		Steve Paine	
2001	Brett Hearn		Alan Johnson	
2000	Steve Paine		Danny Johnson	
1999	Danny Johnson		Danny Johnson/Steve Paine	
1998	Billy Decker		Alan Johnson	
	Super DIRT Series	Mr. DIRT Champion		
1997	Danny Johnson	Danny Johnson /Brett Hearn	Alan Johnson	
1996	Brett Hearn	Brett Hearn	Danny Johnson	
1995	Bob McCreadie	Bob McCreadie	Pat O'Brien	
1994	Bob McCreadie	Bob McCreadie	Pete Bicknell	
1993	Brett Hearn	Brett Hearn	Tim Fuller	
1992	Danny Johnson	Danny Johnson	Pat O'Brien	
1991	Doug Hoffman	Doug Hoffman	Pete Bicknell	
1990	Brett Hearn	Brett Hearn	Pat O'Brien	
1989	Danny Johnson	Danny Johnson	Laurent Ladouceur	
1988	Jack Johnson	Jack Johnson	Pat O'Brien	
1987	Jack Johnson	Jack Johnson	Curt Van Pelt	
1986	Charlie Rudolph	Charlie Rudolph	Doug Carlyle	
1985	Bob McCreadie	Jack Johnson	Lin Hough	
1984	Jack Johnson	Jack Johnson	Jeff Hoetzler	
1983	Alan Johnson	Alan Johnson	Tony Corcoran	
1982	Dave Lape	Jack Johnson		
1981	Alan Johnson	Alan Johnson		
1980	Jack Johnson	Jack Johnson		
1979	Jack Johnson	Will Cagle		
1978	No Points	Will Cagle		
1977	Will Cagle	Dave Lape		
1976	Will Cagle	Will Cagle		
1975	Will Cagle			
1974	Will Cagle			
1973	No points			
1972	No points			
^{†} Regional Awards / Year / Central / Eastern / Western / Northern / Southern; Mr. DIRTcar / 2010 / Matt Sheppard / Bobby Varin / Jeramiah Shingledecker; Mr. DIRTcar / 2009 / Matt Sheppard / Andy Bachetti / Kevin Bolland; Mr. DIRTcar / 2008 / Billy Decker / Brett Hearn / Brian Swartzlander; Mr. DIRTcar / 2007 / Jimmy Phelps / Brett Hearn / Brian Swatzlander; DIRTcar 358 Modified Series / 2018 / -- / -- / -- / Steve Bernier / Tim Sears Jr.; DIRTcar 358 Modified Series / 2016 / Chris Raabe / Claude Brouillard / Ryan Susice / --; Mr. DIRTcar 358 Series / 2010 / -- / -- / Pete Bicknell / Tim O'Brien; Mr. DIRTcar 358 Series / 2009 / -- / -- / Pete Bicknell / Danny O'Brien; Mr. DIRTcar 358 Series / 2008 / -- / Jerry Higbie / Pete Bicknell / Kayle Robidoux; Mr. DIRTcar 358 Series / 2007 / -- / David VanHorn / Pete Bicknell / Yan Bussiere; Mr. DIRTcar 358 Series / 2006 / -- / Brett Hearn / Pete Bicknell / Pat O'Brien; Mr. DIRTcar 358 Series / 2004 / -- / -- / -- / -- / Jeff Strunk

=== Records ===
- Most career wins: Brett Hearn (141)
- Most DIRTcar titles: Matt Sheppard (10)
- Most wins in a season: 10 (Brett Hearn 2002, Billy Decker 2008, Matt Sheppard 2016)
- Consecutive wins: 5 (Alan Johnson: 1983)
- Most seasons with at least 1 win: Brett Hearn (32)
- Consecutive seasons with at least one win: Brett Hearn (22)
- Different track wins: Danny Johnson (33)
- Youngest winner: Alex Yankowski (17 years old)
