= Weedsport Speedway =

Motorsport venue in Weedsport, New York

Coordinates: 43°3′34.17″N 76°32′48.36″W

- Location: Weedsport, New York
- Owner: Al Heinke
- Opened: 1955
- Former names: Cayuga County Fair Speedway
- Website: www.weedsportspeedway.com

Oval
- Surface: Clay
- Length: .6 km (0.37 mi)
- Turns: 4

Weedsport Speedway, formerly known as Cayuga County Fair Speedway, is a 3/8 mile oval dirt racetrack located on the Cayuga County Fairgrounds in Weedsport, New York.

== Auto racing ==
In the early 1950s Stanley Dudzinski carved a one-third mile oval into a berry patch to practice driving his race car. He and his wife Irene further developed the facility and in 1955 the gates were opened for the first competitive event. Glenn Donnelly (originally with Ken Ermiger) purchased the race track in 1970, increasing the clay oval to 3/8 mile, and creating the flagship for the Super DIRTcar Series.

In 2004, Donnelly sold the race track to the World Racing Group for $4.3 million. Since 2014, the speedway has been owned by Al Heinke, partner in Heinke Baldwin Racing, and previously a partner with Skip Barber at Lime Rock Park.

== Concerts ==
In the early-1980s the venue started hosting major concerts by some of the biggest bands in rock music, including Aerosmith, Santana, Stevie Nicks, The Beach Boys, Peter Frampton, Neil Young, Guns N' Roses, Kiss, Metallica, Bryan Adams, Ozzy Osbourne, Van Halen, Heart, Alice Cooper, Foreigner, Mötley Crüe, and Def Leppard, REO Speedwagon. For concerts the track has attracted crowds as large as 12,000.
