= John McArdell =

American Modified racing driver (1934-2021)

Johnny McArdell
- Born: John F. McArdell; October 28, 1934 Syracuse NY
- Died: May 10, 2021 (aged 86)

Modified racing career
- Years active: 1952-1977
- Car number: 11
- Championships: 7

Johnny McArdell (October 28, 1934 – May 10, 2021) was an American Modified racing driver. He was one of few drivers to make the successful transition from flatheads to V8 powered engines.

== Racing career ==
In 1952, McArdell and his brother Gale pooled their money to buy their first stock car, sharing driving duties at tracks like Lafayette and Brewerton Speedways. He soon became a regular winner at the Central New York venues including the "Salt City 25", a NASCAR sanctioned event for flatheads at the Syracuse Mile. McArdell claimed track titles at Maple Grove in Waterloo (1960), Canandaigua Speedway (1960, 1964) and Weedsport Speedway (1963, 1968). Still competitive in the twilight of his career, McArdell was track champion at both Rolling Wheels Raceway in Elbridge and Skyline Raceway in Cortland in 1975.

McArdell was inducted into the Northeast Dirt Modified Hall of Fame in 1995 and the New York State Stock Car Association Hall of Fame in 2019.
