= Dave Kneisel =

American racing driver (1927-1982)

- Born: Edward David Kneisel; August 21, 1927 Hackensack, New Jersey, U.S.
- Died: September 6, 1982 (aged 55)
- Debut season: 1950

Modified racing career
- Car number: 711
- Championships: 10
- Wins: 92
- Finished last season: 1982

E. David Kneisel (August 8, 1927 – September 6, 1982) was an American dirt modified race car driver. He was also a noted builder of race cars, founding Kneisel's Speed and Sport shop in Clarks Summit, Pennsylvania, which continued to field cars for multiple drivers after Kneisel's death.

== Racing career ==
Kneisel started his racing career in 1950 at the 1/5-mile asphalt Bone's Stadium near Pottstown Pennsylvania. He soon focused his efforts on dirt tracks, with victories in New York at Glen Aubry Raceway, Midstate Speedway in Morris, Rolling Wheels Raceway in Elbridge, and Skyline Raceway in Cortland; and in Pennsylvania at Hughesville Raceway, Nazareth Speedway, Penn-Can Speedway in Susquehanna, and Selinsgrove Speedway.

Kneisel was a six-time track champion at Five Mile Point Speedway, Kirkwood, New York, and also claimed track titles in New York at Brewerton Speedway, Canandaigua Speedway, Twin Valley Speedway in Chenango Forks, and Weedsport Speedway.

Kneisel was fatally injured in a racing accident at Orange County Fair Speedway in Middletown, New York. He was inducted into the Northeast Dirt Modified and the New York State Stock Car Association Halls of Fame.
