= Harold Bunting =

American Dirt Modified racing driver (born 1942)

- Born: Harold J. Bunting Jr. September 1942 (age 84)
- Retired: 1986
- Debut season: 1969

Modified racing career
- Car number: 17, 19,19D,30, 91
- Championships: 9
- Wins: 244+

Previous series
- 1960-1968: Kart racing

Championship titles
- 1977, 1980, 1985, 1986 Delaware State Fair Champion
- Statistics up to date as of July 20, 2025.

Harold Bunting (1942) is a retired American Dirt Modified racing driver from Milford, Delaware, credited with over 234 career wins at ten tracks in the Mid-Atlantic states.

== Racing career ==
Bunting was already an accomplished go-kart racer in 1969, when he transitioned to a modified stock car at Milford's Little Lincoln Speedway. Over the next 17 years, he claimed four track titles at Delaware's Georgetown Speedway and five at the U.S. 13 Speedway.

Bunting also competed successfully at Bridgeport Speedway in Delmar, New Jersey; in Pennsylvania at Grandview Speedway in Bechtelsville and Nazareth Speedway; and in Virginia at the A&N Speedway in Tasley. He was inducted into the Northeast Dirt Modified Hall of Fame in 2020.
