= Davey Moore (racing driver) =

Canadian Dirt Modified racing driver (born 1946)

- Born: David N. Moore; July 11, 1946 (age 80)
- Retired: 2015
- Debut season: 1970

Modified racing career
- Car number: 6
- Championships: 10
- Wins: 265+

Davey Moore (born July 11, 1946) is a Canadian retired Dirt Modified racing driver from St. Anns, Ontario. Nicknamed "the Canadian Blast", his victories included 12 features in a row in 1979.

== Racing career ==
Davey Moore skipped over the entry level divisions and began racing by purchasing a modified from top competitor Ivan Little in 1970. It was near the end of his third season before Moore claimed his first feature event win at Merrittville Speedway, Ontario, but he went on to win five track championships at the venue as well as five track titles at the Ransomville Speedway, New York.

Moore also has won at Humberstone Speedway in Port Colborne, Ontario, and in New York at Canandaigua Speedway, Five Mile Point Speedway in Kirkwood, Rolling Wheels Raceway in Elbridge, and Weedsport Speedway. Moore captured the 1981 Independence Day event at the Syracuse Mile, New York.

Davey Moore was inducted into the St. Catharines Sports Hall of Fame in 1997 and the Northeast Dirt Modified Hall of Fame in 2003.
