= Lin Hough =

American Dirt Modified racing driver (1957

- Born: Linwood L Hough; October 28, 1957 (age 69) Bath, New York
- Debut season: 1977

Modified racing career
- Car number: 117
- Championships: 7
- Finished last season: 1994

Championship titles
- 1985 Mr. Dirt 358 Modified Champion

Linwood "Lin" Hough (born November 25, 1957) is a retired driver and promoter of Dirt Modified stock car racing. He was recognized for his driving talent and respected for his innovations in advancing the sport.

== Racing career ==
Hough began his racing career in 1977 in the Sportsman division, and claimed the class championship at Woodhull Raceway, New York in 1982. The next year he began his career in the Modified ranks, competing primarily in the Finger Lakes region of New York, including Rolling Wheels Raceway in Elbridge and the Syracuse Mile. He captured four track titles at Dundee Speedway, and totaled three at Woodhull. Hough also made appearances at Cayuga Speedway, Ontario; Sanair Super Speedway in Saint-Pie, Quebec; and Thompson Speedway, Connecticut.

After retiring from the driver's seat in 1995, Hough and his wife Cindy purchased Dundee Speedway, renamed it Black Rock Speedway, started a truck division, a youth division, and began fostering the careers of female drivers. They were recognized for their efforts by being named one of America's top ten short tracks by Dick Berggren's Speedway Illustrated Magazine.

Hough was inducted into the Northeast Dirt Modified Hall of Fame in 2010.
