= Lloyd Holt =

Canadian racing driver (1937–2022)

- Born: Lloyd G. Holt; December 31, 1937 Nova Scotia Canada
- Died: June 4, 2022 (aged 84)
- Retired: 1980
- Debut season: 1957

Modified racing career
- Car number: 15
- Championships: 3
- Wins: 82

Lloyd Holt (December 31, 1937 – June 4, 2022) was a pioneering driver of dirt modified stock cars on the Niagara Frontier. In 1970, he became the inaugural track champion at the Rolling Wheels Raceway in Elbridge, New York.

== Racing career ==
Holt got his start in 1957, when he entered a stock Hudson with a big six-cylinder engine in the jalopy class at Merrittville Speedway in Ontario. He soon moved up to the modified class where he also competed and was victorious in New York at Five Mile Point Speedway in Kirkwood, Ransomville Speedway, Skyline Raceway in Virgil, and Weedsport Speedway, as well as Speedway Park in Stony Brook, Ontario.

Holt claimed the 1967 track title at Humberstone Speedway in Port Colborne, Ontario, as well as the 1969 track championship at the Maple Grove Speedway in Waterloo, New York. He was inducted into Merrittville Wall of Fame in 2013 and into the Northeast Dirt Modified Hall of Fame 2014.
