= Northeast Dirt Modified Hall of Fame =

Hall of Fame in Weedsport, New York

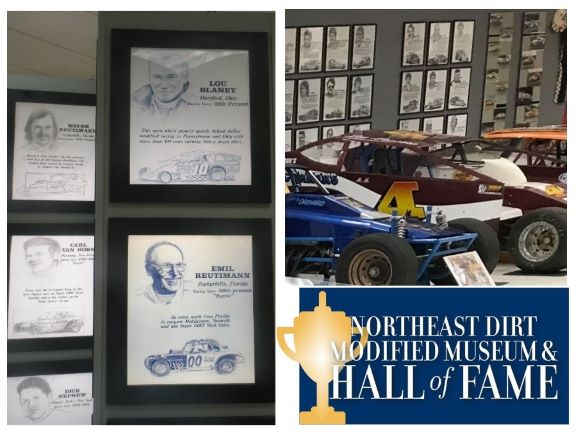
- Museum Exhibits

- Location within New York Location within the United States
- Established: April 12, 1992
- Location: 1 Speedway Dr; Weedsport, New York, USA
- Coordinates: 43°3′N 76°34′W
- Type: Modified Stock Car Racing (Dirt Surface)
- Website: Official website

The Northeast Dirt Modified Hall of Fame was established in 1992 to recognize individual achievements in the sport of stock car racing. It is located at 1 Speedway Dr., Weedsport, New York.

== History ==
The inaugural induction ceremony was held on April 12, 1992, with 12 drivers and one pioneer driver being selected. The initial selection committee was composed of Gary Chadwick, Andy Fusco, Gary Rowe, Tom Skibinski, and Gary Spaid; all members of the motorsports media. The ceremony was followed by a Hall of Fame race at Weedsport Speedway.

In 1993, the first non-driver racing award was added. The award was named after Area Auto Racing News founder Leonard J. Sammons Jr., and was established to recognize outstanding contributions to the sport. In subsequent years, awards honoring both car owners and mechanics/engineering were also presented. In 2002, Gater Racing News announced the addition of an annual Outstanding Woman in Racing Award. And upon Andy Fusco's untimely death in 2015, the Award for Media Excellence was established in his memory. Periodically, the Jack Burgess Memorial Award is bestowed on an announcer who has made a lasting impact on the sport.

== Inductees ==
=== 1992 to 1999 ===
1992	André, Frank; Cagle, Will; Chamberlain, Gerald; Corey, Pete; Hoag, Dutch; Kotary, Cliff; Olsen, Budd; Rafter, Billy; Schneider, Frankie; Tasnady, Al; Tobias, Dick; Wimble, Bill; (P) Musclow, Elmer
1993	Allan, Willie; Carter, Rags; Gerhart, Bobby; Kneisel, Dave; Lazzaro, Lou; Robinson, Guy; Shoemaker, Kenny; (P) Garrison, Doug
1994	Malzahn, Bobby; Reakes, Sammy; Treichler, Merv; (P) Danish, Steve
1995	Gahan, Ernie; McArdell, John; McLaughlin, Jackie; (P) Holliday, Buck
1996	Charland, Rene; Little, Ivan; Ploski, Stan; (P) Hough, Pappy
1997	Meahl, Kenny; Reutimann, Buzzie; (P) Westervelt, Howie
1998	Akulis, Chuck; Corellis, Tommy; (P) Hurtubise, Jim
1999	Beavers, Sammy; Ortiz, Ed; (P) Herbert, Jeep
=== 2000 to 2009 ===
2000	Blaney, Lou; Bottcher, Bobby; (P) Murphy, Jack
2001	Coville, C.D.; LaFrance, Marcel; (P) Harwi, Otto
2002	Gatien, Bob; (P) Zeigler, Bob
2003	Hulbert, Mert; Moore, Davey; Peek, Harry
2004	Carlyle, Doug; Lape, Dave; Shampine, Jim
2005	Jelley, Butch; Nagel, Carl; (P) Cain, Bobby
2006	Brightbill, Kenny; McCreadie, Bob; (P) Reiners, Glenn
2007	Heaslip, Dave; Osmun, Billy; (P) May, Dick
2008	Reutimann, Wayne; VanHorn, Carl; (P) Nephew, Dick
2009	Brenn, Ken Jr.; Plazek, Joe; (P) Klapak, Mike
=== 2010 to 2019 ===
2010	Hough, Lin; Quarterson, Ralph; Reddick, Gary
2011	Cook, Jerry; Hoffman, Doug; (P) Taylor, Irv
2012	Bicknell, Pete; Johnson, Jack; (P) Doiron, Ovide
2013	Cozze, Frank; McLaughlin, Mike; (P) Watt, Blackie
2014	Colsten, Mike; Rudolph, Charlie; (P) Holt, Lloyd
2015	Balough, Gary; Wetmore, Donnie; (P) Delaney, Jim
2016	Heotzler, Jeff; Pauch, Billy; (P) Diffendorf, Don
2017	Johnson, Alan; Paine, Steve; (P) Adam, Freddy
2018	Swartzlander, Brian; Tremont, Kenny Jr.; (P) Rossell, Bob
2019	Johnson, Danny; O’Brien, Pat Jr.; (P) Brown, Ray
=== 2020 to present ===
2020; 2021	Bunting, Harold; Hearn, Brett; Ward, Pat; (P) Donahue, Joe
2022	Decker, Billy; Von Dohren, Craig; (P) June, Don
2023	Fuller, Tim; O'Brien, Danny; (P) Cameron, Bob
2024	Horton, Jimmy; Tomkins, Gary
2025	Howard, Duane; Planck, Dale; Van Pelt, Billy
2026	Gibbs, Mitch; McCreadie, Tim; Wilkins, Bobby

P= Pioneer Selection

== Awards ==
=== 1993 to 2001 ===: / Leonard J. Sammons Jr. Award for Outstanding Contribution to Auto Racing / Gene DeWitt Car Owner Award / Mechanic/ Engineering Award; 1993 / Stevens, Ray; 1994 / Donnelly, Glenn; Fried, Irv; Gerber, Al; 1995 / Hunter, Bob; Lane, Ace Sr. / Bruss, Gil; Turrner, Don & Ray; 1996 / Heath, Irv & Anna; Northern Stock Car Club / Deasey, Paul; 1997 / Patrick, Norm; Wright, Dave / Hollebrand, Pete; 1998 / Berggren, Dick / Higbie, Gary & Jerry; 1999 / Deuel, Les / Bullock, Joe / Jeffery, Scott; 2000 / Veach, Jack / Legue, Sheldon / Tremont, Ken Sr.; 2001 / Hill, John; O'Brien, Dick / Ferraiuolo, Tony / Tones, Bill
=== 2002 to 2014 ===: / Leonard J. Sammons Jr. Award for Outstanding Contribution to Auto Racing / Gene DeWitt Car Owner Award / Mechanic/ Engineering Award / Outstanding Women in Racing; 2002 / Feuz, Ed / Cope, Harold / Paine, Don / Beberwyk, Hertha; Farney, Gert; Lynch, Jean; 2003 / Friesen Family / Sincerbeaux, Jim / Kisacky, Randy / Singer, Patricia; Taney, Mary; 2004 / Dudzinski, Stanley / Elaine James Motorsports / Grecco, Tommy / Reilley, Terry; Salvas, Rachel; Veach,Bonnie; 2005 / Nuber, Larry / Faust, Bob & Michele / DeSarbo, JoJo / Hacker, Jane; Thurston, Rose; 2006 / Fink, Joan & Harvey / Pitkavish, Joe / Dornberger, Sonny / Anderson, Barb; Bicknell, Nancy; Jennejohn, Kim; 2007 / Freshman, Aaron; Morin, Ron / Rudalavage, Jeff / Burdick, Mike / Lutz, Annette; Martin, Helen; 2008 / Burgess, Jack; Marotta, Joe / Myers, Carl / Langenstein, Charlie / Reakes, Zelda; Toal, Marilyn; 2009 / Saxton, Ernie / Wight, John & Laura / Cozze Crew / Scarpati, Gloria Katona; Sutherland, Serenity; Zemken, Jessica; 2010 / Mulligan, Brian / Brownell, Jeff / Phillips, Andrew / Robinson, Tana; Snyderman, Judy; Swanson, Buffy; 2011 / Ladabouche, Bill / Cozze, Dick / Ste. Marie, Ron / Haynes, Carol Demling; Payne, Audrey; 2012 / Speno, Jack / Palmer, Alton & Carole / Colton, Billy / Flanagan, Carol Morin; Kirkland, Cheryl; Tobias, Dianne; 2013 / Petrocci Family / Smith, George Sr. / Johnson, Milt & Fleischman, Bruce / Doust, Jayne; Kennedy, Wendy; Wetmore, Marcia; 2014 / Commander, Howie / Barcomb, Cliff / Hearn, Bobby / Bicknell-Jones, Erica; Yasinsac-Gillespie, Robin
=== 2015 to present ===
	Leonard J. Sammons Jr. Award for Outstanding Contribution to Auto Racing	Gene DeWitt Car Owner Award	Mechanic/ Engineering Award	Outstanding Women in Racing	Andrew S.Fusco Award for Media Excellence	Jack Burgess Memorial Award
2015	Heinke, Al	Brenn, Ken	Hillman, Mike	Clark, Barb	Boyd, Lew	
2016	Beberwyk, Marty	Mills, Eugene	Dini, Bob	Rogers, Theresa	Caruso, George Jr.	
2017	Salvas, Gaston	Ross, Randy	Tobias, Rich Jr.	Emig, Vicki	Sammons, Lenny H.	
2018	Spaid, Gary	Bramall, Ray	Troyer, Maynard	Cosco, Linda	Davies, Don & Jo Ann	
2019	Fried, Jerry	Jordan, Lester (Lucky)	Conkey, Howard	Chadwick, JoAnne	Thomas, Mel	Ruffner, Warren
2020; 2021	Miller, Bob and Donna	Conley, Tico	Taylor, Billy	Preston-Elms, April	Rumsey, Tery	
2022	Richards, C.J.	Madsen, Guy	Mack, Eric	Lazzaro, Melissa "Mimi"	Lane, John "Ace" Jr.	
2023	Kuhl, Paul	Hyneman, Glenn	Williamson, Randy	Fallis, Laurie	Donnelly, Patrick	
2024	DeVore, Lyle	Spraker, Jake	Hoffman, Davey	Pauch Mahaney, Mandee	Logan, Doug	Sova, Roy
2025	Cathell, Charlie and Joyce	Salerno, Vinny	Conroy, Tommy	Cella, Jane	Voorhees, Fred	
2026	Perrotte, Mike	Larson, Chris	Sine, John	Morhman, Terri	Hedger, Ron	

== Museum ==
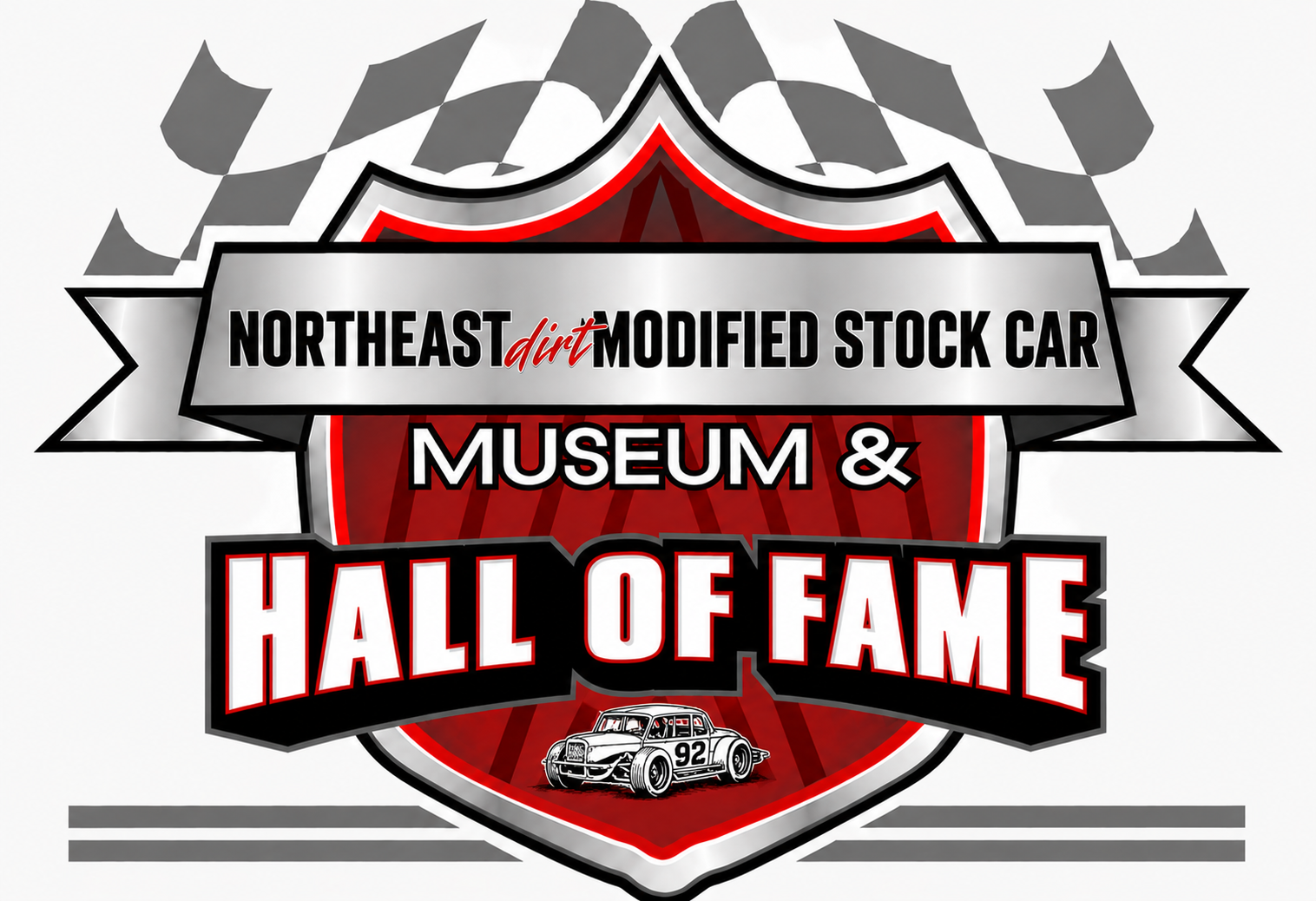

The Dirt Modified Stock Car Museum is chartered by the Board of Regents of the State of New York Department of Education as a 501(c) 3 not-for-profit institution. In addition to the Hall of Fame, the museum exhibits historic race cars, classic autos, unique racing memorabilia and rarely seen photographs.

The permanent display includes 'The X car', a 1950s era flathead stock car driven by Frank André to many victories in Northern New York and Southern Canada. Although occasionally on loan, the museum is also the permanent home of the controversial black #112 Lincoln Town Car Mark X/1 "Batmobile" driven by Gary Balough to the 1980 Schaefer 200.

The museum features a historic memorial to honor individuals who have died as the result of racing. The end of the Museum trail features a "Jack Burgess Memorial Video Room" and a gift shop.
