= Sammy Reakes =

American Modified racing driver (1930-2000)

- Born: Samuel H.Reakes; November 6, 1930 Nanticoke, Pennsylvania, U.S.
- Died: March 25, 2000 (aged 69)

Motorsport career
- Debut season: 1952
- Championships: 11
- Wins: 400+

Championship titles
- 1974 NASCAR Illinois Late Model Sportsman Champion

Samuel Reakes (November 16, 1930 – March 5, 2000) was an American Modified racing driver. Equally adept on both dirt and asphalt surfaces, officials have estimated that he captured over 400 feature wins in a career that spanned three decades.

== Racing career ==
Reakes was introduced to racing by his cousin Ed Spencer, father of NASCAR Cup Series standout Jimmy Spencer, at Bowman's Creek Speedway, Pennsylvania. In 1953 Reakes relocated to Central New York and became a regular at Fulton Speedway, LaFayette Speedway, and Rolling Wheels Raceway (Elbridge). He captured track championships at Brewerton Speedway, Canandaigua Speedway, Maple Grove Speedway (Waterloo), Monroe County Fairgrounds, Orange County Fair Speedway, and Weedsport Speedway.

A job transfer required relocating to northern Illinois, where Reakes won the Late Model Sportsman championship at Rockville Speedway in 1973, and captured the state championship a year later.

Reakes was inducted into the Northeast Dirt Modified Hall of Fame in 1994, and his wife Zelda received the Hall's 2008 Outstanding Women in Auto Racing award for her behind the scenes support.
