= Bobby Wilkins (racing driver) =

American racing driver (1956–2024)

- Nationality: American
- Born: Robert Warren Wilkins; July 21, 1956 Milford, Delaware, U.S.
- Died: October 18, 2024 (aged 68)
- Retired: 2001
- Debut season: 1971

Modified racing career
- Years active: 1978-2001
- Car number: 3, 11, 18, 19D, 22, 30, 69, 94
- Championships: 10
- Wins: 156

Previous series
- 1982-1985 1975-1985 1971-1974: Sprint car racing Late models Kart racing

Championship titles
- Delaware State Fair Champion (4 times)

Robert W. Wilkens (July 21, 1956 – October 18, 2024) was an American racecar driver who competed in dirt modifieds, late models and sprint cars.

== Racing career ==
Wilkins began racing go-karts, and by age 15, was campaigning a 6-cylinder sportsman at Little Lincoln and then Georgetown Speedways. One of the few drivers to win in a modified, late model, and sprint car, he won nine track championships in his home state between Georgetown and Delaware International Speedways, as well as one at the Bridgeport Speedway, New Jersey.

Wilkins was also an accomplished fabricator, constructing many of his own race cars, and later working with the Hall of Fame Racing NASCAR Cup Series team.

In 2026, Wilkins was inducted into the Northeast Dirt Modified Hall of Fame.
