= Billy Van Pelt =

- Born: William Van Pelt; August 26, 1966 (age 60) Westfield, Pennsylvania, U.S.
- Retired: 2022
- Debut season: 1988

Modified racing career
- Car number: 2
- Championships: 26
- Wins: 243

Championship titles
- T3 All Star 358-Modified Series (4)

"Billy Van Pelt". Auto Racing Research Associates.

William Van Pelt (born August 26, 1966) is an American retired Dirt Modified racing driver credited with 243 career wins at 9 tracks in the Twin Tiers regions of Pennsylvania and New York.

== Racing career ==
Billy Van Pelt first got behind the wheel of a modified formerly driven by his brother in 1987. By 1989, Stock Car Racing Magazine billed him as an “up and coming rising star.”

Van Pelt competed at 40 different racetracks during his career, including All-Tech Raceway in Lake City, Florida; Canandaigua Speedway, Ransomville Speedway, Rolling Wheels Raceway (Elbridge) and the Syracuse Mile in New York; and Clinton County Speedway (Mill Hall), Hill Speedway (Monroe), Lernerville Speedway (Sarver), Selinsgrove Speedway and Tri-City Speedway (Oakland) in Pennsylvania.

Van Pelt was a standout at the Woodhull Raceway in New York, claiming 23 track titles. He also won two championships at Outlaw Speedway in Dundee, New York, another at Freedom Motorsports Park in Delevan, New York, and captured four T3 All-Star Series touring championships from 2005 to 2009. Billy Van Pelt was inducted into the Northeast Dirt Modified Hall of Fame in 2025, along with joining the 2025 class of the New York State Stock Car Association Hall of Fame.

== Personal life ==
Billy Van Pelt is part of a racing family. Patriarch Jim drove for many years before campaigning a car for sons Curt and Tony, as well as Billy. Cousin Jason Burdett progressed from crewing for the Van Pelts to serving as NASCAR Hall of Famer Jimmie Johnson's crew chief in the Daytona 500, while nephew Dillon Groover began winning races at age 14.
