= Gary Tomkins =

American Dirt Modified racing driver (born 1966)

- Born: Gary A. Tomkins; March 4, 1966 (age 60)

Modified racing career
- Debut season: 1988
- Car number: 84
- Championships: 4
- Wins: 120

Previous series
- 1982-1984 Wins: Street stocks 26

Championship titles
- 2004 Mr. Dirt Super Series Champion
- Statistics up to date as of February 3, 2024.

Gary Tomkins (born March 4, 1966) is an American dirt modified racing driver. Tomkins has 146 feature event wins in the U.S., Canada and Australia.

== Racing career ==
Tomkins gutted a Dodge Challenger at the age of 15 and entered it in the Street Stock class at the Canandaigua Speedway, New York, winning 26 times over the following two years. Tomkins then spent the next few years attending college and working for chassis builder Maynard Troyer, while piecing together a Sportsman car, which he raced to Canandaigua's division title in 1989. Gaining some attention as Danny Johnon's relief driver for one race in 1990, Tomkins was next invited to race full time by car owner Darrell Simmons, and scored his first Modified victory in 1992.

Tomkins claimed the 2004 track championship at Brewerton Speedway, New York, and the 2004 and 2005 modified crowns at Rolling Wheels Raceway in Elbridge, New York.. He was victorious at 14 different tracks including Can-Am Speedway (LaFargeville), Utica-Rome Speedway (Vernon) and Weedsport Speedway in New York; Cornwall Motor Speedway in Ontario, Canada; Hagerstown Speedway, Maryland; and Lismore Speedway in New South Wales, Australia.

Tomkins was inducted into the Northeast Dirt Modified Hall of Fame in 2024.
