= Billy Osmun =

American Dirt Modified racing driver (born 1943)

- Born: December 6, 1943 (age 82) Asbury, New Jersey, U.S.
- Retired: 1993

Modified racing career
- Debut season: 1965
- Car number: 3,73,81,99
- Championships: 1
- Wins: 92

Previous series
- 1962-1966: Drag racing

Championship titles
- 1978 National Dirt Track Champion; 1978, 1979, 1980 New York State Fair Champion

Billy Osmun (born December 6, 1943) is a retired American Dirt Modified racing driver. He focused his career on the Mid-Atlantic states, and won 59 feature events just in New Jersey.

== Racing career ==
From the Asbury section of Franklin Township, Warren County, New Jersey, Osmun began racing Gassers and Altereds on the drag strip before selling his equipment and purchasing a stock car. He entered his first Modified race at Flemington Speedway in New Jersey in late 1965 and promptly hit the first turn fence, flipping three times. It was not until 1969 at East Windsor Speedway, New Jersey, that he scored his first Modified victory with this original car. Soon thereafter, Osmun purchased a former Bob Rossell car and began more frequent visits to Victory Lane.

Despite Osmun's success at New Jersey and Pennsylvania racing venues, it was in 1978 in New York at Orange County Fair Speedway that Osmun earned his only track title. A resident of Bridgewater Township, New Jersey, he was particularly successful at the Syracuse Mile, winning the Super Dirt Week main event in 1974, and in 1978 taking the first of three consecutive New York State Fair championship events at the track.

Osmun was inducted into the Eastern Motorsports Press Association Hall of Fame and the Northeast Dirt Modified Hall of Fame.
