= Mike Colsten =

American Dirt Modified racing driver (born 1949)

- Born: Michael Francis Colsten, Sr. January 18, 1949 Binghamton, New York
- Died: January 3, 2020 (aged 70)
- Retired: 2018
- Debut season: 1969

Modified racing
- Years active: 1976-2018
- Car number: 51
- Championships: 5
- Wins: 150+

Previous series
- 1969-1975 Championships: Late model 9

Michael Colsten (January 18, 1949 – January 3, 2020) was an American dirt modified racing driver, credited with over 150 career feature event wins, driving a Ford powered stock car in a sport dominated by Chevrolets.

== Racing career ==
Colsten began his racing career in 1969 in the Late Model division, winning class titles in New York at Rolling Wheels Raceway in Elbridge, Weedsport Speedway, and Twin Valley Speedway in Chenango, and in Pennsylvania at Herb Harvey Speedway in Lemon. He moved up into the Modified ranks in 1976, winning his first feature event the following year at Weedsport, and ultimately claiming the track championships in 1988, 1990, 1991, 2013 and 2014 at the Five Mile Point Speedway in Kirkwood, New York.

Colsten was inducted into the New York State Stock Car Association Hall of Fame in 2013, and the Northeast Dirt Modified Hall of Fame in 2014.

== Personal life ==
In 2012, Colsten was diagnosed with mesothelioma. During surgeries, treatment and recovery, he continued to compete and claimed two of his five track championships at Five Mile Point Speedway.

Colsten's son, Joey, began competing with and against his father in 2003, and has continued the racing tradition.
