= Curt Van Pelt =

American Dirt Modified racing driver (born 1957)

- Born: James Curtis Van Pelt II; December 31, 1957 (age 68) Westfield, Pennsylvania, U.S.
- Retired: 2018
- Debut season: 1977

Modified racing career
- Years active: 1982-2018
- Car number: 11jr ,12T
- Championships: 4
- Wins: 90+

Previous series
- 1977-1981 Championships: Late models 4

Championship titles
- 1987 Mr. Dirt 358 Modified Champion

Curt Van Pelt (born December 31, 1957) is an American retired Dirt Modified racing driver credited with 135 career wins throughout the northeastern United States and southeastern Canada.

== Racing career ==
Curt Van Pelt started in the Late Models at New York's Woodhull Raceway in 1977 and was soon winning races and track titles by the handful. By 1982, he and his car owner, father Jim Van Pelt, decided to advance to the modifieds, immediately winning the division championship at the Circle K Speedway in Whitesville, New York.

In 1987 Van Pelt was hired to drive the Sherwood #11JR, winning the Woodhull track championship and the regional 358 modified MR. DIRT title. He went on to drive for several car owners, eventually claiming eight track titles, including one at Dundee Speedway in New York and a second modified championship at Woodhull.

Van Pelt also worked as race director at McKean County Raceway in Smethport, Pennsylvania. He was inducted into the New York State Stock Car Association Hall of Fame with the class of 2018.

== Personal life ==
Curt Van Pelt is part of a racing family. Patriarch Jim drove for many years before campaigning a car for sons Billy and Tony, as well as Curt. Cousin Jason Burdett progressed from crewing for the Van Pelts to serving as NASCAR Hall of Famer Jimmie Johnson's crew chief in the Daytona 500, while nephew Dillon Groover began winning races at age 14.
