= Joe Donahue (racing driver) =

American racing driver (born 1926)

- Born: Joseph E. Donahue; August 25, 1926 Binghamton, New York
- Died: April 30, 2007 (aged 80)

Modified racing career
- Debut season: 1948
- Championships: 11
- Finished last season: 1971

Joseph Donahue (August 25, 1926 – April 30, 2007) was a pioneering driver of Dirt Modified stock cars. In 1957, Donahue won every race but one at Glen Aubrey Raceway, New York, and the track championship.

== Racing career ==
Following his service in World War II, Donahue started out racing stock cars, winning his first feature in 1949 at the Drive-in Speedway in Doty Hill, Pennsylvania. He also competed successfully in Pennsylvania at Langhorne Speedway and VFW Raceway at the Bradford County Fairgrounds, and at Shangri-La Speedway in Owego, New York.

Over his career, Donahue won four track championships at Five Mile Point Speedway in Kirkwood, New York, a second title at Glen Aubrey, two at Susquehanna Speedway, Pennsylvania, and a single title at Mid-State Speedway in Morris, New York. Joe Donahue was inducted into the Northeast Dirt Modified Hall of Fame 2020.
