= Dave Heaslip =

Canadian Dirt Modified racing driver (born 1944)

- Born: David Heaslip; 1944 (age 81–82) Gananoque, Ontario, Canada
- Debut season: 1960

Modified racing career
- Car number: 84
- Championships: 10
- Wins: 300+

David Heaslip is a retired Canadian dirt modified racing driver. Credited with more than 300 career wins he competed for 50 years against the toughest competition on both the Canadian and American sides of the St. Lawrence River.

== Racing career ==
Dave Heaslip got his start in motorsports in 1954 when as a 9-year-old he accompanied his father Ken Heaslip to the Edgewood Speedway in Alexandria Bay, New York. The elder Heaslip fielded a car numbered "GO" for his hometown, Gananoque, Ontario. By age 15, Dave was piloting an old Pontiac coupe with the family number at the Kingston Speedway (Ontario). He won his first feature event soon afterwards and added the Watertown Speedway on the New York side of the border as a regular stop.

Heaslip competed successfully at the race venues of southeastern Canada, including Brockville Speedway and Capital City Speedway in Ontario, and in New York at such tracks as the Lebanon Valley Speedway and Outlaw Speedway. Heaslip won three track championships at each Autodrome Edelweiss (Quebec), Cornwall Motor Speedway (Ontario), and Frogtown International Speedway (Hogansburg, New York) and one at Can-Am Speedway in LaFargeville, New York. In 2003, he competed in a BriSCA F-1 for the BriSCA World Finals at Coventry Speedway, England.

Heaslip was inducted into the Northeast Dirt Modified Hall of Fame in 2007.
