= Asbury, New Jersey =

Populated place in Warren County, New Jersey, US

- Census-designated place
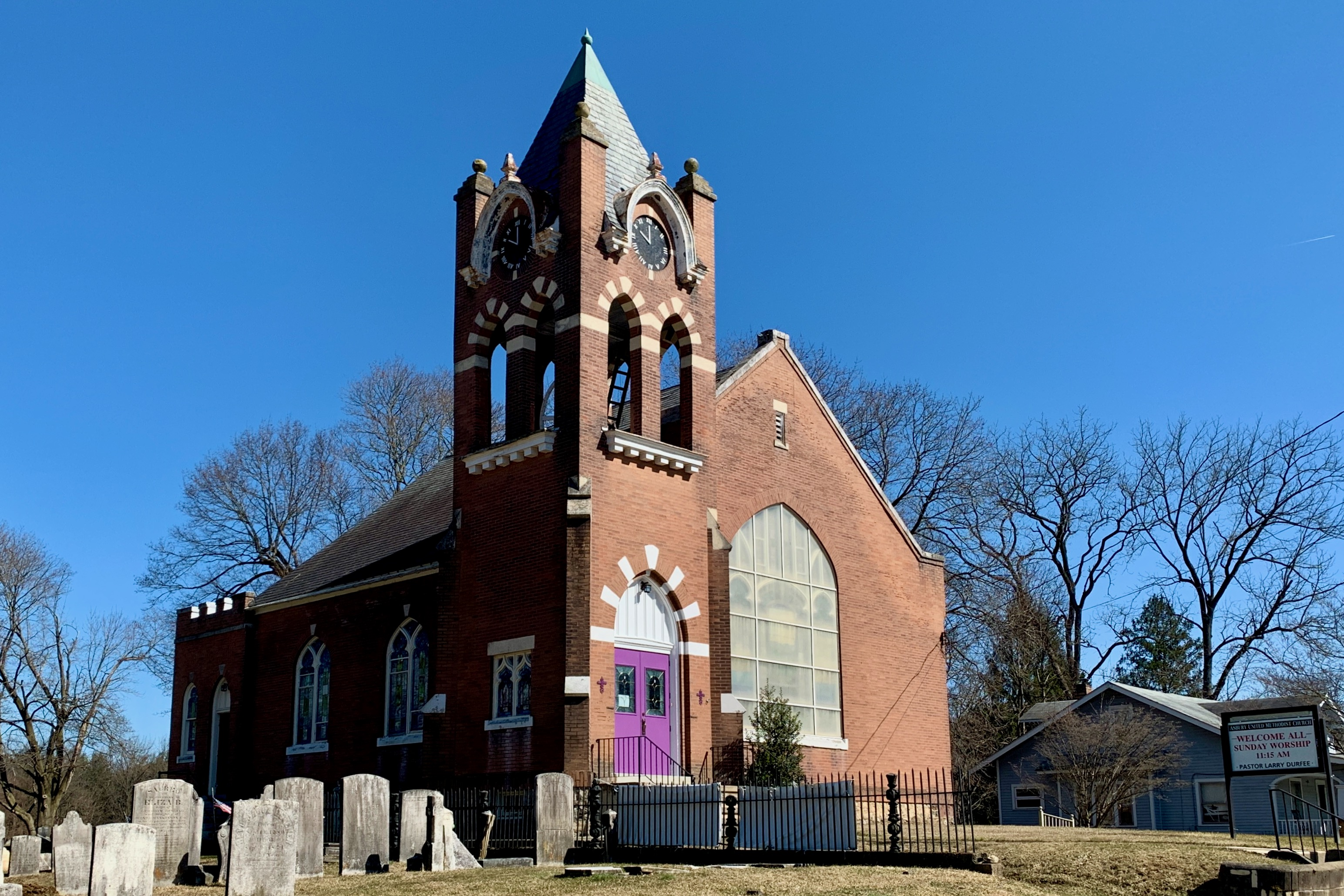
- Asbury United Methodist Church

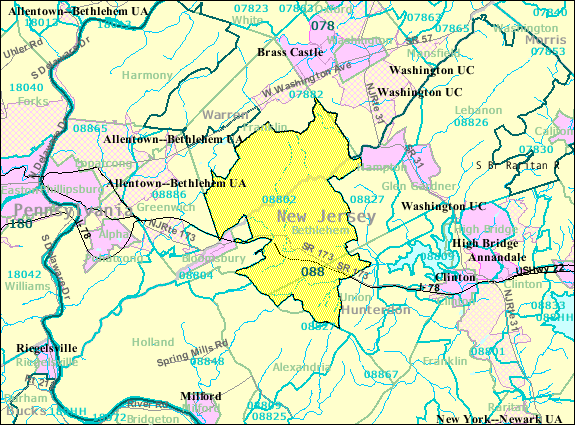
- United States Census Bureau Census 2000 map of ZCTA 08802 Asbury, New Jersey

- Location in Warren County Location in New Jersey Location in the United States
- Coordinates: 40°41′45″N 75°00′37″W
- Country: United States
- State: New Jersey
- County: Warren
- Township: Franklin
- Named for: Francis Asbury

Area
  - Total: 0.70 sq mi (1.82 km^{2})
  - Land: 0.69 sq mi (1.80 km^{2})
  - Water: 0.012 sq mi (0.03 km^{2}) 0.85%
- Elevation: 338 ft (103 m)

Population (2020)
  - Total: 270
  - Density: 390/sq mi (150.4/km^{2})
- Time zone: UTC−05:00 (Eastern (EST))
  - Summer (DST): UTC−04:00 (EDT)
- ZIP Code: 08802
- Area code: 908
- FIPS code: 34-01900
- GNIS feature ID: 874391; 2583966

Asbury is an unincorporated community and census-designated place (CDP) located within Franklin Township in Warren County, in the U.S. state of New Jersey, that was created as part of the 2010 United States census. As of the 2020 census, Asbury had a population of 270.

== History ==
The community was named for Francis Asbury, the first American bishop of the Methodist Episcopal Church in the United States.

The Asbury Historic District encompassing the community was added to the National Register of Historic Places on March 19, 1993, for its significance in architecture, industry, religion, community development, politics/government, and commerce.

== Geography ==
According to the United States Census Bureau, Asbury had a total area of 0.700 square miles (1.813 km^{2}), including 0.694 square miles (1.798 km^{2}) of land and 0.006 square miles (0.015 km^{2}) of water (0.85%).

== Demographics ==
Historical population
Census	Pop.	Note	%±
2010	273		—
2020	270		−1.1%
U.S. Decennial Census

Asbury first appeared as a census designated place in the 2010 U.S. census.

=== 2020 census ===
Asbury CDP, New Jersey – Racial and ethnic composition Note: the US Census treats Hispanic/Latino as an ethnic category. This table excludes Latinos from the racial categories and assigns them to a separate category. Hispanics/Latinos may be of any race.
Race / Ethnicity (NH = Non-Hispanic)	Pop 2010	Pop 2020	% 2010	% 2020
White alone (NH)	270	259	98.90%	95.93%
Black or African American alone (NH)	0	0	0.00%	0.00%
Native American or Alaska Native alone (NH)	0	0	0.00%	0.00%
Asian alone (NH)	1	3	0.37%	1.11%
Native Hawaiian or Pacific Islander alone (NH)	0	0	0.00%	0.00%
Other race alone (NH)	0	0	0.00%	0.00%
Mixed race or Multiracial (NH)	0	0	0.00%	0.00%
Hispanic or Latino (any race)	2	8	0.73%	2.96%
Total	273	270	100.00%	100.00%

=== 2010 census ===
The 2010 United States census counted 273 people, 105 households, and 79 families in the CDP. The population density was 393.3 per square mile (151.9/km^{2}). There were 108 housing units at an average density of 155.6 per square mile (60.1/km^{2}). The racial makeup was 99.27% (271) White, 0.00% (0) Black or African American, 0.00% (0) Native American, 0.37% (1) Asian, 0.00% (0) Pacific Islander, 0.37% (1) from other races, and 0.00% (0) from two or more races. Hispanic or Latino of any race were 0.73% (2) of the population.

Of the 105 households, 31.4% had children under the age of 18; 59.0% were married couples living together; 9.5% had a female householder with no husband present and 24.8% were non-families. Of all households, 21.0% were made up of individuals and 7.6% had someone living alone who was 65 years of age or older. The average household size was 2.60 and the average family size was 2.99.

23.8% of the population were under the age of 18, 6.6% from 18 to 24, 22.3% from 25 to 44, 37.7% from 45 to 64, and 9.5% who were 65 years of age or older. The median age was 43.4 years. For every 100 females, the population had 99.3 males. For every 100 females ages 18 and older there were 100.0 males.

=== 2000 census ===
As of the 2000 United States census, the population for ZIP Code Tabulation Area 08802 was 3,933.

== Transportation ==
County Route 632 (Asbury Anderson Road) runs east–west through the community and intersects with County Route 643 (Old Main Street), which runs north–south.

== Points of interest ==
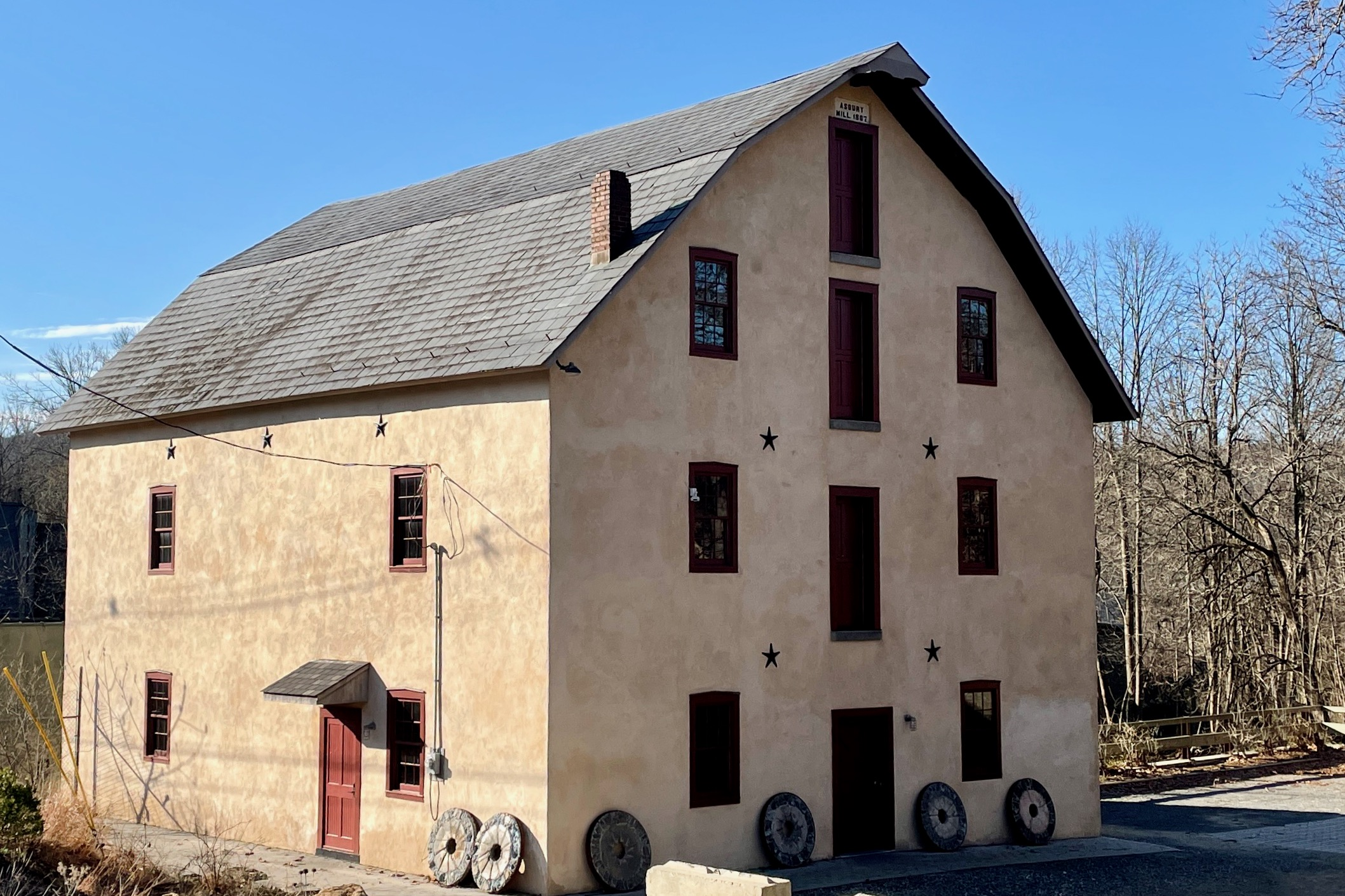
Hoffman Grist Mill

The Musconetcong Watershed Association uses the historic Hoffman Grist Mill for its programs on the social, agricultural and industrial heritage of the community. The mill contributes to the Asbury Historic District.

The Plenge Archaeological Site located along the Musconetcong River is one of two major Paleo-Indian sites in New Jersey.

== Notable people ==
People who were born in, residents of, or otherwise closely associated with Asbury include:

- Billy Osmun (born 1943), retired dirt modified racing driver
- Buzzie Reutimann (born 1941), former NASCAR driver
- David Reutimann (born 1970), professional stock car racing crew chief and former driver
