= Joseph Donahue =

Joseph or Joe Donahue may refer to:

- Joseph Donahue (poet), American poet, critic, and editor
- Joseph Patrick Donahue, American prelate of the Roman Catholic Church
- Joe Donahue (racing driver), American stock car driver
- Joe Donahue (actor), American dancer and actor
