= Bobby Cain =

American racing driver (born 1931)

- Born: Robert F. Cain; January 14, 1931 Columbia, Pennsylvania, U.S.
- Died: May 17, 2012 (aged 81)
- Retired: 2005

Motorsports career
- Debut season: 1947
- Car number: 36
- Championships: 2

Robert Cain (January 14, 1931 – May 17, 2012) was a pioneering American stock car and sprint car racing driver. Raised in the Pennsylvania Dutch Country he and his cars were known to racing fans as the "Quaker Shaker".

== Racing career ==
Cain began racing Midgets near his home in Pennsylvania at age 16. He moved to stock cars, competing at Lincoln, Reading, Susquehanna, and Williams Grove Speedways. A move to Key West, Florida found him racing at Hialeah Speedway. By 1955, Cain had relocated to New York, becoming a regular at Fulton and Lancaster Speedways, while winning track championships at the Maple Grove (Waterloo) and Weedsport Speedways.

In 1983, Cain turned his attention exclusively to the Empire Super Sprint Series with just his wife Linda as his pit crew. He proved again to be a winner, contending at the renown tracks of the northeast, including Brewerton Speedway, New York; Devil's Bowl Speedway in West Haven, Vermont; Merrittville Speedway in Ontario; and in Pennsylvania at Lernerville Speedway, Mercer Speedway, Sportsman Speedway (Knox), and Tri-City Speedway (Franklin).

Cain was still racing at age 74 when he was inducted into the Northeast Dirt Modified Hall of Fame in 2005.
