= Willie Allan (racing driver) =

American Dirt Modified racing driver (1930-2019)

Wee Willie Allan
- Born: William C. Allan; January 11, 1930 Marcellus, New York, U.S.
- Died: April 1, 2019 (aged 89)

Modified racing career
- Debut season: 1953
- Car number: A5
- Championships: 1
- Finished last season: 1979

William "Wee Willie" Allan (January 11, 1930 – April 1, 2019) was an American Dirt Modified racing driver. Always detectable on the track by flying a villainous skull and bones flag, and readily identifiable off the track because of his diminutive size, he was a favorite of the younger race fans.

== Racing career ==
"Wee Willie" started racing in 1953 at the Hemlock Speedway in the Finger Lakes region of New York. He focused his efforts on Central New York, including the Maple Grove Speedway in Waterloo, the Syracuse Mile, and claimed the 1964 track championship at Weedsport Speedway. Allan was also successful on his occasional trips to special events, including Lebanon Valley Speedway in West Lebanon, New York.

Allan began winding down his racing by switching to the dirt late model class and then retired in 1979. He continued his involvement in the sport for another decade as the official pace car driver for the Super DIRTcar Series and was inducted into the Northeast Dirt Modified Hall of Fame in 1993.
