= Bob Gatien =

Canadian Dirt Modified racing driver (1935-2010)

- Born: Robert Gatien; September 18, 1935 Saint-Dominique, Quebec, Canada
- Died: March 8, 2010 (aged 74)
- Retired: 1983

Modified racing career
- Debut season: 1955
- Car number: 397
- Championships: 12
- Wins: 200+

Previous series
- 1953-1954: Street Car

Robert Gatien (September 18, 1935 – March 8, 2010) was a Canadian Dirt Modified racing driver. He later joined a group of investors to purchase Rebel Speedway, renamed it to Autodrome Granby, Quebec, and became a respected promotor and an authority in track surface preparation.

== Racing career ==
Bob Gatien began his racing career in 1953 at age 17, racing his street car at Autodrome St. Guillaume. By 1955 he began focusing on running stock cars on the dirt ovals of Quebec, including Autodrome St-Grégoire, Autodrome Saint Guillaume, Autodrome Sorel, Fury Speedway in Laval, Kempton Park Raceway in La Praire, Mustang Speedway in Pike River, Sherbrooke Speedway, and Sainte Martine Speedway. Gatien claimed 9 track titles at Autodrome Drummond, and the 1969, 1970 and 1972 crowns at Rebel Speedway.

Gatien also ventured to the Brockville and Cornwall Speedways in Ontario and Devil's Bowl Speedway in West Haven, Vermont. He occasionally traveled to the New York State venues, including Airborne Park Speedway in Plattsburgh, Albany-Saratoga Speedway in Malta, Lebanon Valley Speedway, Orange County Fair Speedway in Middletown, the Syracuse Mile and Weedsport Speedway. He retired from driving in 1983 and returned to the sport two years later as part owner and promotor of Autodrome Granby.

Gatien was named Quebec's stock car athlete of the year in 1975 and was honored at the annual Gold Medal Gala in Montreal. He was inducted in the Northeast Dirt Modified Hall of Fame in 2002.
