= Wee Willie =

Wee Willie can refer to:

- Wee Willie Winkie, a Scottish nursery rhyme character
- Wee Willie Smith (1911–1992), American basketball player
- Wee Willie Smith (American football) (1910–1996), American football player
- Wee Willie Allan (1930 - 2019), American dirt modified racing driver

== Nicknames ==
- Bill Shoemaker, an American jockey
- Ervin Williams, a rockabilly musician

=== Major League Baseball players ===
- Willie Keeler
- Willie Bloomquist
- Willie Sudhoff
