= Ken Brenn Jr. =

American Dirt Modified racing driver (born 1952)

- Born: Kenneth Brenn Jr. April 20, 1952 Summit, New Jersey, U.S.
- Died: May 2, 2019 (aged 67)
- Retired: 1995

Modified racing career
- Debut season: 1972
- Car number: 24
- Championships: 5
- Wins: 104

Championship titles
- 1978 New Jersey State Modified Champion; 1985 New York State Fair Champion

Kenneth Brenn Jr. (April 20, 1952 – May 2, 2019) was an American modified racing driver who won more than 100 feature events at venues in the Mid-Atlantic states. Equally adept on both dirt and asphalt surfaces, he captured modified track titles on the dirt surface of New Jersey's Flemington Speedway and again after it was paved.

== Early life ==
Raised in Warren Township, New Jersey, Brenn graduated from Watchung Hills Regional High School and developed an interest in racing from his father, who had worked on race car maintenance.

== Racing career ==
Brenn won the first-ever rookie championship at Flemington in 1972, and after moving up a class, took the Sportsman championship the next year. In 1975, he posted the first of his 18 Modified victories at the East Windsor Speedway, New Jersey. In 1982 and 1983, Brenn claimed Flemington's modified titles and ultimately totaled 59 modified triumphs on the dirt surface.

Brenn won the 1983 Independence Day race and the 1985 New York State Fair Championship at the Syracuse Mile. He also won the 1979 pole position for the Super Dirt Week main event at Syracuse, but surprisingly took only two top five finishes in 17 appearances.

Brenn was inducted into the Northeast Dirt Modified Hall of Fame in 2009.

== Personal life ==
Breen comes from a racing family, as brother Jimmy also drove modifieds. His father, Ken Brenn Sr. was a well-respected Midget car owner in United States Auto Club (USAC) and American Racing Drivers Club circles before his involvement with modifieds. Brenn Sr. also entered several USAC Champ car events, including 1967 Indianapolis 500 for driver Bob Harkey. Brenn Sr. was also honored by the Northeast Dirt Modified Hall of Fame in receiving the 2015 car owner award.
