= Sammy Beavers =

American Dirt Modified racing driver (born 1940)

- Born: Samuel P. Beavers; June 2, 1940 (age 86)
- Retired: 1996

Modified racing career
- Years active: 1958-1996
- Car number: 43, 81 ,121
- Championships: 4
- Wins: 113

Previous series
- 1972 1992 Championships: Sprint car Late model 1

Championship titles
- 1974 New Jersey State Modified Champion

Sammy Beavers (born June 2, 1940) is a retired American Dirt Modified racing driver. Beavers is known for his philanthropic work and annual holiday party for the children at the Matheny School in Peapack, New Jersey.

== Racing career ==
Beavers began racing in the novice division at the Nazareth Speedway, Pennsylvania, in 1958 with a 1939 Ford coupe powered by a 1953 Mercury flathead engine. He later joined the Sportsman ranks, winning the 1961-1962 title at Flemington Speedway, New Jersey. Beavers' first Modified victory was the inaugural feature race at the Harmony Speedway, New Jersey, in 1963.

Beavers went on to compete successfully at tracks of the Mid-Atlantic, including the New York speedways of Albany-Saratoga in Malta, Five Mile Point in Kirkwood, Fonda, Syracuse Fairgrounds, and Orange County Fairgrounds in Middletown; Langhorne and Reading Fairgrounds Speedways in Pennsylvania: and the East Windsor and Trenton Speedways in New Jersey.

Beavers was inducted into the Eastern Motorsports Press Association and the Northeast Dirt Modified Halls of fame.
