= Otto Harwi =

American Dirt Modified racing driver (1923-1964)

- Born: Howard Otto Harwi; February 2, 1923 Easton, Pennsylvania, U.S.
- Died: May 16, 1964 (aged 41)
- Debut season: 1949

Modified racing career
- Car number: 1, 999
- Championships: 5
- Finished last season: 1964

Otto Harwi (February 2, 1923 – May 16, 1964) was a pioneering American Dirt Modified racing driver from Easton, Pennsylvania.

== Racing career ==
Otto Harwi began racing in 1949 and quickly established himself on the Mid-Atlantic dirt tracks. He would regularly compete at Alcyon Speedway in Pitman and Flemington Speedway, New Jersey; Victory Speedway in Middletown, New York; and Dorney Park in Allentown and Nazareth Speedway, Pennsylvania, the last of which he was five-time track champion.

Otto Harwi sustained a fatal injury in a racing accident at Victory Speedway in 1964. He was inducted into the Northeast Dirt Modified Hall of Fame in 2001.
