= Ivan Little (racing driver) =

Canadian Dirt Modified racing driver (1938 - 2023)

- Born: Donald W. Little; February 23, 1938
- Died: October 23, 2023 (aged 85)
- Retired: 1986
- Debut season: 1955

Modified racing
- Car number: 61
- Championships: 4
- Wins: 200+

Championship titles
- 1970 Southern Tier Open

Donald "Ivan" Little (February 23, 1938 – October 25, 2023) was a Canadian dirt modified racing driver from St. Catherines, Ontario. He competed in the Niagara Falls regions of both the United States and Canada.

== Racing career ==
Ivan Little began racing cutdown roadsters on asphalt in the mid-1950s, but by 1965 had focused on running stock cars on the Ontario dirt ovals of Merrittville Speedway in Thorold and Speedway Park in Hamilton. He claimed the 1966 and 1983 track championships at Merrittville as well as the 1970 divisional champion at Humberstone Speedway ON, and the 1971 Modified champion at Ransomville Speedway NY. Little would also compete on the Syracuse Mile, and won the inaugural Southern Tier Open at Five Mile Point Speedway in Kirkwood NY.

Ivan Little retired from racing in 1986 with over 200 feature wins to his credit. He was inducted into the Northeast Dirt Modified Hall of Fame in 1996 and entered the St. Catherines Sports Hall of Fame in 1999.
