= Maynard Troyer =

Former NASCAR driver

- Born: November 22, 1938; Spencerport, New York
- Died: May 10, 2018 (aged 79)
- Achievements: 1970 All Star Stock Car Racing League Champion; 1976, 1977 Race of Champions
- Awards: 2018 Northeast Dirt Modified Hall of Fame Engineering Award

NASCAR Cup Series career
- 14 races run over 2 years
- Best finish: 38th (1971)
- First race: 1971 Daytona 500 (Daytona)
- Last race: 1973 Daytona 500 (Daytona)
Wins	Top tens	Poles
0	3	0

Maynard Troyer (November 22, 1938 – May 10, 2018) was a NASCAR Winston Cup Series driver who raced in the 1971 and the 1973 Winston Cup seasons.

== Career ==
Troyer achieved one top-five finish (at the 1971 Yankee 400), three top-ten finishes, and 3259.1 accumulated miles (1,767 laps) of racing experience. Maynard was a runner-up for the 1971 NASCAR Rookie of the Year award (Walter Ballard won the title because he competed in more races than Troyer did).

Troyer was a competitor at the 1971 Daytona 500 when, on lap 9 of that race, he lost control in turn two. Troyer's engine blew and his bright orange-red Ford hit the apron sideways at full speed and began tumbling so fast, it was almost impossible to count the number of flips. Press estimates, at the time, ranged from 15 to 18 flips, but viewing the race film in slow-motion showed that the car rolled over exactly 15 times, finally coming to rest back on its wheels. Troyer was seriously hurt, but recovered to compete again in 1973. Troyer finished his career with a total amount of earnings set at $14,940 ($108,354.2 when adjusted for inflation).

Intermediate tracks were Maynard's best racing experiences; giving him an average finish of 22nd place. However, Troyer had difficulties at the tri-oval tracks where he would finish in a lackluster 31st place.

== Post-NASCAR life ==
Troyer founded Troyer Engineering, one of the leading asphalt and dirt modified chassis builders in the Northeastern United States in 1977.

Troyer retired from the company in 1990, and sold it in 1998 to his business partner.

Troyer died in 2018.

== Motorsports career results ==
=== NASCAR ===
(key) (Bold – Pole position awarded by qualifying time. Italics – Pole position earned by points standings or practice time. * – Most laps led.)

==== Winston Cup Series ====
NASCAR Winston Cup Series results
Year	Team	No.	Make	1	2	3	4	5	6	7	8	9	10	11	12	13	14	15	16	17	18	19	20	21	22	23	24	25	26	27	28	29	30	31	32	33	34	35	36	37	38	39	40	41	42	43	44	45	46	47	48	NGNC	Pts	Ref
1971	Nagle Racers	60	Ford	RSD	DAY	DAY; 8	DAY; 38	ONT	RCH	CAR	HCY	BRI	ATL; 20	CLB	GPS	SMR	NWS	MAR	DAR	SBO																																38th	879	
1971	Nagle Racers	60	Mercury																		TAL; 21	ASH	KPT	CLT; 37	DOV	MCH; 30	RSD	HOU	GPS	DAY; 14	BRI	AST	ISP	TRN; 8	NSV	ATL	BGS	ONA	MCH; 4	TAL; 44	CLB	HCY	DAR	MAR	CLT; 35	DOV; 28	CAR; 41	MGR	RCH	NWS	TWS	38th	879	
1973	Nagle Racers	60	Ford	RSD	DAY; 23	RCH	CAR	BRI	ATL	NWS	DAR	MAR	TAL	NSV	CLT	DOV	TWS	RSD	MCH	DAY	BRI	ATL	TAL	NSV	DAR	RCH	DOV	NWS	MAR	CLT	CAR																					98th	-	

===== Daytona 500 =====
Year	Team	Manufacturer	Start	Finish
1971	Nagle Racers	Ford	18	38
1973	Nagle Racers	Ford	21	23
