= Bob Rossell =

American modified racing driver (1936–2026)

- Born: Robert W. Rossell; September 23, 1936 Wrightstown, New Jersey, U.S.
- Died: March 24, 2026 (aged 89) Jacobstown, New Jersey, U.S.
- Debut season: 1958

Modified racing career
- Car number: 56
- Wins: 51+
- Finished last season: 1977

Robert W. Rossell (September 23, 1936 – March 24, 2026) was an American pioneering driver of modified stock cars. Before his retirement, he was also a much sought-after car builder and fabricator, with many top drivers finding success in Rossell racers, with its signature square tubing.

== Racing career ==
Rossell began his career in 1958 at what is now New Egypt Speedway, New Jersey, with an old Chevy coupe and a junkyard engine. He has since competed and been victorious at the renowned northeast racetracks including Flemington Speedway and Old Bridge Speedway in New Jersey; Langhorne Speedway and Nazareth Speedway in Pennsylvania; Orange County Fair Speedway in Middletown, New York; Marlboro Motor Raceway in Maryland, and the Southside Speedway in Midlothian, Virginia.

Rossell captured NASCAR' s Battle of Bull Run at Old Dominion Speedway in Manassas, Virginia in 1963, and twice won the Garden State Classic at Wall Stadium, New Jersey. He was first to cross the finish line in the1963 New Yorker 400 at Utica-Rome Speedway in Vernon, New York, but the win was reversed when NASCAR determined fellow driver Rene Charland had pushed Rossell across the line when he ran out of gas.

== Retirement and death ==
After his retirement from racing, Rossell went on to a second career building sulkies for Standardbred horses. He was inducted into the Eastern Motorsports Press Association and the Northeast Dirt Modified Halls of Fame.

Rossell died after a long illness in Jacobstown, New Jersey, on March 24, 2026, at the age of 89.
