= Asbury Historic District =

Historic district in New Jersey, United States

- U.S. National Register of Historic Places
- New Jersey Register of Historic Places
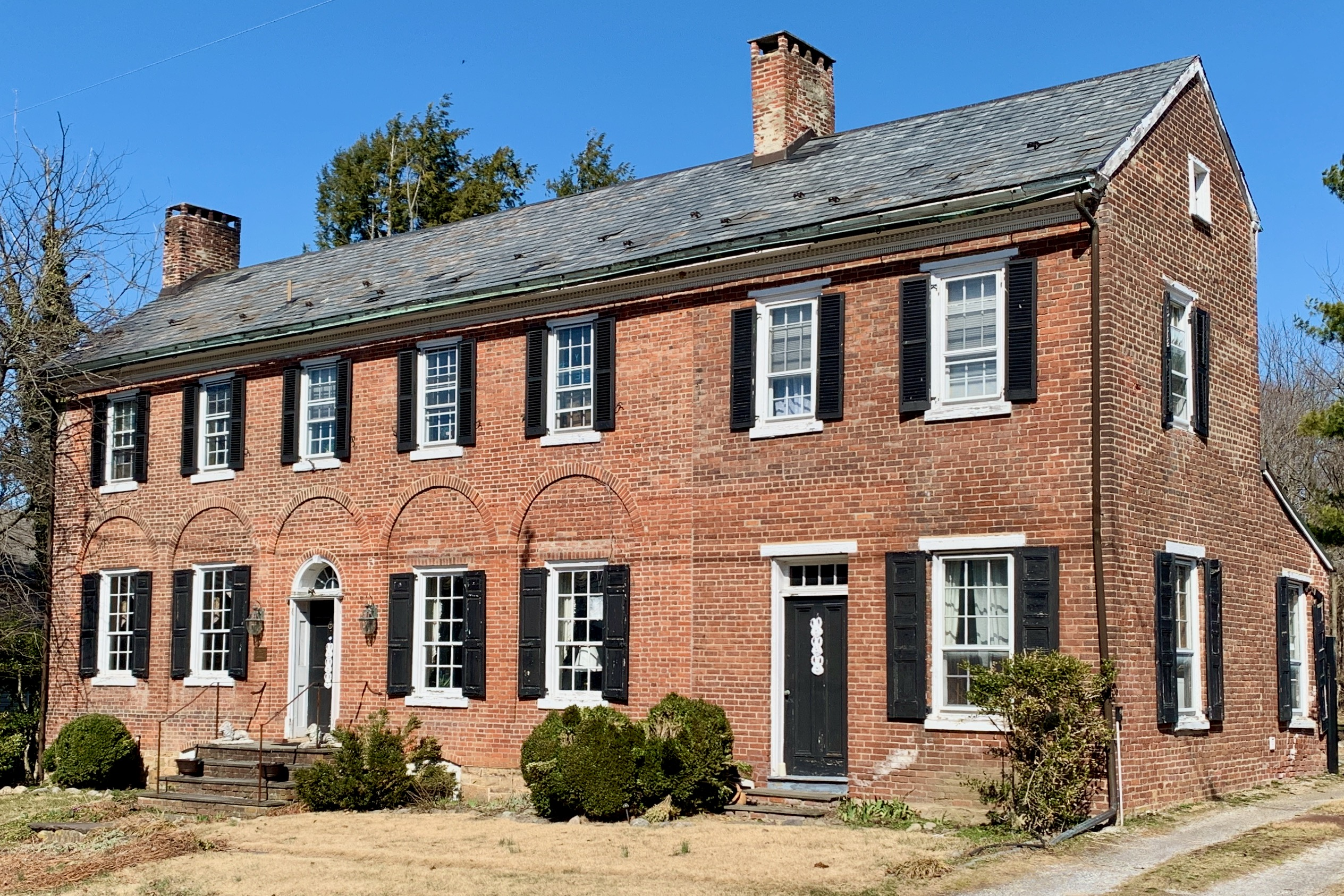
- Warne-Castner House

- Location within Warren County, New Jersey Location within Hunterdon County, New Jersey Location within New Jersey Location within the United States
- Location: County Routes 632 and 643, Maple Avenue, Kitchen Road, and School Street, Asbury, New Jersey
- Coordinates: 40°41′53″N 75°00′50″W
- Area: 288 acres (117 ha)
- Built by: William M. Michler
- Architectural style: Greek Revival, Georgian, Federal
- NRHP reference No.: 93000132
- NJRHP No.: 2749

Significant dates
- Added to NRHP: March 19, 1993
- Designated NJRHP: November 2, 1992

The Asbury Historic District is a 288-acre (117 ha) historic district encompassing the community of Asbury in Franklin Township of Warren County, New Jersey. It is bounded by County Route 632 (Asbury Anderson Road), County Route 643 (Old Main Street), Maple Avenue, Kitchen Road, and School Street and extends along the Musconetcong River into Bethlehem Township of Hunterdon County. It was listed on the National Register of Historic Places on March 19, 1993, for its significance in architecture, industry, religion, community development, politics/government, and commerce. The district includes 141 contributing buildings, a contributing structure, two contributing sites, and four contributing objects.

== Description ==
The Warne-Castner House is a two-story brick building with Federal and Greek Revival influences. The rear wing is dated late 18th century, with the main block built from 1815 to 1818 and extended in 1846. Elisha S. Warne bought the property in 1815 and sold it to Reverend Jacob Castner in 1818.

The Asbury United Methodist Church is a one-story brick building with a two and one-half story brick tower. It was built in 1914 with Victorian Gothic style. It is the third church constructed at this site. The first was founded by William McCullough and Bishop Francis Asbury in 1796. The second was built in 1842.

The district includes the Colonial Revival-style McCullough House, whose appearance was created by a major remodeling in c. 1908 to design by Easton architect William M. Michler. The Italianate style Brown/Wyckoff House was built c. 1855–60 by Dr. Robert B. Brown. It was then owned by Martin Wyckoff. The Greek Revival style Richey/Bristol House was built c. 1840–50 and bought by Catherine Richey. It was inherited by her daughter Anna Richey Bristol.

The former Presbyterian Church, built 1868–69, and the former elementary school, built 1919, both on School Street, are now residences. The church shows Italianate and Romanesque Revival styles.

Located along the Musconetcong River, the Hoffman Grist Mill was built c. 1863 for James M. Hoffman. In 1895, Harry M. Riddle founded the Asbury Graphite Company and converted the mill to a commercial graphite mill. It remained in operation until 1970. The Asbury Graphite Laboratory, located in Bethlehem Township, was built c. 1925–40.

== Gallery ==
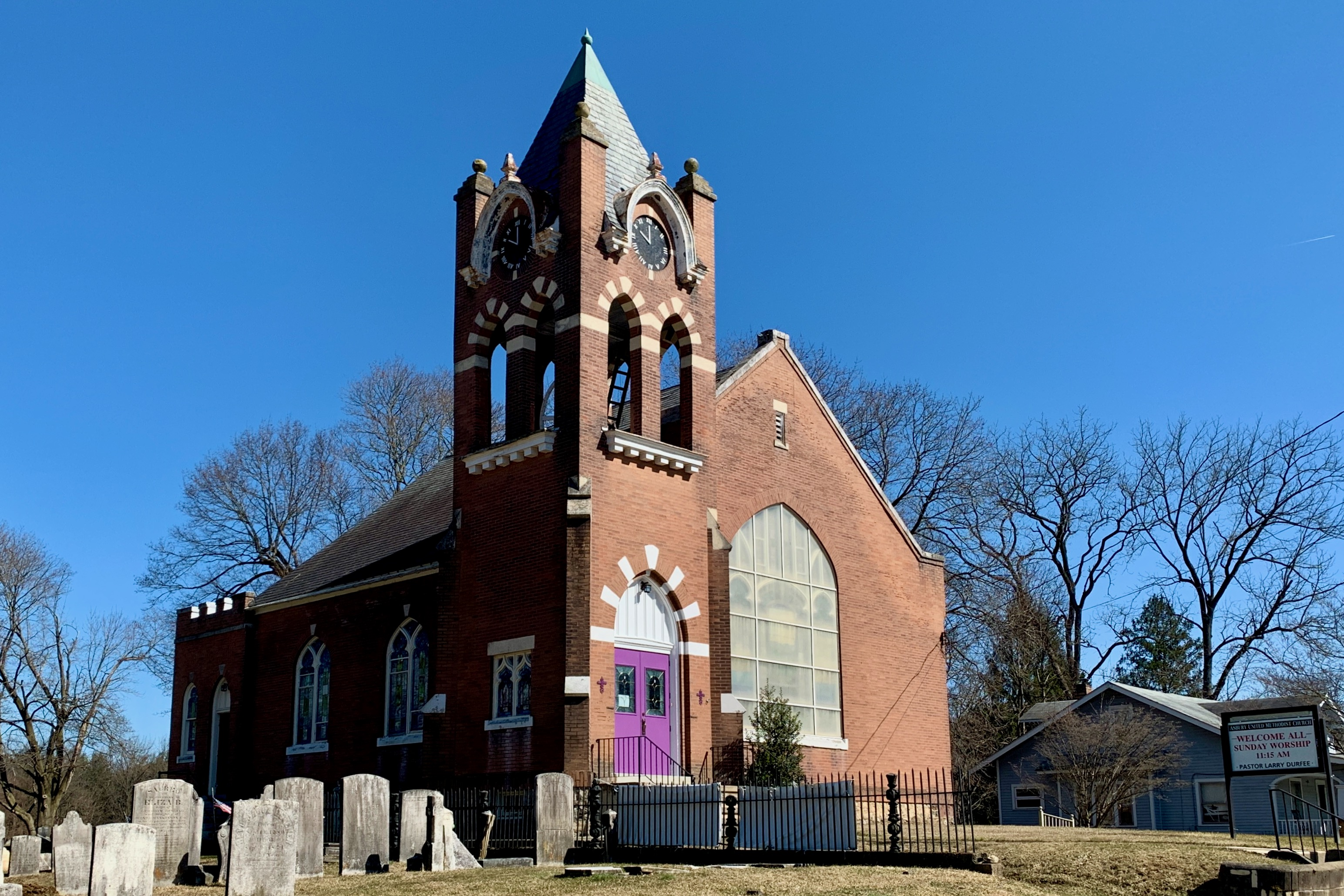
Asbury United Methodist Church

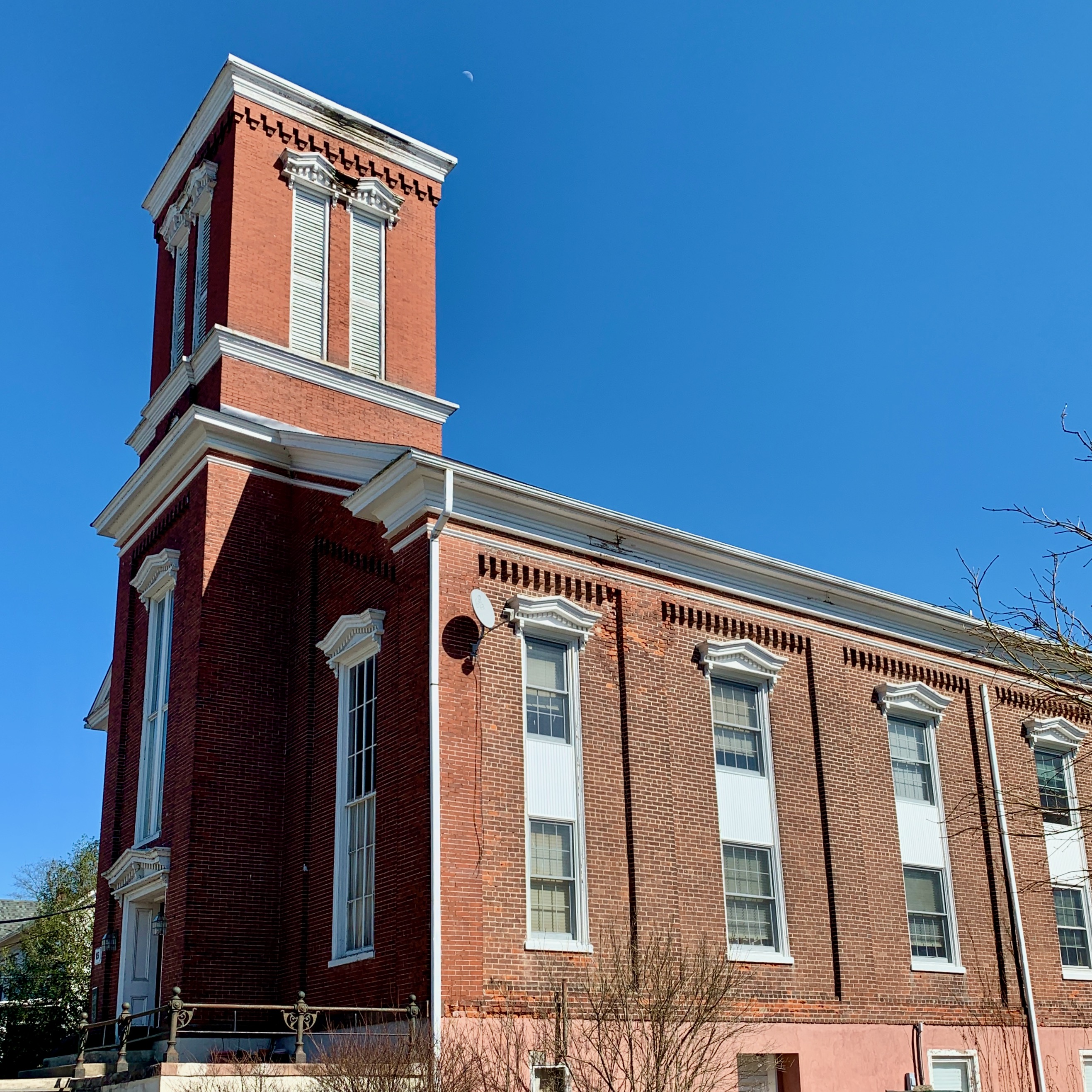
Former Presbyterian Church

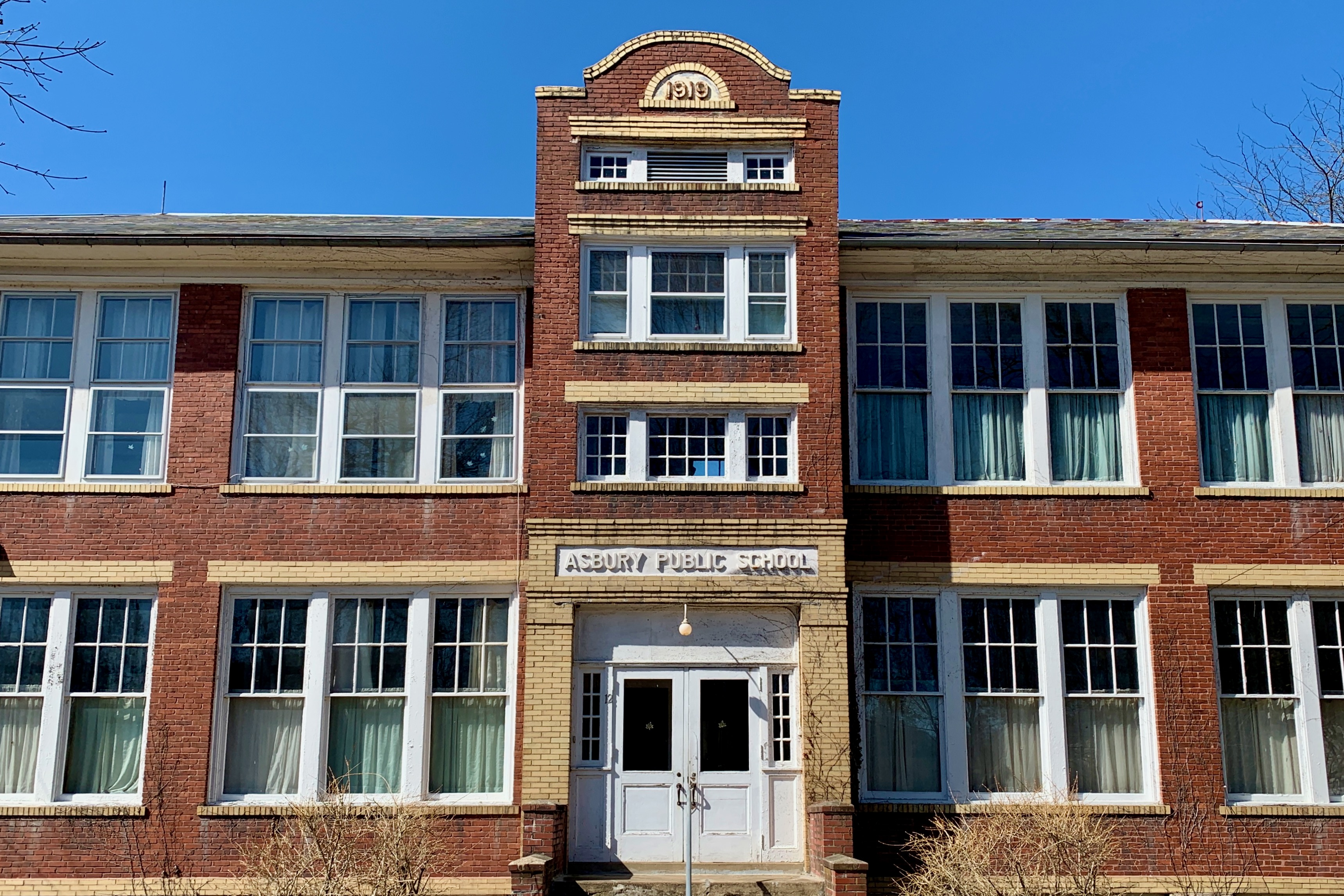
Former elementary school

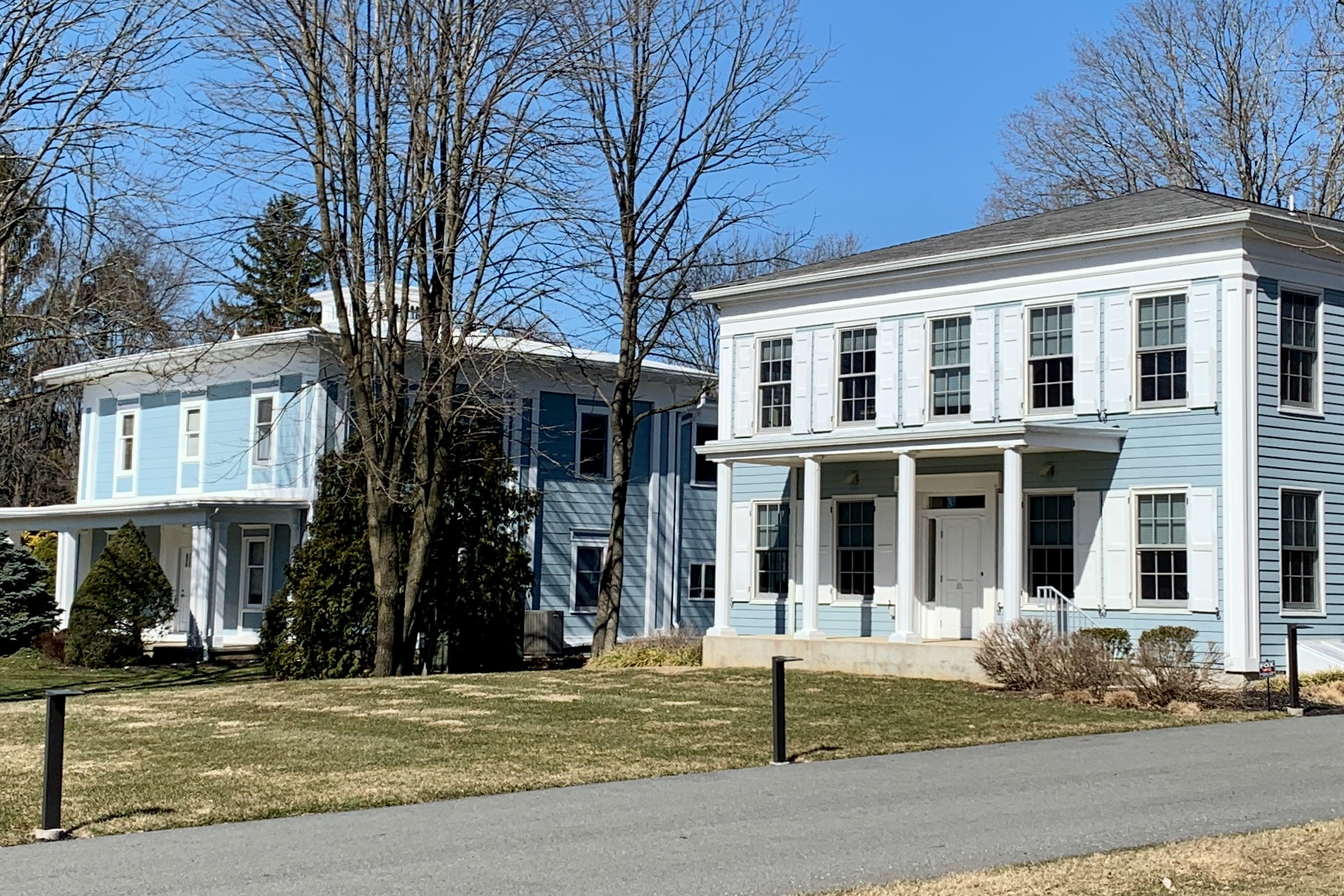
Brown/Wyckoff and Richey/Bristol Houses

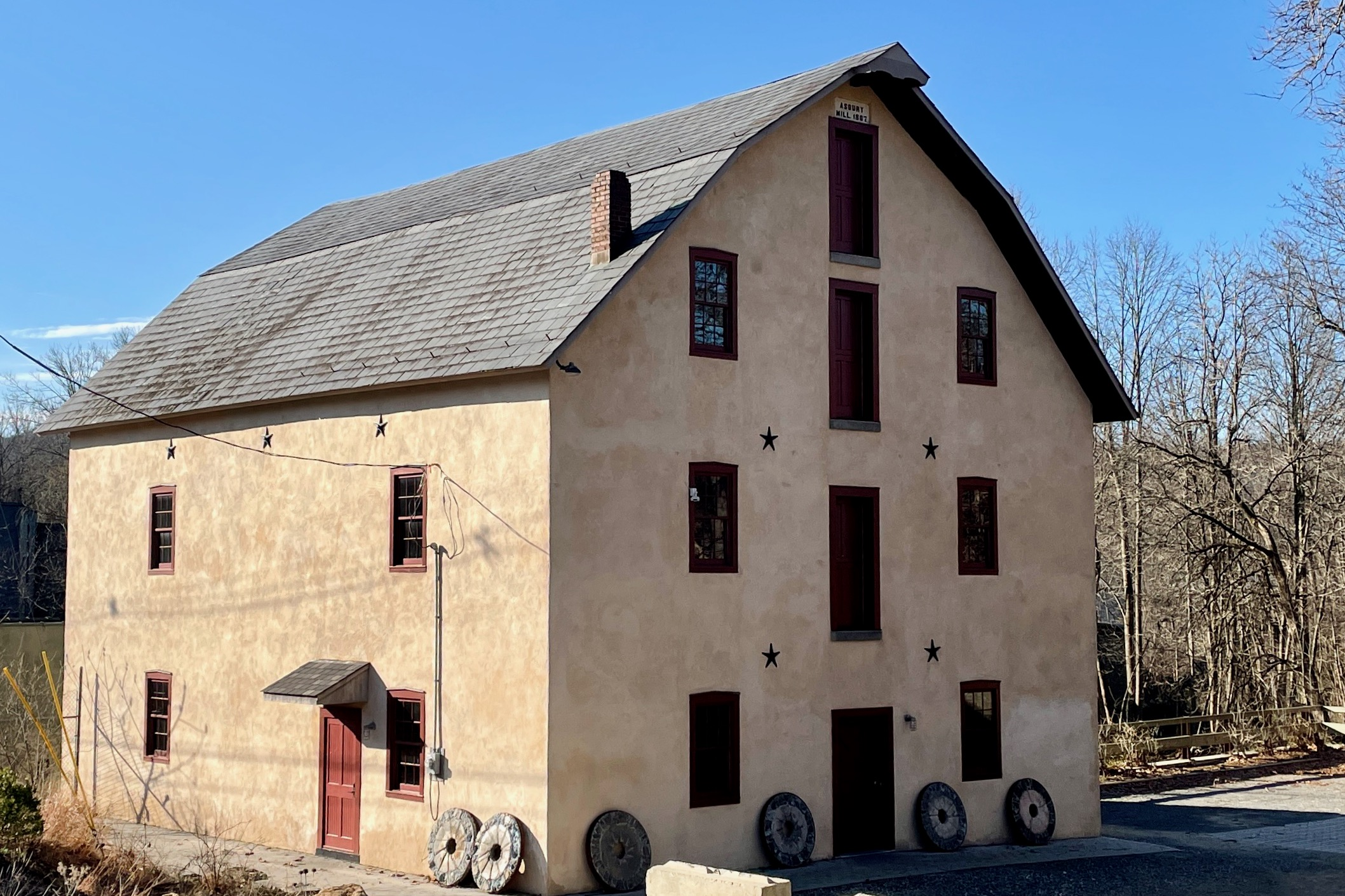
Hoffman Grist Mill

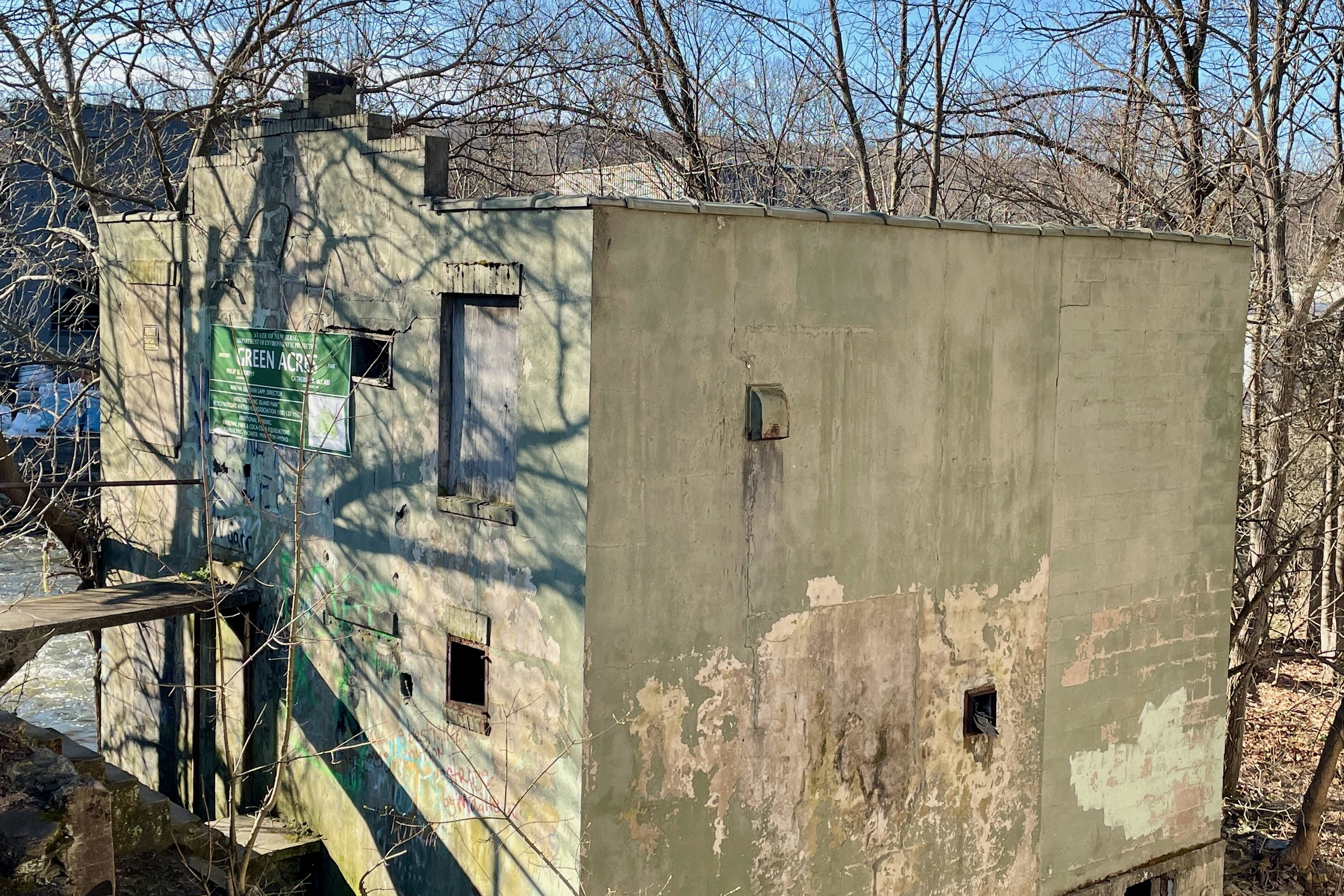
Asbury Graphite Laboratory

== See also ==
- National Register of Historic Places listings in Warren County, New Jersey
- National Register of Historic Places listings in Hunterdon County, New Jersey
