= US 13 Dragway =

Coordinates: 38.4732°N 75.5628°W

The US 13 Dragway is an IHRA sanctioned drag racing facility. Its track is 3,600 ft (1,100 m) long, and has spectator seating for 2730 fans. It is located in Delmar, Delaware along with its sister track the Delaware International Speedway. The complex is one of Delaware's largest attractions.
