= Glen Aubrey Raceway =

Defunct motorsport venue in Glen Aubrey, New York

- Location: Glen Aubrey, New York
- Coordinates: 42.2593°N 76.0047°W
- Opened: 1951
- Closed: 1967
- Former names: Glen Aubrey Speedway

Oval
- Surface: Clay
- Length: .4 km (0.25 mi)
- Turns: 4

Glen Aubrey Raceway was a one-quarter mile dirt oval raceway located in the Southern Tier Region of New York State.

== Overview ==
Glen Aubrey Raceway was opened by Bernard Hodges on June 1, 1951, and the first feature event was captured by Bud Naylor of Cortland, New York.

The racetrack was originally sanctioned by the Southern Tier Stock Car Association, a group of drivers who also supported nearby Shangri-La Speedway, and Glen Aubrey events were slated for Friday nights to avoid conflicts. However, the promoters soon transferred to the Finger Lakes Stock Car Racing Association.

As the venue began its second decade the Modern (late model) cars became the featured class, and following the 1962 season the promoters switched weekly events to Saturday night.

A plot to rob the raceway of its gate receipts was foiled by team of State Police led by LT. Supervisor Edgar D. Croswell, who had earlier coordinated the break-up of what the authorities called the biggest meeting of organized crime at the home of Joseph Barbara Sr. in nearby Apalachin, New York.

In 1965 promoter Chet Shultz stepped in to operate the facility, and the following year Bob Pendell and Dick Gleason took charge, switching back to Friday nights and scheduling events to test spectator and competitor interest in resurrecting the venue. The racetrack was closed after the 1967 season and the property was transitioned to a mobile home park.
