= Woodhull Raceway =

Motorsport venue in Woodhull, New York

- Location: Woodhull, New York
- Coordinates: 42.1014°N 77.4033°W
- Owner: Terry and Nikki Brewer
- Opened: 1965
- Website: www.woodhullraceway.com

Oval
- Surface: Red Clay
- Length: .55 km (0.34 mi)
- Turns: 4
- Banking: High-banked

Woodhull Raceway is a third-mile high-banked dirt oval raceway located in the Southern Tier Region of New York State.

== Overview ==
Woodhull Raceway was opened in 1965 by George Williams who with his two sons, Jim and Bob designed and constructed the track. The family maintained it for its first 33 years. For much of its first decade, the track featured factory stock race cars in classes based on the year of the car and the size of the engines.

In 2020 Terry and Nikki Brewer purchased the Woodhull Raceway from Ted and Brandi White who had taken ownership in 2010. The Brewers had previously campaigned a motorsports program with driver Steve Hartman Jr. at the track.

== Events ==
Since 1976, modified racing has headlined the weekly show, where standout driver Billy Van Pelt claimed 23 track titles. Joining the modifieds are Late Models, Crate Sportsman, Street Stocks, Hobby Stocks, 4 Cylinder Mini Stocks, Front Wheel Drives and a youth 4-Cylinder division called the Woodhull Warriors.

Touring groups and special events have included the Short Track Super Series Modifieds, the Empire Super Sprints, and the Patriot Sprint Tour 360 Sprints.
