= Georgetown Speedway =

Race track in Georgetown, Delaware

Coordinates: 38.6514°N 75.3642°W

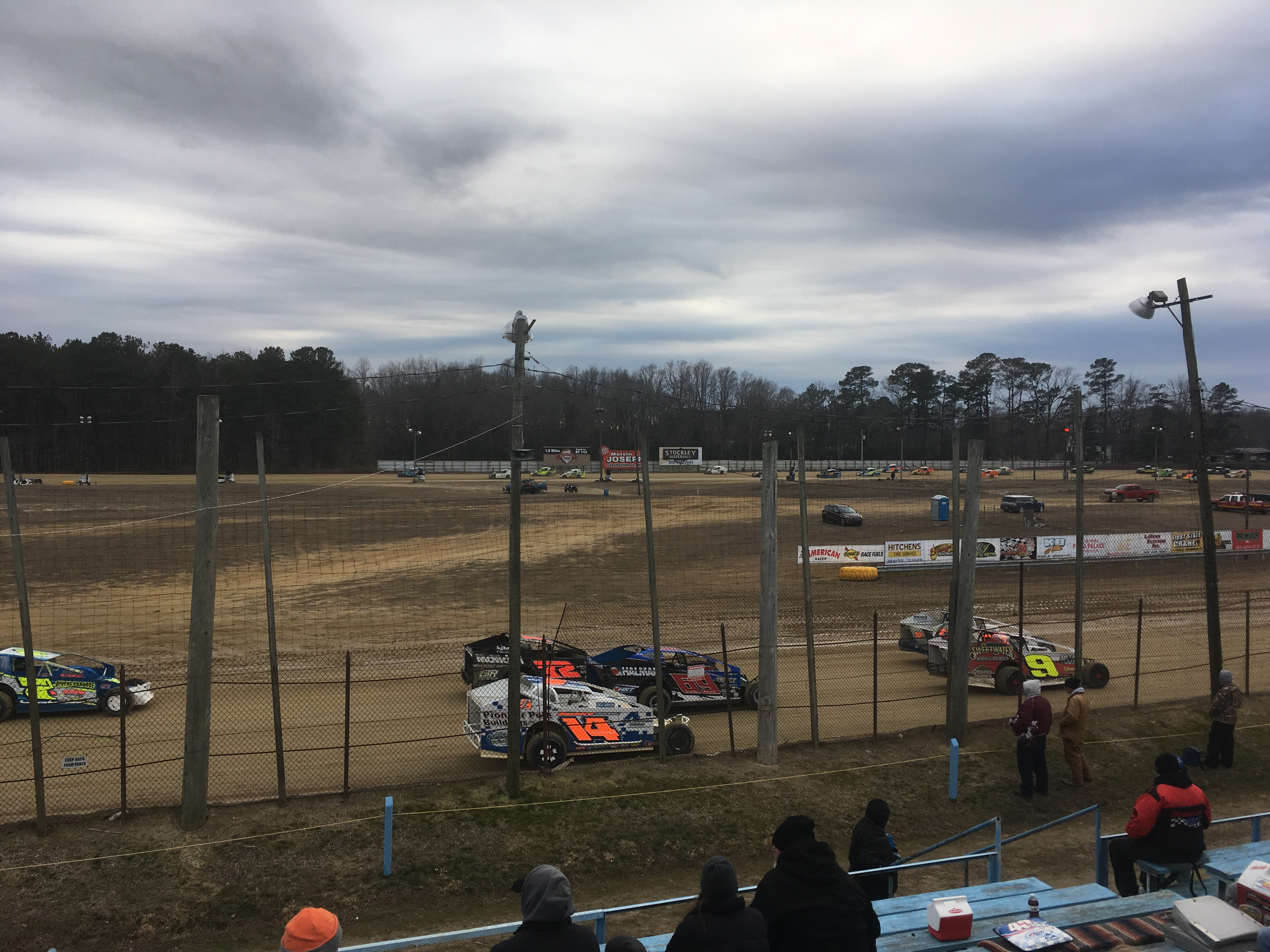
- Modified and sportsman cars at Georgetown Speedway
- Location: Georgetown, Delaware
- Operator: BD Motorsports Media LLC
- Opened: 1949

Oval
- Surface: Clay
- Length: 0.50 mi (0.8 km)
- Turns: 4

Georgetown Speedway is a 1/2 mile dirt oval located at the intersection of U.S. Route 113 and Speedway Road in Georgetown, Delaware. The track is a 40-minute drive from Ocean City, Maryland and miles from the Delaware Beaches. Attendance on some nights is boosted by fans coming via the Cape May–Lewes Ferry from New Jersey. Georgetown Speedway features a fast, half-mile clay oval that produces high speeds and thrilling racing action. The facility has grandstands, parking, a large, flat pit area, and room for overnight camping.

Constructed in 1949 by businessman and auto racing pioneer Melvin L. Joseph, Georgetown Speedway is not only an historic landmark in Delaware, but is well known across the country for its role in the development of stock car racing as it is known today.

After sitting silent for a number of years the speedway was reopened in May 2006. In 2015 the track was slightly shortened by reconfiguring turns one and two, bringing them in several feet further. The track had previously been believed to be measured as a half mile on the inside; now it is believed to be measured as a half mile on the outside.

BD Motorsports Media LLC is managing the speedway's operations since 2016. A special-events schedule of high-profile programs was planned to bring some of the region's top talent to Sussex County, Delaware. The current management team revamped the track throughout the 2016 season, including fresh paint, new improved signage, track maintenance equipment, and a revamped sound system. Multiple touring series, including Big/Small Block Modifieds, Super Late Models, and 360 Sprint cars are now featured at the track. More improvements were announced for the 2017 season such as a lap counter and scoreboard that was purchased from the former Thunder Valley Speedway in Central City, Pennsylvania.
