= Skyline Raceway Motorsports Park =

Motorsport venue in Virgil, New York

- Location: Virgil, New York
- Coordinates: 42.5419°N 76.1168°W
- Owner: Bradley Smith
- Opened: 1962
- Former names: Skyline Speedway, Skyline Raceway
- Website: www.skylineracewaymotorsportspark.com

Oval
- Surface: Clay
- Length: .6 km (0.37 mi)
- Turns: 4

Skyline Raceway Motorsports Park is a three-eighths mile dirt oval raceway located in Central New York State.

== Overview ==
Buck Townsley built the Skyline Speedway on top of a mountain and opened it in 1962. The track continued operating with several different promoters through 1976 and then reopened for a single year in 1980. The facility lay dormant until Frank and Gene Payne brought it back to life for the 1988 racing season, headlining with the Late Model division.

Former track champion Dean Catlin and his wife Donna took over operations in 2016, and then Brad Smith purchased the track in 2022.

== Events ==
The Skyline Raceway Motorsports Park offers auto racing throughout the summer in what has been described as a family friendly environment -- where one can bring their lawn chair and cooler of food to sit in front and relax. The track features the Crate Late Models, Sportsman, 600 cc Modifieds, Factory Stock, and Four Cylinders. The venue also hosts the CRSA winged Sprint Cars annually.
