= Delaware International Speedway =

Motorsport venue in Delaware

Coordinates: 38.469°N 75.561°W

The Delaware International Speedway is a 1/2 mile dirt track racing venue located in Delmar, Delaware, United States along with its sister track the US 13 Dragway. It is a half-mile clay oval track that has been hosting auto racing events since its establishment in 1963. The speedway is a popular destination for racing enthusiasts and has a rich history of hosting various racing events, including dirt track racing, modifieds and sprint cars.

The track hosts a variety of racing series and special events throughout the racing season, attracting both local and national drivers. Delaware International Speedway is known for its fast and challenging racing surface.

The facility has undergone several improvements and upgrades over the years to enhance the overall racing experience and accommodate larger crowds. It offers modern amenities for spectators and participants, making it a popular venue for both seasoned racing fans and newcomers to the sport. The track seats 5,000 and is one of Delaware's largest attractions.
