= Maple Grove Speedway =

Motorsport venue in Waterloo, New York

- Location: Waterloo, New York
- Coordinates: 42.9114°N 76.8529°W
- Owner: Seneca County Agricultural Society
- Opened: 1935
- Closed: 1977
- Former names: Waterloo Speedway, Seneca County Fairgrounds

Oval
- Surface: Clay
- Length: .8 km (0.50 mi)
- Turns: 4

Maple Grove Speedway was a red clay surfaced, one-half mile egg-shaped oval raceway located in the Finger Lakes Region of New York State.

== Overview ==
The Seneca County Agricultural Society purchased the Maple Grove Racetrack and surrounding property in 1882 to host the annual county fair. In addition to horse racing, it began hosting automobile racing in the early 20th century.

Between 1953 and 1971 the facility was known as the Maple Grove Speedway. The Waterloo Stock Car Association and its successor, the Maple Grove Raceway Association, sponsored stock car racing Saturday nights during the summer months. The track featured up to four classes based on engine specifications: modified unlimited, modified flatheads, in-line sixes, and stock overhead.

The track lay dormant four years before former car owners Dominick Tantalo and Tony Vitti signed a two-year lease in 1976, reopening the venue as the Waterloo Speedway. NASCAR veteran Mike McLaughlin lived a few blocks from the fairgrounds and, in anticipation of the re-opening, built his first car in his home garage. According to his mother, he drove the car to the track on his first night of racing.

Tantalo died unexpectedly in May 1977, and the community protested the noise and dust caused by the races. The Waterloo Speedway's final event was a New York State Late Model Championship on August 13th, 1977, and except for some exhibition events, auto racing did not return to the venue.
