= Rolling Wheels Raceway =

Motorsport venue in Elbridge, New York

Coordinates: 43°0′57.48″N 76°29′42.98″W

- Location: Elbridge, New York
- Opened: 1969
- Closed: 2017

Oval
- Surface: Clay
- Length: 1 km (0.62 mi)
- Turns: 4

Rolling Wheels Raceway a.k.a. Rolling Wheels Raceway Park was a 5/8 mile dirt oval raceway in Elbridge, New York. Canadian Lloyd Holt won the first full season track title in 1970.

== History ==
Rolling Wheels was built by Robert M. Petrocci with the first race at the facility held in August 1969. The following summer Petrocci was fatally injured while visiting the Spencer Speedway when a race car became airborne and crashed into the pit-side grandstands. Petrocci's sons Robert Jr. and Darryl took over operations at the track, and soon teamed up with promoter Glenn Donnelly to become one of the three original tracks that made up Drivers Independent Race Tracks (DIRT).

Donnelly, along with Bruno DeMatteo and Paul Vitale purchased the speedway from the Petrocci family, and promoted it as a "specials only" venue until selling it to the World Racing Group (then Boundless Motorsports) in 2004. In 2014, investors Bill Mendick and Bert Butler purchased the facility and hired Donnelly as manager and event promoter. Jeremie Corcoran took over promotional duties for 2016, and in 2017 Paul Szmal was bought in as race director.

The final race held August 10, 2017 was captured by Gary Tomkins A monster truck event on September 9, 2017, was the last event presented at the venue.
