= Modified racing =

Racing events with modified factory autos

Modified stock car racing
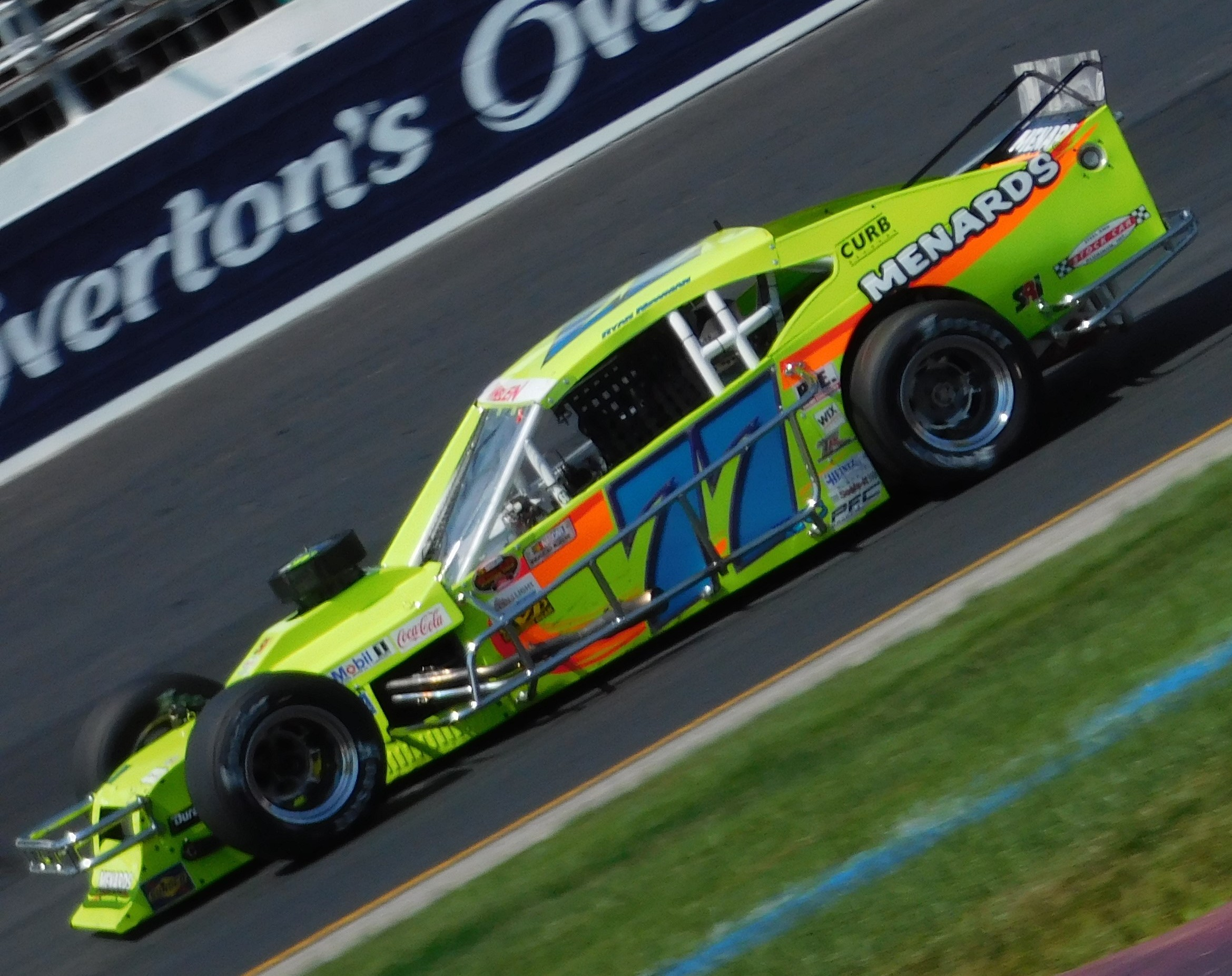
- A modern asphalt modified

Characteristics
- Contact: Yes
- Team members: Yes
- Type: Outdoor, Indoor

Modified stock car racing, also known as modified racing and modified, is a type of auto racing that involves purpose-built cars simultaneously racing against each other on oval tracks. First established in the United States after World War II, this type of racing was early-on characterized by its participants' modification of passenger cars in pursuit of higher speeds, hence the name.

There are many sanctioning bodies for modifieds, each specifying different body styles and engine sizes.

== History ==
A typical early "modified stock car" was, as its name implies, generally a stock automobile, with the glass removed, a roll cage installed, and a souped-up motor. NASCAR began by organizing the modifieds, and ran its first race in Daytona Beach in February 1948 at the beach road course. (In June 1949, NASCAR organized its first "strictly stock" later model car race at Charlotte, North Carolina, which evolved into its well known premiere division.)

In the early years, most cars just had modified engines. What started out as minor modifications to the cars became visibly apparent as the bodies were channeled and lowered. It became known for technical advancements and innovation, as car builders started mixing and matching components from different car makers. Modified racing remained popular, particularly on the east coast, and until the early 1970s, drivers typically competed on both dirt and asphalt surfaces with the same car.

Modified cars resemble a hybrid of open-wheel cars and full-fendered stock cars, as the rear wheels are covered by fenders but the front wheels and engine are left exposed. The class might more accurately be referred to as Open Wheel Modifieds to better distinguish it from both "strictly stock" and other full-fendered race cars that are highly modified (late models). Most modified classes are no longer based on any current production vehicles, and each sanctioning body has their own set of guidelines provided in an annual rule book and their own registration fees.

== Asphalt modified ==
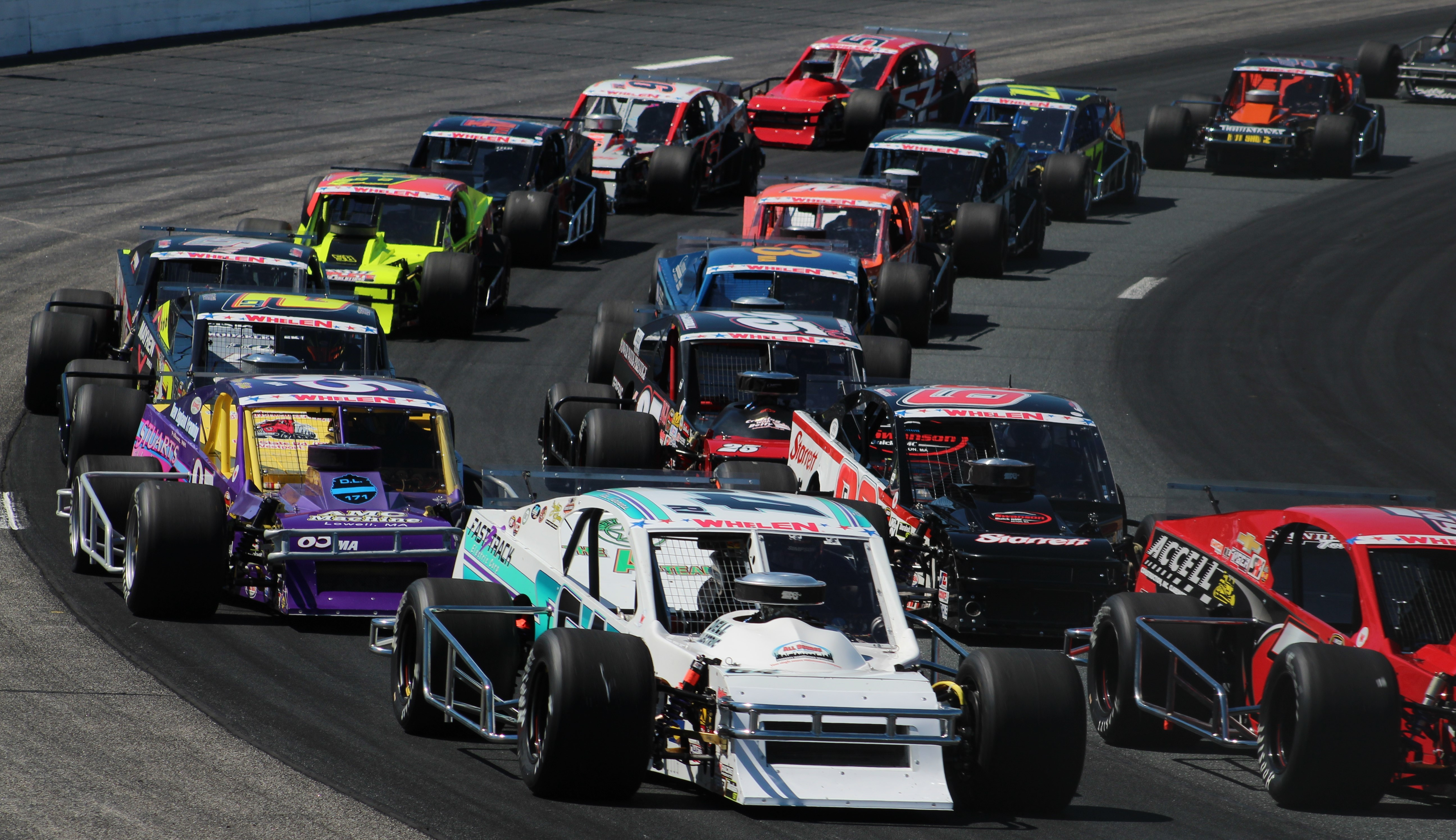
Asphalt modifieds in a race

Modifieds designed solely for asphalt surfaces began appearing in the early 1970s. These modifieds sit on large slick tires that are exposed on all four corners of the car. The roofs of these cars are more rounded than the other types of modifieds, their bodies look somewhat squashed and have large spoilers on the rear of the cars. Drivers sit on the left side of the car, and most of the time will have some type of small plastic windshield in front of them. Asphalt Modifieds are most popular in the Northeast but can be found from Florida to Texas to Michigan under different sanctioning bodies, as well as unsanctioned local classes. The rules packages may vary greatly.

=== Touring Series ===
==== Midwest Modifieds Tour ====
The Midwest Modifieds Tour started in 1989 as the E-Mod Series at Mount Lawn Speedway near Indianapolis. It has undergone several name changes including ICAR, NSTA Top Speed Modified Tour, and the USA Modified Series. This travelling series races at local short tracks in Indiana, Michigan, and Ohio. In 2013 they raced for the first time on a road course, near South Haven, Michigan, at GingerMan Raceway. The series changed hands for 2017, from ICAR to NSTA, after being purchased by John Robbins (nephew of the former ASA pioneers) from Dave Muzillo.

==== NASCAR Whelen Modified Tour ====
The NASCAR Whelen Modified series is the only remaining NASCAR series from the sanctioning body's original season in 1948. The original style of NASCAR modifieds actually pre-dates NASCAR's existence by many years. Though it is now known as an asphalt-oval-only series, this was not always the case. The series originally started on dirt, and as more and more asphalt tracks opened, the series migrated to racing on the newer tracks. The series also had previously made forays into road racing with stops at Watkins Glen International in New York. Drivers like Bobby Allison and Red Farmer started in the NASCAR Modified series, which was popular both in the south and the Northeast. Many NASCAR Sprint Cup drivers have come from this series, including Ryan Preece, Jimmy Spencer, Geoff Bodine and Steve Park.

==== Race of Champions Asphalt Modified Series ====
The Race of Champions Asphalt Modified Series was first developed by Andrew Harpell in 1994 as the New York Modified Series. Harpell subsequently purchased the historic Race of Champions, and rebranded the series upon creation of a separate Dirt Modified Tour in 2005.

==== SMART Modified Tour ====
In late 2004, NASCAR bought out the Southern Modified Auto Racing Teams (SMART), and promptly renamed it the NASCAR Whelen Southern Modified Tour. The southern tour uses exactly the same set of rules as the northern tour, but races primarily in the southeastern section of the US. The majority of races on the southern tour schedule occur before late April and after August as not to interfere with weekly racing at Bowman Gray Stadium. Once per year, the northern tour and the southern tour race at Bristol Motor Speedway, in Bristol, Tennessee. The two tours were permanently merged for the 2016 season. The SMART Tour made an official full time return in 2021.

== Dirt modified ==
=== Northeast dirt modified ===
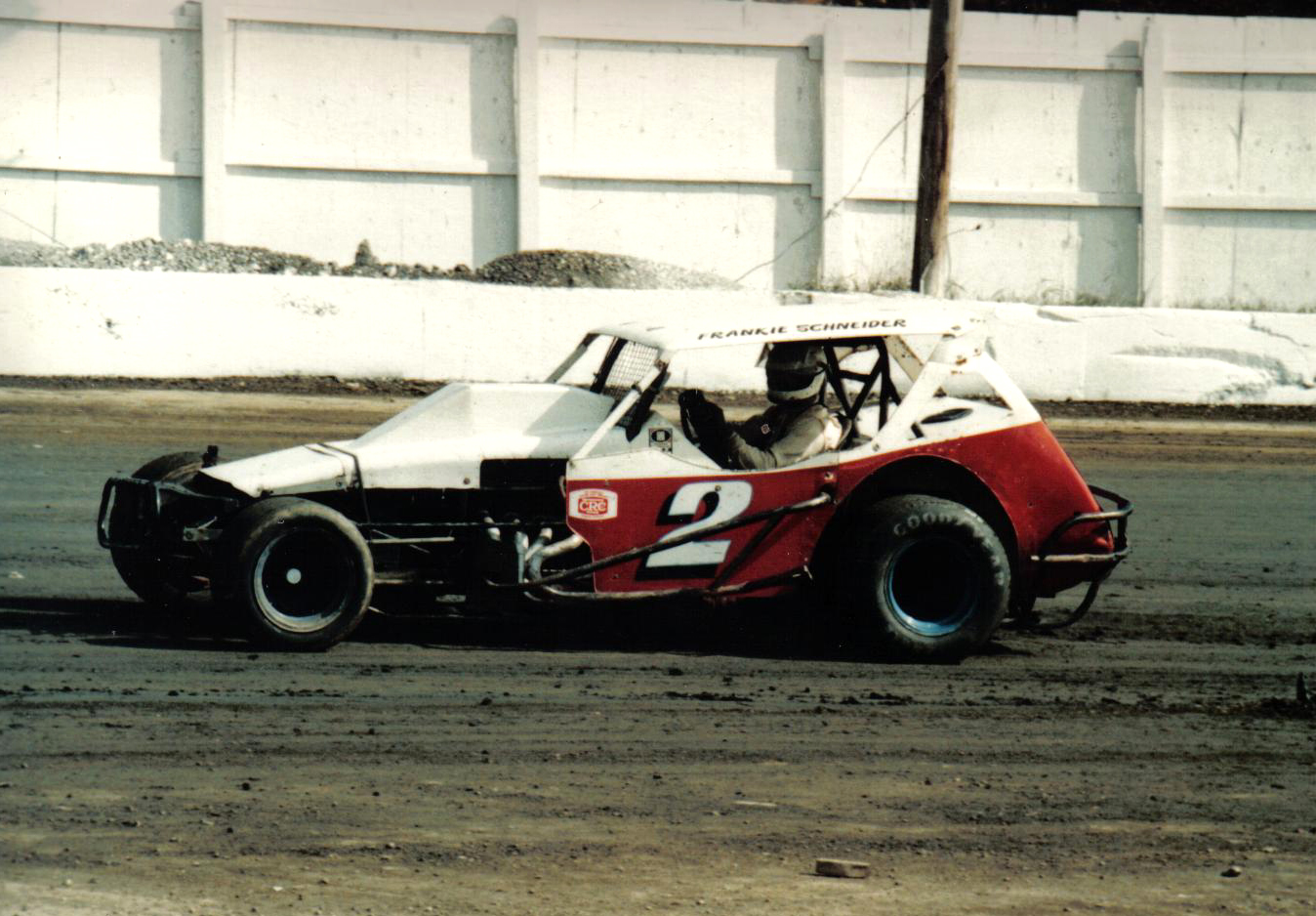
Frankie Schneider's DIRT modified from the early 1980s

The late Dick Tobias from Pennsylvania revolutionized the chassis of the dirt track modified stock car class in the early 1970s by producing an entirely homemade chassis constructed of tubular steel. Race promotors, drivers and car builders who focused on the dirt tracks in northeastern U.S. and southeastern Canada, became eager for standardized rules. In 1976, the Driver's Independent Race Tracks (DIRT) was organized, and rules were implemented where the driver sits in the middle of the car, with high-downforce, wind-channeling tunnels on either side of him. Other promoters and sanctioning bodies in the region adopted similar rules shortly thereafter. The roofs are very flat, and tilted to catch additional air. The front suspension is usually a coil-over setup, with a torsion-bar set-up for the rear suspension. They utilize full tube chassis, which to the untrained eye, looks like a sprint car chassis, but is much different in reality.

==== Big block modifieds ====
Big blocks originate in the era of true Modified Stock Cars. “Jalopies” or today’s Late Models had their noses cut off, lightened, and stuffed with big engines to make what they called Modifieds whether they raced on pavement or dirt. Big blocks were the biggest, most powerful engines of the time. Engines max at 467 cubic inches, with one 4-barrel carburetor, and horsepower ranging from 650 to 800 horsepower.

==== Small block modifieds ====
The small block or "358 modifieds" emerged from NASCAR's Sportsman division, which had been formed in 1950 as NASCAR's short track race division. The sportsman cars were older model cars and could be modified, but not as much as the Modified series cars. By 1967 the limitations had evolved to include small block engines, a single carburetor and pump gasoline. The norm for many NASCAR-sanctioned tracks was that Modifieds and Sportsmen raced side by side, but top-finishing Sportsmen received bonus money, and separate points were tallied for both divisions.

Looking to differentiate the Sportsman as a truly separate class and expecting spectators to relate better to newer model cars, NASCAR dropped the pre-war coupes and sedans for the 1968 season, substituting the Late Model Sportsman Series (later to become the Xfinity Series) with 1955 and newer bodies.

Anchored by tracks like the Orange County Fair Speedway in eastern New York and Mercer Raceway in northern Pennsylvania, non-sanctioned venues in the Northeast continued to run a support class with pre-war and new bodied sportsman combined. Notably the Watertown Speedway in Northern New York had a shared rule book with the Kingston Speedway in Ontario, Canada limiting engines for their primary class to the old Ford flathead V8 and Chevrolet inline 6 cylinders. In 1968, they updated their rules to allow the newer small block engines, attracting the pre-war coupes from Saranac Lake and Fort Covington International Speedways, and the neighboring Evans Mills Speedway opened with similar rules. Propelled by the strong economics of southeastern Canada's metropolitan areas, the nearby Brockville Ontario and Cornwall Motor Speedways soon opened, and the "small blocks" became the premiere class in the St. Lawrence River Valley.

The DIRT organization eventually standardized the engine sizes across its member tracks to 320 cubic inches, and later to 358 cubic inches. In 1983, the Mr. Dirt 320 Modified Championship trail was created, pitting the "St. Lawrence Valley small blocks" against their counterparts in the Hudson Valley and the Twin Tiers regions of Pennsylvania and New York, thus restoring the status of the class throughout the Northeast.

==== Sportsman modifieds ====
Not to be confused with the former NASCAR Sportsman class, in 1987 a new Sportsman Division was created by the DIRT organization to help new and underfunded drivers learn how to work with and drive the same chassis as a modified. Although cars are identical to the naked eye, the sportsman engines are about 500 horsepower compared to the 750-800 horsepower, 467-cubic inch big blocks in the modifieds. The new division increased the gate revenues at the pit window, and created new customers for modified teams to sell their used cars to. It also put more cars on the market in the offseason, lowering prices and allowing both divisions to grow.

Promotors in the northeast have also introduced a Limited Sportsman class. Although there may be some cost saving restrictions on the cars, the primary limitation rests with the experience level of the drivers.

==== Super DIRTcar Series ====
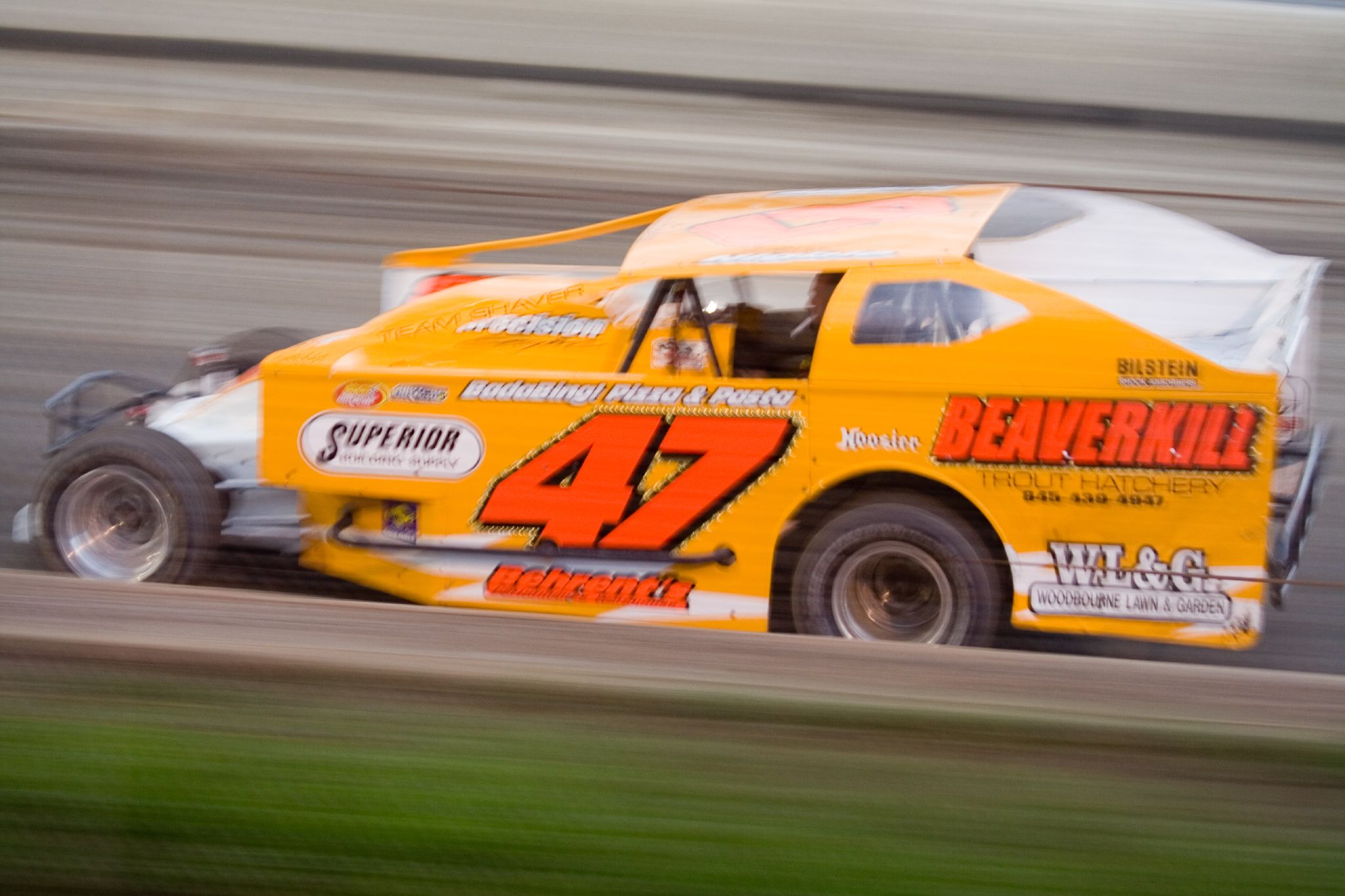
A modern Super DIRTcar Series modified in action

The Driver's Independent Race Tracks (DIRT) was acquired by Boundless Racing in June 2004 which had purchased the World of Outlaws in February of that year. In November 2004, Boundless Racing changed its name to DIRT Motorsports and began doing business as the World Racing Group. In December of the same year, DIRT Motorsports bought Midwestern sanctioning body UMP.

The former DIRT big-block (and small block) modified series has seen many changes in their car designs since the 1970s, but the competition and will to win has remained the same. The ultra-fast, super nimble cars race primarily in the Northeastern United States and Canada, but have had a race added in the Midwest on the 2007 and the 2008 schedules. NASCAR and World of Outlaws Late Model driver Tim McCreadie came from this series, as did World of Outlaws Late Model drivers Tim Fuller and Vic Coffey. All of those drivers still race in the series on a part-time basis, between 10 and 30 times a year. Notable drivers having competed in DIRTcar modifieds include Bobby Allison, Tony Stewart, Andrew Ranger, Dave Blaney, Carl Edwards, J. J. Yeley and David Reutimann.

==== Short Track Super Series ====
Originated in 2013 by Brett Deyo and BD Motorsports Media LLC, the Short Track Super Series expanded by 2022 to 20 different racetracks in New York, Vermont, New Jersey, Delaware, Pennsylvania, Florida and Louisiana. Series rules permit the standard side window bodywork to be replaced with sail panels, and the series mandates a spec American Racer Tire.

The series included both a North and South divisions until 2026, converting to one unified schedule and championship series in 2027. The Delaware based touring series livestreams its events to a national audience.

=== Midwest dirt modified ===
Dirt modifieds at Beaver Dam Raceway, WI

While modified racing remained popular on the east coast, varieties of the "strictly stock" / "late models" became the primary class in other parts of the country. In the late 1970s, the dirt modified was re-introduced in the Midwest as a mid-level class between late models and hobby stocks. One of the most notable differences in the Midwest modified series cars is the use of stock production car frame sections as part of the racing chassis. These cars also race on smaller tires than the other types of modifieds, with most sanctioning bodies specifying the same tire. The Midwest dirt modified bodies are very flat on the sides, and lack the downforce generating tunnels the Northeast dirt modifieds sport. The driver sits on the left side.

The designation "Midwest modifieds" has become a misnomer, as the class is now popular throughout the U.S. and Canada. The class is now more commonly referenced in the context of sanctioning bodies, the three most common being IMCA mods, WISSOTA mods, and DIRTcar UMP mods.

==== IMCA/WISSOTA/UMP Modifieds ====
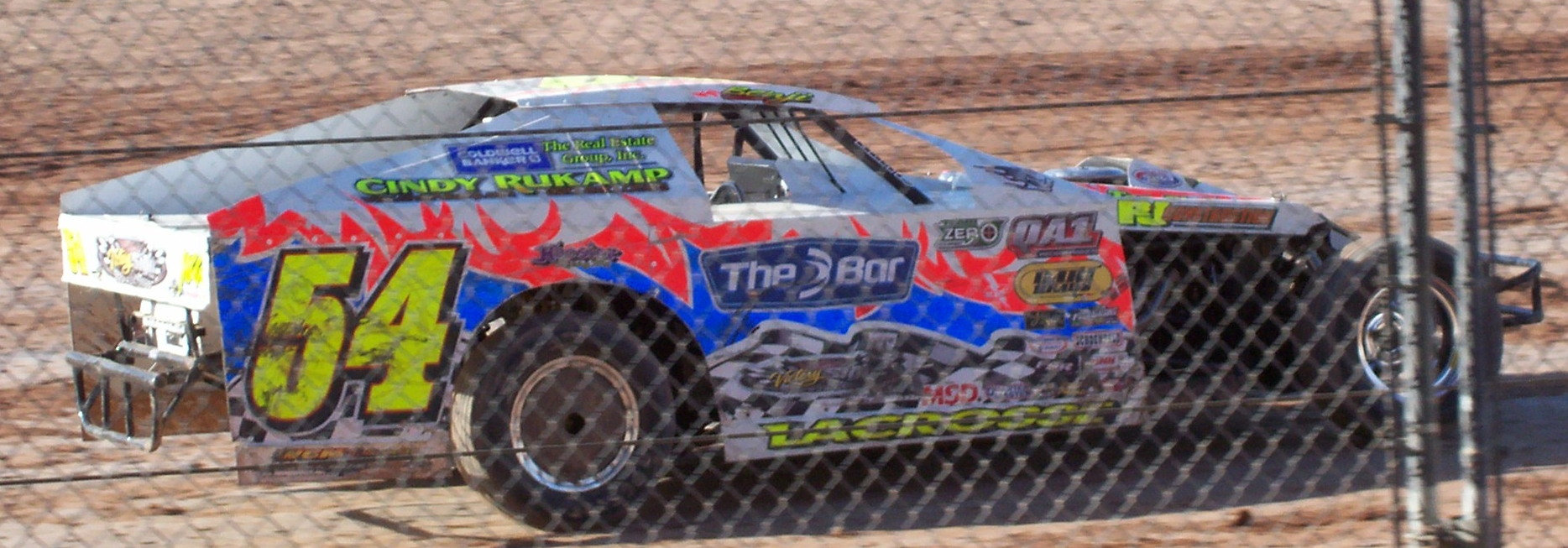
2006 IMCA National Champion Benji LaCrosse's Modified

Organized in 1915, the International Motor Contest Association (IMCA) is the oldest racing sanctioning body in the US. IMCA introduced the "E-Mod" (or Economy Modified) in 1979. It has become one of the most popular dirt racing classes due to its simple design, light-weight, high power, and ability to adapt to varying track conditions easily. Most IMCA-style classes also boast a "claim rule", wherein a racer may buy a competitor's engine for a small amount of money (usually around $500). This rule was intended to keep engine prices from skyrocketing. The IMCA Sportmods appear very similar to their brethren, but have distinctly different engines. The Afco KidModz appear the same as the others, but sport full tube chassis, and by rules, have to have Ford 2300 cc inline 4-cylinder engines.

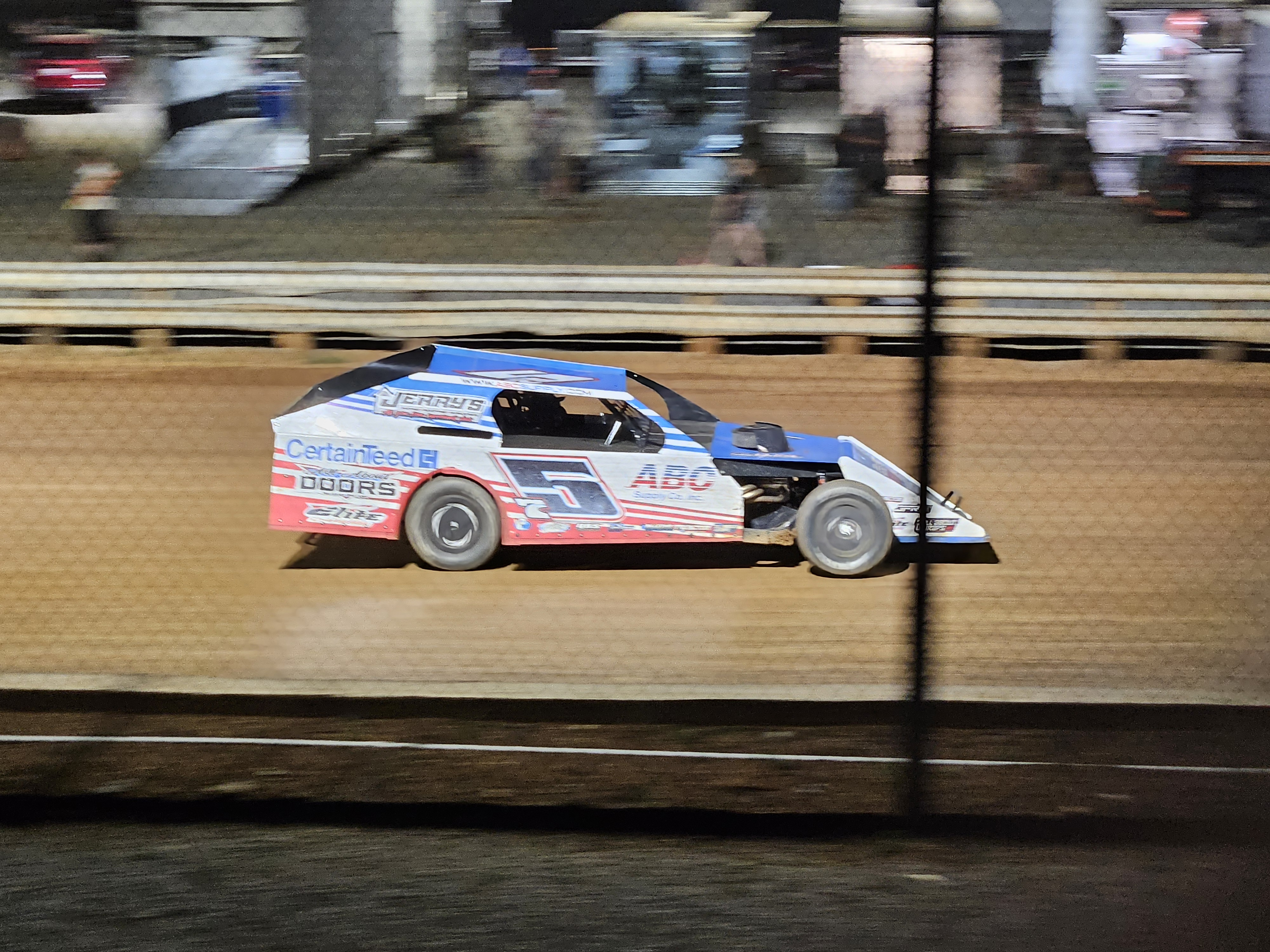
UMP mod, Hagerstown MD

Sanctioning bodies WISSOTA Promoters' Association and DIRTcar UMP (formerly United Midwestern Promoters) also have classes that are almost identical to IMCA's modifieds, with a few small exceptions. The AMRA, or American Motor Racing Association also follows this popular formula for modifieds. NASCAR drivers Ken Schrader and Kenny Wallace own and race UMP Modifieds on off weekends from NASCAR. Some tracks sanction modifieds with IMCA-like specifications, such as Slinger Super Speedway.

==== IMCA SportMods ====
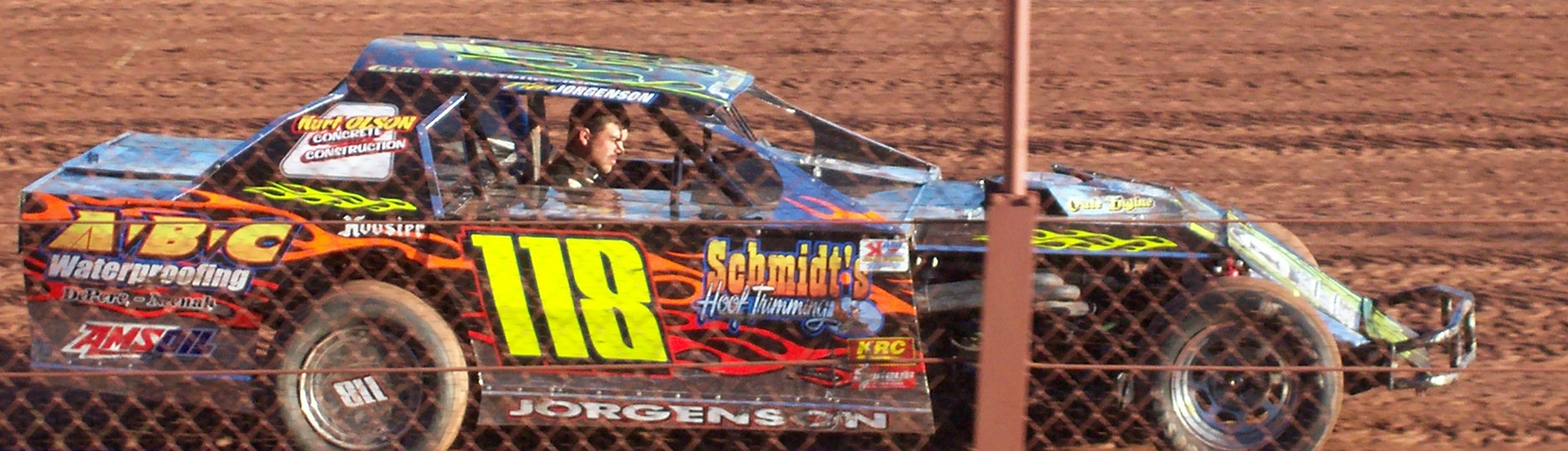
A Northern division IMCA Sport Modified

IMCA designed a new lower-cost class of SportMod cars in 2004 to complement its Modified division. The division is divided into Northern SportMods and Southern SportMods divisions. The Northern SportMods have a few small differences from the Southern SportMods in the body of the car. These cars are somewhat smaller and have less powerful engines. They can be differentiated from IMCA Modifieds because the car has a break in the body that extends from the rear roof to the spoiler at the rear.

==== Afco KidModz ====
This relatively inexpensive (when compared to their "adult" counterparts) racing series is aimed at attracting younger drivers as an entry-level class. It closely follows UMP's Modified rules, with a few exceptions. The engine must be a 2300cc Ford Pinto (also known as a Lima) inline 4-cylinder, and the drivers can be no younger than 12, nor older than 18. Some tracks will allow children aged 10 or 11 to race if the track's insurance will allow. The KidModz are also allowed to run tubular chassis, whereas the IMCA/WISSOTA/UMP Modifieds have to have sections of frames from stock production automobiles, with other sections being steel tubing. These cars are offered for sale completely assembled and ready-to-race for under $20,000. The unassembled price is lower.

== Outlaw Modifieds ==
=== GLOM ===
Found in the Midwestern United States, the Great Lakes Outlaw Modifieds (GLOM) are a cross between IMCA Modifieds and UMP Late Models. These cars have nearly the same hand-made aluminum bodies as their UMP Late Model counterparts (without front fenders), have tubular chassis and sport unrestricted engines with aluminum engine blocks and heads. They also are allowed to utilize quick-change rear ends and aluminum wheels, whereas the IMCA modifieds are forced to race with heavier cast-iron engines, partial stock frames, steel wheels and Ford 9-inch (230 mm) rear ends.

=== Ark-La-Tex ===
Outlaw modified racing in the Ark-La-Tex region originated at Boothill Speedway in Greenwood, Louisiana, and soon spread throughout the area. When Heart O' Texas Speedway in Waco began hosting outlaw modified races, drivers in the region could run at Waco on Friday nights and at Boothill on Saturday nights. The Ark-La-Tex Wing Modified Association and Texas Wing Modified Association were both organized in 2004.

Ark-La-Tex Wing Modifieds sport full tube chassis and bodies that look like the Advanced Auto Parts Super DIRTcar racers, with the addition of a sprint car-like wing affixed to the roof. Some cars use different, so-called "skinny bodies" which are not currently being made. Both types of cars could also be found deeper into Texas, such as Dallas.

National Sprint Car Hall of Fame inductee Gary Wright raced open wheel modified "skinny cars" early in his racing career, starting in 1977.

=== AOMRA ===
One type of outlaw modified in Alberta, Canada, races on both dirt and asphalt, with the same cars. Started in the mid-1980s, the Alberta Outlaw Modified Racing Association (AOMRA) races in Alberta, British Columbia, and Saskatchewan. They look like a cross between IMCA modifieds and old NASCAR modifieds.

=== Outlaw Modified Racing Series ===
Organized in Florida in the 1970s, these Outlaw Modifieds are fairly unusual. They are built on tube chassis with coil over shocks. 10-inch-wide (250 mm) tires and a 76-inch (1,900 mm) track make these cars are fast and nimble. 2300 cc, four-cylinder power plants from Fords, Toyotas and even an odd Nissan are common, but the Ford Pinto Lima is the favored motor. Motor rules have stayed very stable over the last ten years with the only rule change coming in 2008 which allowed the Esslinger aluminum d-port head, due to the declining availability of the cast-iron cylinder heads. These cars are set apart from most modified racing series in that they do not utilize roofs on the cars.

== Scale cars ==
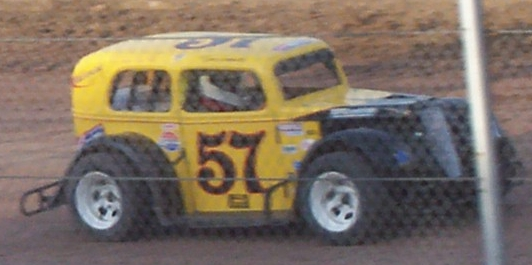
A Legends race car

=== Legends car racing ===
US Legend Cars International of Charlotte, North Carolina, created the Legends series (while they were named 600 Motorsports) as a way of attracting more and younger people into racing with affordable cars. The cars were designed to be 5/8-scale 1930s and 1940s coupes and sedans cars raced in the past in the NASCAR Whelen Modified Tour. They all have a tube chassis and spec 1250 cc Yamaha Motorcycle engines.

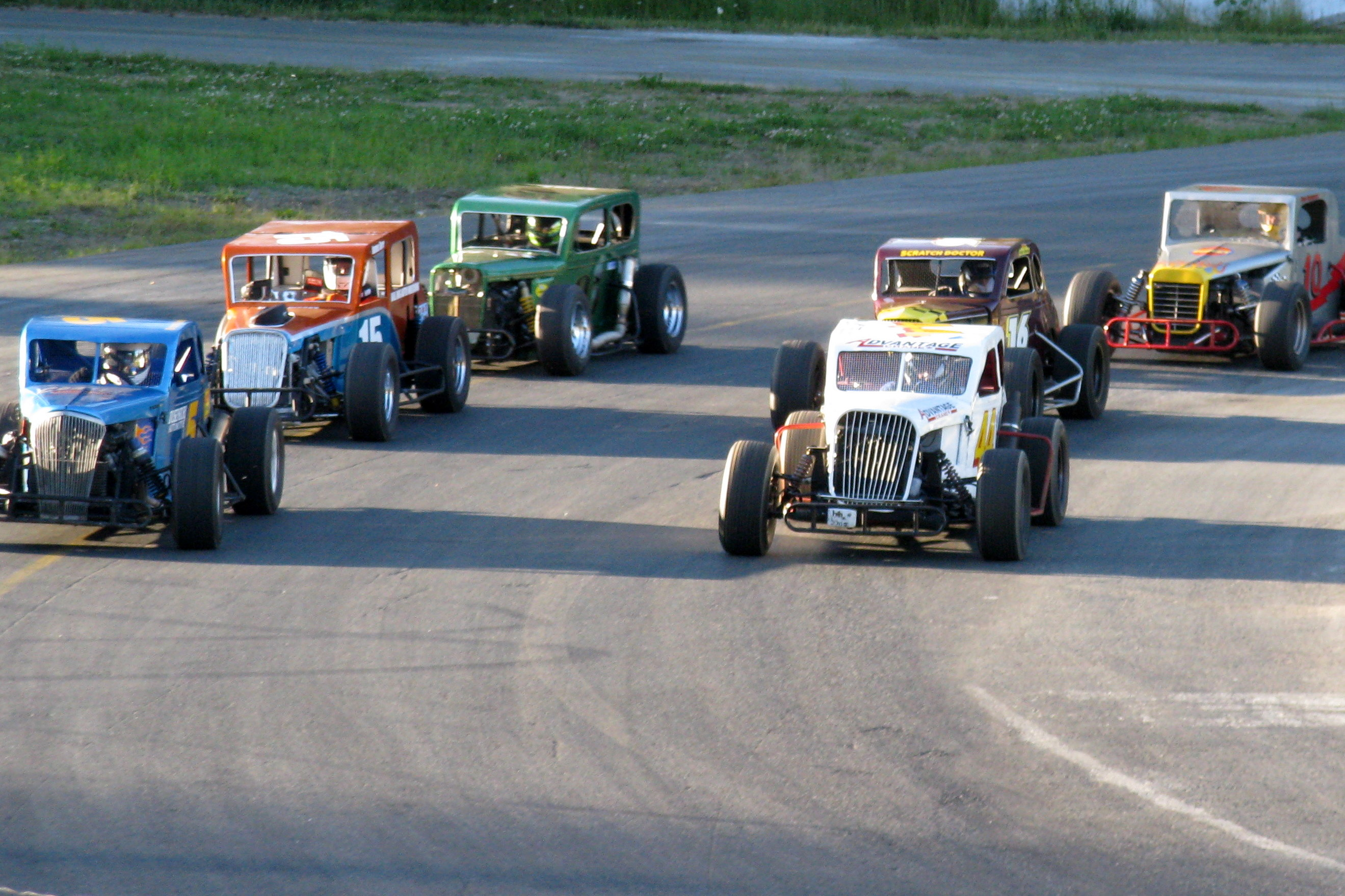
Dwarf cars in 2008

=== Dwarf cars ===
Dwarf cars are similar to the Legends cars, in that they are scale replicas of vintage race cars. The similarity ends there, as Dwarf cars are true open "modified-style" cars without fenders, and have a 1,250 cc (76 cu in) limitation on the engine size. The Western States Dwarf Car Association, begun in 1993, has become one of the most successful racing organizations, boasting an average of 80–100 Dwarf Cars at 4 National, and several regional, events a year.

There is also a class of Dwarf Cars that race on dirt called the Vintage Lite Series. They race a mixed field of cars, some resembling the vintage cars and some scaled-down versions of the current modified dirt cars (these cars are often referred to as the MiniMods).

=== Mod Lite ===
The Mod Lite is a 5/8th scale race car that resembles the northeast dirt modifieds, but is powered by a 190-200hp 1,000cc stock 16-valve motorcycle engine. Most racers use the Suzuki GSX-R1000 or Kawasaki ZX-10.

=== Slingshot ===
The Slingshot is a four-coil vehicle with a 58-inch wheelbase, designed to look like a northeast dirt modified and powered by a Briggs & Stratton Vanguard engine capable of speeds near 100 MPH.
