= Butch Jelley =

American racing driver (born 1940)

- Born: Clarence Jelley; July 2, 1940 Rockville, Connecticut, U.S.
- Died: May 1, 2020 (aged 79)

Modified racing career
- Debut season: 1957
- Championships: 1
- Finished last season: 2005

Clarence "Butch" Jelley (July 2, 1940 – May 1, 2020) was an American dirt modified racing driver. Known for driving car number "Y" with a cartoon character devil painted on the side, and later car number "X" featuring a skunk mascot, he was always a favorite of the younger race fans.

== Racing career ==
Jelley began racing jalopies at the Claremont Speedway in New Hampshire in 1957. By 1960, he was racing modifieds, claiming the Lebanon Valley Speedway rookie of the year award, and going on to win 31 feature events at the West Lebanon, New York, track over his career.

During his career, Jelley competed successfully at the renowned tracks of the northeast, including New York's Albany-Saratoga Speedway in Malta, Fonda Speedway, Mid-State Speedway in Morris, and Syracuse Mile, as well as Langhorne Speedway, Pennsylvania. He was the 1975 track champion at Devil's Bowl Speedway in West Haven, Vermont.

Jelley was inducted into the Northeast Dirt Modified and the New York State Stock Car Association Halls of Fame.
