= Mert Hulbert =

Retired American racing driver (born 1937)

- Born: Meredith S. Hulbert; September 21, 1937 (age 89)
- Retired: 1980

Modified racing career
- Debut season: 1965
- Car number: 1, 2h, 8, 23
- Championships: 2

Meredith Hulbert (born September 21, 1937) is a retired driver of dirt modified stock cars. The inaugural Devil's Bowl Speedway (West Haven, Vermont) track champion, Hulbert earned the nickname "socks" because he often raced in his stocking feet.

== Racing career ==
Hulbert competed regularly in New York's Capital Region, including Albany-Saratoga Speedway in Malta, the Cairo Fairgrounds, and Mid-State Speedway in Morris, while picking up the 1978 track championship at Lebanon Valley Speedway. He was also successful at venues throughout the state, such as Orange County Fair Speedway in Middletown, Ransomville Speedway, Rolling Wheels Raceway in Elbridge, and the Syracuse Mile.

Hulbert was inducted into the New York State Stock Car Association Hall of Fame in 1990 and the Northeast Dirt Modified Hall of Fame in 2003.
