= Tommy Corellis =

American Dirt Modified racing driver (born 1941)

- Born: Thomas A. Corellis; August 18, 1941 (age 85)
- Debut season: 1955

Modified racing career
- Car number: 1, 28, 50, 57, 63, 72
- Championships: 8
- Finished last season: 1996

Thomas A. Corellis (born August 18, 1941) is a retired American Dirt Modified racing driver. Corellis captured 8 track championships at the Lebanon Valley Speedway (New York) during his career, including five consecutive titles from 1971 to 1975.

== Racing career ==
Corellis started racing at the age of 14 at Lebanon Valley, but promptly got expelled. He returned a few years later and became a dominant racer, ultimately winning 83 feature events at the venue. Corellis also competed regularly at the Devil's Bowl Speedway in West Haven, Vermont, and the Albany-Saratoga and Orange County Fair Speedways in New York. He captured both the 1986 and 1987 Independence Day events at the Syracuse New York Mile.

After surgery to remove a brain aneurism in 1989, Corellis made multiple return visits to victory lane before permanently handing the keys to his son Donnie in 1996. He was inducted into the Northeast Dirt Modified and the New York State Stock Car Association Halls of Fame.
