= Saratoga Automobile Museum =

Automotive Museum, Saratoga Springs, New York

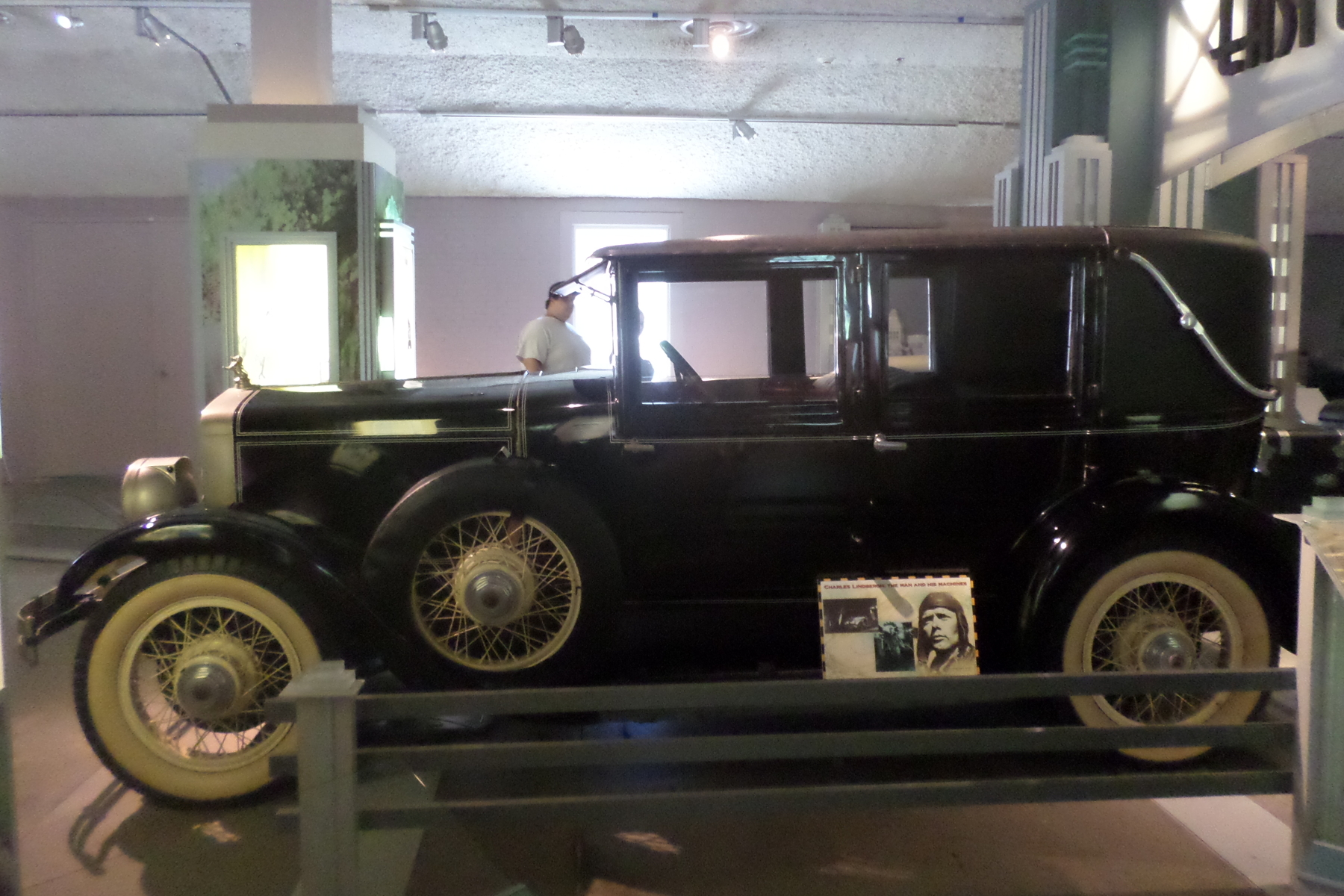
- 1928 Franklin Airman Series 12 Sport Sedan formerly owned by Charles Lindbergh at the Saratoga Automobile Museum

- Location within New York
- Established: 1999
- Location: 110 Avenue of the Pines Saratoga Springs, New York, USA
- Coordinates: 43.057015°N 73.804660°W
- Type: Automotive museum
- Website: Official website

The Saratoga Automobile Museum is located in the 2,379-acre (963 ha) Saratoga Spa State Park in Saratoga Springs, New York. Housed in a former water bottling plant built in 1935, the museum is chartered by the Board of Regents of the State of New York Department of Education as a 501(c) 3 not-for-profit institution and focuses on the impact of the automobile in the past, present and future in New York and the wider world. The Museum is also a member of the American Alliance of Museums (AAM).

== Facilities ==
After a full renovation, the Saratoga Automobile Museum was chartered in 1999 and officially opened to the public in June 2002 (24 years ago). It can display approximately thirty vehicles between three galleries on two floors. The ground floor displays rotating featured exhibits between two galleries. Gallery A is an expansive space featuring 30+ foot ceilings, original tile walls and flooring, and the focal point of the gallery, 3 floor-to-ceiling palladian windows and observation walkway. This gallery is often used for public and private events and weddings. Also on the first floor is a small theater room.

== Collections ==
An art gallery showcases local and international artists and photographers. The second floor houses the two permanent exhibits overlooking the first floor, Racing in New York and East of Detroit, plus the New York State Stock Car Association Hall of Fame.

=== NYSSCA Hall of Fame Inductees ===
==== Class of 1984 to Class of 2009 ====
1984	Steve Danish, Jeep Herbert, Kenny Shoemaker
1985	Pete Corey, Paul Marshall
1986	George Proctor, Tony Villano
1987	Doug Garrison, Irv Taylor, Jerry Townley
1988	Eddie Flemke, Frank Trinkaus, Bill Wimble
1989	Rene Charland, Cliff Kotary, Theron Moore, Ted Ryan, Ken Tremont Sr.
1990	Ernie Gahan, Mert Hulbert, Dick Nephew, Karl Haeussel
1991	Nick Ronca, "Tate" Eugene Tetreault, Howie Westervelt
1992	"Jollie" Ollie Palmer, Donald Wayman, Cliff Wright
1993	Jerry Cook, Ralph Ouderkirk, Frankie Schneider
1994	Tim Baker, Ed Delmolino, Chuck Ely, Ed Pieniazek
1995	Chet Hames, Hugh Hedger, Claude Hoard, Ron Narducci
1996	Fred DeCarr, Dexter Dorr, Ernie Marshall, Ernie Martin
1997	Dick Clark, Mike Ehring, Richie Evans, George Janoski, Lou Spanier, Bugsy Stevens
1998	Margaret Bosley, Leonard Bosley, Carlton Hughes, Harry Peek, Winn Slavin
1999	Tommy Corellis, C. D. Coville, Stretch VanSteenburgh, Don MacTavish
2000	Ken Goodermote, Lou Lazzaro, Link Pettit, Sr., Ethel Searing-Wetmore
2001	John Button, Ray Dalmata, Ed Feuz, James Gage Sr., Bob Hackel, Dutch Hoag, Charles "Chuck" Irving, Charlie LaDuc, Jim Luke, Steve Luse, Bernie Miller, Bob Mott, John Osterhoudt, Lee Palmer, Vince Quenneville Sr., C.J. Richards, Paul Roberts, Allen "Schootch" Schoonmaker, Sonny Seamon, Arthur "Uncle” Art Stuarts, George Welch, Stan Wetmore
2002	George Marcus, John "Jocko" Martterer, Bob Whitebeck
2003	Len Boehler, Fred DeSarro, Maynard Forrette, Butch Jelley, Andy Romano
2004	John Grady, Buck Holliday, Brian Ross, Donnie Wetmore
2005	Geoff Bodine, Ed Cloce, Jim Frye, Barb Frye, Dick Schoonover
2006	Chuck Akulis, Jim Langenback, John Tallini, Merv Treichler
2007	Art Barry, Les Deuel, Bob McCreadie, Buzzie Reutimann, Maynard Troyer
2008	Will Cagle, Dick Hansen, Billy Rafter, Dick Waterman
2009	Jerry Higbie Sr., Mike Romano, Charlie Rudolph, Jimmy Spencer

==== Class of 2010 to Present ====
2010	Marty Beberwyk, Hertha Beberwyk, Jack Cottrell, Paul Emerick, Dickie Larkin
2011	Don Ackner, Mike Budka, Dave Lape, Walt Mitchell, Rich Ricci, Sr., Jim Shampine
2012	Percy Barber, Peg Bedell, Walter Bedell, Jack Blackwood Jr., Bill Brooking, Dave Cruickshank, Bob Devine, Don Diffendorf, Glenn Donnelly, Gibby Fountain, Don Haddock, Ron Hedger, Jack Johnson, Milt Johnson, George Kent, Walt Markert, Kenny Marshall, Edmund Pierce, Mike Ronca, Dick Sweet, Danny Watson, Tommy Williams Sr.
2013	Mike Colsten, Jimmy King, Joe Messina, Bob Savoie, Jimmy Winks
2014	Pete Bicknell, Kenny Brightbill, Howie Commander, Charlie Jarzombek, Marcia Wetmore
2015	Bruce Dostal, Richie Eurich, Claude and Gail Riley, Doug Hoffman, Norm Moyer, Billy Taylor
2016	Gary Balough, Don and Jo Ann Davies, Bill Greco, Paul Jensen, Danny Odyda
2017	Dick Hicks, Jimmy Horton, Dave Kneisel, Allie Swears
2018	Gary Iulg, Jerry Rose, Curt Van Pelt, Pat Ward
2019	Jeff Heotzler, Charlie Langenstein, John McArdell, Mike McLaughlin
2020/21	Gene Cole, John C Flach, John P Flach, JoAnn Flanigan, Brett Hearn, Randy Ross, Roger Treichler
2022	Ray Bramall, Ralph Compani, Frank “Sege” Fidanza, Steve Hartman Sr., Roger Heroux, John Keegan, Don Lawson Sr., Herbie Layfield, Roger Phelps, Gary Smith, Kenny Tremont Jr., Herbert Wright
2023	Mitch Gibbs, Dale Planck, Joe Plazek
2024	Brian Bedell, Margaret Ann Bedell, Jay Castimore, Billy Decker, Steve Paine, Jim “Rocky” Rothwell
2025	Alan Johnson, Danny Johnson, Billy VanPelt, Dan Martin, Don Ronca, Doug Rundel, John Stanley

== Gallery ==
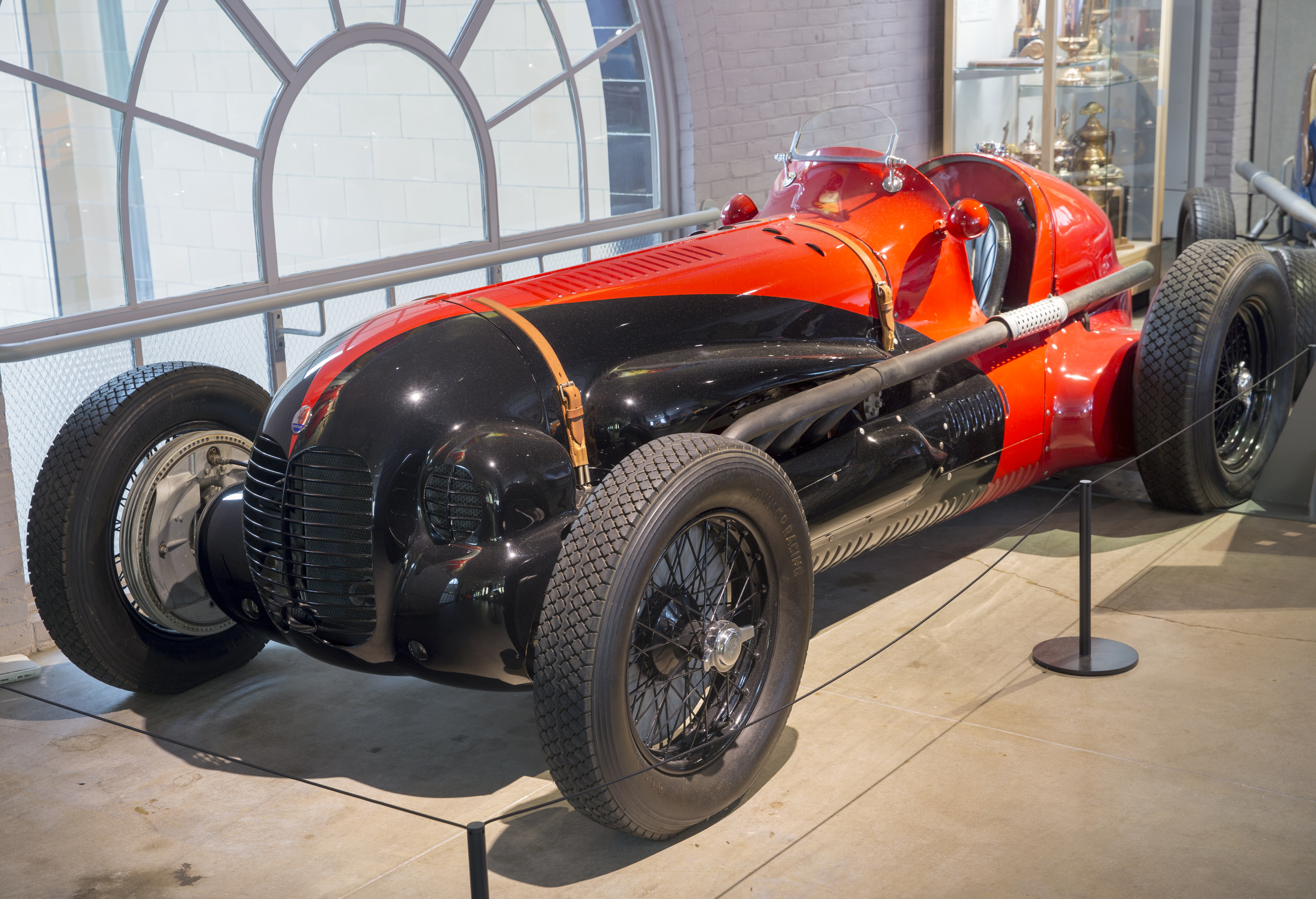
1935 Maserati V8-RI "Poison Lil"

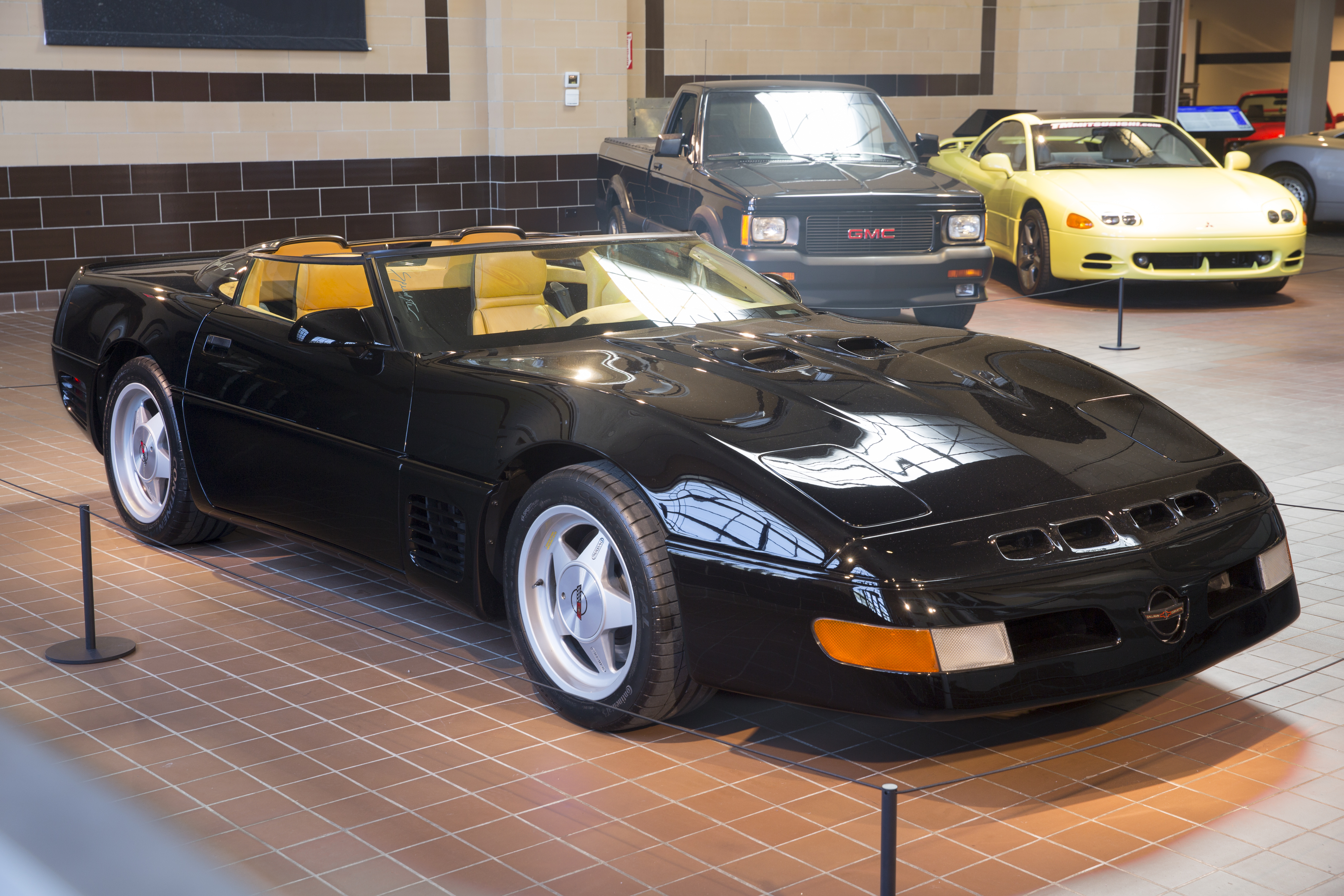
1991 Callaway Corvette Twin Turbo Speedster

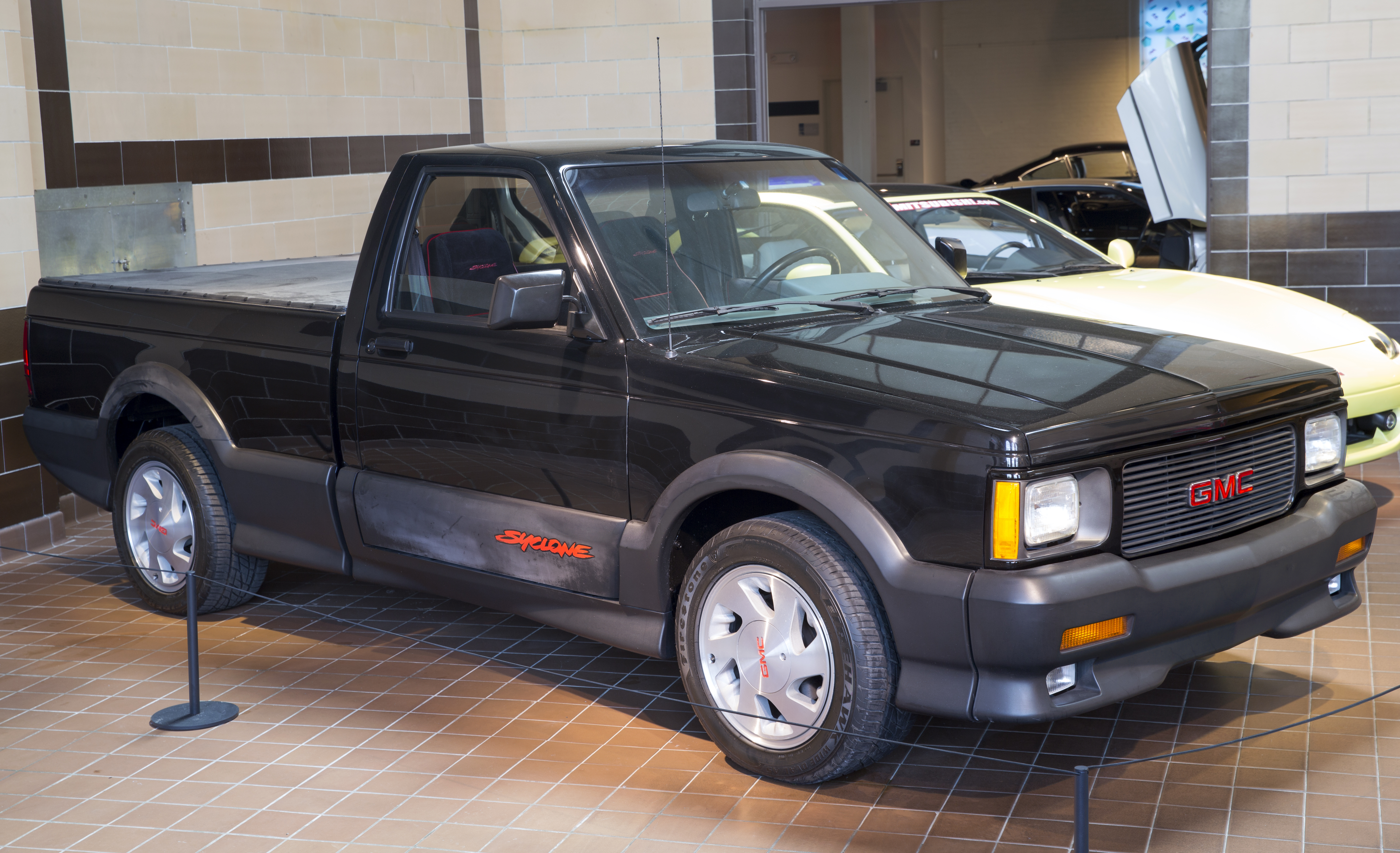
1991 GMC Syclone

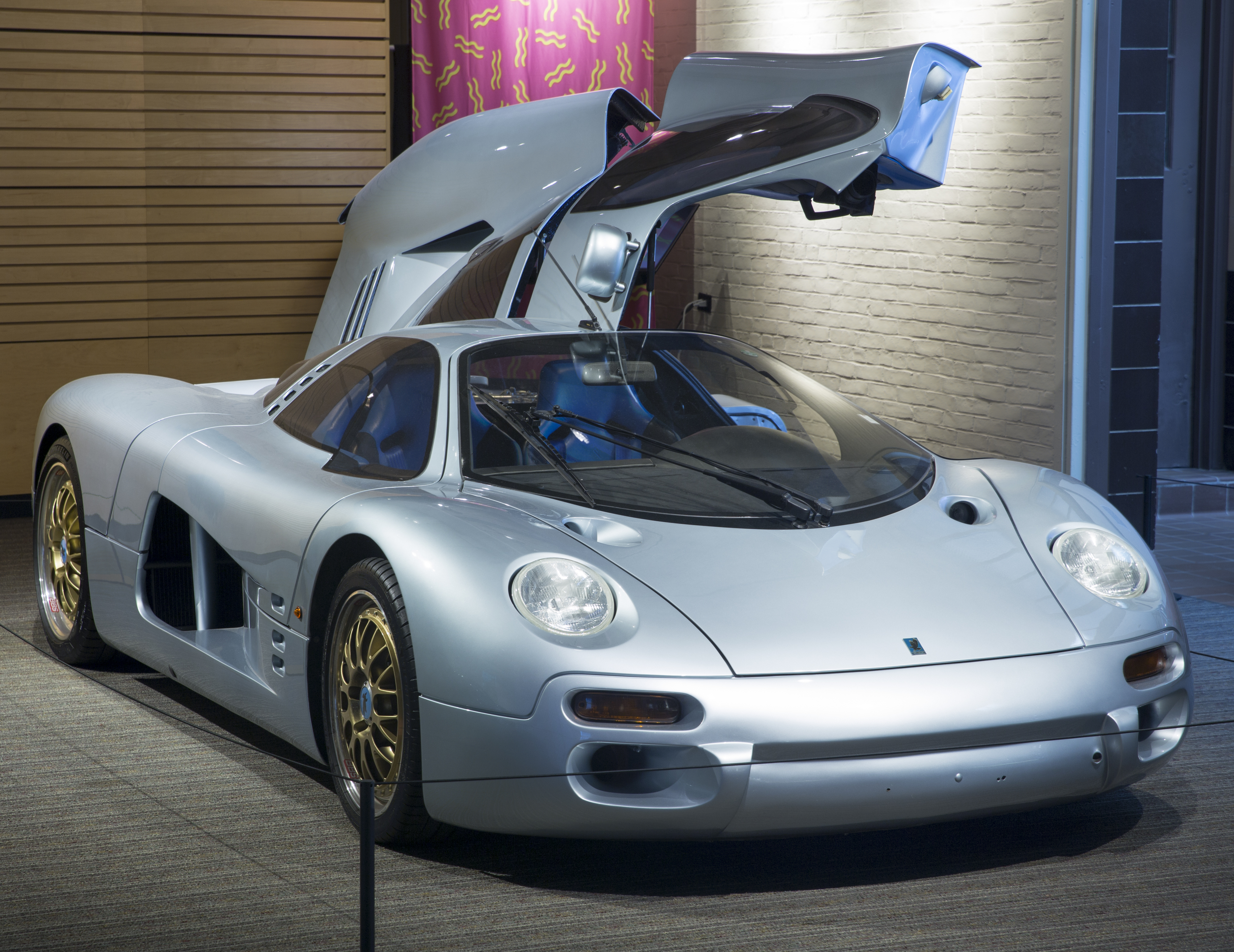
1993 Isdera Commendatore 112i
