= Frank André =

Canadian Dirt Modified racing driver (1927 – 1999)

- Born: Francis J. André; April 24, 1927 Windsor, Ontario, Canada
- Died: March 8, 1999 (aged 71)

Modified racing career
- Debut season: 1949
- Car number: ^{The} X _{Car}
- Championships: 2
- Finished last season: 1972

Francis André (April 24, 1927 – March 8, 1999) was a Canadian dirt modified racing driver whose career spanned two countries and four decades. In an era when trophies were only awarded for championships and special events, André collected over 70.

== Racing career ==
Frank André won his first race at the Shannoville Speedway (Ontario) in 1949. He was routinely victorious at race venues on either side of the St. Lawrence River, including the Beamishill Speedway near Gatineau Quebec, Kingston Speedway in Ontario, and the Edgewood and Evans Mills Speedways in New York. He claimed the Watertown Speedway (New York) track championship in 1963 and 1965.

André's final win, came in 1972 at the Brewerton Speedway (New York), where he came from the back of the starting grid to take the checkered flag. In April 1992, he was the only Canadian among the charter members of the Northeast Dirt Modified Hall of Fame, where his famous X car is on permanent display.
