= C. D. Coville =

American Dirt Modified racing driver (born 1949)

- Born: Clarence D. Coville; October 9, 1949 (age 77) Scotia, New York, U.S.
- Retired: 1996

Modified racing career
- Debut season: 1972
- Car number: 11, 22, 28, 44, 61, 64
- Wins: 150

Clarence "C. D." Coville (born October 9, 1949) is an American retired Dirt Modified racing driver. Often controversial for his aggressive and fearless driving style, he is credited with 150 career wins, including one Sprint car event.

== Racing career ==
For the first six years of his career, Coville had barely been able to qualify for feature events. His breakout year was 1978 when he became a multiple winner and a consistent top runner at several of the Northeast's toughest venues, including New York speedways Albany-Saratoga in Malta, Fonda, Orange County Fair in Middletown, and the Syracuse Mile; East Windsor Speedway in New Jersey; and Nazareth Speedway and Reading Fairgrounds Speedway in Pennsylvania. Coville captured the 1979, 1982, and 1995 track championships at Devil's Bowl Speedway, West Haven, Vermont.

Coville was forced to give up racing in 1996 because of a health issue. He was inducted into the Eastern Motorsports Press Association, the New York State Stock Car Association, and the Northeast Dirt Modified Halls of fame.
