= Guy Robinson (racing driver) =

American racing driver (1939–2024)

- Born: Guy S. Robinson; May 14, 1939 Watertown, New York, U.S.
- Died: September 12, 2024 (aged 85)
- Retired: 1984
- Debut season: 1965

Modified racing career
- Car number: 13
- Championships: 2
- Wins: 100+

Guy "Shorty" Robinson (May 14, 1939 – September 12, 2024) was an American driver of modified stock cars. Equally adept on both dirt and asphalt surfaces, he was victorious at venues on both the American and Canadian sides of the St. Lawrence River, despite being limited primarily to weekend racing by his full-time job.

== Racing career ==
Robinson got his big break in 1965 when owner/driver John Barker Sr. offered him a chance to get behind the wheel of his flathead powered number 122 at the Watertown Speedway, New York. The combination garnered several wins over the following two years. Barker built a new car for the 1967 season, with the new number '13' which became Robinson's hallmark throughout much of his career.

Robinson went on to compete successfully in New York at Brewerton Speedway, Evans Mills Speedway, Fort Covington Speedway, Can-Am Speedway in LaFargeville, and Utica-Rome Speedway in Vernon; and in Ontario at Brockville Speedway, Capital City Speedway in Ottawa, and Kingston Speedway.

Robinson claimed the Watertown Speedway point championships in 1971 and 1973, and he was inducted into the Northeast Dirt Modified Hall of Fame in 1993.

== Personal life ==
Robinson started school in a one-room schoolhouse, walking two miles each way. He was a member of Teamsters Local No. 687 and had a 37-year career as a long-distance tractor trailer drive. Robinson died on September 12, 2024, at the age of 85.
