= Chubby LeRoux =

American racing driver (born 1933)

- Born: Wilfred J. LeRoux; October 10, 1933 Star Lake, New York, US
- Died: May 29, 2020 (aged 86)
- Debut season: 1955

Modified racing career
- Car number: 6-50, 6-12
- Championships: 6
- Finished last season: 1977

Wilfred "Chubby" LeRoux (October 10, 1933 – May 29, 2020) was a pioneering American driver of modified stock cars. Equally adept on both dirt and asphalt surfaces, he competed regularly in the northeastern United States and the southeastern Canada, capturing six track titles.

== Racing career ==
LeRoux began racing in 1955 at various tracks in the Champlain Valley region. In northeastern New York, he became a track regular at Canton Speedway and later Fort Covington International Speedway in his number 6-12 white and red coupe. LeRoux added the NASCAR sanctioned Saranac Lake Speedway when it opened in 1959.

An eye injury prompted LeRoux to limit his driving and to form a partnership with fellow driver Gaston Desmarais in 1965 and 1966, and the merger included a number change to the legendary 6-50. LeRoux returned to driving in 1967, and then the closing of Saranac Lake sent LeRoux looking for new racing venues in 1968. LeRoux found the clay surfaced Watertown Speedway, New York, and claimed the track championship that first year.

LeRoux claimed five more track championships at New York venues over the next seven years, adding one at Brewerton Speedway, a second at Watertown, and three in a row at the asphalt surfaced Evans Mills Speedway.
