= Neal Tooley =

American racing driver (1935–2021)

- Born: June 24, 1935 LeRay, New York, U.S.
- Died: February 27, 2021 (aged 85) Evans Mills, New York, U.S.
- Debut season: 1958

Modified career
- Car number: 17, x37, 120
- Championships: 1

Previous series
- 1966-1971: Supermodified racing

Neal Tooley (June 24, 1935 – February 27, 2021) was an American driver of modified and supermodified race cars. For many years he held the lap record at Trenton Speedway in New Jersey.

== Racing career ==
Tooley began racing a former Don June stock car in 1958, but did not win his first of 28 career features at the Watertown Speedway, New York, until late into the 1962 season. Tooley won the track championship in 1964, and then in 1966 he transitioned to supermodified cars racing primarily at Oswego Speedway, New York.

By 1971, Tooley had returned primarily to modified racing, and went on to compete successfully at venues on both the Canadian and American sides of the St. Lawrence River, including the Capital City Speedway in Ottawa, Ontario, and in New York at Can-Am Speedway in LaFargeville, Fulton Speedway, Evans Mills Speedway, and Spencer Speedway in Williamson. In 1971, he was able to escape serious injury in a fiery crash during the New York State Fair championship at the Syracuse Mile when a pipe penetrated his seat.
