= Kenny Tremont Jr. =

American Dirt Modified racing driver (born 1961)

Kenny Tremont, Jr.
- Born: Kenneth Tremont, Jr. November 13, 1961 (age 64) West Sand Lake, New York
- Retired: 2023
- Debut season: 1979 Devil's Bowl Speedway

Modified racing career
- Car number: 115
- Championships: 41
- Wins: 375+

Championship titles
- 1987 New York State Fair Champion; 2017, 2018 NASCAR Vermont State Champion

Awards
- 2000 EMPA North East Driver of the Year
- Statistics up to date as of September 12, 2024.

Kenneth Tremont Jr. (born November 13, 1961) is an American dirt modified racing driver. He has captured 41 track titles at seven different tracks, and notched wins at 20 different tracks.

== Racing career ==
Tremont began his driving career in 1979 by winning Rookie of the Year honors as a teenager at Devil's Bowl Speedway in West Haven, Vermont, and ultimately won ten track championships. He has since competed and been victorious at the renowned New York racetracks including Airborne Speedway in Plattsburgh, Albany-Saratoga Speedway in Malta, Fonda Speedway, Lebanon Valley Speedway, Utica-Rome Speedway in Vernon, and Weedsport Speedway.

Tremont captured the 1999 Super Dirt Week 300 on the Syracuse Mile and won the companion 358 modified title in 1986, 1992, 1996 and 1997. He was inducted into the Northeast Dirt Modified Hall of Fame in 2018, the New England Auto Racers Hall of Fame in 2022, and into the New York State Stock Car Association Hall of Fame in 2023.
