= Jeff Heotzler =

American Dirt Modified racing driver (born 1957)

- Born: Jeffrey Heotzler; October 22, 1957 (age 69) Wallkill, New York

Modified racing career
- Debut season: 1978
- Car number: J 17
- Championships: 11
- Wins: 150+
- Finished last season: 2021

Championship titles
- 1984 Mr. Dirt 358 Modified Champion
- Statistics up to date as of July 9, 2025.

Jeffrey Heotzler (October 22, 1957) is an American dirt modified racing driver, currently credited with over 150 career wins at 13 tracks from Florida to Quebec.

== Racing career ==
Heotzler began his racing career in 1978 in his brother Ralph's backup car at Orange County Fair Speedway. He has since garnered 11 track championships and one Mr. DIRTcar 358 series championship, competing successfully at Volusia Speedway Park in Florida, as well as New York's Accord Speedway, Albany-Saratoga Speedway in Malta, Lebanon Valley Speedway, Rolling Wheels Raceway in Elbridge, and the Syracuse Mile.

Heotzler was inducted into the New York State Stock Car Association Hall of Fame in 2020, and the Northeast Dirt Modified Hall of Fame in 2016.
