= Harry Peek =

American Dirt Modified racing driver (1945-1998)

- Born: Harold W. Peek Jr. April 12, 1945 Schenectady, New York
- Died: February 5, 1998 (aged 52)
- Retired: 1997
- Debut season: 1966

Modified racing career
- Years active: 1971-1997
- Car number: 27
- Championships: 4

Previous series
- 1968-1970 Championships 1966-1967: Late model 1 Hobby stock

Harold W. Peek Jr. (April 12, 1945 – February 5, 1998) was an American stock car driver. Track announcers coined his driving style as the "Patented Peek Charge", as he would wait until the end of the race to make his move to victory.

== Racing career ==
Peek began racing in the support division at Lebanon Valley Speedway (West Lebanon, New York) in 1966. He moved to late model division at Fonda Speedway (New York) in 1968, capturing 23 feature wins in a little over three years and a division championship in 1969.

The following year, Peek stepped up to the modified division, winning his first feature. He went on to win the Fonda track championships in 1972, 1973, 1974, and 1976. Peek also found success in New York at Albany-Saratoga Speedway in Malta, Rolling Wheels Raceway in Elbridge, and Weedsport Speedway, and in Vermont at the Devil's Bowl Speedway in West Haven.

Peek was inducted into the New York State Stock Car Association Hall of Fame in 1998 and the Northeast Dirt Modified Hall of Fame in 2003.
