= Kenny Shoemaker =

American racing driver (1929–2001)

- Born: Kenneth N. D. Shoemaker; September 7, 1929 Schaghticoke, New York
- Died: March 22, 2001 (aged 71)
- Retired: 1978
- Debut season: 1949

Modified racing career
- Car number: 24, 37, 50, 111
- Wins: 150+

Championship titles
- 1958 NASCAR NY Sportsman Champion

Kenneth Shoemaker (September 7, 1929 – March 22, 2001) was an American dirt modified racing driver. Known as "The Shoe", he was a hired gun who piloted 78 different cars to over 150 wins, usually at venues within driving distance of his home because of his full-time job.

== Racing career ==
Shoemaker chipped in with boyhood pal Pete Corey in 1949 to buy a 1934 coupe and make it into a stock car. They numbered the black racer number 35 to represent the purchase price and began racing at Burden Lake Speedway in Averill Park, New York. During his career, he competed successfully at the renowned tracks of the northeast, including New York venues Albany-Saratoga Speedway in Malta, Fonda Speedway, Monroe County Fairgrounds, the Syracuse Mile, Utica-Rome Speedway in Vernon, and Victoria Speedway in Dunnsville, as well as the Langhorne Speedway in Pennsylvania.

Shoemaker was inducted into the Northeast Dirt Modified and the New York State Stock Car Association Halls of Fame.
