= Lou Lazzaro =

American Modified racing driver (born 1935)

Lou "the Monk" Lazzaro
- Born: Louis P. Lazzaro; January 7, 1935 Utica, New York
- Died: May 1, 2000 (aged 65)
- Debut season: 1952

Modified racing career
- Years active: 1959-2000
- Car number: 4
- Championships: 10
- Wins: 248

Previous series
- 1952-1958: Hobby class

Championship titles
- 1964 NASCAR NY Sportsman Champion; 1968, 1971 All-Star Racing League Champion; 1969, 1971, 1972 NASCAR NY Modified Champion

Louis Lazzaro (January 7, 1935 – May 1, 2000) was an American Modified racing driver. Equally adept on both dirt and asphalt surfaces, he raced from Daytona to Canada and is credited with over 250 feature wins in a career that spanned six decades.

== Racing career ==
Known as "the Monk" to his fans, Lazzaro started racing in 1952 at the Columbia Raceway near Utica, New York, when the driver of a Hobby class car he was crewing refused to help fix the car after a wreck. Lazzaro claimed his first Hobby class feature event win in 1955 at the Brewerton Speedway, New York, and by 1959, had joined with three other friends to field his signature maroon and white Modified, aptly numbered "4".

The quartet garnered their first Modified feature win the next year at Victoria Speedway in Dunnsville, New York. Lazzaro went on to capture the 1962 and 1964 track championships at the venue, and over his career claimed four championships at the Fonda Speedway (New York), three at the Utica-Rome Speedway (Vernon, New York) and one at the Albany-Saratoga Speedway (Malta, New York). The Monk also competed successfully at New York's Orange County Fair Speedway, Syracuse Mile and Weedsport Speedway, along with the Daytona International Speedway, Florida.

Lazzaro suffered a stroke while racing at the Fonda Speedway on April 29, 2000, from which he did not recover. He was inducted into the Eastern Motorsports Press Association Hall of Fame, the New York State Stock Car Association Hall of Fame, and the Northeast Dirt Modified Hall of Fame.
