= Cliff Kotary =

American Dirt Modified racing driver (born 1919 - 2010)

- Born: Clifford L. Kotary; November 8, 1919 Floyd, New York
- Died: December 27, 2010 (aged 91)
- Retired: 1968
- Debut season: 1948

Modified racing career
- Car number: 60x, 90, 188
- Wins: 300+

Championship titles
- 1960, 1961, 1962, 1963, 1964, 1965 New York State Fair Champion

Clifford Kotary (November 8, 1919 – December 27, 2010) was an American dirt modified racing driver who accounted for over 300 feature victories. He won an unprecedented six straight New York State Fair Labor Day Championships.

== Racing career ==
Kotary began his racing career at Bennett's Field in North Utica, New York in 1948. He competed successfully at the renowned tracks throughout New York, Vermont, and Canada, including Fonda Speedway New York, Kingston Speedway Ontario, Maple Grove Speedway (Waterloo) New York, Monroe County Fairgrounds New York, State Line Speedway (Bennington) Vermont, and the Watertown Speedway New York.

In 1960, Kotary won the first of six straight New York State Fair championship events at the Syracuse Mile. His attempt for a seventh Labor Day victory in 1966 ended while he was leading with four laps remaining and the engine broke.

Kotary was inducted into the Eastern Motorsports Press Association Hall of Fame, the New York State Stock Car Association Hall of Fame and the Northeast Dirt Modified Hall of Fame.
