= Buck Holliday =

American Dirt Modified racing driver (1929-1999)

- Born: Sterling H. Holliday; October 24, 1929 Waddington, New York, U.S.
- Died: October 21, 1999 (aged 69)

Modified racing career
- Years active: 1952-1975
- Car number: C-38
- Wins: ≈100

Sterling "Buck" Holliday (October 24, 1929 – October 21, 1999) was a pioneering American Modified racing driver from Waddington, New York. Equally adept on both dirt and asphalt surfaces, he competed successfully at race venues on either side of the St. Lawrence River.

== Racing career ==
Holliday began racing in the early 1950s in New York's Northern Region including Airborne Park Speedway in Plattsburg and Fort Covington Speedway, along with Colchester Speedway in Milton in Vermont, Riverside Park Speedway in Massachusetts, and occasionally the annual National Open at Langhorne, Pennsylvania.

In 1959, Holliday started competing at the Fonda Speedway in New York, and other stops on the NASCAR Sportsman circuit (predecessor of the Xfinity Series), before stepping back to build up his trucking business. By 1965, he was regularly competing on the asphalt circuit of Capital City Speedway in Ottawa, Ontario, along with Evans Mills and Fulton Speedways in New York.

Holliday was inducted into the Northeast Dirt Modified Hall of Fame in 1995 and the New York State Stock Car Association Hall of Fame in 2004
