= Dick Nephew =

American racing driver

- Full name: Richard J. Nephew
- Born: October 4, 1928 Mooers Forks, New York, U.S.
- Died: September 26, 1996 (aged 67) Mooers Forks, New York, U.S.

Championship titles
- 1960 NASCAR Sportsman Division National Champion

Awards
- New York State Stock Car Association Hall of Fame, Northeast Dirt Modified Hall of Fame

Richard Nephew (October 4, 1928 – September 26, 1996) was an American stock car racing driver and national titlist of the NASCAR Sportsman Division.

== Racing career ==
Nephew was co-champion of the 1961 NASCAR Sportsman Division (predecessor of the O'Reilly Auto Parts Series) along with Bill Wimble. Folklore has it the “tie” was a fabrication designed to cover-up a mistake by NASCAR officials.

From 1960 to 1962, Nephew made three appearances in the Daytona 300. He otherwise spent the majority of his career racing in the Sportsman and Modified classes at the renowned tracks of the northeast and southeastern Canada, including Catamount Stadium (Milton), Malletts Bay, and Thunder Road (Barre) in Vermont; Quebec Modern Speedway in Quebec City; and Fort Covington Speedway, Utica-Rome Speedway (Vernon), and Watertown Speedway in New York.

Nephew won at least 15 track championships, including Airborne Park Speedway and Saranac Lake Speedway in New York, and Riverside in Laval, Quebec. He was inducted into the New York State Stock Car Association Hall of Fame in 1990 and into the Northeast Dirt Modified Hall of Fame in 2010.
