= Krill (disambiguation) =

Krill are small crustaceans of the order Euphausiacea.

Krill may also refer to:

== Crustaceans ==
- Antarctic krill, a species of krill
- Northern krill, a species of krill

== Arts and entertainment ==
- Krill (band), an American indie rock band
- Commander Krill, a character in the film Under Siege
- "Krill", a nickname for Dark Dragons from the video game Sky: Children of the Light
- Krill (fictional alien race), on the television series The Orville
  - "Krill" (The Orville episode), a 2017 episode of the series

== People with the surname ==
- Natalie Krill (born 1983), Canadian actress
- Sean Allan Krill (born 1971), American actor

== See also ==
- Crill, a surname (with a list of people of this name)
- KRIL (disambiguation)
