= Gary Reddick =

Canadian-American racing driver (1938-2014

- Born: Gary M. Reddick; August 19, 1938 Ottawa, Ontario, Canada
- Died: August 6, 2014 (aged 75)
- Retired: 1981
- Debut season: 1960

Modified racing career
- Car number: V-3
- Championships: 7
- Wins: ≈200

Gary Reddick (August 19, 1938 – August 6, 2014) was a Canadian driver of modified stock cars. Equally adept on both dirt and asphalt surfaces, he captured 7 track titles and nearly 200 feature wins in the northeastern United States and the southeastern Canada.

== Racing career ==
Reddick was born in Ottawa, Canada, and as a teenager moved with his family to a farm in Depauville, New York, a small hamlet with just one service station. John Geng, the station's owner, fielded a car numbered Suzy-0 at the Watertown Speedway and eventually added the S-1 and S-2 to the stable. Reddick joined the pit crew in 1959, and by the end of the 1960 season, was driving the S-3. The following season, the S-3 became his enduring V-3.

Reddick won his first feature event in 1962 and went on to win track championships at Kingston Speedway, Ontario, and the Brewerton Speedway, Can-Am Speedway (LaFargeville), Evans Mills Speedway, and Watertown Speedway ln New York. He also competed successfully at other east coast tracks, including the Capital City Speedway in Ottawa, Ontario; the Fulton Speedway, Oswego Speedway, and Syracuse Mile in New York; the Martinsville Speedway in Virginia; and Trenton Speedway, New Jersey.

In 1967, Reddick and fellow racer Dutch Hoag were credited with saving the life of veteran racer Billy Blum in a fiery crash at Fulton Speedway. Eleven years later, Reddick was faced with a similar situation at Can-Am Speedway, where he and driver Lew Miller pulled driver Kurt Bronson out of his burning car, although Bronson succumbed to his injuries weeks later.

Reddick was inducted into the Northeast Dirt Modified Hall of Fame in 2010.
