= Dutt Yanni =

American racing driver (1923–1982)

- Born: Justin N. Yanni; November 27, 1923 Syracuse, New York, U.S.
- Died: March 1, 1982 (aged 58)
- Retired: 1962

Modified racing career
- Car number: 451
- Championships: 6

Championship titles
- 1954 New York State Fair Champion

Justin N. "Dutt" Yanni (November 27, 1923 – March 1, 1982) was an American pioneering driver of modified stock cars. In 1961, he became the inaugural track champion at the then Mil-Ray Raceway in Fulton, New York.

== Racing career ==
Yanni competed throughout the 1950s on both asphalt and dirt racetracks in Central New York, including the Brewerton Speedway, Rochester's Monroe County Fairgrounds, and Williamson's Spencer Speedway, as well as venues in Pennsylvania and Canada.

Yanni was crowned New York State Champion with his victory at the 1954 State Fair. He also claimed the 1952 and 1954 track championship at LaFayette Speedway, titles in 1957 and 1960 at the Oswego Speedway, and the 1958 honors at the Watertown Speedway, all in New York.

Yanni retired from driving upon claiming the Fulton championship. He was inducted into the Oswego Speedway Hall of Fame in 2003.
