= Ken Meahl =

American Modified racing driver (1931-2025)

- Born: Kenneth M. Meahl; April 9, 1931 Lockport, New York, U.S.
- Died: February 14, 2025 (aged 93)
- Retired: 1975
- Debut season: 1948

Modified racing career
- Car number: 28, 38
- Championships: 3
- Wins: 185+

Kenneth M. Meahl (April 9, 1931 – February 14, 2025) was an American Modified racing driver. He was the driver for teen car owner Jerry Cook for several years before the NASCAR Hall of Fame driver came of age.

== Racing career ==
Meahl began racing in Western New York at the Niagara County Fairgrounds in 1948 and soon began competing with the NASCAR Modified series at the Buffalo Civic Stadium and winning the 1949 points championship at the Monroe County Fairgrounds. He went on to compete at race tracks throughout New York, including victories at Canandaigua Speedway, Fonda Speedway, Lancaster Speedway, Utica-Rome Speedway, Vernon Fairgrounds, and the Victoria Speedway in Dunnsville, claiming the Ransomville Speedway track championship in 1960 and 1966.

Meahl was also successful at venues elsewhere in the east coast, such as Merrittville Speedway in Ontario, Trenton Speedway in New Jersey, and Stafford Motor Speedway in Connecticut, and captured the 1963 Independence Day event at the Syracuse New York Mile. He was inducted into the Northeast Dirt Modified Hall of Fame in 1997.

== Personal life ==
Meahl died on February 14, 2025, at the age of 93.
