= Jack Murphy (racing driver) =

American racing driver (1927–2013)

- Born: John J. Murphy; December 22, 1927 Lysander, New York
- Died: May 2, 2013 (aged 85)
- Retired: 1971
- Debut season: 1951

Supermodified racing career
- Years active: 1961-1972
- Car number: 6

Previous series
- 1951-1970: Modified racing

Championship titles
- 1959, 1970 New York State Fair Champion

John "Irish Jack" Murphy (December 22, 1927 – May 2, 2013) was an American Modified and Supermodified racing driver. Equally skilled on asphalt and dirt-track stock cars, he won the inaugural Oswego International Classic in September 1957.

== Racing career ==
Murphy returned from the armed services in 1949 and teamed up with Fred Sass to build a sportsman stock car to compete at the Lafayette and Brewerton Speedways in Central New York. During the 1951 and 1952 racing seasons Jack dominated at the Oswego Speedway, capturing the track title in 1952.

Throughout the 1950s and 1960s, Murphy was also a fixture at other area tracks, including Canandaigua Speedway, Ithaca-Dryden Speedway, the Monroe County Fairgrounds and the Syracuse Mile, while occasionally travelling to Capital City Speedway (Ottawa, Ontario, Canada), Langhorne Speedway (Pennsylvania), and Trenton Speedway (New Jersey), where he set what was then a world's record for fastest time.

Murphy served as an inspector for the International Supermodified Association after retiring from driving. He was inducted into the Northeast Dirt Modified Hall of Fame in 2000.
