= Irving Taylor =

Irving Taylor may refer to:

- Irving Taylor (songwriter) (1914–1983), American composer, lyricist, and screenwriter
- Irving Taylor (ice hockey) (1919–1991), Canadian ice hockey player
- Irv Taylor (1929–2017), American racing driver
