= Bud Hinman =

American racing driver (born 1935)

- Born: Leroy G. Hinman; November 4, 1935 (age 91) Rome, New York

Modified racing career
- Years active: 1961-1980
- Car number: 5, 15, 98
- Championships: 2

Previous series
- 1947-present: Sprint car racing, Hot rod

Leroy "Bud" Hinman (born November 4, 1936) is a retired American auto racing driver. He began building his first hot rod as an eleven-year-old in 1947.

== Racing career ==
Hinman moved on from his boyhood fascination with hot rods to oval track racing, and by 1961 he had built a supermodified and his first stock car. Hinman went on to compete successfully at the racetracks of Central New York, including Utica-Rome Speedway and Weedsport Speedway. He claimed the 1969 track championship at the Mid-State Speedway in Morris, New York, and followed that up with the 1972 crown from the Watertown Speedway.

Hinman continues to race as an octogenarian, campaigning with the Atlantic Coast Old Timers in a 1978 Lloyd chassis sprint car previously driven by Allen Klinger to two Selinsgrove Speedway (Pennsylvania) track championships.
