= Doug Garrison =

American Dirt Modified racing driver (1930-1985)

- Born: Leroy Douglas Garrison; June 5, 1930 Hudson, New York
- Died: July 24, 1985 (aged 55)

Modified racing career
- Debut season: 1948
- Car number: X, 5, 19
- Finished last season: 1979

L. Douglas Garrison (June 5, 1930 - July 24, 1985) was a pioneering American Dirt Modified racing driver from Hudson, New York.

== Racing career ==
Garrison started racing in 1948 at the Burden Lake Speedway near Averill Park, New York. He competed regularly in New York's Capital Region, including Coxsackie Speedway, Empire Raceway in Menands, Onteora Speedway in Olivebridge, Pine Bowl Speedway near Snyders Corners, Rhineback Speedway, and Victoria Speedway in Dunnsville, with annual trips to the National Open at Langhorne Speedway, Pennsylvania.

By the early 1960s, Garrison became an icon at the Lebanon Valley Speedway, winning 30 feature events over the next decade, and capturing the 1963 track championship. He was inducted into the New York State Stock Car Association Hall of Fame in 1987 and the Northeast Dirt Modified Hall of Fame in 1993.
