= Frederick Gibson (racing driver) =

Canadian racing driver (born 1936)

Fred Gibson
- Born: Frederick Gibson; November 4, 1936 (age 90) Kingston, Ontario, Canada

Modified racing career
- Years active: 1953-1970
- Car number: 7, 25
- Championships: 5

Fred Gibson (born November 4, 1936) is a retired pioneering Canadian driver of dirt modified stock cars. In 1967 he set a record at the Kingston Speedway in Ontario, Canada, by winning 13 consecutive features.

== Racing career ==
Gibson was always among the top point leaders at the Kingston Speedway from the time he and friend Gord Botting got involved in racing as teens. Between 1962 and 1967, Gibson won five championships at three different tracks, including 1965 when he won 15 features and the second of three track championships at Kingson Speedway.

In 1966 Gibson claimed the track crown at the Watertown Speedway in New York. The following year he won the inaugural track championship at Evans Mills Speedway in New York, as well as his third Kingston title.

Gibson retired from driving and purchased the Kingston Speedway in 1971. Gibson later owned Kingston Park Raceway, a standardbred horse racing track, and was inducted to the Kingston District Sports Hall of Fame in 2005.
