= Donnie Wetmore =

American Dirt Modified racing driver (born 1950)

Donnie Wetmore Sr.
- Born: Donald L. Wetmore; May 8, 1950 (age 76)
- Retired: 1998
- Debut season: 1974

Modified racing career
- Car number: M1, 73D
- Championships: 16
- Wins: 200+

Donald Wetmore Sr. (born May 8, 1950) is an American retired Dirt Modified racing driver, credited with over 200 career wins. He is the all-time feature win leader at Fulton Speedway, New York, with 68.

== Racing career ==
Wetmore began racing in 1974 after given the opportunity to test his brother Stan's car. He won his first feature event in 1975 at Brewerton Speedway, New York, and by the end of his career, Wetmore had captured 8 championships at the track.

Wetmore competed successfully in Ontario at Humberstone Speedway, Port Colborne, and in New York at Albany-Saratoga Speedway in Malta and Can-Am Speedway in LaFargeville, while winning 6 championships at Fulton Speedway, and titles at Utica-Rome Speedway in Vernon and Weedsport Speedway.

Wetmore's final full season on the circuit was 1997, after which he continued to compete in select events, including a 2003 Sportsman win at Fulton. He was inducted into the New York State Stock Car Association Hall of Fame in 2004, and the Northeast Dirt Modified Hall of Fame in 2015.
