= Jeep Herbert =

American racing driver (1929-2002)

- Born: Howard Herbert; April 14, 1927 Milwaukee, Wisconsin
- Died: November 29, 2002 (aged 75)
- Retired: 1963
- Debut season: 1949
- Car number: 1, 11, 37, 53, 62, 451, 991

Championship titles
- 1956, 1957 NASCAR NY Sportsman Champion

Howard "Jeep" Herbert (April 14, 1927– November 29, 2002) was an American driver of dirt modified stock cars. Herbert picked up his nickname from the comic strip character "Eugene the Jeep" after dropping one side of a customer's car into the service pit at a gas station where he was employed.

== Racing career ==
Herbert began racing in 1949 at the Perth Speedway, New York, in a 1934 Ford coupe numbered 451. He centered his career at the Fonda Speedway (New York), where he claimed the track championship in 1959 and had a total of 25 wins. He also competed successfully at 40 different speedways including New York's Airborne Park Speedway, Burden Lake Speedway, Canandaigua Speedway, Monroe County Fairgrounds, Pine Bowl Speedway in Snyders Corners, Syracuse Mile, Utica-Rome Speedway, and Victoria Speedway in Dunnsville; State Line Speedway in Bennington, Vermont; Thompson Speedway in Connecticut; Trenton Speedway in New Jersey; and Langhorne Speedway in Pennsylvania.

Herbert retired from racing at age 36, having competed on both the sand at Daytona Beach and the tri-oval at Daytona International Speedway. He was inducted into the Northeast Dirt Modified and the New York State Stock Car Association Halls of Fame.
