= Don June =

American racing driver (born 1929)

- Born: Donald C. June; December 3, 1929 Theresa, New York, US
- Died: June 1, 1999 (aged 69)

Modified racing career
- Years active: 1951-1967
- Car number: 117
- Championships: 1

Donald C. June (December 3, 1929 – June 1, 1999) was a pioneering driver of dirt modified stock cars. He dominated the inaugural season at Edgewood Speedway in 1951, winning 11 feature events at the Alexandria Bay, New York oval and claiming the Adirondack Stock Car Club championship.

== Racing career ==
June began racing in 1951 in a Ford owned by George Schultz at the Edgewood and Canton (New York) speedways. A rookie, he was so unbeatable that many nights the promoters would start him on the backstretch a half-lap behind the field. June went on to compete successfully at many other area tracks, including Evans Mills Speedway, the Syracuse Mile, and Watertown Speedway in New York, and Kingston Speedway in Ontario Canada.

A master mechanic, June earned the nickname “Stroker” after his experiments with stroking a crankshaft in a Chrysler produced big horsepower gains. When forced to retire from the driver's seat after being injured in a work accident he continued on as a car owner, fielding cars for many of the top drivers. June was the crew chief for Dick May in the 1967 Daytona ARCA 200 and the Daytona Permatex 300.

June was inducted into the Northeast Dirt Modified Hall of Fame 2022.
