= Irv Taylor =

American Dirt Modified racing driver (born 1929)

- Born: Irving R. Taylor; October 18, 1929 Cohoes, New York, U.S.
- Died: April 28, 2017 (aged 87)

Modified racing career
- Debut season: 1950
- Finished last season: 1978

Irving Taylor (October 18, 1929 – April 28, 2017) was an American Modified racing driver. Always ready to accept a spot as a substitute driver to finance his own race team, he drove for twenty-two different car owners in his career, and won ten features for nine different owners just at Fonda Speedway, New York.

== Racing career ==
Taylor began his racing in 1950 at Carroll's Grove Speedway in Troy, New York, driving a four-cylinder, early-thirties Plymouth coupe with wooden spoked wheels. He competed successfully at over 32 different track including Fairmont Speedway, Vermont; Riverside Park Speedway, Massachusetts; Stafford Motor Speedway, Connecticut; Trenton Speedway, New Jersey; and in New York at Burden Lake Speedway, Corinth Speedway, Lebanon Valley Speedway, Monroe County Fairgrounds, Airborne Park Speedway (Plattsburgh), Route 66 Speedway (Poestenkill), the Syracuse Mile, Victoria Speedway (Dunnsville), and Whites Beach (Ballston Spa).

Taylor was inducted into the New York State Stock Car Association Hall of Fame in 1987, and into the Northeast Dirt Modified Hall of Fame in 2011.
