= Tony Blake (racing driver) =

- Born: Anthony Blake; February 2, 1929 Hove Sussex, England
- Died: April 14, 2003 (aged 74)
- Retired: 1974
- Debut season: 1952

Modified racing career
- Car number: 66
- Championships: 9
- Wins: 250+

Tony Blake (February 2, 1929 – April 14, 2003) was a driver of modified stock cars. Equally adept on both dirt and asphalt surfaces, he was victorious at venues on both the Canadian and American sides of the St. Lawrence River.

== Racing career ==
Tony Blake, the son of a chauffeur, grew up on an English estate in Hove Sussex. After relocating to Canada he attended an inaugural meeting for the Kingston Speedway in 1951, and the next year won the facility's grand opening event. Blake went on to victory at six additional tracks, including the Ontario Canada venues Brockville Speedway and Capital City Speedway in Ottawa, as well as the Evans Mills Speedway and Watertown Speedway in New York.

Blake claimed point championships at Brockville, Evans Mills and Watertown, to go along with six titles at the Kingston Speedway. He was inducted to the Kingston District Sports Hall of Fame in 2003, just two weeks after his unexpected death.
