= Jordan McCreadie =

American racing driver (born 1989)

- Nationality: American
- Born: 1989 (age 36–37) Watertown, New York

Modified racing career
- Debut season: 2010
- Car number: 9J, 28
- Championships: 4
- Wins: 36
- Statistics up to date as of August 31, 2026.

Jordan McCreadie (born 1989) is an American racecar driver who competes in dirt modifieds.

== Racing career ==
McCreadie pulled his brother's old car out of the weeds, put an engine in it and made his racing debut in the sportsman class in the 2010 season opener at Can-Am Speedway in LaFargeville, New York. When his motor broke in the season's last race, family friend Pierre Daigenais pushed McCreadie into the 358-Modified class the next year.

After several years of driving with Daigenais’ support and then taking care of the racing responsibilities on his own, McCreadie joined with car owners Pat and Tammy Flack to drive their #28 in both the big block and small block divisions.

In addition to Can-Am, McCreadie has competed successfully in New York at Fulton Speedway, Evans Mills Speedway, and Mohawk International Raceway in Hogansburg; and in Ontario at Brockville Speedway. He captured the 2023, 2025 and 2026 track crowns at Glen Ridge Motorsports Park in Fultonville, New York, and the 2026 championship at Thunder Mountain Speedway in Lisle, New York.

== Personal life ==
McCreadie is the son of Hall of Fame modified driver "Barefoot" Bob McCreadie, and the brother of multi-time late model national champion Tim McCreadie.
