= Doiron =

Doiron is a surname. Notable people with the surname include:

- Joseph Aubin Doiron (1922–1995), 22nd Lieutenant Governor of Prince Edward Island
- Julie Doiron (born 1972), Canadian singer and songwriter
- Noël Doiron (1684–1758), a leader of the Acadians
- Onil Doiron, Canadian politician
- Ovide Doiron (1940–2025), Canadian racing driver
- Paul Doiron, author of the Mike Bowditch series of crime novels
