= Bob Zeigler =

American racing driver (1929-2023)

- Born: Robert K. Zeigler; August 9, 1929 Boonville, New York, U.S.
- Died: February 22, 2023 (aged 93)
- Retired: 1965

Modified racing career
- Debut season: 1950
- Car number: 90
- Championships: 5

Robert Zeigler (August 9, 1929 – February 22, 2023) was an American driver and promoter of modified stock car racing. Equally adept at driving on both dirt and asphalt surfaces, he was recognized for his driving talent and respected for building a speedway during what many believe to be the golden age of stock car racing.

== Racing career ==
Zeigler, got his start building his first stock car in 1950, and after completing his military duty, returned to win his first feature in 1953 at the St. Lawrence Valley Speedway in Canton, New York. He claimed his first track championship at Fort Covington Speedway (New York) in 1954, and followed up with the 1957, 1959, and 1961 titles at the Watertown Speedway (New York).

In 1963, Zeigler made the transition from dirt to asphalt and began competing in the NASCAR Sportsman division (predecessor of the Xfinity Series) at Shangri-La Speedway (Owego, New York), Spencer Speedway (Williamson, New York), and Utica-Rome Speedway (Vernon, New York). Before hanging up his helmet, he won the 1964 track champion at Capital City Speedway, Ottawa, Ontario.

Midway through 1965, Zeigler sold his stock car, purchased land, formed a corporation with his brother Dick and cousin Karl John, and built a racetrack in Evans Mills, New York. In recognition of his pioneering successes, Bob Zeigler was inducted into the Northeast Dirt Modified Hall of Fame in 2002.
