= George Mahaffy =

American racing driver (1924–1980)

- Born: George E. Mahaffy; February 2, 1924 New York, New York, U.S.
- Died: May 17, 1980 (aged 56)

Modified racing career
- Years active: 1951-1965
- Car number: 33, 38, 64
- Championships: 1

George E. Mahaffy (February 2, 1924 – May 17, 1980) was an American dirt modified stock car driver.

== Racing career ==
Mahaffy lived just ten minutes away when the Brewerton Speedway, New York, began operating in 1950, and he quickly got involved in racing stock cars. By 1952 he began travelling to Northern New York to compete with the Adirondack Stock Car Club, which sponsored races at the Edgewood Speedway in Alexandria Bay, and the Watertown Speedway.

When the Northern Stock Car Club took over promotion of the Watertown Speedway in 1956, Mahaffey won the track championship. He continued to compete for another decade, and eventually joined up with car owner John Wawrzyniak and teamed with Art Gallo and driver Fred Barrisow to campaign twin 1939 Fords.

Mahaffy's son, Andy, continued the family presence for racing fans by working as the colorful starter "Rags" Mahaffey at the Can-Am Speedway throughout the 1980s and 1990s.
