= Ovide Doiron =

Canadian Dirt Modified racing driver (1940–2025)

- Born: September 22, 1940 Shediac, New Brunswick, Canada
- Died: May 6, 2025 (aged 84)
- Retired: 2003
- Debut season: 1958

Modified racing career
- Years active: 1972–2003
- Car number: 40
- Championships: 25
- Wins: 300+

Ovide Doiron (French: [ɔvid dwaʁɔ̃]; September 22, 1940 – May 6, 2025) was a Canadian Dirt Modified racing driver and engine builder. Credited with more than 300 wins he captured 25 track championships. Doiron became known as the "Flying Frenchman" after an incident at the Fort Covington Speedway (New York), which occasioned Doiron's car getting airborne and backward, tearing down the flag stand as he took the checkered flag for the feature event win.

== Racing career ==
Ovide Doiron got his start in the sport in 1958 by maintaining the racecars for the owners of the Riverside Speedway, an asphalt track in Laval, Quebec. He was soon driving and competing as well at the nearby Quebec City and Sherbrook speedways. Family life prompted a switch to the hobby stock and the late modal classes on dirt surfaces, while Doiron began building and maintaining his own engines.

By 1972, Doiron had moved to the modified class, competing successfully at the tracks of northern New York including Can-Am Speedway (LaFargeville), Mohawk International Raceway (Hogansburg) and Watertown Speedway, the southeastern Canadian speedways at Brockville, Cornwall, and Kingston in Ontario, and the Autodrome Edelweiss in Hull, Quebec.

In 2003, Doiron retired from driving but continued to build power plants for many of the area teams. He was inducted into the Northeast Dirt Modified Hall of Fame in 2012.

== Personal life and death ==
In 1994, at the age of 30, Doiron's son Joel followed his father into a race car, eventually claiming track championships at Cornwall as well as Autodrome Edelweiss.

Ovide Doiron died on May 6, 2025, at the age of 84.
