= Howie Westervelt =

American dirt modified racing driver (1921–1992)

- Born: Howard Westervelt; April 10, 1921 Ravena, New York
- Died: September 19, 1992 (aged 71)

Modified racing career
- Car number: 24, 38, 83
- Championships: 1
- Finished last season: 1962

Howard Westervelt (April 10, 1921-September 19, 1992) was a pioneering American Dirt Modified racing driver. He was known for turning on a rooftop mounted blue light any time he took the lead in a race.

== Racing career ==
Westervelt had a ten-race winning streak in 1959 at the Lebanon Valley Speedway, New York, ultimately capturing 17 modified features and the track championship. He competed regularly in New York's Capital Region, including Clearview Speedway in Westerlo, Fonda Speedway, Menands Raceway, Pine Bowl Speedway in Snyders Corners, Rhineback Speedway, and Victoria Speedway in Dunnsville.

Westervelt was inducted into the New York State Stock Car Association Hall of Fame in 1991 and the Northeast Dirt Modified Hall of Fame in 1997.
