= Merv Treichler =

- Born: Mervyn H. Treichler; July 28, 1944 (age 82) Sanborn, New York, U.S.
- Retired: 1987

Motorsports career
- Debut season: 1964
- Car number: 58
- Championships: 5

Championship titles
- 1970 Langhorne National Open; 1975, 1981, 1983 New York State Fair Champion

NASCAR O'Reilly Auto Parts Series career
- 24 races run over 5 years
- Best finish: 30th (1985)
- First race: 1984 Goody's 300 (Daytona)
- Last race: 1987 Winn-Dixie 300 (Charlotte)
Wins	Top tens	Poles
0	1	0

Mervyn "Merv" Treichler (born July 28, 1944) is a retired American stock car racing driver who competed on both asphalt and dirt surfaces. In 1970, he won the Race of Champions, the premier asphalt race for modifieds. He also claimed the marquee events for dirt modifieds at Super Dirt Week in 1981 and 1982.

== Racing career ==
Treichler established himself in racing in Western New York at the paved Lancaster Speedway where he won multiple track championships, and at the dirt track at Ransomville. He went on to compete successfully at the east coast race tracks from Florida to Canada, including the Flemington Speedway, New Jersey; Langhorne Speedway, Pennsylvania, Sharon Speedway Ohio; and in New York the Lebanon Valley Speedway, Oswego Speedway, and the Syracuse Mile; along with the road courses at Daytona Florida and Watkins Glen New York.

In 1984, Treichler turned his attention to the NASCAR Busch Series, where he competed part time until retiring from racing in 1987. He was inducted into the Eastern Motorsports Press Association Hall of Fame, the New York State Stock Car Association Hall of Fame, and the Northeast Dirt Modified Hall of Fame.

== Motorsports career results ==
=== NASCAR ===
(key) (Bold – Pole position awarded by qualifying time. Italics – Pole position earned by points standings or practice time. * – Most laps led.)

==== Busch Series ====
NASCAR Busch Series results
Year	Team	No.	Make	1	2	3	4	5	6	7	8	9	10	11	12	13	14	15	16	17	18	19	20	21	22	23	24	25	26	27	28	29	30	31	NBGNC	Pts	Ref
1984	J & J Racing	26	Olds	DAY; 14	RCH	CAR	HCY	MAR	DAR	ROU	NSV	LGY	MLW	DOV	CLT	SBO	HCY	ROU	SBO	ROU	HCY	IRP	LGY	SBO	BRI	DAR	RCH	NWS	CLT	HCY	CAR	MAR			78th	121	
1985	J & J Racing	58	Olds	DAY 11	CAR 18	HCY	BRI	MAR	DAR 15	SBO	LGY	DOV 27	CLT 37	SBO	HCY	ROU	IRP	SBO	LGY	HCY															31st	792	
1985	Genesee Truck Sales	58	Olds																		MLW 20	BRI	DAR 35	RCH	NWS	ROU	CLT 34	HCY	CAR 28	MAR					31st	792	
1986	Genesee Truck Sales	58	Olds	DAY; 42	CAR	HCY							DOV 18	CLT 41	SBO	HCY	ROU										DAR 33	RCH	DOV 26		ROU	CLT; 41	CAR		34th	775	
1986	Genesee Truck Sales	58	Chevy				MAR; 9	BRI	DAR	SBO	LGY	JFC						IRP; 29	SBO	RAL; 13	OXF	SBO	HCY	LGY	ROU	BRI				MAR; 26				MAR; 16	34th	775	
1987	J & J Racing	58	Buick	DAY; 37	HCY																														52nd	165	
1987	J & J Racing	58	Chevy			MAR; 31	DAR'	BRI	LGY	SBO																									52nd	165	
1987	Magnum Oil	58	Buick								CLT; 40	DOV	IRP	ROU	JFC	OXF	SBO	HCY	RAL	LGY	ROU	BRI	JFC	DAR	RCH	DOV	MAR	CLT	CAR	MAR					52nd	165	
