= Crill =

Crill is a surname. Notable people with the surname include:

- Dell Crill (1939–1997), American racing driver
- Peter Crill (1925–2005), Bailiff of Jersey, Channel Islands

== See also ==
- Krill, small crustaceans
