= Bob McCreadie =

American Dirt Modified racing driver (1951–2024)

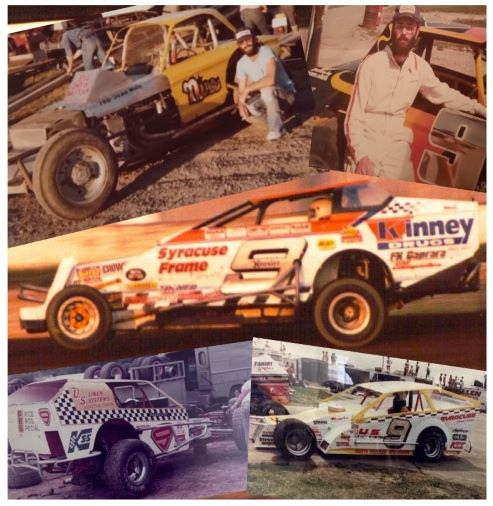
- Born: January 19, 1951 Watertown, New York, U.S.
- Died: May 15, 2024 (aged 73) Watertown, New York, U.S.
- Retired: 2006

Modified racing career
- Debut season: 1971 Watertown Speedway
- Car number: 9
- Championships: 29
- Wins: 507

Championship titles
- 1994, 1995 Mr. Dirt Champion; 1985, 1994, 1995 Super DIRT Series

Awards
- Lowe's Motor Speedway Walk of Fame; Northeast Dirt Modified Hall of Fame; Eastern Motorsport Press Association Hall of Fame; 1994 EMPA Al Holbert National Driver of the Year

Robert David "Barefoot Bob" McCreadie (January 19, 1951 – May 15, 2024) was an American Dirt Modified racing driver. He is an inductee to the Lowe's Motor Speedway Walk of Fame, the Northeast Dirt Modified Hall of Fame, and the Eastern Motorsport Press Association Hall of Fame.

== Racing career ==
Upon his induction to the Eastern Motorsports Hall of Fame, the Press Association expressed that "Barefoot" Bob McCreadie was famous for his full beard, spectacles, heavy foot and iconic No. 9 dirt-track Modified stock cars that were always towed on an open trailer by a station wagon that was loaded with tools and supplies, and developed a following among those in the grandstands.

McCreadie raced from Florida to the southwestern United States and in Australia and Canada, compiling 507 track victories between 1975–2005. He has won at 56 speedways, captured 29 points championships and eight series championships. McCreadie won the prestigious Super DIRT Week race in 1986 at the Syracuse Mile. He has earned two Mr. DIRT Modified Championships and three Super DIRT Series Championships including back-to-back Super DIRT series titles in 1994 and 1995.

== Injuries ==
McCreadie broke his back five times in racing accidents, the most serious of which involved a crash in 1988 at Weedsport Speedway when he lost his steering after breaking a bolt and driving off the back straightaway at full speed.

On May 31, 2006, McCreadie, suffered serious injuries when his Harley-Davidson motorcycle was struck by a car in a parking lot in his hometown. McCreadie suffered a fractured femur, two broken ribs and a chip fracture of the lumbar spine, and was unable to return to his racing career. In 2009 a jury awarded McCreadie nearly 1.5 million in damages.

== Personal life ==
Folklore has it that McCreadie got the nickname of “Barefoot” when the cockpit of his home built Plymouth Barracuda was so tight that he couldn't wedge his right foot past the transmission linkage to get it on the accelerator with his shoe on. McCreadie has said that he actually got the nickname as a teenager due to the fact that he spent a lot of his time in the summer running around bare-chested and shoeless.

Bob and Sandy McCreadie had three children: Tim, Tyne and Jordan. Both Tim and Jordan carry on the family tradition as race car drivers.

McCreadie died in Watertown, New York on May 15, 2024, at the age of 73.
