= Pete Corey =

American racing driver (born 1929)

- Born: Peter J. Corey; October 5, 1929 Bennington, VT
- Died: August 4, 2000 (aged 70)

Modified racing career
- Debut season: 1949
- Car number: 3
- Championships: 4
- Finished last season: 1973

Championship titles
- 1955 Langhorne National Open

Peter Corey (October 5, 1929 – August 4, 2000) was a driver of modified stock cars. One of the most popular drivers at Fonda Speedway, New York, he claimed the track championship in 1957, 1965, and 1966, and had a total of 50 wins at the venue during his career. Singer Grady Watson recorded a song about Corey called the Ballad of Number 3, which became a regional hit on country and western radio.

== Racing career ==
Corey chipped in with boyhood pal Kenny Shoemaker in 1949 to buy a 1934 coupe and make it into a stock car. They numbered the black racer number 35 to represent the purchase price and began racing New York's Capital District at Burden Lake Speedway, Carroll's Grove Speedway in Troy, Pine Bowl Speedway in Snyders Corners, and State Line Speedway in Bennington, Vermont. In 1955, Corey was tapped to drive the Bob Mott owned Li'l Yellow No. 3 and went undefeated during the first five weeks of the 1955 season at Fonda, kickstarting a legend.

Early in the 1960 season, a racing accident lead to the amputation of the lower section of Corey's left leg, but he returned to action the next season with a prosthetic limb. His first race back was at Victoria Speedway in Dunnsville, New York. Corey won the feature and capped a comeback season by winning the track's point championship.

Corey was inducted into the Northeast Dirt Modified and the New York State Stock Car Association Halls of Fame.

== Personal life ==
Corey enlisted in the United States Navy at the age of 14 at the height of World War II. At the age of 15, after a naval doctor discovered his true age, he was honorably discharged. Corey's daughter is former New York State Senator Kathy Marchione.
