= Perth, New York =

- Town
- Location within New York Location within the United States
- Coordinates: 43°0′19″N 74°10′47″W
- Country: United States
- State: New York
- County: Fulton

Government
  - Type: Town Council
  - Town Supervisor: Gregory Fagan (R)
  - Town Council: Members' List: • Robert E. Fisher (R); • Gay Lewandowski (R); • Paul Priamo (R); • Byron A. Barker (R)

Area
  - Total: 26.11 sq mi (67.63 km^{2})
  - Land: 26.09 sq mi (67.56 km^{2})
  - Water: 0.023 sq mi (0.06 km^{2})
- Elevation: 843 ft (257 m)

Population (2010)
  - Total: 3,646
  - Estimate (2016): 3,497
  - Density: 134.1/sq mi (51.76/km^{2})
- Time zone: UTC-5 (Eastern (EST))
  - Summer (DST): UTC-4 (EDT)
- ZIP Codes: 12010 (Amsterdam); 12070 (Fort Johnson); 12095 (Johnstown); 12086 (Hagaman)
- FIPS code: 36-035-57353
- GNIS feature ID: 0979357
- Website: perthny.gov

Perth (/pɜːrθ/) is a town in Fulton County, New York, United States. The population was 3,646 at the 2010 census. It is in the southeastern corner of the county, north of Amsterdam. The town is named after Perth, Scotland.

== History ==
The land was first settled circa 1772 by pioneers from Scotland. The town of Perth was formed from part of the town of Amsterdam in 1838, when Fulton County was created. In 1842, the size of the town was increased by the annexation of land from the towns of Broadalbin and Mayfield.

== Notable people ==
- Robert P. Aitken (1819–1873), Michigan State Representative and Civil War veteran.
- Mike Tyson, boxer, was a one-time resident of the Tryon School for Boys in the town.

== Geography ==
According to the United States Census Bureau, the town has a total area of 26.1 square miles (67.6 km^{2}), of which 0.027 square miles (0.07 km^{2}), or 0.11%, is water.

Perth is east of Johnstown, the Fulton County seat. The eastern town line is the border of Saratoga County, and the southern town line is the border of Montgomery County. The city of Amsterdam is 5 miles (8 km) south of the center of Perth.

New York State Route 30 is a north-south highway which passes through Perth.

== Demographics ==
Historical population
Census	Pop.	Note	%±
1840	737		—
1850	1,140		54.7%
1860	1,085		−4.8%
1870	1,013		−6.6%
1880	915		−9.7%
1890	769		−16.0%
1900	667		−13.3%
1910	695		4.2%
1920	596		−14.2%
1930	838		40.6%
1940	1,000		19.3%
1950	1,299		29.9%
1960	1,768		36.1%
1970	2,383		34.8%
1980	3,261		36.8%
1990	3,377		3.6%
2000	3,638		7.7%
2010	3,646		0.2%
2016 (est.)	3,497		−4.1%
U.S. Decennial Census

As of the census of 2000, there were 3,638 people, 1,318 households, and 951 families residing in the town. The population density was 139.6 inhabitants per square mile (53.9/km^{2}). There were 1,416 housing units at an average density of 54.3 per square mile (21.0/km^{2}). The racial makeup of the town was 91.51% White, 6.40% African American, 0.22% Native American, 0.36% Asian, 0.58% from other races, and 0.93% from two or more races. Hispanic or Latino of any race were 3.52% of the population.

There were 1,318 households, out of which 30.4% had children under the age of 18 living with them, 57.2% were married couples living together, 9.9% had a female householder with no husband present, and 27.8% were non-families. 23.4% of all households were made up of individuals, and 9.0% had someone living alone who was 65 years of age or older. The average household size was 2.49 and the average family size was 2.90.

In the town, the population was spread out, with 31.0% under the age of 18, 5.4% from 18 to 24, 26.4% from 25 to 44, 24.4% from 45 to 64, and 12.8% who were 65 years of age or older. The median age was 37 years. For every 100 females, there were 107.5 males. For every 100 females age 18 and over, there were 95.6 males.

The median income for a household in the town was $39,932, and the median income for a family was $46,181. Males had a median income of $30,032 versus $23,750 for females. The per capita income for the town was $16,870. About 5.9% of families and 6.1% of the population were below the poverty line, including 5.0% of those under age 18 and 4.1% of those age 65 or over.

== Communities and locations in Perth ==
- Beyers Corners – A hamlet in the eastern part of Perth on County Road 132.
- Chuctenunda Creek – A stream flowing through the southeastern section of Perth to Amsterdam.
- Perth (formerly "Perth Center") – The hamlet of Perth is in the north-central part of the town on NY-30.
- Stairs Corners – A hamlet in the eastern part of the town on County Road 126.
- West Galway – A hamlet by the eastern town line. This part of Perth was settled circa 1774.
- West Perth – A hamlet by the western town boundary on County Road 107.

== Sports ==
The original Fulton & Montogomery Speedway (aka Perth Speedway) opened in 1947 as a ¼ mile dirt oval facility west of the hamlet of Perth. The racetrack was where 1956 and 1957 NASCAR New York Sportsman champion Jeep Herbert competed in his first race. In 1950, the Tri-County Racing Association moved operations to a new 4/10ths mile dirt oval in Perth Center. The original venue continued to operate as Willett's or West Perth Speedway through 1951. (Note: Geolocation of original oval: 43.0070°N 74.2382°W Geolocation of the later oval: 43.0142°N 74.1877°W)
