= 1958 Jim Mideon 500 =

Auto race held at Exhibition Stadium in 1958

Coordinates: 43°37′55″N 79°25′4″W

Race details
- Race 31 of 51 in the 1958 NASCAR Grand National Series season
- Date: July 18, 1958; 68 years ago
- Official name: Jim Mideon 500
- Location: Exhibition Stadium, Toronto, Ontario, Canada
- Course: Permanent racing facility
- Course length: 0.333 miles (0.535 km)
- Distance: 100 laps, 33.3 mi (53.5 km)
- Weather: Chilly with temperatures of 19.3 °C (66.7 °F); Wind speeds of 18.3 kilometres per hour (11.4 mph)
- Average speed: 43.184 mph (69.498 km/h)

Pole position
Driver	Rex White	Julian Petty

Most laps led
Driver	Rex White	Julian Petty
- Laps: 69

Winner
No. 42	Lee Petty	Petty Enterprises

Television in the United States
- Network: untelevised
- Announcers: none

The 1958 Jim Mideon 500 (known officially as 1958-31) was a NASCAR Grand National Series event that was held on Friday, July 18, 1958, at Exhibition Stadium in Toronto, Ontario, Canada.

Children were entertained with a jigsaw puzzle of the Royal Family before the race began. Most of the cars in the race were either Chevrolet or Ford. All of the 19 drivers on the racing grid were born in the United States of America. Admission to the race was CA$2 for adults ($22 when adjusted for inflation) and $0.50 for children ($5 when adjusted for inflation).

The local bi-laws of the late 1950s allowed only team sports to be played professionally on Sunday. Since stock car racing wasn't included as one of the permitted "team sports," they had to operate the race on a Friday night in compliance with city officials.

== Race report ==
Prior to the race, invocation services were held along with the singing of The Star-Spangled Banner and God Save the Queen (Canada's official national anthem in 1958). The first green flag of the race was waved at 8:00 P.M. Eastern Daylight Saving Time (EDT) and the checkered flag was waved at approximately 8:46 P.M. EDT. One hundred laps were resolved in forty-six minutes on a paved oval track spanning 0.333 miles or 0.536 kilometres; making it a shorter track than Martinsville Speedway. The track itself was reported as being nearly a carbon copy of Bowman Gray Stadium in Winston-Salem, North Carolina.

Lee Petty (in his 1957 Oldsmobile 88) defeated Cotton Owens (in his 1957 Pontiac Catalina) by racing at speeds up to 43.184 miles per hour or 69.498 kilometres per hour. Rex White earned the event's pole position by qualifying with a speed of 51.406 miles per hour or 82.730 kilometres per hour. Dick Walters received a last-place finish in this race due to an incident with his car's rear end.

This race is known for the debut of a young driver at 21 years, 16 days, Richard Petty, in car #142 (triple-digit numbers were legal in NASCAR until the 1970s). Even though NASCAR is usually associated with the Southern United States, Richard Petty's first Grand National Series race was officially on Canadian soil. He finished in 17th place; ten positions worse than he started. It was suggested that Lee Petty intentionally knocked his son out of the race due to racing issues. However, the truth of the matter was that Lee was trying to out-lap his son Richard (who was driving too slow) but used his "chrome horn" to take out the young Petty in his first race. More than 9,700 live spectators were on hand for this race even though heavy rainfall made the track somewhat slippery.

The race car drivers still had to commute to the races using the same stock cars that competed in a typical weekend's race through a policy of homologation (and under their own power). This policy was in effect until roughly 1975. By 1980, NASCAR had completely stopped tracking the year model of all the vehicles and most teams did not take stock cars to the track under their own power anymore.

=== Qualifying ===
Grid	No.	Driver	Manufacturer	Owner
1	44	Rex White	'57 Chevrolet	Julian Petty
2	7	Jim Reed	'57 Ford	Jim Reed
3	42	Lee Petty	'57 Oldsmobile	Petty Enterprises
4	6	Cotton Owens	'57 Pontiac	Jim Stephens
5	99	Shorty Rollins	'58 Ford	Shorty Rollins
6	23	Johnny Mackinson	'57 Mercury	Ken Corman
7	142	Richard Petty	'57 Oldsmobile	Petty Enterprises
8	57	Billy Rafter	'57 Ford	Billy Rafter
9	74	L.D. Austin	'56 Chevrolet	L.D. Austin
10	17	Howard Phillippi	'57 Ford	Howard Phillippi

=== Post-race consequences ===
The purse of the race was US$4,200 ($46,869 when adjusted for inflation). To this day, this is the only event in the modern-day NASCAR Cup Series to take place in Canada, and the last event in the series outside the United States until 2025, as the track itself was later torn down to make way for newer development. The site of the race track is now a soccer stadium and fairgrounds.

NASCAR would eventually return to a more prepared Canada in the 21st century. However, it would be to Montreal's Circuit Gilles Villeneuve for the Nationwide Series in addition to various small-town tracks for the "local" NASCAR Canadian Tire Series. Cayuga Speedway (now Jukasa Motor Speedway) wanted to host the first-ever Nationwide Series race in Canada but was turned down by NASCAR at a later date. Since then, the track has been on hiatus.

In 2010, Exhibition Place hosted its first NASCAR-sanctioned race since this race, the Jumpstart 100, on a temporary street course spanning 1.721 miles (2.770 km), for the Canadian Tire Series as part of Honda Indy Toronto weekend.

== Finishing order ==
Pos	Grid	No.	Driver	Manufacturer	Laps	Laps led	Winnings	Time/Status
1	3	42	Lee Petty	Oldsmobile	100	29	$575	0:46:16
2	4	6	Cotton Owens	Pontiac	100	0	$480	Finished on lead lap
3	2	7	Jim Reed	Ford	100	0	$305	Finished on lead lap
4	5	99	Shorty Rollins	Ford	100	0	$275	Finished on lead lap
5	6	23	Johnny Mackinson	Mercury	99	0	$220	+1 lap
6	8	57	Bill Rafter	Ford	99	0	$210	+1 laps
7	1	44	Rex White	Chevrolet	98	71	$190	+2 laps
8	12	79	Tiny Benson	Chevrolet	98	0	$175	+2 laps
9	11	711	Bill Poor	Pontiac	97	0	$180	+3 laps
10	17	95	Bob Duell	Ford	96	0	$150	+4 laps
11	10	17	Howard Phillippi	Ford	94	0	$160	+6 laps
12	9	74	L.D. Austin	Chevrolet	93	0	$120	+7 laps
13	16	93	Ted Chamberlain	Chevrolet	92	0	$115	+8 laps
14	14	33	Al White	Ford	86	0	$105	+14 laps
15	18	13	Peck Peckham	Chevrolet	86	0	$95	+14 laps
16	15	41	Neil Haight	Chevrolet	69	0	$105	+31 laps
17	7	142	Richard Petty	Oldsmobile	55	0	$115	Terminal vehicle damage
18	13	83	Lennie Page	Ford	22	0	$90	Ignition problems
19	19	18	Dick Walters	Ford	18	0	$60	Missing rear end

== Timeline ==
Section reference:

- Start of race: Rex White started the race with the pole position.
- Lap 18: The rear end of Dick Walters' vehicle was problematic, forcing him to exit the event early.
- Lap 72: Lee Petty takes over the lead from Rex White.
- Lap 90: Lennie Page withdrew from the event due to problems with his ignition.
- Lap 115: Richard Petty had a terminal crash; forcing him to withdraw from the race.
- Finish: Lee Petty was officially declared the winner of the race.
