= Doug Hoffman (racing driver) =

American Dirt Modified racing driver (born 1958)

- Born: Douglas C. Hoffman; October 30, 1958 Allentown, Pennsylvania, U.S.
- Died: December 4, 2012 (aged 54)
- Retired: 2009

Modified racing career
- Debut season: 1977
- Car number: 60 over
- Championships: 25
- Wins: 482

Championship titles
- 1991 Mr. Dirt Champion; 1991 Super DIRT Series Champion; 1991, 1993 New York State Fair Champion; 2004 NASCAR Northeast Regional Champion

Awards
- 1983 EMPA Al Holbert National Driver of the Year

Douglas Hoffman (October 30, 1958 – December 4, 2012) was an American Modified racing driver. He won 482 feature events and 25 championships at 40 different tracks in nine states and two Canadian provinces.

== Racing career ==
Hoffman began his racing career in the late model division at the former Dorney Park Speedway in Pennsylvania, winning in his fifth start. He competed regularly in Pennsylvania at Grandview Speedway, Nazareth Speedway, Penn National Speedway, and won five track championships at Big Diamond Speedway. Hoffman also raced successfully in New Jersey at East Windsor and Flemington Speedway, and in New York at Fonda Speedway, Lebanon Valley Speedway, and Orange County Fair Speedway (Middletown).

Hoffman also followed the NASCAR Whelen Modified Tour and had one win. In 1996, he won the Super Dirt Week main event at the Syracuse Mile.

After his retirement from driving, Hoffman successfully promoted Mahoning Valley Speedway in Pennsylvania for several years, and just prior to his death, took on the promoter's job at Bridgeport Speedway, New Jersey. He was inducted into Northeast Dirt Modified Hall of Fame in 2011.
