= Tiny Benson =

American racing driver (1922–2017)

- Born: Reed Benson; April 24, 1922 Syracuse, NY
- Died: May 2, 2017 (aged 95) Rockledge, FL, U.S.
- Retired: 1961

NASCAR Cup Series career
- 6 races run over 2 years
- Best finish: 73rd (1958)
- First race: 1958 (Reading, PA)
- Last race: 1959 (Trenton NJ)
Wins	Top tens	Poles
0	4	0

Reed (Tiny) Benson (April 24, 1922 – May 2, 2017) was an American stock car and sprint car racing driver who retired from competition in 1961.

== Racing career ==
Benson made six appearances in the NASCAR Grand National Series from 1958 to 1959. He otherwise spent the majority of his career racing in the Sportsman and Modified divisions at the renowned tracks of New York including the Brewerton, Oswego, and Weedsport Speedways, along with the Watertown Speedway, where he was 1955 track champion.

== Motorsports career results ==
=== NASCAR ===
(key) (Bold – Pole position awarded by qualifying time. Italics – Pole position earned by points standings or practice time. * – Most laps led.)

==== Grand National Series ====
NASCAR Grand National Series results
Year	Team	No.	Make	1	2	3	4	5	6	7	8	9	10	11	12	13	14	15	16	17	18	19	20	21	22	23	24	25	26	27	28	29	30	31	32	33	34	35	36	37	38	39	40	41	42	43	44	45	46	47	48	49	50	51	NGNC	Pts	Ref
1958	Besemer Engineering	79	Chevy	FAY	DAB	CON	FAY	WIL	HBO	FAY	CLB	PIF	ATL	CLT	MAR	ODS	OBS	GPS	GBF	STR	NWS	BGS	TRN	RSD	CLB	NBS	REF; 19	LIN	HCY	AWS	RSP	MCC	SLS	TOR; 8	BUF; 8	MCF; 16	BEL	BRR	CLB	NSV	AWS	BGS	MBS	DAR	CLT	BIR	CSF	GAF	RCH	HBO	SAS	MAR	NWS	ATL	73rd	182.13	
1959	Besemer Engineering	79	Chevy	FAY	DAY	DAY	HBO	CON	ATL	WIL	BGS	CLB	NWS	REF; 7	HCY	MAR	TRN; 10	CLT	NSV	ASP	PIF	GPS	ATL	CLB	WIL	RCH	BGS	AWS	DAY	HEI	CLT	MBS	CLT	NSV	AWS	BGS	GPS	CLB	DAR	HCY	RCH	CSF	HBO	MAR	AWS	NWS	CON								145th	204.50	
