= Don Diffendorf =

American Dirt Modified racing driver (born 1929)

- Born: Donald J. Diffendorf Sr. February 9, 1929 Binghamton, New York
- Died: April 21, 2012 (aged 83)
- Retired: 1978
- Debut season: 1951

Modified racing career
- Car number: S/360
- Championships: 2
- Wins: 100+

Championship titles
- 1969, 1971 New York State Fair Champion

Donald Diffendorf (February 9, 1929 – April 21, 2012) was an American dirt modified racing driver who accounted for over 100 feature victories. His most famous ride was Glenn Scott's iconic S/360, numbered for the IBM System 360 computers Scott sold.

== Racing career ==
Diffendorf began his racing career at Five Mile Point Speedway, Kirkwood, New York, the year the track opened in 1951. He competed successfully elsewhere in New York, including Fulton Speedway, Lancaster Speedway, and Oswego Speedway, while claiming championship titles at Five Mile Point and Shangri-La Speedway in Owego.

In 1969 and again in 1971, Diffendorf won the New York State Fair championship event at the Syracuse Mile He was inducted into the New York State Stock Car Association Hall of Fame in 2012, and into the Northeast Dirt Modified Hall of Fame in 2016.
