= Steve Danish =

American Dirt Modified racing driver (1919-2003)

- Born: Stephen Danish; March 16, 1919 Green Island, New York
- Died: August 12, 2003 (aged 84)

Motorsport career
- Debut season: 1949
- Car number: 61
- Championships: 5
- Wins: 120
- Finished last season: 1966

Championship titles
- 1953 NASCAR NY Sportsman Champion

Stephen Danish (March 16, 1919 – August 8, 2003) was an American sprint car and midget racer, who became a pioneering stock car driver. He was known for his neatly pressed tan driving uniform and dent free, pristine, finely lettered race cars.

== Racing career ==
Danish drove open-cockpit race cars before and after World War II, but in 1949 changed his focus to the sportsman stock cars trending in popularity. He impressed his competitors by beating flathead V-8 powered cars with his 6-cylinder engine, and soon captured track championships at Mettowee Speedway in Granville, New York and State Line Speedway near Bennington, Vermont.

Danish competed regularly in New York's Capital Region, including Airborne Park Speedway in Plattsburg, Arlington Speedway, Richfield Springs Speedway, and Victoria Speedway in Dunnsville, with annual trips to the National Open at Langhorne Speedway, Pennsylvania. He captured three Fonda (New York) Speedway track championships.

Danish retired from racing in 1966 with 120 feature event wins. He was inducted into the New York State Stock Car Association Hall of Fame in 1984 and the Northeast Dirt Modified Hall of Fame in 1994.
