= Pat Ward (racing driver) =

American Dirt Modified racing driver (born 1957)

- Born: Patrick Ward; March 6, 1957 (age 69) Genoa, New York

Modified racing career
- Debut season: 1979
- Car number: 42P
- Championships: 4
- Wins: 151

Previous series
- 1973-1978: Late model

Championship titles
- 1998 New York State Fair Champion; 2004 Mr. Dirt 358 Modified Champion; 2007, 2008, 2009 Race of Champions Dirt Modified Tour
- Statistics up to date as of July 23, 2024.

Patrick Ward (March 6, 1957) is an American Dirt Modified racing driver, currently credited with over 145 career wins at 17 tracks in New York, Pennsylvania, and Florida.

== Racing career ==
Ward began his racing career in 1973 in a late model Mustang at Weedsport Speedway, New York. Since progressing to the Modified division, he has claimed track championships in New York at Can-Am Speedway in LaFargeville, Fulton Speedway, and Utica-Rome Speedway in Vernon. He has also competed and been victorious at the east coast race tracks from Florida to Canada, including Selinsgrove Speedway in Pennsylvania and Brewerton Speedway, Fonda Speedway, and the Syracuse Mile in New York.

Ward is also a respected fabricator and mechanic, having built his own cars and engines for much of his early career, and then joining manufacturer Howard Conkey's Show Car Engineering company in 1982.

Ward was inducted into the Northeast Dirt Modified Hall of Fame in 2021.
