= KRIL (disambiguation) =

KRIL may refer to:

- KRIL, a radio station in Texas
- Rifle Garfield County Airport, Colorado, United States (ICAO code: KRIL)

== See also ==
- Krill, small crustaceans
