= Saranac Lake Speedway =

Defunct motorsport venue in Saranac Lake, New York

- Location: Saranac Lake, New York
- Coordinates: 44.3503°N 74.1341°W
- Owner: Aaron and Pearl Hoyt
- Opened: 1959
- Closed: 1968

Oval
- Surface: Clay
- Length: .8 km (0.50 mi)
- Turns: 4

Saranac Lake Speedway was a 0.5-mile (0.80 km) dirt oval raceway in the Adirondack Mountains of New York State. It was a home track of 1960 national NASCAR Sportsman Division co-champion Dick Nephew, who also captured the speedway's title that same year.

== Overview ==
In 1959 Aaron and Pearl Hoyt, owners of the local Chrysler dealership in Saranac Lake, New York, set out to convert the old potato field along their Trudeau Road farm into a one-half mile clay-topped speedway. The venue drew fans and competitors from Canada, Vermont, and Northern New York.

The track operated for its first season and part of a second on Sunday afternoons, switching to Friday nights in August 1960. After the 1967 racing schedule was by ravaged by weather conditions, Pat Hotte, who promoted two other tracks, Fort Covington, New York, and Maxville Speedway in Ontario, Canada, operated the facility for a year before it closed permanently.
