= Jerry Cook =

American racing driver (born 1943)

- Nationality: United States
- Born: June 20, 1943 (age 83) Lockport, New York, U.S.
- Retired: 1982
- Debut season: 1956

NASCAR Modified Tour
- Years active: 1968–1982
- Wins: 341
- Best finish: 1st in 1971–72, 1974–77

Previous series
- 1973 1956-1967: NASCAR Winston Cup Series; Modified-Sportsman

Championship titles
- 1971,'72,'74 '75,'76,'77 1972: NASCAR National Modified Champion; All Star Stock Car Racing League Champion

Awards
- 1989 1993 1998 2009 2011 2016: NMPA Hall of Fame; NYSSCA Hall of Fame; NASCAR's 50 Greatest Drivers; IM Hall of Fame; NDM Hall of Fame; NASCAR Hall of Fame

Jerry Cook (born June 20, 1943) is an American NASCAR modified championship race car driver. He began racing at the age of 13 and won the track championship at Utica-Rome Speedway in 1969.

== Racing career ==
Cook built his first modified in 1956 to compete at Ransomville Speedway in Western New York, naming Cam Gagliardi as his driver. In 1959, he built a car for Hall of Fame driver Ken Meahl. It was number 38 and that became Cook's career number. In 1962, Meahl totaled two cars, and Cook decided that if he had to fix them he might as well drive them. In 1963, at age 18, he started racing and won his first main event that year at Utica-Rome.

Cook eventually went to become a six-time champion in the NASCAR Modified series (1971–72, 1974–77). His rivalry with fellow Rome, New York driver Richie Evans is legendary. He retired after the 1982 season with 342 wins. He stayed with the sport, and helped shape the series.

In 1973, Cook attempted to qualify for the Daytona 500 in a No. 07 Chevrolet. In his Daytona 500 Qualifying Race, he spun on lap 44 and finished 25th, failing to make the 500.

== NASCAR administration ==
Cook served as the Whelen Modified Series' director when it began in 1985, and retired as NASCAR's Competition Administrator in 2015.

== Awards ==
- Inducted in the International Motorsports Hall of Fame in 2009
- In 1989, he was inducted into the National Motorsports Press Association Hall of Fame
- Inducted into the New York State Stock Car Association Hall of Fame in 1993
- As part of NASCAR's 50th Anniversary celebration in 1998, he was named one of NASCAR's 50 Greatest Drivers.
- NASCAR named him #3 on its NASCAR Modified All-Time Top 10 list.
- Inducted into the NASCAR Hall of Fame in 2016
- Inducted in the Northeast Dirt Modified Hall of Fame inducted in 2011.
- Named one of NASCAR's 75 Greatest Drivers (2023)

== Motorsports career results ==
=== NASCAR ===
(key) (Bold – Pole position awarded by qualifying time. Italics – Pole position earned by points standings or practice time. * – Most laps led.)

==== Winston Cup Series ====
NASCAR Winston Cup Series results
Year	Team	No.	Make	1	2	3	4	5	6	7	8	9	10	11	12	13	14	15	16	17	18	19	20	21	22	23	24	25	26	27	28	NWCC	Pts	Ref
1973		07	Chevy	RSD	DAY; DNQ	RCH	CAR	BRI	ATL	NWS	DAR	MAR	TAL	NSV	CLT	DOV	TWS	RSD	MCH	DAY	BRI	ATL	TAL	NSV	DAR	RCH	DOV	NWS	MAR	CLT	CAR	NA	-	

===== Daytona 500 =====
Year	Team	Manufacturer	Start	Finish
1973		Chevrolet	DNQ	
