= Central New York Raceway Park =

Motorsports complex in Central Square, New York

Coordinates: 43°15′6″N 76°8′26″W

- Location: 154 U.S. Route 11, Central Square, New York, United States
- Broke ground: 2014
- Opened: 2015 (RallyCross)
- Closed: July 2024
- Major events: SCCA RallyCross
- Website: CentralNYRacewayPark.com

Road Course
- Surface: Asphalt
- Length: 2.20 mi (3.54 km)

5/8 mile dirt oval
- Surface: Synthetic dirt
- Length: 0.624 mi (1.005 km)

Central New York Raceway Park was a proposed motorsports complex in Central Square, New York, United States. The complex was to feature a 2.2 mile (3.54 km) road course and a 5/8 mile synthetic dirt oval for both auto & harness racing. The 2.2 mile road course was designed by Peter Argetsinger and was to be the only natural terrain road course in North America featuring a permanent lighting system. The 5/8 mile synthetic dirt oval was also to feature a smaller oval for go-karts and flat track speedway bike racing.

In September 2015, the track announced that the 5/8 mile synthetic dirt oval will host Super DIRT Week featuring the Super DIRTcar Series starting in 2016. While the road course & oval tracks have been under development, the circuit also hosts the SCCA CNY Region Rallycross.

In March 2016, the track announced that the 5/8 mile synthetic dirt oval will host the AMA Pro Flat Track on August 20, 2016. CNYRP also announced that MotoAmerica will race on the 2.2 mile road course in 2017.

Construction on the road course and dirt track stalled in 2016 due first to delayed state grants and then the Covid epidemic. The project was halted and the property was repurposed when Micron Technology agreed in October 2022 to invest up to $100 billion to build a mega-complex of chip manufacturing plants in Syracuse's northern suburbs.
