= Brookfield Speedway =

Motorsport venue in Brookfield, New York

- Location: Brookfield, New York
- Coordinates: 42.8192°N 75.31036°W
- Owner: Madison County Fair Board
- Opened: 1950
- Former names: Madison County Fairgrounds
- Website: www.madisoncountyfairny.com

Oval
- Surface: Dirt
- Length: .4 km (0.25 mi)
- Turns: 4

Brookfield Speedway is a quarter-mile dirt oval raceway located on the Madison County Fairgrounds in Central New York State.

== Overview ==
The Madison County Fairgrounds held its first motorized race with sprint cars in 1935. When the grandstand was rebuilt in 1950 stock car racing became a weekly summer event until shutting down in 1961. The speedway reopened from 1977 until 1981, and in 1995 Mike Budka Jr. and Fred Bagley negotiated a single-year lease with the Madison County Fair Board.

Except for some exhibition races by a regional antique stock car club, the track then remained dormant for the next two decades.

In 2019, the Fair Board bought auto racing back to the venue as part of their annual county fair. A more complete racing card returned in 2023 when promoter Brett Deyo partnered with the Fair Board.

== Events ==
The Brookfield Speedway offers one event each month from May through October. These occasions feature the Short Track Super Series Sportsman, 600 cc Modifieds, Pro Stocks, Four Cylinders, and Slingshots.
