= Dell Crill =

American racing driver (born 1939)

- Born: Delbert E. Crill; September 27, 1939 Booneville, New York, US
- Died: September 2, 1997 (aged 57)
- Retired: 1960
- Debut season: 1956

Modified racing career
- Car number: 10 pins
- Championships: 1
- Wins: 10

Delbert Crill (September 27, 1939 – September 2, 1997) was a pioneering American driver of dirt modified stock cars. Known for driving car number "10 pins" with 10 lit bowling pins on the roof, he was always a favorite of the younger race fans.

== Racing career ==
Crill began racing in 1956 in a 1939 Ford campaigned by Malcolm and Willard Ryder from Chaumont, New York . He was barely 17, but his mother signed a form falsifying his age so Crill could race.

Crill was one of the first to wear a shoulder harness as a winning advantage, finding that he would not need to expend as much energy holding himself in his seat on the turns. He dominated the 1960 season at Watertown Speedway, winning eight feature events including a streak of four in a row which was halted by a flat tire the fifth week. Crill was also crowned the 1960 track champion.

After the 1960 season ended, Crill fractured his pelvis in a work related injury and left the driver’s seat to raise a family and eventually become road supervisor for the village of Boonville, New York. The Ryder brothers put Paul Shirley behind the wheel the following year prior to exiting the sport.
