= LaFayette Speedway =

Defunct motorsport venue in LaFayette, New York

- Location: LaFayette, New York
- Coordinates: 42.9119°N 76.0838°W
- Owner: Jack Brandt
- Opened: 1948
- Closed: 1962

Oval
- Surface: Clay
- Length: .8 km (0.50 mi)
- Turns: 4

Inner Oval
- Length: .4 km (0.25 mi)

LaFayette Speedway was a one-half mile dirt oval raceway located in the Central New York Region of New York State. A quarter-mile oval was added in 1954 for motorcycle racing.

== Overview ==
LaFayette Speedway was opened by Jack Brandt in 1948 for motorcycle racing. The following year, the half-mile track was widened with a clay surface, and the corners banked in order to host auto racing. The venue went dormant in 1956, but reopened for a period late in the 1961 racing season.

Although the facility closed permanently after the 1961 season, Brandt continued to promote automobile and motorcycle racing at the Syracuse Fairgrounds.
