= Edgewood Speedway =

Defunct motorsport venue in Alexandria Bay, New York

Edgewood International Speedway
- Location: Alexandria Bay, New York
- Coordinates: 44.3301°N 75.9229°W
- Owner: George Clark, George Hebert
- Opened: 1951
- Closed: 1955
- Former names: Edgewood Speedway, Edgewood Park

Oval
- Surface: Dirt
- Length: .8 km (0.50 mi)
- Turns: 4

Edgewood Speedway, officially known as Edgewood International Speedway, was a 0.5-mile (0.80 km) dirt oval raceway located near the Canada–United States border in the Thousand Islands region of New York State.

== Overview ==
In the spring of 1950, Connecticut residents George Clark and George “Bud” Hebert purchased the Edgewood Park in Alexandria Bay, New York. The park was originally developed in the late 19th century as a private club with a summer bungalow colony and had its own horse track and private golf course.

On February 13, 1951, Hebert and Clark organized their first racing program, a winter stock car event. Tom Kennedy of Westdale, New York, won that first event, beating out 14 other drivers. The venue attracted drivers and fans from the Canadian side of the border, and the owners incorporated as the Edgewood International Speedway.

The promoters also took on operation of the nearby Watertown Speedway, establishing a joint championship in conjunction with the Adirondack Stock Car Club, an organization of local car owners and drivers organized by Al Mosher. The first club championship was claimed by Hall of Fame driver Don June, and in following years by, Andy Rae (1952), Bobby Miller (1953), Allen Shirley (1954).

In 1955, Hebert and Clark began construction of Adventure Town amusement park to replace the Edgewood racetrack.
