= Mid-State Speedway =

Motorsport venue in Morris, New York

- Location: Morris, New York
- Coordinates: 42.5481°N 75.2343°W
- Owner: Otsego County Fair Association
- Opened: 1949
- Closed: 1972
- Former names: Morris Speedway, Morris Fairgrounds

Oval
- Surface: Dirt
- Length: .8 km (0.50 mi)
- Turns: 4

Mid-State Speedway was a half-mile dirt oval raceway located on the Otsego County Fairgrounds in Central New York State.

== Overview ==
The newly reorganized Otsego County Fair Association took the helm in 1948 of the county fairgrounds in Morris, New York, and introduced auto racing to the former horse track the next year. From 1950 to 1952, the Eastern States Racing Club sponsored weekly stock car racing each summer. One NASCAR sanctioned modified race was held in 1956, but the track otherwise remained quiet from 1953 through mid-year 1957 when the Eastern Mutual Racing Club began promoting weekly events.

In 1962, the Fair Association turned track management over to the Mid-State Speedway Inc. while allocating concession operations to local non-profit organizations. The corporation also promoted races at the Brookfield Speedway on the Madison County Fairgrounds for a period of time. Within a handful of years, Mid-State had nearly 250 members.

The first ever Super DIRTcar Series event, then known as the Schaefer Circle of Champions, was hosted by the track on July 14, 1972, and was claimed by veteran driver Dick Hansen. However, weekly racing ended after the 1972 season, and except for some exhibition races by a regional antique stock car club, the track has remained dormant since.
