= Watertown Speedway =

Inactive racetrack in Watertown, New York

Coordinates: 43°59′15″N 75°55′44″W

- Start of a semi-final at Watertown Speedway May 1962
- Location: Watertown, New York
- Owner: City of Watertown New York
- Operator: Northern Stock Car Club
- Broke ground: 1843
- Opened: 1936
- Closed: 1974

Oval
- Surface: Clay
- Length: .8 km (0.50 mi)

Watertown Speedway was a 1/2 mile dirt oval raceway located at the Jefferson County fairgrounds in Watertown, New York.

== History ==
Auto racing was first presented at the former horse track located on Coffeen St in 1936 and again in 1940, when the Jefferson County Fair featured sprint car races sanctioned by the American Automobile Association. In 1949, the Fair introduced the International Midget Auto Racing Association, which returned for two additional shows the same year.

== Adirondack Stock Car Club ==
In 1951, Brewerton and Vernon Speedway promoter Al Richardson bought stock cars to Watertown for the first time, but by the end of that year, George Clark and George “Bud” Herbert, owners of the Edgewood Speedway in nearby Alexandria Bay took over promotion. Races at both tracks were sanctioned by the Adirondack Stock Car Club (ASCC), an organization of local car owners and drivers organized by Al Mosher. Club champions were determined by combined points earned from both racetracks.

In 1955, Herbert and Clark began construction of Adventure Town amusement park to replace the Edgewood racetrack. The ASCC continued plans to race at the Watertown Fairgrounds track in 1955, and Tony Costanzo took over as race promotor. Unfortunately, low attendance and financial difficulties resulted in the season being cancelled after only 7 events.

ASCC champions were Don June (1951), Andy Rae (1952), Bobby Miller (1953), Allen Shirley (1954), and Tiny Benson (1955). Benson made six appearances in the NASCAR Grand National Series (predecessor of the NASCAR Cup Division) from 1958 to 1959.

== Northern Stock Car Club ==
In 1955 Howard Rowe and Douglas Atkinson promoted the Star-Lit Park Speedway, a mile and a half European style dirt road course that was built by Fred Kleemeier on outer Washington Street in Watertown, NY. It hosted only one event in 1955, headlined by the "new cars" (less than three years old) from the Buffalo, New York, based Circuit of Speed, Inc. The facility closed because of severe dust problems. The following year, Rowe and Atkinson turned their efforts toward racing at the county fairgrounds.

In the book The Legends of Watertown Speedway, author David Stoodley writes: "In January 1956, several prominent Watertown area enthusiasts decided that something should be done about forming an organization to promote the return of stock car racing to Watertown and the north country. In a meeting held on March at the Watertown YMCA, seventeen men gathered and successfully organized the Northern Stock Car Club (NSCC). Officers elected were Douglas Atkinson, president; Howard Rowe, secretary/treasurer and Lloyd Smith, Austin Kilburn and Carl Walts as vice-presidents.

At a later meeting, according to Stoodley, the NSCC became a corporation. Stoodley noted that in April 1956 the NCSS signed a lease with the City of Watertown for $101.50 per week for use of the Jefferson County Fairgrounds track. The first race at the speedway was held on Sunday afternoon on May 15. The races were switched to Saturday night by the end of June. The speedway continued in operation for two decades.

Because of its close proximity to the Canada–US border, many drivers competed at the Kingston Speedway on Friday nights. The same rule book was used by both racetracks.

Track Champions were George Mahaffy, Bob Zeigler (3), Dutt Yanni, Dell Crill, Dick May, Frank André (2), Neal Tooley, Fred Gibson, Tony Blake, Chubby LeRoux (2), Gary Reddick (2), Guy Robinson (2), and Bud Hinman. Zeigler, May, André, Reddick and Robinson along with ASCC champion Don June have all been inducted into the Northeast Dirt Modified Hall of Fame. André, Gibson and Blake were inducted into the Kingston-District Sports Hall of Fame. Yanni was inducted into the Oswego Speedway Hall of Fame.

May went on to compete in 185 races in the NASCAR Cup division between 1967 and 1985. May’s car owner and crew then began to mentor a new driver, Bob McCreadie, who went on to be inducted into the Lowe's Motor Speedway Walk of Fame, the Northeast Dirt Modified Hall of Fame, and the Eastern Motorsport Press Association Hall of Fame. McCreadie is the father of former NASCAR driver and current World of Outlaws and Lucas Oil Late model driver Tim McCreadie.

A 6 cylinder Late Model Division was started in 1965. Division champions were Jim Armstrong, Charlie Baker, Dick Lappan, Dave Clark, Ally Amell, Gordon Dobbins (2), Jim Clark, Bill Eisele, and Jeff Walts.

Through the 1960s, Rowe and Atkinson joined race director Ira Vail in promoting the New York State Fair Championship.

By the spring of 1975, racing operations had moved to the Can-Am Speedway in La Fargeville. Rowe and Atkinson along with fellow area promoters Tom Coughlin, and Bob Thurston were honored in 1996 by the Northeast Dirt Modified Hall of Fame for their contributions.
