= Kingston Speedway =

Motorsport venue in Kingston, Ontario Canada

- Location: Kingston, Ontario Canada
- Coordinates: 44.2828°N 76.4924°W
- Opened: 1952
- Closed: 1976

Oval
- Surface: Clay
- Length: .4 km (0.25 mi)
- Turns: 4
- Banking: Semi-banked
- Turns: 4

Kingston Speedway was a quarter-mile dirt oval raceway located in the Thousand Islands region of Ontario, Canada.

== Overview ==
In 1951 Rod Cutway organized a group of racing enthusiasts and roughed-out a version of a three-eighths-mile racetrack on his father-in-law's land. Final construction took place in the spring of 1952 with Tony Blake claiming the first official feature win on June 28, 1952. Blake went on to capture six track championships.

Lawrence Craven began a decade long stretch promoting the facility in 1955, during which he added banking and shortened the track to a quarter-mile. Multi-time track champion Fred Gibson then took over operations along with his brother Bud. In 1967, Bud Gibson bought out his brother and also announced jointly with the Watertown Speedway a rule change to allow overhead valve V8 engines and to increase engine displacement from 250 to 310 cubic inches.

The facility continued operations with several other promoters, including Fred Gibson's return from 1971 to 1973, closing after the 1976 season when the property was sold to a neighboring limestone quarry.

== Track Champions ==
Year	Modified	Late Model	Mini Stock
1976	Doug Carlyle	Jack Theoret	Ken Pugh
1975	Ovide Doiron	Jack Theoret	John Kuipers
1974	Norm Davey	Dan Corcoran	Denzil Coughlin
1973	Denzil Billings	Danny Reid	Denzil Coughlin
1972	Walter Pennock		Al Bissette
1971	Walter Pennock		
1970	Tony Blake		
1969	Tony Blake		
1968	Barry Poitras		
1967	Fred Gibson		
1966	Gary Reddick		
1965	Fred Gibson		
1964	Tony Blake		
1963	Tony Blake		
1962	Fred Gibson		
1961	Woody Van Order		
1960	Tony Blake		
1959	Woody Van Order		
1958	Woody Van Order		
1957	Woody Van Order		
1956	Tony Blake		
1955	Woody Van Order		
1954			
1953	Ernie Lindsay		
1952	Andy Rae		
