= Devil's Bowl Speedway =

- Location: 2743 Rt 22A West Haven, VT 05743
- Coordinates: 43°40′4″N 73°17′35″W
- Owner: Mike & Alayne Bruno
- Operator: Mike & Alayne Bruno
- Opened: 1967
- Former names: West Haven Speedway (1979-1981) when track promotions changed temporarily
- Major events: "Vermont 200" Weekend, STSS "Slate Valley 50," "Battle at the Bowl" Big Block/Small Block Modified Challenge.

Clay oval
- Length: 0.80 km (1/2 mi)
- Banking: Progressive 6-12 degrees in corners

Devil's Bowl Speedway is a half-mile auto racing track in West Haven, Vermont. It is the longest length of the three remaining tracks in Vermont. It currently hosts races in the 358 Modified division, Sportsman Modified division, the Limited Sportsman Modified division, the Novice Sportsman Modified division, the Crown Vic division, the Mini Stock division, and the 500cc Mini Sprint division. Touring series events include the Sprint Cars of New England (SCoNE), and the Short Track Super Series (STSS). Major special events include the Vermont 200 Weekend, the "Northeast Crate Nationals," and the Slate Valley 50.

== History ==
The track was opened in 1967 and promoted by Charles "C.J." Richards. Richards was well known for his close affiliation with other tracks, Fairmont Raceway, Albany-Saratoga Speedway, and Airborne Park Speedway. Richards sanctioned racing though his Champlain Valley Racing Association (CVRA). The track opened with a clay surface before being paved in 1971. Clay returned in 1975, was repaved in 2010, and was converted back to a clay dirt track in 2018.

== Recent ==
Mike and Alayne Bruno purchased Devil's Bowl Speedway from Richards in November 2011. The track continued to host the normal races and the series that come to the venue. The track was previously the only NASCAR sanctioned track in the state, with Modified and Late Model races in the Whelen All-American Series.

In 2014, a 3/10-mile dirt track was constructed in the infield of the asphalt half mile race track.

In 2018 the asphalt track was covered with clay and now operates as 1/2 mile dirt track running on Saturday nights in the Summer.

== See also ==
- Thunder Road International Speedbowl
- American Canadian Tour
- Whelen All-American Series
