= Fort Covington International Speedway =

Defunct motorsport venue in Fort Covington, New York

- Location: Fort Covington, New York
- Coordinates: 44.9892°N 74.5063°W
- Owner: Pat Hotte Enterprises
- Opened: 1953
- Closed: 1975

Oval
- Surface: Clay
- Length: .8 km (0.50 mi)
- Turns: 4
- Banking: Semi-banked

Fort Covington International Speedway was a 0.5-mile (0.80 km) dirt oval raceway located just 1.5 miles from the Canada–United States border with New York State and 3.5 miles from the Mohawk Nation at Akwesasne territory.

== Overview ==
In spring of 1953, R. S. Lomber, Dennis Mahoney, and Lawrence VerSchneider began transforming an abandoned fairgrounds oval into a stock car racing facility. The track opened on August 8, 1953, to about 30 competitors and a standing room only crowd.

In 1956, driver Bud Reid was involved in a serious on track incident, and the heroic actions of fellow driver Rod Ritchie led to Ritchie receiving NASCAR's "John Naughton Memorial Sportsmanship Trophy".

In 1966, ownership transferred to Pat Hotte. Hotte was also the promoter of the Maxwell Fairgrounds and Iroquois Speedway in Ontario, Canada, and later added the Saranac Lake Speedway in New York and Cornwall Motor Speedway in Ontario, Canada, to his portfolio.

Operations ceased after the 1974 racing season due to Hotte's illness and subsequent passing.
