= Evans Mills Raceway Park =

Motorsport venue in Evans Mills, New York

- Location: Evans Mills, New York
- Coordinates: 44.0803°N 75.8072°W
- Owner: Lee and Peggy Gill
- Broke ground: 1965
- Opened: 1967
- Former names: Evans Mills Speedway; Evans Mills Motorsport Park; Evans Mills Raceway; Evans Mills International Speedway; Thunder Alley Speedpark
- Website: evansmillsracewaypark.com

Oval
- Surface: Asphalt
- Length: .6 km (.375 miles)
- Turns: 4

Kartway
- Surface: Asphalt
- Length: .2 km (.125 miles)
- Turns: 4

Evans Mills Raceway Park is a 3/8-mile asphalt oval raceway located on U.S. Route 11 just outside of Evans Mills, New York.

== History ==
Midway through 1965 hall of fame racer Bob Zeigler sold his stock car, purchased land, formed a corporation with his brother Dick and cousin Karl John, and began building a racetrack in Evans Mills, New York.

The facility opened in 1967 as the Evans Mills Speedway with a dirt surface, but was paved to start the 1968 racing season. The Zeiglers retired from racing in 1979, after which several different promotors were involved with the site. Lee and Peggy Gill purchased the former Evans Mills Speedway in December 2018 and rebranded it as the Evans Mills Raceway Park.

== Facilities ==
The raceway tower complex hosts 54 hospitality suites and the grandstand offers a seating capacity of over 3,000. The complex also includes an oval go-kart track which incorporates the front stretch of the bigger oval.

Including the original 1968 paving, the oval's surface has been changed five times. In 1981 the track was resurfaced with clay, and a 1995 asphalt re-pavement remained until 2003. The oval was returned to asphalt in 2010.

== Events ==
The Evans Mills Raceway Park hosts auto racing on Saturday nights throughout the summer. There are five racing divisions —Modified, Pro Late Models, INEX Legends, Sport Compact, and 6-Cylinder Stinger. The facility also annually hosts the Northern Lights drive-through holiday display from Thanksgiving weekend through New Year's Day.
