= Albany-Saratoga Speedway =

American dirt race track

"The Great Race Place"
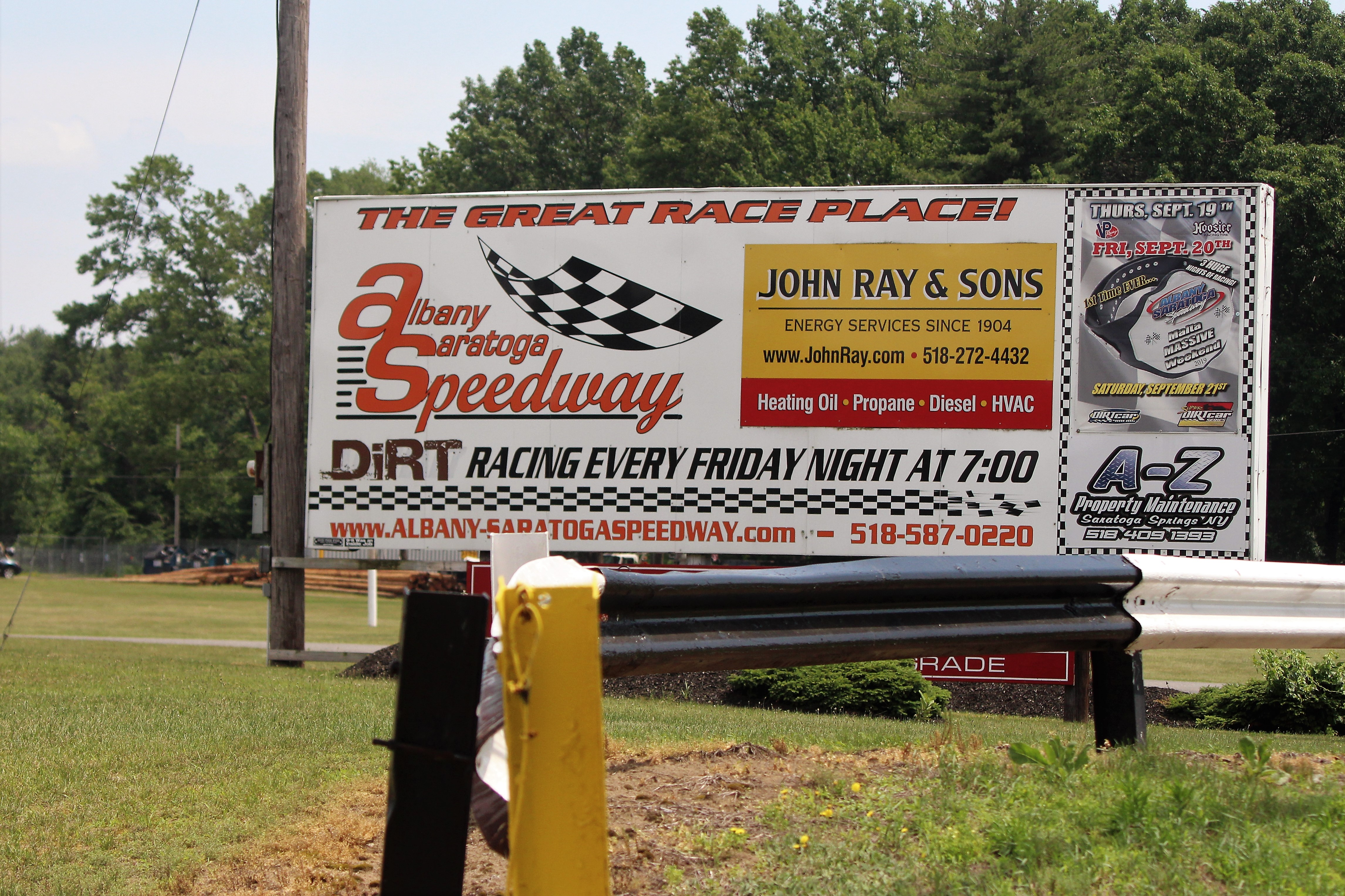
- Location: Malta, New York
- Coordinates: 42.9885°N 73.7821°W
- Owner: Howard Commander
- Operator: Lyle DeVore
- Opened: 1965

Oval
- Surface: Dirt
- Length: 0.56 km (0.35 mi)
- Turns: 4

Albany-Saratoga Speedway is a 0.36-mile dirt oval raceway located in the Capital Region of New York State.

== Overview ==
The speedway opened in 1965 by builder Joe Lesik as an asphalt oval. The track held NASCAR Cup Series races in 1970 and 1971 which were both won by Richard Petty.

From 1977 it was owned by the family of C. J. Richards, a founder of the Champlain Valley Racing Association, who covered the asphalt with dirt. In 2011 it was put up for sale and after leasing the facility for three seasons, it was purchased by the owners of Lebanon Valley Speedway in West Lebanon, New York.

== Events ==
The track features racing on Friday nights, with five different weekly racing divisions, including DIRTcar modifieds, DIRTcar sportsman, limited sportsman, pro stocks and street stocks and also four-cylinder racers.
