= Lebanon Valley Speedway =

Motorsport venue in West Lebanon, New York

- Location: West Lebanon, New York
- Coordinates: 42°29′26.47″N 73°29′12.65″W
- Owner: Howard Commander
- Address: 1746 US Route 20
- Opened: 1953
- Website: www.lebanonvalley.com

Oval
- Surface: Clay
- Length: .8 km (0.50 mi)
- Turns: 4
- Banking: High bank

Kart track
- Surface: Dirt
- Length: .2 km (0.12 mi)
- Turns: 4

Dragway
- Surface: Concrete-asphalt
- Length: .4 km (0.25 mi)

Lebanon Valley Speedway is a 1/2 mile high banked dirt oval raceway in West Lebanon, New York. The complex also includes Lebanon Valley Dragway, a quarter-mile dragway, as well as a go-kart track.

== History ==
The Lebanon Valley Speedway was built in 1953 by a Massachusetts group consisting of Edward Radke, Robert Scott and Harold Beitzel on land leased from the Lou Spanier family. In 1954, Spanier gained ownership of the facilities, and in 1963 added the dragstrip to the complex. Spanier served as promoter until 1970 when his nephew, Howard Commander took over the operations.

== Events ==
The Lebanon Valley Speedway hosts auto racing on Saturday nights throughout the summer. There are seven racing divisions—big block modifieds, small block modifieds; sportsman, prostock, limited sportsman; super stocks, and four-cylinder competition. The speedway also holds special events such as Monster trucks, as well as their 'Eve Of Destruction' which includes a school bus race, trailer race and demolition derby. In addition to traditional drag racing, the dragstrip presents "drifting" events on several days during the summer.
