= Syracuse Mile =

Horse and auto racetrack

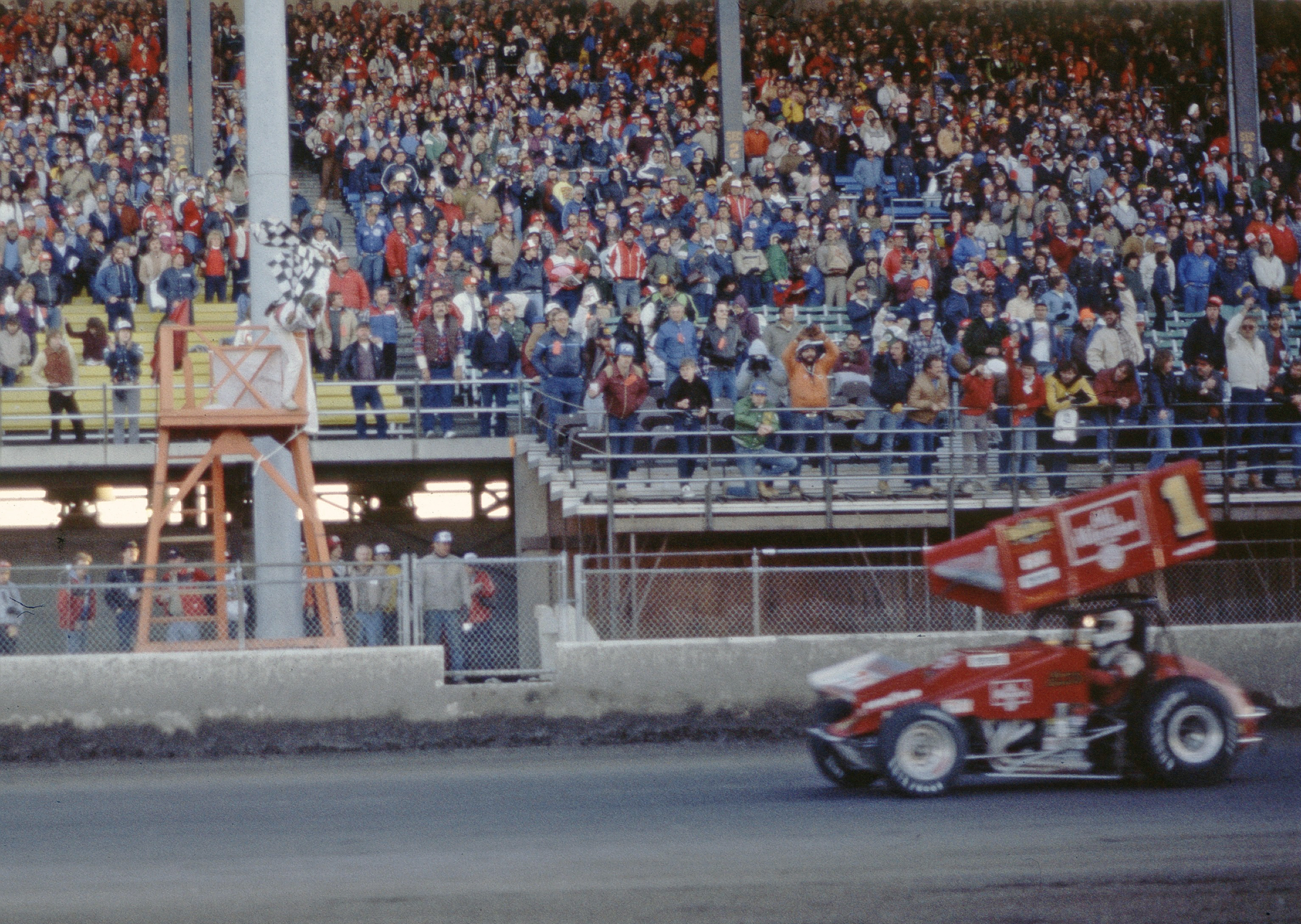
- Sammy Swindell takes the checkered flag at the 1984 Syracuse Dirt Nationals
- Location: New York State Fairgrounds, Syracuse, New York
- Opened: 1826 (harness); 1903 (automobile)
- Closed: 2015
- Major events: Super DIRT Week

Oval
- Surface: Dirt
- Length: 0.99 mi (1.6 km)
- Turns: 4

The Syracuse Mile was a 1-mile (1.6 km) dirt oval raceway located at the New York State Fairgrounds in Syracuse, New York. Originally built for harness racing in 1826, the first auto race was run in 1903, making it the second-oldest auto racing facility in United States history. The racetrack was also nicknamed "The Moody Mile" after driver Wes Moody turned a 100-mile-per-hour lap in 1970. The track and grandstands were torn down in 2016 by state government officials with the plan to modernize facilities.

== Harness racing ==
The Syracuse Mile hosted harness racing from its opening until 2005. The Hambletonian Stakes were held from 1926 through 1929. In the early 1970s, a new 16,000-seat grandstand was built as part of an unsuccessful attempt to bring back the Hambletonian Stakes.

== Auto racing ==
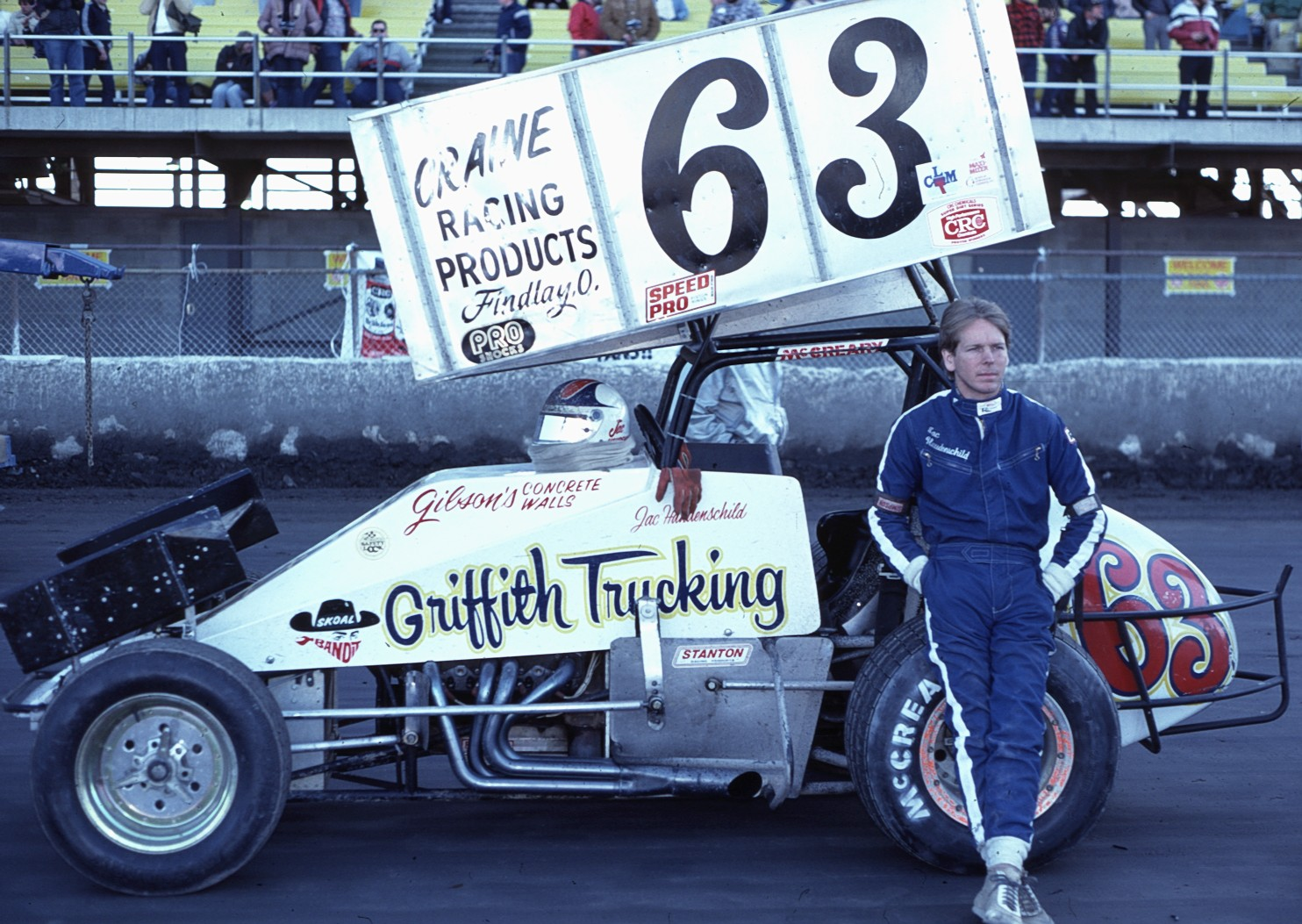
Jac Haudenschild standing beside his sprint car at Syracuse

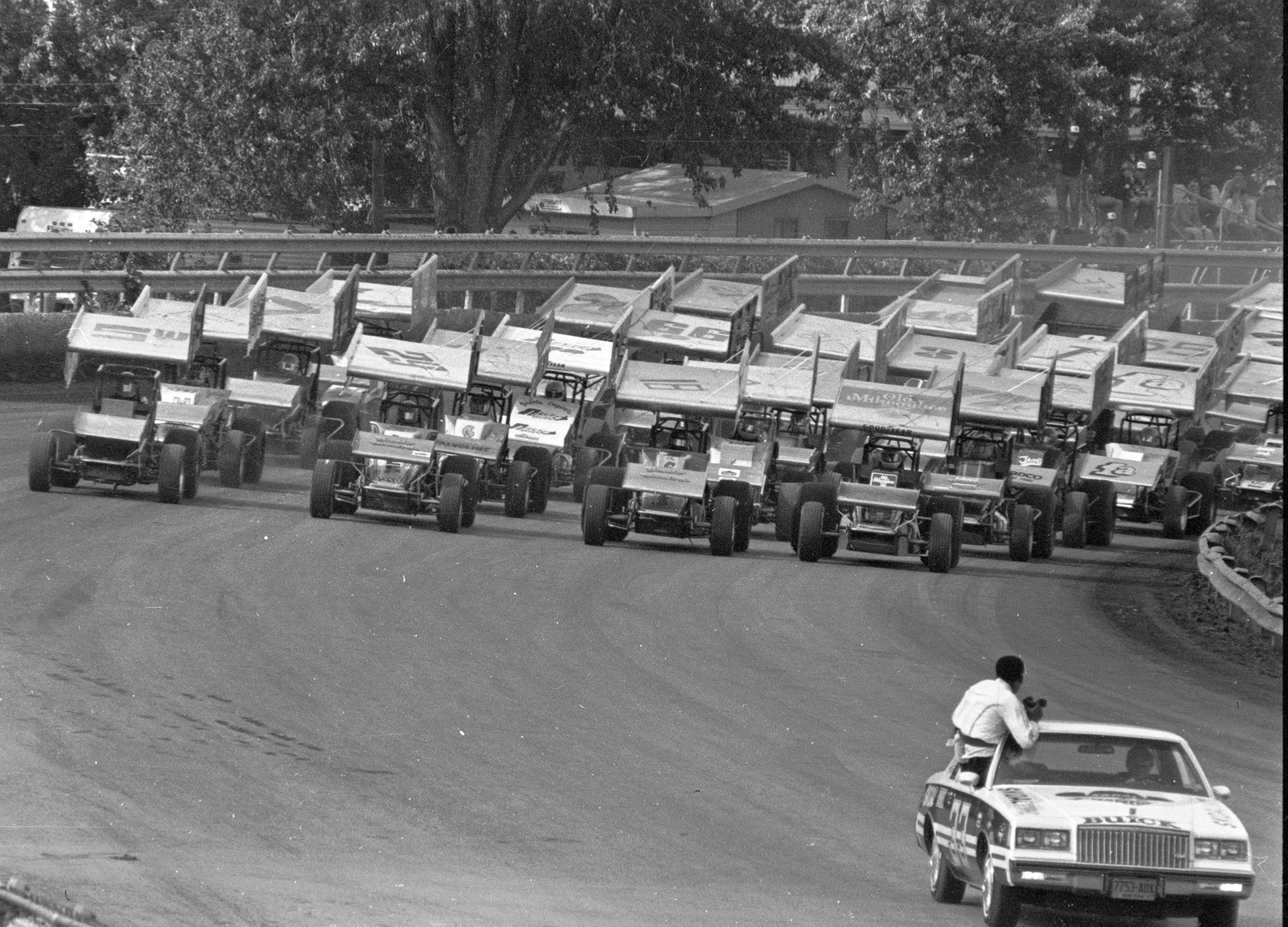
Sprint cars at Super Dirt Week in 1983

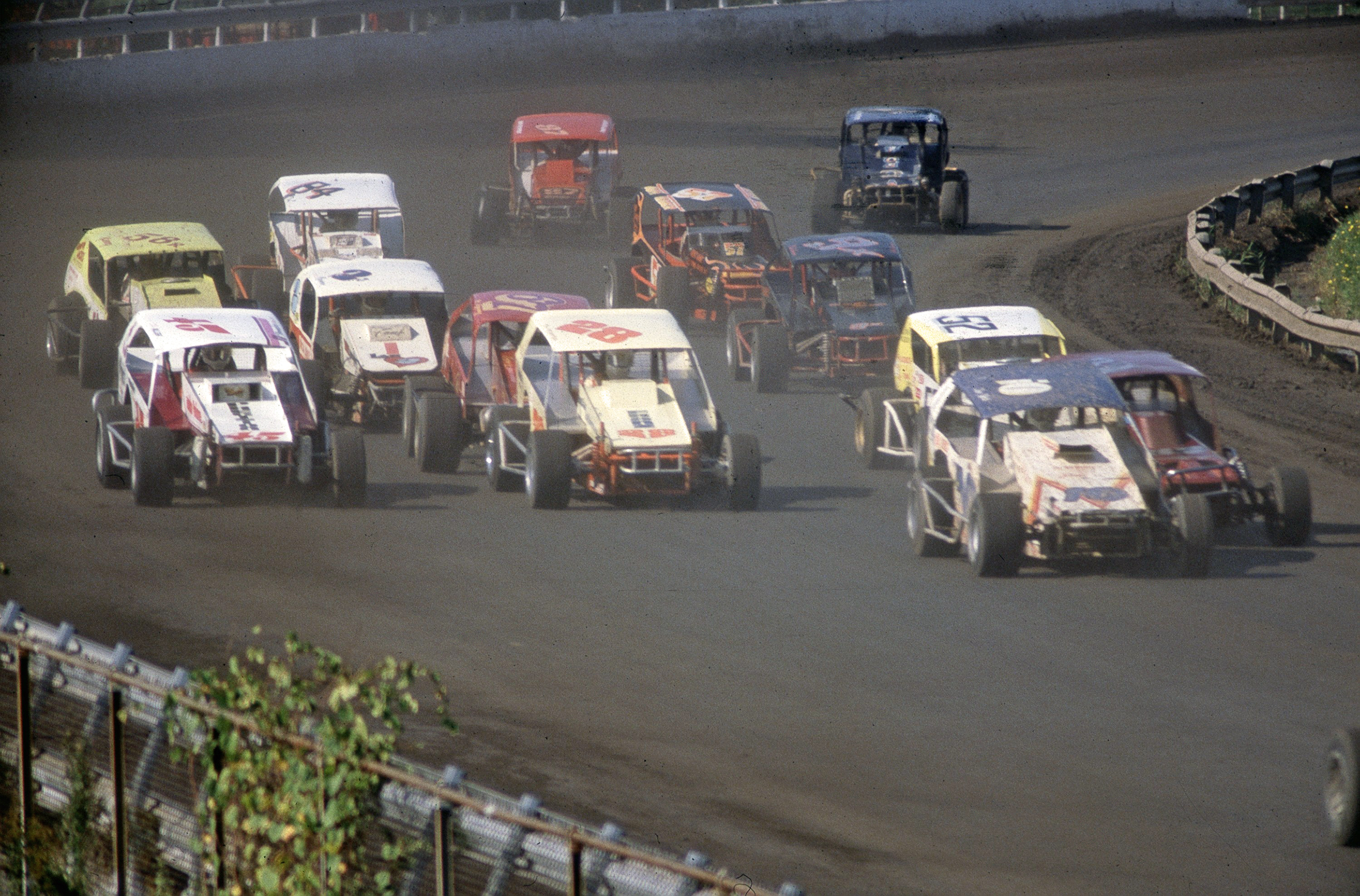
Big Block Modifieds during the 1983 Super Dirt Week

In 1900, a $10,000 bid was awarded to build a dirt track suitable for auto racing on the perimeter of the harness track.

The first auto race at the track was held in 1903, and won by Barney Oldfield in his "Baby Bullet". Oldfield averaged more than 60 mph in a lap around the mile. Syracuse was one of the several tracks one mile in length that made up the AAA national championship. From 1925 to 1971 the Fairgrounds Board contracted with former Indianapolis driver Ira Vail to promote auto racing. With Vail's promotion, drivers such as Mario Andretti, A.J. Foyt and Al Unser competed for wins during one of the Indianapolis 500's golden era's, putting the Syracuse Mile in the national spotlight.

On Labor Day 1949 the sportsman modified stock cars took to the track. The New York State Fair Championship then became a Labor Day a tradition that lasted until 2002. Floyd, New York driver Cliff Kotary reigned as State Fair Champion for six straight years (1960-1965).

In 1955 the first of three races for what is now referred to as the NASCAR Cup Series were featured at the fairgrounds. Tim Flock, Buck Baker and Gwyn Staley were victorious in the three events held from 55-57. NASCAR's Convertible Stock Series also competed in 56 and 57. Curtis Turner and Possum Jones were victorious in those events.

In 1972, Glenn Donnelly began promoting races at the fairgrounds adding to the Labor Day event with races on the Fourth of July and Columbus Day weekend. The October race became Super DIRT Week, and continued at the Fairgrounds until 2015. Buzzie Reutimann beat NASCAR Hall of Famer Jerry Cook for the 1972 Championship. Brett Hearn of Kinnelon, New Jersey, became the all-time win leader at the "Moody Mile," after claiming 6 Super Dirt Week main event victories and 6 "358 Modified" triumphs, the final coming in 2014.

=== New York State Fair Championship Race ===
Year	Champion	Year	Champion	Year	Champion
1949	Ray Hill	1967	Dutch Hoag	1985	Ken Brenn Jr.
1950	no race	1968	Dutch Hoag	1986	Jack Johnson
1951	Dick Eagan	1969	Don Diffendorf	1987	Kenny Tremont Jr.
1952	Don Henderberg	1970	Jack Murphy	1988	Danny Johnson
1953	Bill Lang	1971	Don Diffendorf	1989	Jimmy Horton
1954	Dutt Yanni^{†}, George Bowers^{‡}	1972	Kenny Brightbill	1990	Eddie Marshall
1955	Ralph Smith	1973	Ernie Marshall	1991	Doug Hoffman
1956	Nolan Swift	1974	Gerald Chamberlain	1992	Brett Hearn
1957	no race	1975	Merv Treichler	1993	Doug Hoffman
1958	Nolan Swift	1976	Wayne Reutimann	1994	Toby Tobias Jr.
1959	Jack Murphy^{†}, Billy Rafter^{‡}	1977	Toby Tobias	1995	Joe Plazek
1960	Cliff Kotary	1978	Billy Osmun	1996	Joe Plazek
1961	Cliff Kotary	1979	Billy Osmun	1997	Joe Plazek
1962	Cliff Kotary	1980	Billy Osmun	1998	Pat Ward
1963	Cliff Kotary	1981	Merv Treichler	1999	Eddie Marshall
1964	Cliff Kotary	1982	Dickie Larkin	2000	Jack Johnson
1965	Cliff Kotary	1983	Merv Treichler	2001	Brett Hearn
1966	Larry Nye	1984	Jack Johnson	2002	Danny Johnson
Separate races for †Empire State Champion and ‡Eastern States Champion					

=== Super Dirt Week Champions ===
The first event was scheduled over three days, from September 29, through October 1, 1972. Inspection and qualifying races were conducted on Friday and Saturday, and the Championship race was held on Sunday. The Syracuse Mile remained the featured racetrack until 2015.

== Motorcycle racing ==
In 1904, motorcycle maker and racer Glenn Curtiss, from Hammondsport, New York, raced a twin-cylinder Curtiss around The Mile in 61 seconds, just missing the then mythical mile a minute. American Motorcyclist Association (AMA) events continued until 1939 and were then revived for a short period after World War II. After a 20-year hiatus, motorcycles returned to the venue in 1974 and continued on until 1993. The AMA Nationals returned again in 2005 for the final time.

== Closure ==
In 2015, New York Governor Andrew Cuomo announced a sweeping redesign of the fairgrounds that included taking out what was the 16,000-seat grandstand and mile-long dirt track. The last stock car race was held that year on Columbus day weekend. The Super DIRT Week events were moved to a temporary dirt track at Oswego Speedway until construction of a new venue was completed. The proposed CNYRP or Central New York Raceway Park was cancelled and the property was repurposed when Micron Technology agreed in October 2022 to invest up to $100 billion to build a mega-complex of chip manufacturing plants in Syracuse's northern suburbs. The race remains at Oswego Speedway today.

== See also ==
Empire Expo Center
New York State Fair
