= 2015 World of Outlaws Sprint Car Series =

The 2015 World of Outlaws Sprint Car Series season was the 37th season of the winged sprint car series in North America. The season began with the DIRTcar Nationals at Volusia Speedway Park on February 13, and ended with the Bad Boy Buggies World of Outlaws World Finals at The Dirt Track at Charlotte on November 8. Donny Schatz entered the season as the defending series champion, and clinched the 2015 championship, his seventh overall, after a second-place finish in the National Open at Williams Grove Speedway on October 4.

== Full-time teams and drivers ==
No.	Driver	Hometown	Team
1a	Jacob Allen	Hanover, Pennsylvania	Shark Racing
1s	Logan Schuchart	Hanover, Pennsylvania	Shark Racing
2	Shane Stewart	Bixby, Oklahoma	Larson Marks Racing
7	Craig Dollansky	Elk River, Minnesota	Destiny Motorsports
7	David Gravel	Watertown, Connecticut	Destiny Motorsports
7s	Jason Sides	Bartlett, Tennessee	Sides Motorsports
9	Daryn Pittman	Owasso, Oklahoma	Kasey Kahne Racing with Mike Curb
11k	Kraig Kinser	Bloomington, Indiana	Steve Kinser Racing
11k	Mikey Kuemper	Phoenix, Arizona	Steve Kinser Racing
15	Donny Schatz	Minot, North Dakota	Tony Stewart/Curb-Agajanian Racing
29	Kerry Madsen	St. Marys, New South Wales	Keneric Racing
41	Jason Johnson	Eunice, Louisiana	Jason Johnson Racing
41	Jason Meyers	Clovis, California	Jason Johnson Racing
41	Jamie Veal	Warrnambool, Victoria	Jason Johnson Racing
41	Sammy Swindell	Germantown, Tennessee	Jason Johnson Racing
49	Brad Sweet	Grass Valley, California	Kasey Kahne Racing with Mike Curb
51	Paul McMahan	Elk Grove, California	CJB Motorsports
71m	Joey Saldana	Brownsburg, Indiana	Motter Motorsports
83	David Gravel	Watertown, Connecticut	Roth Motorsports
83	Kyle Hirst	Paradise, California	Roth Motorsports
83	Craig Dollansky	Elk River, Minnesota	Roth Motorsports

== Schedule and results ==
No.	Date	Event	Track/Location	Winning driver	Winning team	Hard Charger award	B-Main winner	Dash winner	Fastest qualifier
1	February 13	DIRTcar Nationals	Volusia Speedway Park, Barberville, Florida	Daryn Pittman	Kasey Kahne Racing with Mike Curb	David Gravel	Shane Stewart	Greg Hodnett	Kerry Madsen
2	February 14	DIRTcar Nationals	Volusia Speedway Park, Barberville, Florida	Donny Schatz	Tony Stewart/Curb-Agajanian Racing	Chad Kemenah	Logan Schuchart	Steve Kinser	Kery Madsen
3	February 15	DIRTcar Nationals	Volusia Speedway Park, Barberville, Florida	Brad Sweet	Kasey Kahne Racing with Mike Curb	Greg Hodnett	Cody Darrah	Paul McMahan	Kerry Madsen
4	March 4	FVP Outlaw Showdown	The Dirt Track at Las Vegas, Las Vegas, Nevada	Shane Stewart	Larson Marks Racing	Dominic Scelzi	Carson Macedo	Brian Brown	Paul McMahan
5	March 5	FVP Outlaw Showdown	The Dirt Track at Las Vegas, Las Vegas, Nevada	Terry McCarl	TMAC Motorsports	Kraig Kinser	Kraig Kinser	Terry McCarl	Joey Saldana
6	March 7	NAPA Wildcat Shootout presented by RideNow Powersports	USA Raceway, Tucson, Arizona	Brian Brown	Brian Brown Racing	Daryn Pittman	Dusty Zomer	Brad Sweet	Danny Lasoski
7	March 13		Thunderbowl Raceway, Tulare, California	Tim Kaeding	Roth Motorsports	Jason Sides	Willie Croft	Joey Saldana	Brad Sweet
8	March 14		Thunderbowl Raceway, Tulare, California	Rico Abreu	Rico Abreu Racing	Bud Kaeding	Shane Golobic	Brad Sweet	Shane Stewart
9	March 21	FVP Western Spring Shootout	Stockton Dirt Track, Stockton, California	Donny Schatz	Tony Stewart/Curb-Agajanian Racing	Brad Sweet	Logan Schuchart	Paul McMahan	Donny Schatz
10	March 22	FVP Western Spring Shootout	Stockton Dirt Track, Stockton, California	Rico Abreu	Rico Abreu Racing	Tim Kaeding	Shane Stewart	Daryn Pittman	Rico Abreu
11	March 28	Mini Gold Cup	Silver Dollar Speedway, Chico, California	Donny Schatz	Tony Stewart/Curb-Agajanian Racing	Jason Johnson	Shane Stewart	Donny Schatz	Kerry Madsen
12	March 29		Antioch Speedway, Antioch, California	Daryn Pittman	Kasey Kahne Racing with Mike Curb	Jason Statler	Bryan Clauson	Paul McMahan	Brad Sweet
13	April 8	Brad Sweet Presents Placerville Short Track Outlaw Showdown	Placerville Speedway, Placerville, California	Donny Schatz	Tony Stewart/Curb-Agajanian Racing	Kerry Madsen	Paul McMahan	Jason Sides	Jonathan Allard
14	April 11	Wine Country Outlaw Showdown	Calistoga Speedway, Calistoga, California	Brad Sweet	Kasey Kahne Racing with Mike Curb	Kevin Swindell	Cody Darrah	Joey Saldana	Joey Saldana
15	April 12	Wine Country Outlaw Showdown	Calistoga Speedway, Calistoga, California	Donny Schatz	Tony Stewart/Curb-Agajanian Racing	Logan Schuchart	Kyle Hirst	Donny Schatz	David Gravel
16	April 17		Kings Speedway, Hanford, California	Shane Stewart	Larson Marks Racing	Donny Schatz	Mitchell Faccinto	Bud Kaeding	Paul McMahan
17	April 18	SoCal Showdown	Perris Auto Speedway, Perris, California	Paul McMahan	CJB Motorsports	Jason Meyers	-	Donny Schatz	Shane Stewart
≠	April 25	Texas Outlaw Nationals	Devil's Bowl Speedway, Mesquite, Texas	Race cancelled due to inclement weather.					
18	April 26	Texas Outlaw Nationals	Devil's Bowl Speedway, Mesquite, Texas	Donny Schatz	Tony Stewart/Curb-Agajanian Racing	Brad Sweet	Jamie Veal	Donny Schatz	Shane Stewart
19	May 1		Salina Highbanks Speedway, Salina, Oklahoma	Shane Stewart	Larson Marks Racing	Logan Schuchart	Paul McMahan	Brad Sweet	Paul McMahan
20	May 2	Spring Classic	Federated Auto Parts Raceway at I-55, Pevely, Missouri	Christopher Bell	Keith Kunz Motorsports	Joey Saldnana	Hunter Schuerenberg	Rico Abreu	Kraig Kinser
21	May 3		Tri-State Speedway, Haubstadt, Indiana	Paul McMahan	CJB Motorsports	Donny Schatz	Shane Stewart	Joey Saldana	Shane Stewart
22	May 8		Eldora Speedway, Rossburg, Ohio	Donny Schatz	Tony Stewart/Curb-Agajanian Racing	Brad Sweet	Christopher Bell	Kerry Madsen	Paul McMahan
23	May 9		Eldora Speedway, Rossburg, Ohio	Donny Schatz	Tony Stewart/Curb-Agajanian Racing	Brad Sweet	Craig Dollansky	Donny Schatz	Rico Abreu
24	May 13	Gettysburg Clash	Lincoln Speedway, Abbottstown, Pennsylvania	Greg Hodnett	Heffner Racing	Donny Schatz	Lance Dewease	Greg Hodnett	Greg Hodnett
25	May 15	Morgan Cup	Williams Grove Speedway, Mechanicsburg, Pennsylvania	Donny Schatz	Tony Stewart/Curb-Agajanian Racing	Cody Darrah	Sheldon Haudenschild	Donny Schatz	Aaron Ott
≠	May 19	Morgan Cup	Williams Grove Speedway, Mechanicsburg, Pennsylvania	Race cancelled due to inclement weather.					
26	May 17	Empire State Challenge	Weedsport Speedway, Weedsport, New York	Donny Schatz	Tony Stewart/Curb-Agajanian Racing	Shane Stewart	Brent Marks	Donny Schatz	Greg Hodnett
27	May 19	Jersey Outlaw Classic	New Egypt Speedway, New Egypt, New Jersey	Daryn Pittman	Kasey Kahne Racing with Mike Curb	Paul McMahan	Kyle Reinhardt	Daryn Pittman	Joey Saldana
28	May 25	Circle K/NOS Energy Drink Outlaw Showdown	The Dirt Track at Charlotte, Concord, North Carolina	Donny Schatz	Tony Stewart/Curb-Agajanian Racing	Jacob Allen	-	Donny Schatz	Daryn Pittman
29	May 29	Kistler Engines Classic	Attica Raceway Park, Attica, Ohio	Dale Blaney	Big Game Motorsports	James McFadden	DJ Foos	Cody Darrah	Dale Blaney
30	June 3		Kokomo Speedway, Kokomo, Indiana	Joey Saldana	Motter Motorsports	James McFadden	Cody Darrah	Joey Saldana	Rico Abreu
31	June 5	NAPA Auto Parts Outlaw Showdown	I-80 Speedway, Greenwood, Nebraska	Danny Lasoski	Big Game Motorsports	Donny Schatz	Seth Brahmer	Danny Lasoski	Joey Saldana
32	June 12		Crawford County Speedway, Denison, Iowa	Shane Stewart	Larson Marks Racing	Donny Schatz	Dakota Hendrickson	Kerry Madsen	Joey Saldana
33	June 13	Mediacom Shootout	Knoxville Raceway, Knoxville, Iowa	Donny Schatz	Tony Stewart/Curb-Agajanian Racing	Tim Kaeding	Logan Schuchart	Donny Schatz	Kerry Madsen
33	June 13	Mediacom Shootout	Knoxville Raceway, Knoxville, Iowa	Donny Schatz	Tony Stewart/Curb-Agajanian Racing	Tim Kaeding	Joey Saldana	Donny Schatz	Kerry Madsen
34	June 14		Huset's Speedway, Brandon, South Dakota	Donny Schatz	Tony Stewart/Curb-Agajanian Racing	Terry McCarl	Logan Schuchart	Paul McMahan	Donny Schatz
35	June 17		Granite City Speedway, Sauk Rapids, Minnesota	Donny Schatz	Tony Stewart/Curb-Agajanian Racing	Tim Kaeding	Jordan Adams	Danny Lasoski	Sammy Swindell
36	June 19	First Leg of the Northern Tour	River Cities Speedway, Grand Forks, North Dakota	Donny Schatz	Tony Stewart/Curb-Agajanian Racing	Mark Dobmeier	Tim Kaeding	Dusty Zomer	Joey Saldana
37	June 20	Iverson Huron presents The Greatest Show on Dirt	Dakota State Fair Speedway, Huron, South Dakota	Donny Schatz	Tony Stewart/Curb-Agajanian Racing	Shane Stewart	Ryan Bickett	Daryn Pittman	Joey Saldana
38	June 24	NAPA Auto Parts Rumble in Michigan	I-96 Speedway, Lake Odessa, Michigan	Brad Sweet	Kasey Kahne Racing with Mike Curb	Logan Schuchart	Gary Taylor	Steve Kinser	Jason Sides
≠	June 26		34 Raceway, Burlington, Iowa	Race cancelled due to inclement weather.					
39	June 27	Jim "JB" Boyd Memorial presented by Karavan Trailers	Beaver Dam Raceway, Beaver Dam, Wisconsin	Donny Schatz	Tony Stewart/Curb-Agajanian Racing	Donny Schatz	Kraig Kinser	Kerry Madsen	Joey Saldana
40	July 1	O'Reilly Auto Parts presents the Outlaws at Lakeside	Lakeside Speedway, Kansas City, Kansas	Donny Schatz	Tony Stewart/Curb-Agajanian Racing	Brad Sweet	-	David Gravel	Jason Sides
41	July 3	Boot Hill Showdown	Dodge City Raceway Park, Dodge City, Kansas	Jason Sides	Sides Motorsports	Joey Saldana	-	David Gravel	Logan Schuchart
42	July 4	Boot Hill Showdown	Dodge City Raceway Park, Dodge City, Kansas	Donny Schatz	Tony Stewart/Curb-Agajanian Racing	Kevin Swindell	-	Jason Sides	Joey Saldana
43	July 11	Cedar Lake Outlaw Sprint Car Showdown	Cedar Lake Speedway, New Richmond, Wisconsin	Donny Schatz	Tony Stewart/Curb-Agajanian Racing	Jason Sides	Craig Dollansky	Daryn Pittman	Joey Saldana
44	July 12	Cedar Lake Outlaw Sprint Car Showdown	Cedar Lake Speedway, New Richmond, Wisconsin	Joey Saldana	Motter Motorsports	Brad Sweet	Paige Polyak	Donny Schatz	Jamie Veal
≠	July 16	Brad Doty Classic	Limaland Motorsports Park, Lima, Ohio	Race cancelled due to inclement weather.					
45	July 18	Knight Before the Kings Royal	Eldora Speedway, Rossburg, Ohio	Shane Stewart	Larson Marks Racing	Jason Sides	Bryan Clauson	Shane Stewart	Jacob Allen
45	July 18	Knight Before the Kings Royal	Eldora Speedway, Rossburg, Ohio	Shane Stewart	Larson Marks Racing	Jason Sides	Joey Saldana	Shane Stewart	Joey Saldana
46	July 19	Kings Royal	Eldora Speedway, Rossburg, Ohio	Shane Stewart	Larson Marks Racing	Jac Haudenschild	David Gravel	-	Bryan Clauson
47	July 21	Don Martin Memorial Silver Cup Twins	Lernerville Speedway, Sarver, Pennsylvania	Dale Blaney	Big Game Motorsports	Jason Sides	Lucas Wolfe	Ed Lynch Jr.	Dave Blaney
47	July 21	Don Martin Memorial Silver Cup Twins	Lernerville Speedway, Sarver, Pennsylvania	Dale Blaney	Big Game Motorsports	Jason Sides	Cole Duncan	Ed Lynch Jr.	Sheldon Haudenschild
≈	July 21	Don Martin Memorial Silver Cup Twins	Lernerville Speedway, Sarver, Pennsylvania	Cody Darrah	Kasey Kahne Racing with Mike Curb	Dale Blaney	-	-	-
48	July 24	Summer Nationals	Williams Grove Speedway, Mechanicsburg, Pennsylvania	Danny Dietrich	Gary Kauffman Racing	Brad Sweet	Jim Siegel	Donny Schatz	Greg Hodnett
48	July 24	Summer Nationals	Williams Grove Speedway, Mechanicsburg, Pennsylvania	Danny Dietrich	Gary Kauffman Racing	Brad Sweet	Shane Stewart	Donny Schatz	Lucas Wolfe
49	July 25	Summer Nationals	Williams Grove Speedway, Mechanicsburg, Pennsylvania	Stevie Smith	Fred Rahmer Racing	Brad Sweet	JJ Grasso	Sammy Swindell	Sammy Swindell
49	July 25	Summer Nationals	Williams Grove Speedway, Mechanicsburg, Pennsylvania	Stevie Smith	Fred Rahmer Racing	Brad Sweet	Jacob Allen	Sammy Swindell	Joey Saldana
50	July 26		Lebanon Valley Speedway, West Lebanon, New York	Donny Schatz	Tony Stewart/Curb-Agajanian Racing	Jacob Allen	-	Daryn Pittman	Kerry Madsen
51	July 28	Six Nations Showdown	Ohsweken Speedway, Ohsweken, Ontario	Stewart Friesen	Jessica Zemken Racing	Jason Johnson	Jared Zimbardi	Brad Sweet	Kerry Madsen
≠	July 31		Brockville Ontario Speedway, Brockville, Ontario	Race cancelled due to inclement weather.					
≠	August 1		Autodrome Drummond, Drummondville, Quebec	Race cancelled due to inclement weather.					
52	August 7	Prelude to the Ironman	Federated Auto Parts Raceway at I-55, Pevely, Missouri	Donny Schatz	Tony Stewart/Curb-Agajanian Racing	Logan Schuchart	Logan Schuchart	Kerry Madsen	Donny Schatz
53	August 8	Ironman 55	Federated Auto Parts Raceway at I-55, Pevely, Missouri	Shane Stewart	Larson Marks Racing	Logan Schuchart	Jamie Veal	Kerry Madsen	Joey Saldana
≈	August 12	FVP Knoxville Nationals	Knoxville Raceway, Knoxville, Iowa	Shane Stewart	Larson Marks Racing	Rico Abreu	Tasker Phillips	-	Donny Schatz
≈	August 13	FVP Knoxville Nationals	Knoxville Raceway, Knoxville, Iowa	Terry McCarl	TMAC Motorsports	Brian Brown	Clint Garner	-	Brad Sweet
≈	August 14	FVP Knoxville Nationals	Knoxville Raceway, Knoxville, Iowa	Bryan Clauson	Matt Wood Racing	Mark Dobmeier	Steve Kinser	-	Brent Marks
≈	August 14	FVP Knoxville Nationals	Knoxville Raceway, Knoxville, Iowa	Bryan Clauson	Matt Wood Racing	Mark Dobmeier	Aaron Reutzel	-	Billy Alley
≈	August 14	SPEED SPORT World Challenge	Knoxville Raceway, Knoxville, Iowa	Lynton Jeffrey	Vortex Racing Products	Christopher Bell	-	-	-
54	August 15	FVP Knoxville Nationals	Knoxville Raceway, Knoxville, Iowa	Donny Schatz	Tony Stewart/Curb-Agajanian Racing	Greg Hodnett	Wayne Johnson	-	-
55	August 18		Junction Motor Speedway, McCool Junction, Nebraska	Kerry Madsen	Keneric Racing	Logan Schuchart	-	Kerry Madsen	Joey Saldana
56	August 21	Second Leg of the Northern Tour	River Cities Speedway, Grand Forks, North Dakota	Donny Schatz	Tony Stewart/Curb-Agajanian Racing	Brad Sweet	Austin Pierce	Paul McMahan	Donny Schatz
57	August 22	Gerdau presents the Magic City Showdown	Nodak Speedway, Minot, North Dakota	Donny Schatz	Tony Stewart/Curb-Agajanian Racing	Greg Nikitenko	Jordan Adams	Paul McMahan	Kerry Madsen
58	August 28	9th Annual Oil City Cup	Castrol Raceway, Edmonton, Alberta	Donny Schatz	Tony Stewart/Curb-Agajanian Racing	Sean MacDonnell	Kelly Miller	Shane Stewart	David Gravel
59	August 29	9th Annual Oil City Cup	Castrol Raceway, Edmonton, Alberta	Daryn Pittman	Kasey Kahne Racing with Mike Curb	Kraig Kinser	Kelly Miller	David Gravel	Joey Saldana
≠	September 4	Monster Meltdown	Skagit Speedway, Alger, Washington	Race cancelled due to inclement weather.					
60	September 5	Monster Meltdown	Skagit Speedway, Alger, Washington	Shane Stewart	Larson Marks Racing	Reece Goetz	Kraig Kinser	Shane Stewart	Kerry Madsen
61	September 7		Grays Harbor Raceway, Elma, Washington	Donny Schatz	Tony Stewart/Curb-Agajanian Racing	Henry Van Dam	Brock Lemley	Paul McMahan	Joey Saldana
62	September 9		Cottage Grove Speedway, Cottage Grove, Oregon	Donny Schatz	Tony Stewart/Curb-Agajanian Racing	Jared Peterson	-	Daryn Pittman	Daryn Pittman
63	September 11	Gold Cup Race of Champions	Silver Dollar Speedway, Chico, California	Shane Stewart	Larson Marks Racing	Jason Johnson	Carson Macedo	Shane Stewart	DJ Netto
63	September 11	Gold Cup Race of Champions	Silver Dollar Speedway, Chico, California	Shane Stewart	Larson Marks Racing	Jason Johnson	Carson Macedo	Shane Stewart	Joey Saldana
64	September 12	Gold Cup Race of Champions	Silver Dollar Speedway, Chico, California	Donny Schatz	Tony Stewart/Curb-Agajanian Racing	Kyle Hirst	Jason Johnson	Joey Saldana	Kerry Madsen
64	September 12	Gold Cup Race of Champions	Silver Dollar Speedway, Chico, California	Donny Schatz	Tony Stewart/Curb-Agajanian Racing	Kyle Hirst	Jason Johnson	Joey Saldana	Paul McMahan
65	September 13		Antioch Speedway, Antioch, California	Daryn Pittman	Kasey Kahne Racing with Mike Curb	Jason Sides	Jason Statler	Joey Saldana	Rico Abreu
≠	September 18	The Arnold Motor Supply Shootout	Clay County Fairgrounds, Spencer, Iowa	Race cancelled due to inclement weather.					
66	September 19	Clash at the Creek	Deer Creek Speedway, Spring Valley, Minnesota	Brad Sweet	Kasey Kahne Racing with Mike Curb	David Gravel	Jacob Allen	Daryn Pittman	Kerry Madsen
67	September 25	4-Crown Nationals	Eldora Speedway, Rossburg, Ohio	Greg Wilson	Greg Wilson Racing	Dale Blaney	David Gravel	Chad Kemenah	Shane Stewart
68	September 26		Berlin Raceway, Marne, Michigan	Donny Schatz	Tony Stewart/Curb-Agajanian Racing	Ryan Ruhl	Jacob Allen	Jason Johnson	Daryn Pittman
≠	October 1	National Open	Williams Grove Speedway, Mechanicsburg, Pennsylvania	Race cancelled due to inclement weather.					
≠	October 2	National Open	Williams Grove Speedway, Mechanicsburg, Pennsylvania	Race cancelled due to inclement weather.					
69	October 4	National Open	Williams Grove Speedway, Mechanicsburg, Pennsylvania	Stevie Smith	Fred Rahmer Racing	Cody Darrah	Brian Montieth	Danny Dietrich	Stevie Smith
69	October 4	National Open	Williams Grove Speedway, Mechanicsburg, Pennsylvania	Stevie Smith	Fred Rahmer Racing	Cody Darrah	Brian Montieth	Danny Dietrich	Brian Montieth
70	October 10		Rolling Wheels Raceway, Elbridge, New York	Donny Schatz	Tony Stewart/Curb-Agajanian Racing	Joe Trenca	Jason Johnson	David Gravel	Paul McMahan
71	October 16		Lawrenceburg Speedway, Lawrenceburg, Indiana	Paul McMahan	CJB Motorsports	Cap Henry	Brad Sweet	Christopher Bell	Paul McMahan
72	October 24		Port Royal Speedway, Port Royal, Pennsylvania	Brad Sweet	Kasey Kahne Racing with Mike Curb	Dale Blaney	Justin Barger	Lucas Wolfe	Daryn Pittman
72	October 24		Port Royal Speedway, Port Royal, Pennsylvania	Brad Sweet	Kasey Kahne Racing with Mike Curb	Dale Blaney	Justin Barger	Lucas Wolfe	Donny Schatz
≠	October 25		Weedsport Speedway, Weedsport, New York	Race cancelled due to inclement weather.					
≈	November 5	Bad Boy Buggies World of Outlaws World Finals	The Dirt Track at Charlotte, Concord, North Carolina	Only the qualifying portion is held on the first day of the World Finals. The first set is for the first race, and the second set is for the second race.					Sammy Swindell
≈	November 5	Bad Boy Buggies World of Outlaws World Finals	The Dirt Track at Charlotte, Concord, North Carolina	Only the qualifying portion is held on the first day of the World Finals. The first set is for the first race, and the second set is for the second race.					Joey Saldana
73	November 6	Bad Boy Buggies World of Outlaws World Finals	The Dirt Track at Charlotte, Concord, North Carolina	Dusty Zomer	Blazin Racin	Donny Schatz	Sammy Swindell	Trey Starks	-
74	November 8	Bad Boy Buggies World of Outlaws World Finals	The Dirt Track at Charlotte, Concord, North Carolina	Joey Saldana	Motter Motorsports	Daryn Pittman	Daryn Pittman	Joey Saldana	-

- co-sanctioned with the King of the West Sprint Car Series
- event awarded show-up points for the All Star Circuit of Champions points championship
- ≠ indicates the race was canceled
- ≈ indicates the race was a non-points event

=== Schedule notes and changes ===
- April 24 race at Devil's Bowl Speedway was canceled due to weather conditions.
- Night 2 of the Morgan Cup (May 16) at Williams Grove Speedway was canceled due to weather conditions.
- May 25 race at Lawrenceburg Speedway was postponed due to weather conditions. The race was rescheduled for October 16.
- NAPA Auto Parts Rumble in Michigan (May 30) at I-96 Speedway was postponed due to weather conditions. The race was rescheduled for June 24.
- O'Reilly Auto Parts presents the Outlaws at Lakeside (June 6) at Lakeside Speedway was postponed due to weather conditions. The race was rescheduled for July 1.
- June 26 race at 34 Raceway was canceled due to weather conditions.
- Brad Doty Classic (July 16) at Limaland Motorsports Park was canceled due to weather conditions.
- July 31 race at Brockville Ontario Speedway was canceled due to weather conditions.
- August 1 race at Autodrome Drummond was canceled due to weather conditions.
- Night 1 of the Monster Meltdown (September 5) at Skagit Speedway was canceled due to weather conditions.
- The Arnold Motor Supply Shootout (September 18) at Clay County Fairgrounds was canceled due to weather conditions.
- Nights 1 and 2 of the National Open (October 1 & October 2) at Williams Grove Speedway were canceled due to weather conditions.
- Night 3 of the National Open (October 3) at Williams Grove Speedway was postponed due to weather conditions. The race was rescheduled for October 4.
- October 25 race at Weedsport Speedway was canceled due to weather conditions.
- Night 3 of the Bad Boy Buggies World of Outlaws World Finals at The Dirt Track at Charlotte was postponed due to weather conditions. The race was rescheduled for November 8.

== Championship Standings ==
=== Driver Standings ===
Pos.	No.	Driver	Pts.	Wins
1	15	Donny Schatz	10563	31
2	2	Shane Stewart	10019	9
3	49	Brad Sweet	9890	5
4	9	Daryn Pittman	9823	5
5	29	Kerry Madsen	9795	1
6	71m	Joey Saldana	9791	3
7	51	Paul McMahan	9667	3
8	7s	Jason Sides	9210	1
9	7	David Gravel	9174	0
10	1s	Logan Schuchart	8937	0
11	11k	Kraig Kinser	8471	0
12	41	Jason Johnson	7799	0
13	1a	Jacob Allen	7440	0
14	24	Rico Abreu	3406	2
15	2KS	Craig Dollansky	2785	0
16	1	Sammy Swindell	2721	0
17	35AU	Jamie Veal	2567	0
18	24	Terry McCarl	2420	1
19	11	Steve Kinser	2369	0
20	2L	Danny Lasoski	2362	1
21	19M	Brent Marks	2292	0
22	4	Cody Darrah	2288	1
23	3	Tim Kaeding	2259	1
24	18	Ian Madsen	2248	0
25	44W	Austen Wheatley	2184	0
26	5W	Lucas Wolfe	2105	0
27	19	Paige Polyak	2080	0
28	21	Brian Brown	2073	1
29	27	Greg Hodnett	1932	1
30	10H	Chad Kemenah	1801	0
31	23S	Trey Starks	1775	0
32	1B	Dale Blaney	1733	2
33	17W	Bryan Clauson	1671	0
34	83JR	Kyle Hirst	1669	0
35	67	Christopher Bell	1668	1
36	0	Bud Kaeding	1624	0
37	7H	Jojo Helberg	1572	0
38	2LX	Logan Forler	1559	0
39	W20	Greg Wilson	1535	1
40	88N	D.J. Netto	1509	0
41	82	Dusty Zomer	1503	1
42	99T	Skylar Gee	1388	0
43	41	Dominic Scelzi	1376	0
44	O5	Brad Loyet	1372	0
45	3C	Jonathan Allard	1326	0
46	48	Danny Dietrich	1297	1
47	5V	Colby Copeland	1277	0
48	45	Tim Shaffer	1269	0
49	21X	Carson Macedo	1258	0
50	11N	Randy Hannagan	1258	0
51	1ST	Gary Taylor	1244	0
52	59	Danny Holtgraver	1230	0
53	31C	Justyn Cox	1188	0
54	22K	Shane Golobic	1157	0
55	51S	Stevie Smith	1092	2
56	98H	Dave Blaney	1054	0
57	17B	Steve Buckwalter	1016	0
58	26	Willie Croft	989	0
59	13	Mark Dobmeier	967	0
60	99	Brady Bacon	960	0
61	93	Sheldon Haudenschild	958	0
62	11K	Mikey Kuemper	954	0
63	71MX	Paul May	951	0
64	94	Ryan Smith	922	0
65	17B	Bill Balog	882	0
66	20N	Hunter Schuerenberg	878	0
67	9P	Parker Price-Miller	824	0
68	27	Chase Johnson	813	0
69	25	Aaron Ott	811	0
70	44	Chris Martin	790	0
71	3G	James McFadden	780	0
72	31B	Kevin Swindell	774	0
73	12	Robbie Stillwagon	760	0
74	71A	R.J. Johnson	753	0
75	22	Mason Moore	748	0
76	00X	Cory Eliason	730	0
77	49X	Tanner Thorson	722	0
78	36D	Wayne Dadetto	711	0
79	5	Dave Glennon	708	0
80	4S	Danny Smith	703	0
81	15H	Sam Hafertepe Jr.	688	0
82	63	Kody Swanson	652	0
83	14	Lance Dewease	648	0
84	21	Brian Montieth	636	0
85	98	Sean Watts	622	0
86	55	Mark Smith	619	0
87	12X	Jarrett Soares	616	0
88	39	Tim Glatfelter	612	0
89	22	Cole Duncan	607	0
90	26	Tayler Malsam	597	0
91	1Z	Stewart Friesen	590	1
92	39C	Travis Rilat	584	0
93	2M	Dustin Daggett	584	0
94	3Z	Brock Zearfoss	567	0
95	OO	Jason Statler	563	0
96	25	Bobby McMahan	557	0
97	13	Jac Haudenschild	552	0
98	77X	Wayne Johnson	550	0
99	99	Scott Parker	539	0
100	99	Shawn Wright	539	0
101	O7	Doug Esh	535	0
102	81	Lee Jacobs	533	0
103	3	Pat Cannon	529	0
104	55	Brooke Tatnell	527	0
105	87	Alan Krimes	527	0
106	9X	Paul Nienhiser	505	0
107	41	Jason Meyers	504	0
108	21	D.J. Foos	496	0
109	5T	Travis Philo	495	0
110	16	Ryan Ruhl	493	0
111	11C	Cory Haas	487	0
112	87	Aaron Reutzel	483	0
113	21K	Kyle Reinhardt	471	0
114	60	Kory Crabtree	471	0
115	37	Mitchell Faccinto	469	0
116	92	Andy Forsberg	442	0
117	35	Jared Zimbardi	441	0
118	98	Joe Trenca	439	0
119	Q83	David Murcott	425	0
120	33V	Henry Van Dam	423	0
121	18	Jason Solwold	410	0
122	6	Bill Rose	409	0
123	1X	Don Droud Jr.	408	0
124	20A	Jordan Adams	404	0
125	17A	Austin McCarl	400	0
126	4K	A.J. Bruns	400	0
127	55	Davey Heskin	394	0
128	91	Cale Thomas	390	0
129	4	Dakota Hendrickson	386	0
130	75	Sean Becker	376	0
131	33M	Caleb Griffith	373	0
132	69K	Justin Henderson	373	0
133	69	Brent Kaeding	365	0
134	23	Lance Moss	365	0
135	44	Rodney Westhafer	363	0
136	38	Jared Horstman	359	0
137	21	Cap Henry	358	0
138	40	Caleb Helms	357	0
139	59J	Jim Siegel	357	0
140	12W	Troy Fraker	357	0
141	75	Nicole Bower	357	0
142	37	J.J. Grasso	357	0
143	99	Jordan Graham	342	0
144	35	Stuart Brubaker	340	0
145	14T	Jimmy Bridgeman	340	0
146	92	Mitch Mack	340	0
147	9R	Reece Goetz	340	0
148	49H	Bradley Howard	340	0
149	44	Chase Dietz	340	0
150	21	Robbie Price	338	0
151	20	Ryan Taylor	329	0
152	2AJ	Austin Pierce	324	0
153	14	Andy Gregg	323	0
154	1J	Danny Jennings	317	0
155	5	Justin Barger	317	0
156	6N	Greg Nikitenko	315	0
157	64	Scotty Thiel	315	0
158	88	Tyler Walker	314	0
159	33E	Evan Suggs	313	0
160	19	Donovan Peterson	313	0
161	19	Joe Kubiniec	313	0
162	51A	Andy Anderson	311	0
163	8	Casey Mack	311	0
164	9Z	Jared Goerges	307	0
165	52	Austin Hogue	303	0
166	13X	Ty Hanten	301	0
167	23C	Tyler Courtney	295	0
168	4K	Kody Kinser	293	0
169	8H	Jade Hastings	292	0
170	23	Russell Borland	286	0
171	5C	Dylan Cisney	282	0
172	1P	Curtis Evans	280	0
173	91	Anthony Fiore	280	0
174	94	Brandon Thone	278	0
175	99	Kory Weyant	278	0
176	25	Dylan Peterson	276	0
177	47	Brant O'Banion	276	0
178	96	Bronson Maeschen	274	0
179	7W	Logan Wagner	272	0
180	94	Gordon Rodgers	255	0
181	55F	Taylor Ferris	255	0
182	45L	Brian Lay	255	0
183	77	Darren Mollenoyux	255	0
184	72	Kevin Petty	255	0
185	7TAZ	Tasker Phillips	255	0
186	19	Bob Weuve	255	0
187	2K	Kevin Ingel	255	0
188	89	Branden Mansfield	255	0
189	13	Rowdy McClenon	255	0
190	2W	Glenndon Forsythe	255	0
191	7N	Jared Peterson	240	0
192	1K	Chris Shirek	236	0
193	11EH	Marc Duperron	234	0
194	12	Casey Adams	232	0
195	33	Shawn Donath	232	0
196	45X	Johnny Herrera	230	0
197	98	Brock Lemley	228	0
198	51R	Freddie Rahmer	226	0
199	8	Sean MacDonnell	226	0
200	56	Ross Matthewson	226	0
201	4	Matthew Dusseault	226	0
202	5	Tyler Ross	224	0
203	6X	Mark Cole	222	0
204	2X	Kyle Evans	222	0
205	12	Lynton Jeffery	219	0
206	23D	Trey Datweiler	216	0
207	40DD	Nate Dussel	215	0
208	17	Ryan Bickett	214	0
209	97	Brian Herbert	214	0
210	2JR	Kelly Miller	214	0
211	O3	Joe Wood	209	0
212	16	Gerard McIntyre	209	0
213	4W	Matt Wasmund	208	0
214	9N	Wade Nygaard	207	0
215	5J	Jeremy Schultz	205	0
216	2M	Don Miller	204	0
217	28F	Davey Franek	204	0
218	95	Matt Covington	203	0
219	4J	Allison Journey	203	0
220	17	Justin Sanders	203	0
221	15X	Joe Riedel	201	0
222	11R	Chase Ridenour	201	0
223	0	Nick Omdahl	199	0
224	35	Skylar Prochaska	197	0
225	3A	Billy Alley	197	0
226	99M	Kyle Moody	197	0
227	101	Chuck McGillivary	195	0
228	47	Eric Riggins	195	0
229	16	Travis Whitney	193	0
230	4X	Eric Schultz	189	0
231	97	Dean Jacobs	189	0
232	6R	Ryan Bunton	187	0
233	3	Chris Stidham	170	0
234	19	Keith Bloom	170	0
235	98	Matt Jensen	170	0
236	3F	Geoff Ensign	170	0
237	74X	Josh Hodges	170	0
238	51B	Joe B Miller	170	0
239	9K	Kevin Thomas	170	0
240	88	Brandon Rahmer	170	0
241	7M	Critter Malone	170	0
242	51A	Andrew Anderson	170	0
243	91	John Sernett	170	0
244	5J	Jeremy Schultz	170	0
245	35	Wes McGlumphy	170	0
246	70	Derek Hagar	170	0
247	27	Beau Stewart	170	0
248	3W	Hunter Mackison	170	0
249	17M	Joey Moughan	170	0
250	97	Tommy Worley Jr.	170	0
251	7D	Dustin Selvage	170	0
252	75	Glen Saville	170	0
253	2L	Ed Lynch Jr.	170	0
254	6	Zach Wilde	170	0
255	17M	Todd Mickelson	170	0
256	0	Robert Lavallee	170	0
257	10B	Brody Anderson	170	0
258	81	Darren Smith	170	0
259	18	Brayden McMahan	170	0
260	11AU	Toby Bellbowen	170	0
261	O9	Matt Juhl	170	0
262	5QB	Quentin Blonde	170	0
263	15A	Adam Wilt	170	0
264	73	Jevon Ahner	170	0
265	67K	Kyle Larson	144	0
266	21T	Tommy Tarlton	132	0
267	9X	Rob Chaney	132	0
268	1Z	Jessica Zemken	130	0
269	747	Davey Sammons	124	0
270	O7X	Dain Naida	124	0
271	5D	Dave Dykstra	120	0
272	7M	Todd Shaffer	120	0
273	69	Randy Waitman	118	0
274	38	Jared Horstmen	118	0
275	12W	Josh Walter	118	0
276	18	Tony Bruce Jr.	116	0
277	O9	Craig Mintz	116	0
278	5R	Byron Reed	114	0
279	2W	Scotty Neitzel	114	0
280	2AJ	A.J. Flick	114	0
281	20J	James Sweeney	112	0
282	9S	Landon Hurst	112	0
283	55K	Robbie Kendall	112	0
284	4S	Kevin Nagy	112	0
285	79	Blake Nimee	112	0
286	O7	Jacob Wilson	112	0
287	51A	Doug Martens	110	0
288	12	Mike Decker	110	0
289	21T	Ray Kulhanek	108	0
290	6W	Brad Wickham	108	0
291	13V	Seth Brahmer	108	0
292	19L	Chase Viebrock	108	0
293	22	Brandon Spithaler	108	0
294	67C	Steven Collins	108	0
295	10X	Carl Bowser	106	0
296	20L	Dusty Lason	106	0
297	56	Justin Youngquist	106	0
298	27	Brad Lamberson	106	0
299	49K	Scott Kreutter	106	0
300	1M	Phil Mock	104	0
301	91	Ryan Turner	104	0
302	1A	Colby Womer	104	0
303	69K	Don Kreitz Jr,	102	0
304	49J	Josh Schniederman	102	0
305	19	Brett Mann	102	0
306	O8	Dan Kuriger	102	0
307	11X	Jamie Turner	102	0
308	55	Michael Wagner III	102	0
309	56	Ryan Bernal	85	0
310	15H	Pat Harvey Jr,	85	0
311	57	Billy Butler	85	0
312	45	Jake Morgan	85	0
313	74B	John Carney	85	0
314	4X	Shawn Peterson	85	0
315	17	Lane Whittington	85	0
316	1AX	Kevin Ramey	85	0
317	23	James Light	85	0
318	29W	Ryan Wilson	85	0
319	35	Steve Owings	85	0
320	1X	Tim Wagaman	85	0
321	92	Niki Young	85	0
322	69H	Shane Hoff	85	0
323	42	John Smith III	85	0
324	2H	Steven Hutchinson	85	0
325	75	Tommy Wickham	85	0
326	61	Parker Evans	85	0
327	19A	Chris Andrews	85	0
328	9Z	Duane Zablocki	85	0
329	40I	Mark Imler	85	0
330	A97	Brandon Wimmer	85	0
331	5	Danny Reidy	85	0
332	23	Jimmie Light	85	0
333	0	Branden Stevenson	85	0
334	20	A.J. Moeller	85	0
335	45	Mark Johnson	85	0
336	44D	Andy Snider	85	0
337	13JM	Jordon Martens	85	0
338	19L	Reed Allex	85	0
339	199	Ryan Bowers	85	0
340	8B	Jack Croaker	85	0
341	55	Shane Liebig	85	0
342	10S	Jason Steinebach	85	0
343	8M	T.J. Michael	85	0
344	5	Matt Vandervere	85	0
345	14AJ	Wayne Modjeski	85	0
346	96AU	Bruce White	85	0
347	57X	Andrew Palker	85	0
348	3F	Rick Fraley	85	0
349	56R	Ryan Myers	85	0
350	57	Andrew Palker	85	0
351	8	Brandon Matus	85	0
352	4K	William Kiley	85	0
353	7E	Eric Williams	85	0
354	5	Keith Dempster	85	0
355	3R	Shane Ross	85	0
356	19X	Cory Turner	85	0
357	27H	Tom Huppunen	85	0
358	47X	Dylan Westbrook	85	0
359	1M	Jim Moughan	85	0
360	99x	Tim Taylor	85	0
361	52F	Logan Faucon	85	0
362	94	Jeff Swindell	95	0
363	40	Clint Garner	85	0
364	81	Austin Johnson	85	0
365	69	Mike Moore	85	0
366	28	Jonathan Cornell	85	0
367	23	Jimmy Light	85	0
368		Kaley Gharst	85	0
369		Jon Agan	85	0
370		Josh Schneiderman	85	0
371		Josh Baughman	85	0
372		Bobby Mincer	85	0
373		Tony Shilling	85	0
374		Jordyn Brazier	85	0
375	24	Trevor Canales	85	0
376	25	Cory Mack	85	0
377	91M	Jackson Moffett	85	0
378	21	Ryder Olson	85	0
379	20	Kevin Lawson	85	0
380	90	Randy Blotsky	85	0
381	9A	Luke Didiuk	85	0
382	92K	Koen Shaw	85	0
383	95	Brandon Dozier	85	0
384	19	Art McCarthy	85	0
385	7	Trent Stengl	85	0
386	35	Mark Strpko	85	0
387	3	Dave Ely	85	0
388	87	George Suprick	85	0
389	33	Chuck Hebing	85	0
390	10	Joe Kata III	85	0
391	49D	Shawn Dancer	85	0
392	22	Ryan Broughton	85	0
393	33	Curt Stroup	85	0
394	8S	Trenton Shaeffer	85	0
395	44H	Joel Hershey	85	0
396	24B	Dustin Baney	85	0
397	23	T.J. Stutts	85	0

=== Team Standings ===
Pos.	No.	Team	Pts.
1	15	Tony Stewart/Curb-Agajanian Racing	10563
2	2	Larson/Marks Racing	10019
3	9	Kasey Kahne Racing with Mike Curb	9907
4	49	Kasey Kahne Racing with Mike Curb	9890
5	29	Keneric Racing	9795
6	71m	Motter Motorsports	9791
7	51	CJB Motorsports	9667
8	7s	Sides Motorsports	9210
9	1s	Shark Racing	8937
10	7	Destiny Motorsports	8914
11	41	Jason Johnson Racing	8846
12	11k	Steve Kinser Racing	8527
13	1a	Shark Racing	7544
