= 2016 World of Outlaws Craftsman Sprint Car Series =

The 2016 World of Outlaws Craftsman Sprint Car Series season was the 38th season of the winged sprint car series in North America. The season began with the DIRTcar Nationals at Volusia Speedway Park on February 12, and ended with the Bad Boy Off Road World of Outlaws World Finals at The Dirt Track at Charlotte on October 29. Donny Schatz entered the season as the defending series champion, and won the 2017 championship, his eighth overall.

== Full-time teams and drivers ==
No.	Driver	Hometown	Team
1a	Jacob Allen	Hanover, Pennsylvania	Shark Racing
1s	Logan Schuchart	Hanover, Pennsylvania	Shark Racing
2	Shane Stewart	Bixby, Oklahoma	Larson Marks Racing
5	David Gravel	Watertown, Connecticut	CJB Motorsports
7	Paul McMahan	Elk Grove, California	Destiny Motorsports
7S	Jason Sides	Bartlett, Tennessee	Sides Motorsports
9	Daryn Pittman	Owasso, Oklahoma	Kasey Kahne Racing with Mike Curb
15	Donny Schatz	Minot, North Dakota	Tony Stewart/Curb-Agajanian Racing
w20	Greg Wilson	Benton Ridge, Ohio	Greg Wilson Racing
41	Jason Johnson	Eunice, Louisiana	Jason Johnson Racing
49	Brad Sweet	Grass Valley, California	Kasey Kahne Racing with Mike Curb
83	Joey Saldana	Brownsburg, Indiana	Roth Motorsports

== Schedule/Results ==
No.	Date	Race title	Track	Winning driver	TV/Stream
1	February 12	DIRTcar Nationals	Volusia Speedway Park, Barberville, Florida	Brad Sweet	DIRTvision.com
2	February 13	DIRTcar Nationals	Volusia Speedway Park, Barberville, Florida	Donny Schatz	DIRTvision.com
3	February 14	DIRTcar Nationals	Volusia Speedway Park, Barberville, Florida	Brad Sweet	DIRTvision.com
4	February 26	ATX Rentals Outlaw Shootout	Cotton Bowl Speedway, Paige, Texas	Brad Sweet	
5	February 27	O'Reilly Auto Parts presents the World of Outlaws hosted by Kasey Kahne	Royal Purple Raceway, Baytown, Texas	Daryn Pittman	
6	March 3	FVP Outlaw Showdown	The Dirt Track at Las Vegas Motor Speedway, Las Vegas, Nevada	Joey Saldana	DIRTvision.com
7	March 4	FVP Outlaw Showdown	The Dirt Track at Las Vegas Motor Speedway, Las Vegas, Nevada	Donny Schatz	DIRTvision.com
8	March 6	NAPA Desert Shootout	Arizona Speedway, Queen Creek, Arizona	Shane Stewart	
≠	March 11		Thunderbowl Raceway, Tulare, California	Canceled	
9	March 12		Thunderbowl Raceway, Tulare, California	David Gravel	DIRTvision.com
10	March 18	FVP Western Spring Shootout	Stockton Dirt Track, Stockton, California	Donny Schatz	
11	March 19	FVP Western Spring Shootout	Stockton Dirt Track, Stockton, California	Donny Schatz	
12	March 23	Brad Sweet presents Placerville Short Track Outlaw Showdown	Placerville Raceway, Placerville, California	Jason Johnson	
13	April 1	Ocean Outlaw Showdown presented by Budweiser	Ocean Speedway, Watsonville, California	Brad Sweet	
14	April 2	Mini Gold Cup	Silver Dollar Speedway, Chico, California	Donny Schatz	
≠	April 9	Wine Country Outlaw Showdown	Calistoga Speedway, Calistoga, California	Canceled	
≠	April 10	Wine Country Outlaw Showdown	Calistoga Speedway, Calistoga, California	Canceled	
15	April 15	Budweiser Bash	Bakersfield Speedway, Bakersfield, California	Brad Sweet	
16	April 16	SoCal Showdown	Perris Auto Speedway, Perris, California	Daryn Pittman	
17	April 18	NAPA Wildcat Shootout	USA Raceway, Tucson, Arizona	Daryn Pittman	
18	April 22	Texas Outlaw Nationals	Devil's Bowl Speedway, Mesquite, Texas	Joey Saldana	DIRTvision.com
19	April 23	Texas Outlaw Nationals	Devil's Bowl Speedway, Mesquite, Texas	Shane Stewart	DIRTvision.com
20	April 26		I-30 Speedway, Little Rock, Arkansas	Jason Sides	
≠	April 29	Spring Classic	Federated Auto Parts Raceway at I-55, Pevely, Missouri	Canceled	
21	May 4		Jacksonville Speedway, Jacksonville, Illinois	Joey Saldana	
22	May 6	#LetsRaceTwo	Eldora Speedway, Rossburg, Ohio	Kerry Madsen	
23	May 7	#LetsRaceTwo	Eldora Speedway, Rossburg, Ohio	Kerry Madsen	
24	May 13	Bob Newton Classic	Plymouth Speedway, Plymouth, Indiana	Brad Sweet	DIRTvision.com
25	May 14		Tri-State Speedway, Haubstadt, Indiana	David Gravel	
26	May 19	Gettysburg Clash	Lincoln Speedway, Abbottstown, Pennsylvania	Donny Schatz	DIRTvision.com
27	May 20		Williams Grove Speedway, Mechanicsburg, Pennsylvania	Lance Dewease	DIRTvision.com
≠	May 21	Morgan Cup	Williams Grove Speedway, Mechanicsburg, Pennsylvania	Canceled	
28	May 22	Empire State Challenge	Weedsport Speedway, Weedsport, New York	Donny Schatz	
29	May 24	Jersey Outlaw Classic	New Egypt Speedway, New Egypt, New Jersey	Daryn Pittman	
30	May 27	Circle K/NOS Energy Drink Outlaw Showdown	The Dirt Track at Charlotte Motor Speedway, Concord, North Carolina	Greg Wilson	DIRTvision.com
31	May 30		Lawrenceburg Speedway, Lawrenceburg, Indiana	Shane Stewart	
32	June 3	Kistler Engines Smackdown	Fremont Speedway, Fremont, Ohio	Chad Kemenah	
33	June 5	Rumble in Michigan	I-96 Speedway, Lake Odessa, Michigan	David Gravel	
34	June 8		Lincoln Park Speedway, Putnamville, Indiana	Donny Schatz	
35	June 10	Budweiser Night with the World of Outlaws	Knoxville Raceway, Knoxville, Iowa	Terry McCarl	DIRTvision.com
36	June 11	Xtream Shootout powered by Mediacom	Knoxville Raceway, Knoxville, Iowa	Donny Schatz	DIRTvision.com
37	June 15		Granite City Speedway, Sauk Rapids, Minnesota	Shane Stewart	
38	June 17	First Leg of the Northern Tour	River Cities Speedway, Grand Forks, North Dakota	Donny Schatz	
39	June 19		Brown County Speedway, Aberdeen, South Dakota	Shane Stewart	
40	June 22	NAPA Auto Parts Outlaw Showdown	I-80 Speedway, Greenwood, Nebraska	Joey Saldana	
41	June 24		Jackson Motorplex, Jackson, Minnesota	Daryn Pittman	
42	June 25	Jim "JB" Boyd Memorial presented by Karavan Trailers	Beaver Dam Raceway, Beaver Dam, Wisconsin	Bill Balog	
43	June 29	Outlaw Clay Classic	Rockford Speedway, Loves Park, Illinois	Donny Schatz	DIRTvision.com
44	July 2		Badlands Motor Speedway, Brandon, South Dakota	Brad Sweet	DIRTvision.com
45	July 3		Badlands Motor Speedway, Brandon, South Dakota	Donny Schatz	DIRTvision.com
46	July 8	FVP Outlaws at Cedar Lake	Cedar Lake Speedway, New Richmond, Wisconsin	Logan Schuchart	DIRTvision.com
47	July 9	FVP Outlaws at Cedar Lake	Cedar Lake Speedway, New Richmond, Wisconsin	Donny Schatz	DIRTvision.com
48	July 12	Ohio Logistics Brad Doty Classic	Attica Raceway Park, Attica, Ohio	Donny Schatz	
49	July 14	Joker's Wild	Eldora Speedway, Rossburg, Ohio	David Gravel	DIRTvision.com
50	July 15	Knight Before the Kings Royal	Eldora Speedway, Rossburg, Ohio	Daryn Pittman	DIRTvision.com
51	July 16	Kings Royal	Eldora Speedway, Rossburg, Ohio	Donny Schatz	DIRTvision.com
52	July 19	Don Martin Memorial Silver Cup	Lernerville Speedway, Sarver, Pennsylvania	David Gravel	
53	July 22	Summer Nationals	Williams Grove Speedway, Mechanicsburg, Pennsylvania	Daryn Pittman	DIRTvision.com
54	July 23	Summer Nationals	Williams Grove Speedway, Mechanicsburg, Pennsylvania	Lance Dewease	DIRTvision.com
55	July 26	Six Nations Shootout	Ohsweken Speedway, Ohsweken, Ontario, Canada	Donny Schatz	
≠	July 29		Hartford Speedway, Hartford, Michigan	Postponed	
56	July 30	O'Reilly Auto Parts Badger 40	Wilmot Speedway, Wilmot, Wisconsin	David Gravel	
57	August 5	Prelude to the Ironman	Federated Auto Parts Raceway at I-55, Pevely, Missouri	David Gravel	DIRTvision.com
58	August 6	Ironman 55	Federated Auto Parts Raceway at I-55, Pevely, Missouri	Rico Abreu	DIRTvision.com
≈	August 10	5-HOUR ENERGY Knoxville Nationals	Knoxville Raceway, Knoxville, Iowa	Shane Stewart	The Cushion
≈	August 11	5-HOUR ENERGY Knoxville Nationals	Knoxville Raceway, Knoxville, Iowa	Tim Kaeding	The Cushion
≈	August 12	5-HOUR ENERGY Knoxville Nationals	Knoxville Raceway, Knoxville, Iowa	Rico Abreu	The Cushion
≈	August 12	Speed Sport World Challenge	Knoxville Raceway, Knoxville, Iowa	Kraig Kinser	The Cushion
59	August 13	5-HOUR ENERGY Knoxville Nationals	Knoxville Raceway, Knoxville, Iowa	Jason Johnson	MavTV The Cushion
60	August 16		Junction Motor Speedway, McCool Junction, Nebraska	Donny Schatz	
61	August 21	Miller Lite Cornfest	Angell Park Speedway, Sun Prairie, Wisconsin	Donny Schatz	
62	August 26	Second Leg of the Northern Tour	River Cities Speedway, Grand Forks, North Dakota	Donny Schatz	
63	August 28	Gerdau Magic City Showdown presented by Fastlane Carwash	Nodak Speedway, Ninot, North Dakota	Donny Schatz	
64	September 2	Monster Meltdown	Skagit Speedway, Alger, Washington	David Gravel	
65	September 3	Monster Meltdown	Skagit Speedway, Alger, Washington	David Gravel	
≠	September 5		Grays Harbor Raceway, Elma, Washington	Canceled	
66	September 7		Willamette Speedway, Lebanon, Oregon	Donny Schatz	
67	September 9	Gold Cup Race of Champions	Silver Dollar Speedway, Chico, California	Shane Stewart	DIRTvision.com
68	September 10	Gold Cup Race of Champions	Silver Dollar Speedway, Chico, California	Rico Abreu	DIRTvision.com
69	September 14		El Paso County Raceway, Calhan, Colorado	Jason Johnson	
70	September 16	Arnold Motor Supply Shootout	Clay County Fairgrounds, Spencer, Iowa	Donny Schatz	
71	September 17	FVP Missouri High-Banked Nationals	US 36 Raceway, Osborn, Missouri	Joey Saldana	
72	September 21		Hartford Speedway, Hartford, Michigan	Shane Stewart	
73	September 23	4-Crown Nationals	Eldora Speedway, Rossburg, Ohio	Shane Stewart	
74	September 24	Commonwealth Clash	Lernerville Speedway, Sarver, Pennsylvania	Donny Schatz	
≠	September 29	Champion Racing Oil National Open	Williams Grove Speedway, Mechanicsburg, Pennsylvania	Canceled	DIRTvision.com
≠	September 30	Champion Racing Oil National Open	Williams Grove Speedway, Mechanicsburg, Pennsylvania	Canceled	DIRTvision.com
≠	October 1	Champion Racing Oil National Open	Williams Grove Speedway, Mechanicsburg, Pennsylvania	Postponed	DIRTvision.com
75	October 8		Fulton Speedway, Fulton, New York	Donny Schatz	
76	October 14	Champion Racing Oil National Open	Williams Grove Speedway, Mechanicsburg, Pennsylvania	Danny Dietrich	DIRTvision.com
77	October 15		Port Royal Speedway, Port Royal, Pennsylvania	Logan Schuchart	
78	October 21	O'Reilly Auto Parts Rumble on the River	Lakeside Speedway, Kansas City, Kansas	Brad Sweet	
79	October 22	O'Reilly Auto Parts Twister Showdown	Salina Highbanks Speedway, Salina, Oklahoma	Daryn Pittman	
≈	October 27	Bad Boy Off Road World of Outlaws World Finals	The Dirt Track at Charlotte Motor Speedway, Concord, North Carolina	≈	DIRTvision.com
80	October 28	Bad Boy Off Road World of Outlaws World Finals	The Dirt Track at Charlotte Motor Speedway, Concord, North Carolina	Jason Johnson	DIRTvision.com
81	October 29	Bad Boy Off Road World of Outlaws World Finals	The Dirt Track at Charlotte Motor Speedway, Concord, North Carolina	Donny Schatz	DIRTvision.com

- - ≠ will state if the race was postponed or canceled
- - ≈ will state if the race is not for championship points

=== Schedule notes and changes ===
- - the July 29th race at Hartford Speedway was postponed to September 21 due to weather
- - the Rock N' Roll Gold Cup at Badlands Motor Speedway was removed from the World of Outlaws schedule after failing to meet sanctioning negotiations.
