= Tekawennake =

Community newspaper in Ontario

Tekawennake or the Tekawennake News is a discontinued weekly community newspaper, published in Ohsweken, Ontario to serve the region's Six Nations and Mississauga First Nations. The paper billed itself as Canada's oldest weekly that served First Nations. The paper started publication in 1967 with only 50 copies printed and folded in 2013.

== See also ==
- Turtle Island News
- Two Row Times
