= Aaron Carapella =

American cartographer

- Born: c. 1980 (age 44–45); Warner, Oklahoma
- Occupation: Cartographer
- Known for: Making maps of original tribal lands of Native Americans in the United States, Canada, Mexico

Aaron Carapella is an American self-taught cartographer who makes maps of the locations and names of Pre-Columbian Indigenous tribes of North America circa 1490. At age 19, he began his map-making research and as of 2014, he has made maps of Indigenous tribes with their original names for the continental United States, Canada, and Mexico.

== Biography ==
Carapella is from Warner, Oklahoma. He told NPR that he is "mixed-blood Cherokee" on his mother's side and lives in a ranch house in the Cherokee Nation in Oklahoma. He speaks Spanish, and has a bachelor's degree in marketing from Indiana Institute of Technology. He identifies with the Cherokee Nation. His grandparents on his mother's side, instilled in him a deep interest in Native Americans:

My Grandparents would tell me, you're part Native American and that's part of your history. They would give me books to read about different tribes' histories, so, I grew up with a curiosity of always wanting to learn more about Native American history.

When he was a teenager, he wanted to find a map of the United States that depicted all of the Native American tribes on it. He went to numerous powwows, but he could never find a map that depicted all of the tribes. Instead, he typically found maps that depicted 50 to 100 tribes. He told Rick Smith writing for Win Awenen Nisitotung that

I would attend powwows and scour through the items vendors had for sell. From time to time I would see maps of the traditional territories of our tribes, but thought they looked incomplete, and the names mostly inaccurate. I filed away the idea of one day creating a more authentic-looking one myself.

When he was younger, he described himself as a "radical youngster" who was involved in Native American causes and protested Columbus Day. He is a member of the American Indian Movement. Now, he focuses on map making as "a way to convey the truth in a different way".

== Map making ==
He constructs maps of Native American tribal lands with their original names prior to Europeans coming to the Americas. His motivation for making maps stems from his childhood, but he began research and construction of maps at the age of 19 and, as of 2014, he has worked on them for more than 14 years. His aim has been to construct Pre-Columbian era maps circa 1490, just before Columbus landed in the Americas. Part of his inspiration for constructing maps with the original tribal names came from a book he read that explained some of the original tribal names and what they meant.

To accomplish his goal, he began reading books, going to library archives and then calling up tribal members and visiting reservations to rediscover original tribal names and where they were located. His research and map construction began as four "pencil-marked poster boards on his bedroom wall". Some of the tribes he contacted did not initially know the information he needed, but someone from the tribe would always get back to him with the information he needed to continue his research and map building. For example, he often would call a tribe to ask for their original name and they would reply that they did not know what they had called themselves. They would then ask an elder of the tribe and discover the name. In another case, Carapella did not know what name of the Waileptu or Cayuse people meant and he could not find it with Internet searches or in any books, but one of the last speakers of their language was able to tell him what it meant.

He found the Handbook of North American Indians to be very helpful in constructing his maps. He cross-referenced the book with other sources such as missionary records and army records to determine where a European trader reported that he met a particular tribe. This allowed him to narrow down the locations of tribes to approximately 1490. He then would verify his findings by contacting tribes to verify the spelling of the original tribal names and their tribal locations.

Carapella told the Navajo Times that the biggest challenge in constructing these maps was finding all of the original names. He found research on his maps especially difficult because some tribes had only a few surviving members and even fewer speakers of their native language. Other small tribes had disappeared and the only information left was in the tribes that had absorbed them. He believes that his research shows that while some tribal names have gone extinct, the decedents of these tribes were assimilated into other larger tribes. That is, when a tribe was driven out of an area it inhabited area, the survivors were usually assimilated into a larger tribe: "If you're a member of the Creek tribe, for example, you probably have the blood of 15 to 20 former tribal nations".

Carapella observed that the tendency for tribes to maintain their original name often depended on whether they still lived near their original homeland. He has speculated that

it is because the names they used for themselves usually are descriptive phrases. So, a lot of tribes call themselves, 'we are the people at the mouth of the river'. If you have been removed from your territory through the trail of tears, or the long walk by like a thousand miles from where that mouth of the river is people no longer think of themselves as 'the people at the mouth of the river'. When you get dispossessed of your traditional homeland, there is a cultural rift that happens. A loss that happens from being off of where you are supposed to be.

In 2012, he contacted the United States Copyright Office to have them do a search on whether his concept of a map had been copyrighted before. When they reported back that no such maps had been copyrighted, he put all his efforts into getting the first map drawn and he copyrighted it when he completed it.

== Maps ==
As of 2014, he has completed maps of the continental United States, Canada, and Mexico. The first map of the United States was released in November, 2012, and according to Two Row Times it was the first to show North American indigenous nations in their original languages. According to senior geographer at the National Museum of the American Indian in Washington, D.C., Doug Herman, his maps are unique because they include both the original name of Native American tribes and the names they are commonly known by. According to Herman

You can look at [Carapella's] map, and you can sort of get it immediately. This is Indian Country, and it's not the Indian Country that I thought it was because all these names are different.

Herman also noted that some of the common names for Native American tribes are derogatory. Sometimes one tribe described another tribe with a derogatory term in their language and it stuck as the common name for that tribe. For example, the word "Comanche" is a word in the Ute language that means in English "anyone who wants to fight me all the time". Herman told NPR

It's like having a map of North America where the United States is labeled 'gringos' and Mexico is labeled 'wetbacks'. Naming is an exercise in power. Whether you're naming places or naming peoples, you are therefore asserting a power of sort of establishing what is reality and what is not.

For example, instead of finding "Comanche" on the map there is "Numinu" and instead of "Navajo" there is "Diné" (though he also makes maps with the original name on top and the current name below such as "Diné" above and "Navajo" below.)

Maps today of Native American lands depict small trust lands and reservations surrounded by vast amounts of lands that were ceded away by treaties or forcibly taken over the years. Carapella's maps show that before 1492, North America was filled with a large number of autonomous tribes.

He also wanted his maps to indicate both the size of the tribal populations and the regions they inhabited. The maps were developed with the help of Overdrive Media and Printing in Flagstaff, Arizona. His maps have photographs or illustrations of individuals, artifacts, dwellings, and clothing that are appropriate to the tribe and are placed in the appropriate locations for each tribe.

The map of the continental United States that he constructed has approximately 590 tribal nations with original tribal names. Of these tribes, approximately 150 are extinct. Because most of the tribes were nomadic, he placed the names of the tribes in locations where the tribes were before they were pushed out by European expansion. He varies the font size of the names of tribes to indicate their relative population size and land area they inhabited. In addition, about 150 tribes have their current name listed under their original name because many people do not know the original name that these tribes used to be called.

Carapella had not planned on making a Canadian map. He had encouraged another person in Canada to make map similar to his United States map, but that did not work out, so he went ahead and made a Canadian map. The Canadian map identifies 212 tribes by their original names. There were many autonomous groups that he could not include because there was not enough room on the map to include the smallest groups. As with the United States map in which he has made many revisions, he expects to continue making revisions in his maps as new information comes in.

Today's borders between Canada and the United States and Mexico and the United States are arbitrary with respect to where tribal areas used to be. For example, he estimates that there are about 24 tribes that have populations split by the Mexico-United States border. In constructing his map of Mexico, he noticed that the language and culture of tribes in Mexico are better preserved than the same tribes on the United States side of the border. He speculates that the reason may be that there was a greater effort by the American government to relocate children into American Indian boarding schools.

By early 2015, Carapella had completed a map of Alaska and subsequently created a map of all the Indian tribes in North America without borders, which identifies over 1000 tribes. By late 2015, Carapella had completed a borderless map of tribes of South America. In the future, he also would like to make an "old-fashioned driving atlas" in which he can focus on different areas in much more detail.
