= Turtle Island News =

Canadian newspaper in Ontario

- February 1, 2006 Turtle Island News
- Type: Weekly newspaper
- Publisher: Lynda Powless
- Founded: 1994
- Headquarters: 2208 Chiefswood Road, N0A 1M0
- Website: https://theturtleislandnews.com/

Turtle Island News is a weekly community newspaper, published in Ohsweken, Ontario, Canada. The Turtle Island News also covers First Nation and aboriginal issues across North America.

== History ==
The newspaper was founded in 1994 by Lynda Powless. The name Turtle Island News is a reference to the Turtle Island.

== See also ==
- Tekawennake, discontinued newspaper in Ohsweken, Ontario.
- Two Row Times, weekly publication in Ohsweken, Ontario.
