= Buddy Kofoid =

American racing driver

Michael "Buddy" Kofoid
- Born: Michael Kofoid Penngrove, California, U.S.

USAC National Midget Series career
- Debut season: 2018
- Current team: Keith Kunz/Curb-Agajanian Motorsports
- Car number: 67
- Engine: Toyota
- Crew chief: Jarrett Martin
- Championships: 2 (2021, 2022)
- Wins: 36
- Best finish: 1st in 2021, 2022
- Finished last season: 1st

Previous series
- 2019 to present: POWRi Lucas Oil National Midget Series

Championship titles
- 2021-2022: USAC National Midget Series

NASCAR FedEx Freight Truck Series career
- 2 races run over 1 year
- 2022 position: 45th
- Best finish: 45th (2022)
- First race: 2022 Pinty's Truck Race on Dirt (Bristol Dirt)
- Last race: 2022 Clean Harbors 150 (Knoxville)
Wins	Top tens	Poles
0	0	0

ARCA Menards Series career
- 1 race run over 1 year
- Best finish: 71st (2022)
- First race: 2022 Atlas 100 (Illinois State Fairgrounds)
Wins	Top tens	Poles
0	1	0
- Statistics up to date as of November 5, 2022.

Michael "Buddy" Kofoid is an American professional dirt track and stock car racing driver. He competes full-time in the USAC National Midget Series and POWRi Lucas Oil National Midget Series, driving for Keith Kunz Motorsports. He is the 2021 and 2022 USAC National Midget Series champion. He also competed part-time in the NASCAR Camping World Truck Series, driving the No. 51 Toyota Tundra for Kyle Busch Motorsports, and part-time in the ARCA Menards Series, driving the No. 15 Toyota Camry for Venturini Motorsports. He also has competed with the NOS Energy Drink World of Outlaws Sprint car Series. He collected his first win at Huset's Speedway on June 23, 2022.

== Racing career ==
Kofoid began racing at the age of five, driving outlaw cars. He began driving sprint cars after receiving his first one when he was ten. He was the youngest driver to win a sprint car A-Main in the New Zealand National Sprint Car Series in 2013, at eleven years old. He competed full-time in the Western Sprint Tour when he was 13, finishing second in the final standings. He won a sprint car race at Placerville Speedway in 2016, which made him the youngest person in history to win at the track. Throughout most of his career, Kofoid primarily has competed in sprint car and midget car racing events, and occasionally late model races.

=== United States Auto Club ===
Kofoid attempted to make his USAC National Midget Series debut in 2018, but failed to qualify. In 2019, he joined Keith Kunz Motorsports for a part-time effort. He won in his first career national midget car debut, at Jacksonville Speedway. On December 14, 2019, Kofoid signed a full time effort in the USAC National Midget Series with Keith Kunz Motorsports in 2020, and compete for Rookie of the Year honors. He pulled off an impressive season, scoring three wins, fourteen top-fives, and 22 top-tens. He finished fourth in the final standings, and won Rookie of the Year. He had a breakout season in 2021, finishing inside the top-ten in all but three races. He won the championship with six wins, 28 top-fives, and 37 top-tens. He won two more titles that season, the USAC Indiana Midget Week, and the Make-A-Wish Trophy Cup. As of 2022, Kofoid will continue to race full time with KKM, and defend for a second championship.

=== POWRi Midget Racing ===
Kofoid made his POWRi Midget Racing debut in 2019, driving in two races. He finished second and third in both races. He drove in 16 races for KKM in 2020. Despite not driving in four of the races, he managed to finish fourth in final standings, with seven wins, twelve top-fives, and twelve top-tens. He ran half of the season in 2021, scoring nine wins, fourteen top-fives, and fifteen top-tens. As of 2022, he will continue running part-time for KKM.

=== Late models ===
In 2021, Kofoid made his debut in late model racing. He ran two races for Racing Dynamiks, finishing twelfth in his first race. He finished third in his second late model start at the Nashville Fairgrounds Speedway.

=== NASCAR K&N Pro Series West ===
In 2018, Kofoid signed with Gary Thackeray, and drove in a one off race with his team in the NASCAR K&N Pro Series West at the Las Vegas Motor Speedway Dirt Track. He started fifteenth and finished 21st due to a mechanical issue.

=== NASCAR Camping World Truck Series ===
On March 31, 2022, it was announced that Kofoid will make his NASCAR Camping World Truck Series debut at the 2022 Pinty's Truck Race on Dirt, driving for Kyle Busch Motorsports. Kofoid will drive with the same chassis that Martin Truex Jr. drove in the 2021 Pinty's Truck Race on Dirt, where he led 105 laps and won the race. Kofoid started 32nd due to an overheating issue during qualifying races. He quickly made his way to the front, and ran as high as third in the final stage. He finished 27th, after spinning in turn 2. Fellow driver Derek Kraus ran into the back of Kofoid's truck as he was trying to avoid the wreck.

=== ARCA Menards Series ===
On August 9, 2022, it was announced that Kofoid would make his ARCA Menards Series debut at the Illinois State Fairgrounds Racetrack, driving the No. 15 for Venturini Motorsports.

=== Sprint Car and Midget Racing in New Zealand ===
Throughout 2018 and 2019, Kofoid raced throughout New Zealand in Sprint Cars with Daniel Anderson Racing. This trip proved successful, as he came away with the New Zealand Sprint Car Title in 2019.

During the 2024/25 season Kofoid again raced in New Zealand but this time in a Midget, driving for Trent Way Motorsport. It was another extremely successful trip, which included wins in the Bay Superstars 30 Lapper and the Bay 51, both at Baypark Speedway, followed by the 50 Lap Classic on the 2nd of January, for his first ever win at Western Springs Speedway. Then two nights later, on the 4th of January 2025, Kofoid won the NZ Midget Championship, also held at Western Springs.

== Personal life ==
Kofoid is a fan of 20 time World of Outlaws champion Steve Kinser and NASCAR drivers Kyle Larson and Dale Earnhardt Jr. Kofoid is currently a member of the Toyota Racing Development program.

== Motorsports career results ==
=== NASCAR ===
(key) (Bold – Pole position awarded by qualifying time. Italics – Pole position earned by points standings or practice time. * – Most laps led.)

==== Camping World Truck Series ====
NASCAR Camping World Truck Series results
Year	Team	No.	Make	1	2	3	4	5	6	7	8	9	10	11	12	13	14	15	16	17	18	19	20	21	22	23	NCWTC	Pts	Ref
2022	Kyle Busch Motorsports	51	Toyota	DAY	LVS	ATL	COA	MAR	BRI; 27	DAR	KAN	TEX	CLT	GTW	SON	KNX; 11	NSH	MOH	POC	IRP	RCH	KAN	BRI	TAL	HOM	PHO	45th	40	

==== K&N Pro Series West ====
NASCAR K&N Pro Series West results
Year	Team	No.	Make	1	2	3	4	5	6	7	8	9	10	11	12	13	14	NKNPSWC	Pts	Ref
2018	Gary Thackeray	83	Chevy	KCR	TUS	TUS	OSS	CNS	SON	DCS	IOW	EVG	GTW	LVS; 21	MER	AAS	KCR	58th	23	

=== ARCA Menards Series ===
(key) (Bold – Pole position awarded by qualifying time. Italics – Pole position earned by points standings or practice time. * – Most laps led. ** – All laps led.)

ARCA Menards Series results
Year	Team	No.	Make	1	2	3	4	5	6	7	8	9	10	11	12	13	14	15	16	17	18	19	20	AMSC	Pts	Ref
2022	Venturini Motorsports	15	Toyota	DAY	PHO	TAL	KAN	CLT	IOW	BLN	ELK	MOH	POC	IRP	MCH	GLN	ISF; 2	MLW	DSF	KAN	BRI	SLM	TOL	71st	42	

=== CARS Pro Late Model Tour ===
(key)

CARS Pro Late Model Tour results
Year	Team	No.	Make	1	2	3	4	5	6	7	8	9	10	11	12	CPLMTC	Pts	Ref
2022	Wilson Motorsports	24K	Toyota	CRW	HCY	GPS	FCS	TCM	HCY	ACE	MMS; 5	TCM	ACE	SBO; 4	CRW	18th	57	
