= Kofoid =

Kofoid is a surname. Notable people with the surname include:

- Buddy Kofoid (born 2001), American racing driver
- Charles Atwood Kofoid (1865–1947), American zoologist
