= CKRZ-FM =

First Nations community radio station in Ohsweken, Ontario

Coordinates: 43°04′01″N 80°07′28″W

- Ohsweken, Ontario; Canada
- Broadcast area: Six Nations/Brant, Midwestern Ontario
- Frequency: 100.3 MHz
- Branding: 100.3 CKRZ-FM

Programming
- Format: Community radio

Ownership
- Owner: Southern Onkwehon:we Nishinabec Indigenous Communications Society

History
- First air date: 1991

Technical information
- Class: A1
- ERP: 5,000 watts
- HAAT: 46 metres (151 ft)

Links
- Website: ckrzfm.com

CKRZ-FM (100.3 MHz) is a community radio station in Ohsweken, Ontario. Owned by the Southern Onkwehon:we Nishinabec Indigenous Communications Society (SONICS), the station airs programmes for the region's Six Nations and Mississauga First Nations. Programs are in English and several indigenous languages, including news, talk and music.

In addition to its FM over-the-air broadcasts, CKRZ is available on Rogers Cable channel 951 in Brantford, Kitchener, Woodstock and London.

== History ==
=== Founding ===
In 1987, permission was granted from the Canadian Radio-television and Telecommunications Commission to begin building a community radio station in Ohsweken. CKRZ signed on the air in 1991. The studios and offices were located at 1721 Chiefswood Road.

CKRZ's programs are multilingual, broadcasting in Cayuga, Mohawk and other indigenous languages as well as English. On Sundays, CKRZ hosts a radio bingo with jackpots of up to $16,000.

=== Financial problems ===
On January 29, 2009, the station announced that due to a rising debt load of more than $100,000 and reduced advertising revenue, it would leave the air on February 1, 2009. At an emergency meeting of SONICS' board and membership, the members subsequently voted to continue the station, as they considered it an asset to the community.

Walt Juchniewicz, a broadcast engineer from Hamilton who had worked with the station in the past, offered to donate services and equipment to help upgrade the station's studios. Juchniewicz called Six Nations one of the nicest communities he had ever worked in, adding that "there are a lot of good people at that station and it's got a better chance of recovering than some of the bigger broadcasters that are in trouble now, too."

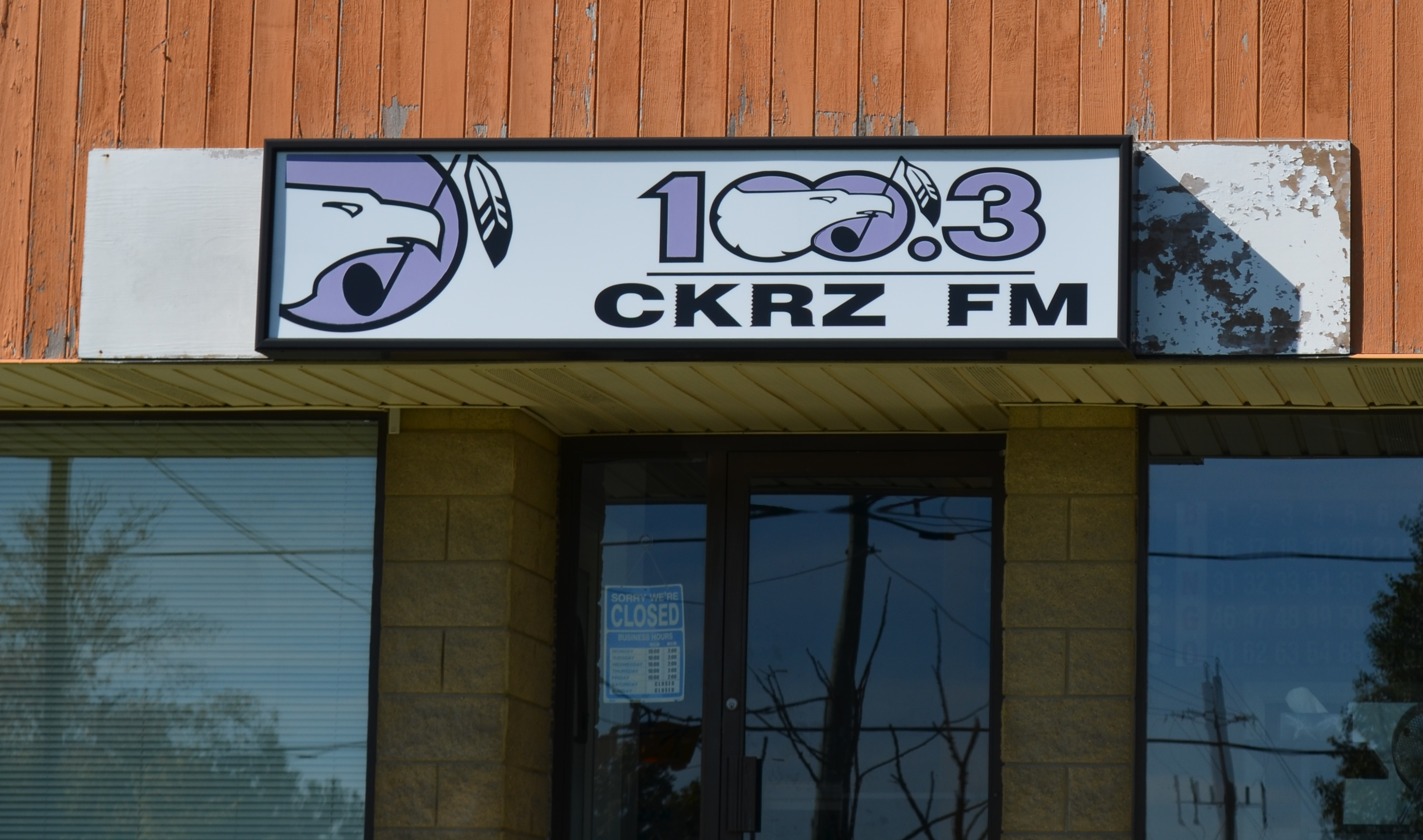

The station resumed broadcasting on February 12. It was temporarily reduced to prerecorded automated programming, with a single live personality to read news reports and community announcements. This was done to give SONICS time to eliminate the station's accumulated debt.
