= CJKS-FM =

Radio station in Ohsweken, Ontario

- Ohsweken, Ontario; Canada
- Broadcast area: Six Nations/Brant, Midwestern Ontario
- Frequency: 93.5 MHz
- Branding: Jukasa Radio

Programming
- Language: English

Ownership
- Owner: Arrow Radio

History
- First air date: January 13, 2016

Technical information
- Licensing authority: CRTC
- ERP: 75 watts
- HAAT: 80 metres
- Transmitter coordinates: 43°4′12.00″N 80°1′8.04″W

Links
- Webcast: ca2.radioboss.fm:8018/index.html
- Website: jukasaradio.ca

CJKS-FM (branded as Jukasa Radio) is a Canadian radio station broadcasting at 93.5 FM in Ohsweken, Ontario, as a Type B Native FM radio station.

The station first went on the air on 13 January 2016 and broadcasts local news and information from Six Nations of the Grand River to that community. Its music format includes Top 40, Hip hop, and R&B. Jukasa Radio simulcasts on the internet through Radioboss at http://ca2.radioboss.fm:8018/index.html?sid=1

Jukasa Radio is owned and operated by Arrow Radio, a not-for-profit corporation controlled by its board of directors.
