= Ohsweken Speedway =

Dirt track in Ontario, Canada

The Big O
- Location: 1987 Chiefswood Road; Ohsweken, Ontario; Canada
- Coordinates: 43°04′58″N 80°06′47″W
- Capacity: 8,000
- Owner: Styres Family
- Operator: Glenn Styres & Curt Styres
- Broke ground: 1994
- Opened: 1996
- Major events: Current: World of Outlaw Sprint Car Series Federated Auto Parts Ohsweken Showdown (2025-present); Northern Sprint Car Nationals (2023–present); Former: NASCAR Canada Series; Northern Summer Nationals (2022–2024); World of Outlaws Sprint Car Series; Six Nations Showdown (2007–2017); Super DIRTcar Series; Triple Crown Showdown (2015, 2017, 2020); World of Outlaws Late Model Series; Six Nations 50 (2008–2009); Canadian Sprint Car Nationals (2005–2022)

Oval (1996–present)
- Surface: Clay
- Length: 0.375 mi (0.604 km)
- Turns: 4
- Banking: 15 degrees
- Race lap record: 12.047 sec (Kraig Kinser, Steve Kinser Racing, 2010, 410 Sprint Car)

The Ohsweken Speedway is a 0.375 miles (0.604 km) dirt track in the village of Ohsweken, Ontario, Canada. Ohsweken’s weekly Friday night racing program runs from May to September each year, featuring 360 Sprint Cars, Crate Sprint Cars, Thunder Stocks, and Mini Stocks, while the season finishes each year with the annual Northern Sprint Car Nationals. Ohsweken Speedway also hosts weekly Micro Sprint racing on Thursday nights, and hosted the World of Outlaws Sprint Car Series from 2007 until 2017. The World of Outlaws Sprint Car Series returned in 2025.

== History ==
In 1994 race car driver Glenn Styres built the 0.375 miles (0.604 km) mile oval Ohsweken Speedway on 80 acres (32 ha) of Styres family-owned land on the Six Nations of the Grand River First Nation Reserve southeast of Brantford, Ontario. The track has been continuously expanded in each year of its existence.

The track’s seating capacity was increased to over 8,000 in 2008 and a project was conducted to install Musco lighting, illuminating the speedway to allow the World of Outlaws Sprint Car series to run at the facility.

== World of Outlaws - Federated Auto Parts Showdown at Ohsweken ==
The prestigious World of Outlaws Sprint Car Series made its first trip to Ohsweken Speedway for the first running of the Six Nations Showdown on July 25, 2007. Jason Sides won the inaugural event. In 2011, NASCAR Sprint Cup Champion Tony Stewart won his first career World of Outlaws race at Ohsweken and repeated the victory in 2012.

Season	Date	Driver
2007	July 25	(United States) Jason Sides
2008	July 22	Rainout
2009	July 28	(United States) Jason Meyers
2009	July 29	(United States) Jason Sides
2010	July 30	(United States) Jason Sides
2010	August 1	(United States) Donny Schatz
2011	July 27	(United States) Tony Stewart
2012	July 31	(United States) Tony Stewart
2013	July 30	(United States) Donny Schatz
2014	July 29	(United States) Donny Schatz
2015	July 28	(Canada) Stewart Friesen
2016	July 26	(United States) Donny Schatz
2017	July 25	(United States) Logan Schuchart
2025	May 14th	(United States) David Gravel
	May 15th	(United States) David Gravel

== Photo gallery ==
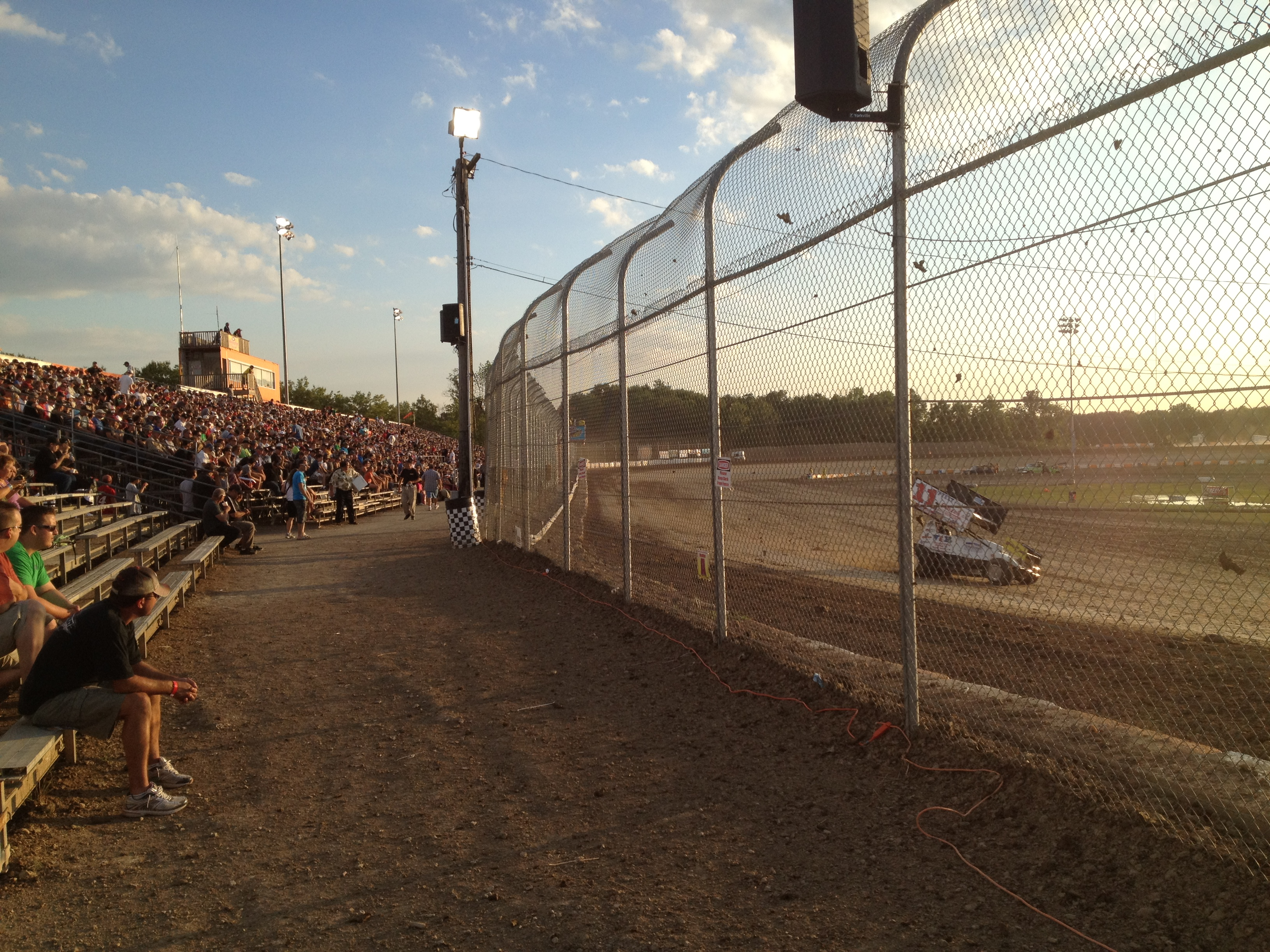
Front straight and grandstands.

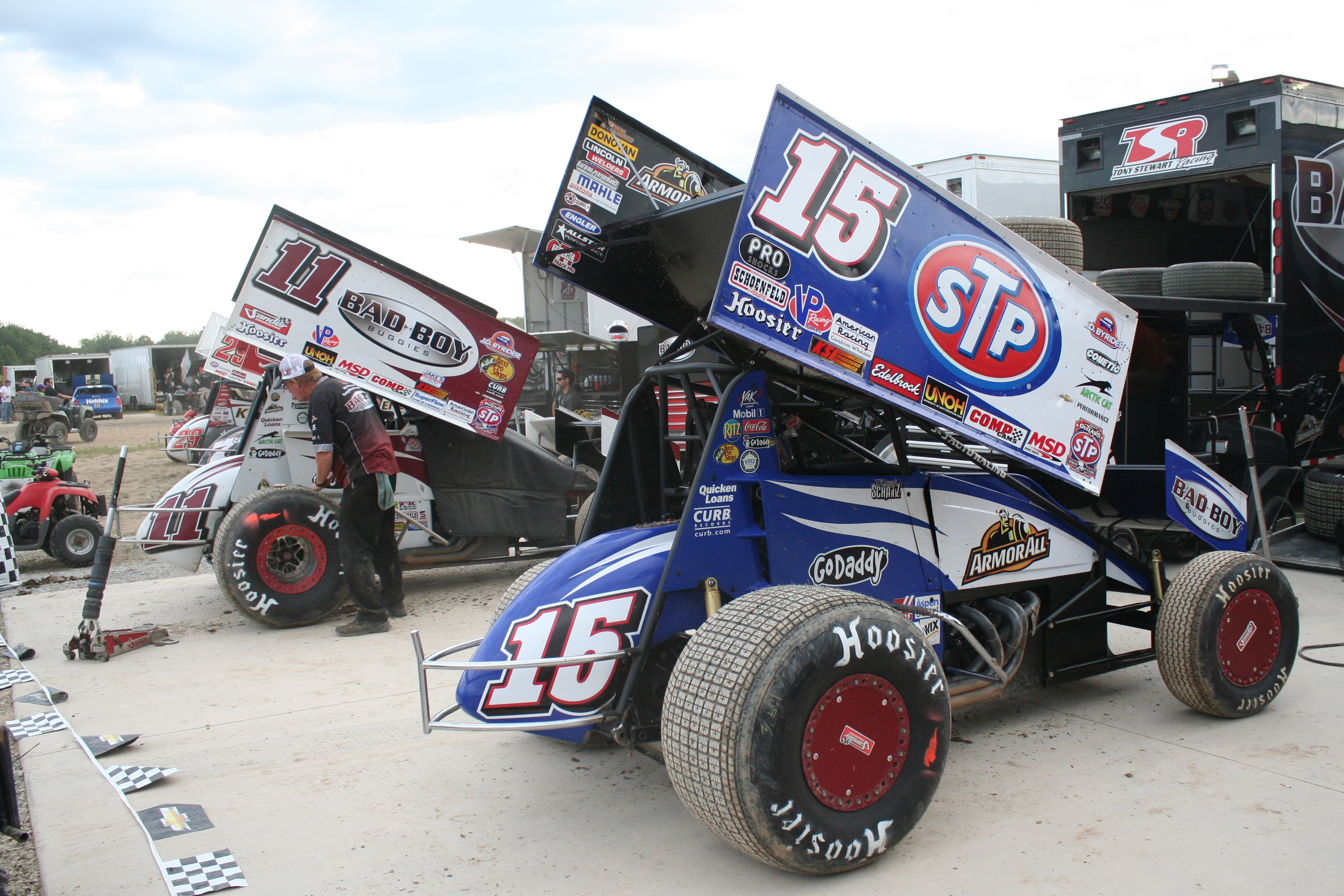
Steve Kinser and Donny Schatz sprint cars in the pits.

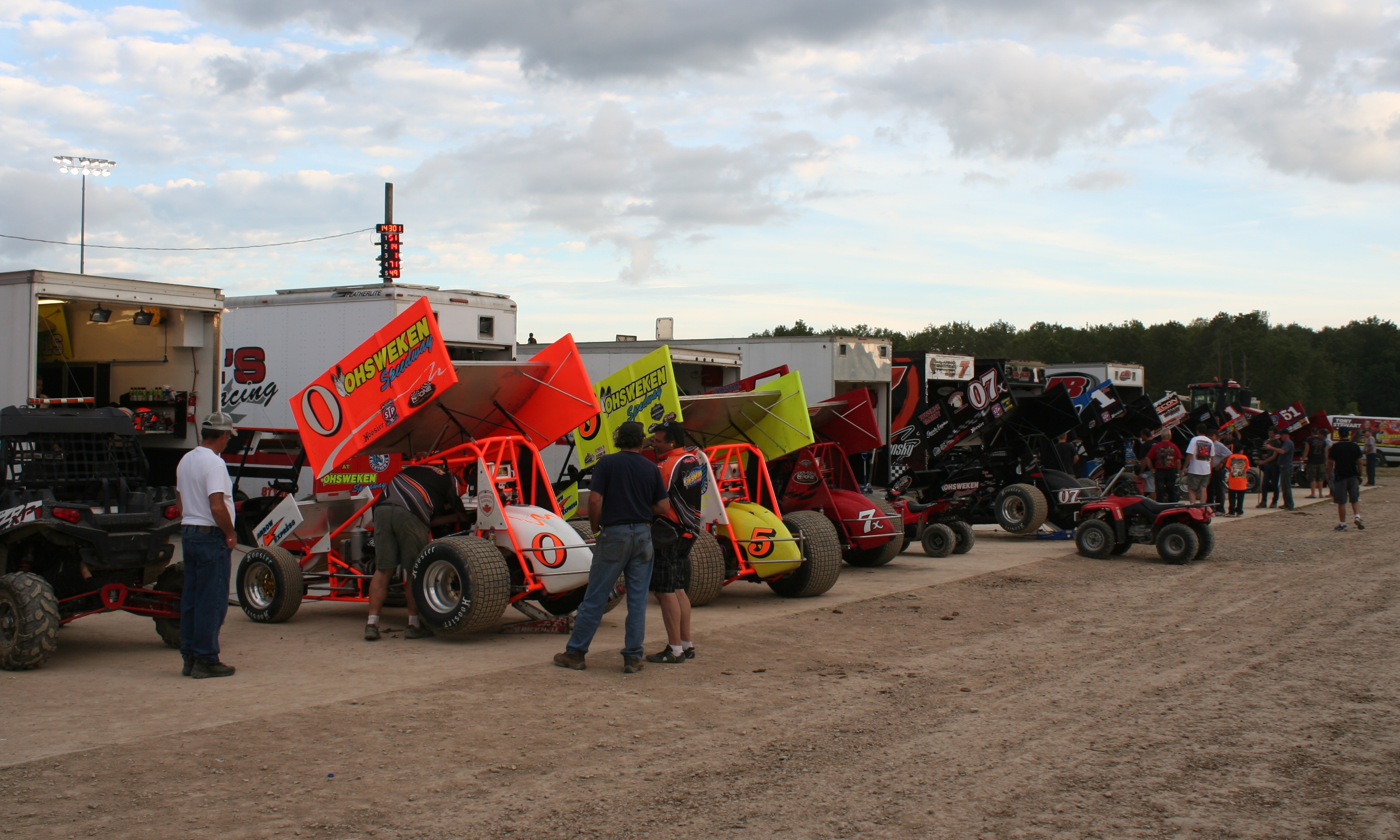
The pits.

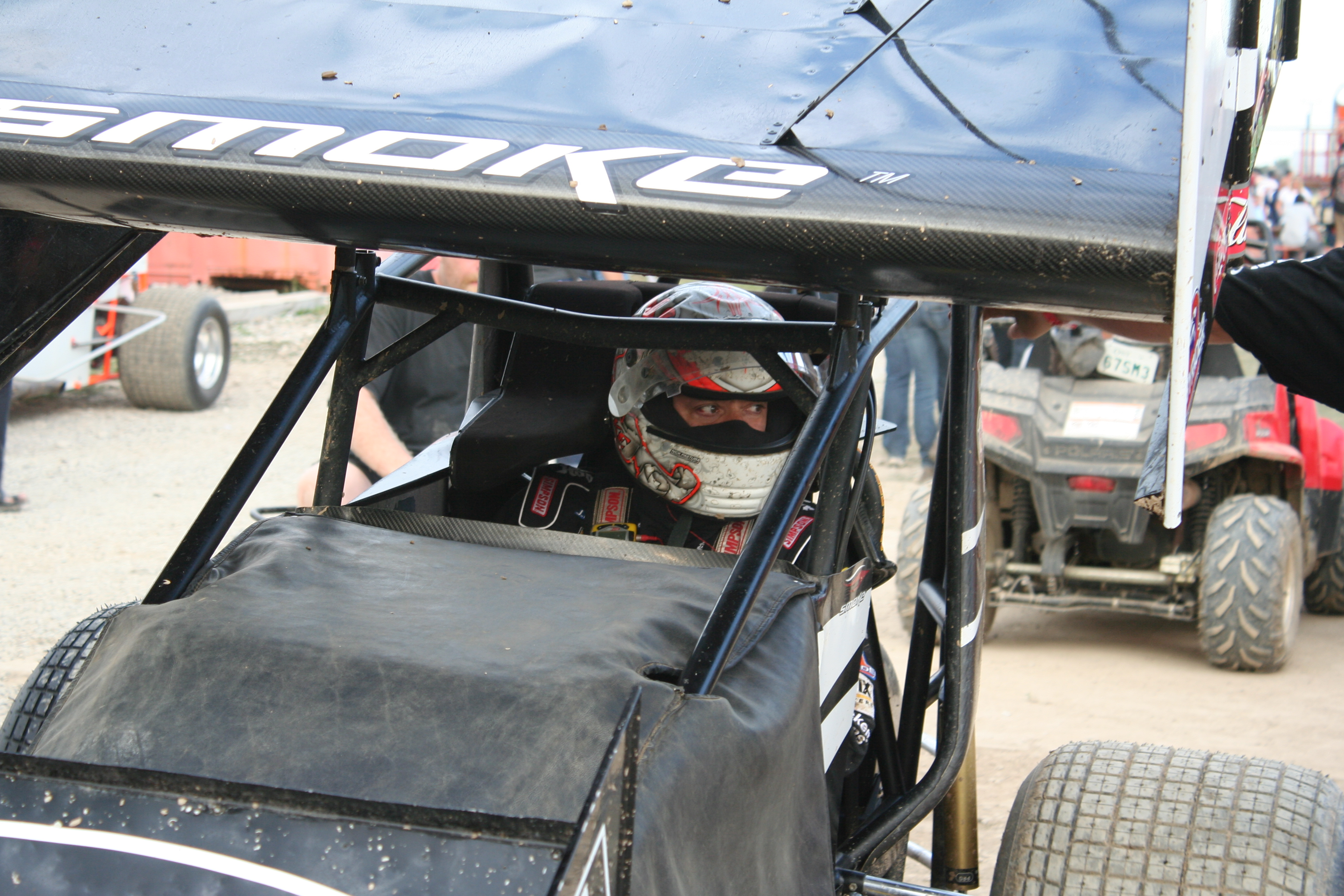
Tony Stewart at the Six Nations Showdown World of Outlaws event.

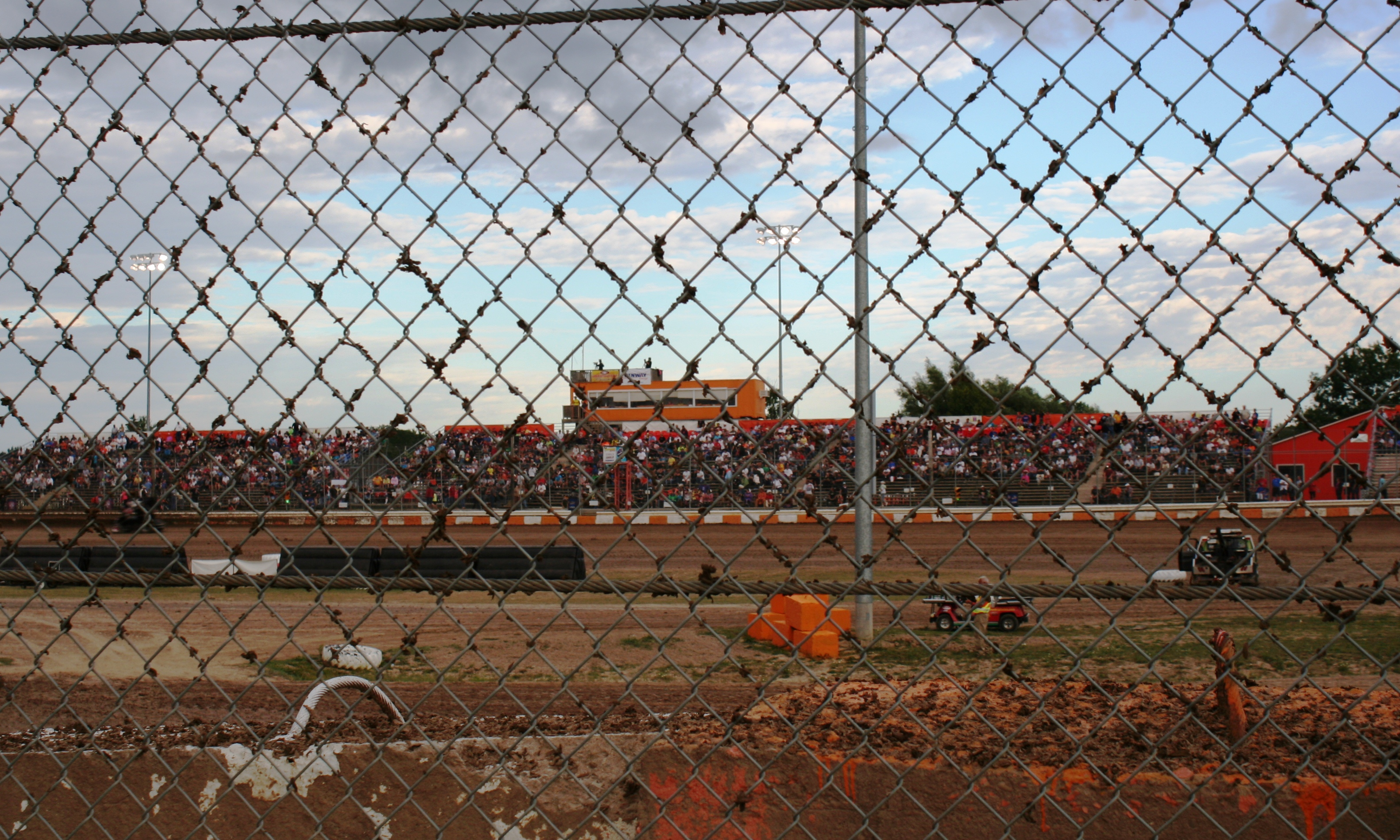
View of main grandstand from backstraight through clay on the crash fence.

== See also ==
- Dirt track racing
- List of dirt track ovals in Canada
- Sprint car racing
- Short track motor racing
- Auto racing
- Race track
