= Junction Motor Speedway =

Dirt oval in McCool Junction, Nebraska

Coordinates: 40.744331°N 97.612538°W

Junction Motor Speedway is a recently constructed 3/8 mile dirt oval that is located just west of McCool Junction, Nebraska, United States, along U.S. Route 81. The track is currently owned and promoted by Delmar Friesen. The track cost a total of two million dollars to construct.
