= Placerville Speedway =

Speedway race track

- Location: Placerville, California (El Dorado County Fairgrounds)
- Coordinates: 38°43′34″N 120°49′56″W
- Opened: 1965
- Former names: Hangtown Speedway
- Major events: World of Outlaws sprint cars USAC National midgets USAC Western midgets King of the West-NARC Sprint Car Racing Series
- Website: placervillespeedway.com

1/4 mile oval
- Surface: dirt
- Length: 0.25 mi (0.40 km)

Placerville Speedway is a 1/4 mile dirt track located in Placerville at the El Dorado County fairgrounds in the Sierra Nevada foothills of eastern California.

== History ==
The track began in 1965 as "Hangtown Speedway".

On November 20, 2019, the speedway held the Elk Grove Ford Hangtown 100, a 100-lap, $20,000-to-win USAC National Midget Series race which was won by Kyle Larson. It was the first time that the national midgets raced at the track. That same year, the World of Outlaws sprint cars made their first appearance at the track in approximately twenty years. In 2020, the weekly races were broadcast on FloRacing as the track was not allowed to have fans due to the global pandemic.

== Notable drivers ==
- Kyle Larson - made his first sprint car start and won his first sprint car feature at the track. Larson considers the speedway to be his home track. Larson and brother-in-law Brad Sweet both co-own series that participate there and promote those events on the schedule (NARC - Sweet, High Limit by both). In October 2025, Larson became a partner in promoting the Hangtown 100.

== Track Records ==
As of July 2025, the current track records at Placerville Speedway are as follows:

Category	Time	Driver	Vehicle	Date
Oval (1965-Present): 0.40 km
Winged Sprint Car	0:09.913	Tim Kaeding	Sprint Car	March 27th, 2004
Midget car racing	0:11.397	Tanner Thorson	Midget Car	November 18th, 2021
Wingless Sprint Car	0:11.658	Kaleb Montgomery	Sprint Car	July 10th, 2021
Late model racing	0:13.274	Matt Davis	Late Model	April 20th, 2019
