= Ohsweken, Ontario =

Ohsweken name in indigenous languages: Oswé:gęˀ (Cayuga); Oshwé:ken (Mohawk); Oshwe·kʌ́· (Oneida); Ohcwé·gęh (Onondaga); Swe:gë’ (Seneca); Swekęˀ (Tuscarora)
- Location within Ontario Location within Canada
- Coordinates: 43°04′09″N 80°07′03″W
- Country: Canada
- Province: Ontario

Government
  - Governing Body: Six Nations Band Council
  - MP: Larry Brock (Conservative)
  - MPP: Will Bouma (Conservative)

Area
  - Total: 75 km^{2} (29 sq mi)
- Elevation: 200 m (660 ft)

Population (2018)
  - Total: Approx. 1,500
- Roughly 10% of Six Nations' total population
- Time zone: UTC−5 (Eastern (EST))
  - Summer (DST): UTC−4 (EDT)
- Postal code: N0A
- Area code: Area code 519
- GNBC Code: FCGSY
- Website: http://www.sixnations.ca

Ohsweken (/oʊʃˈwiːkɛn/) is a dispersed rural community located within the Six Nations of the Grand River, in Brant County, Ontario, Canada. Approximately 300 of the 2,700 homes on the reserve are in Ohsweken, and it is the site of the reserve governmental and administrative offices.

== History ==
From approximately 1840 to 1865, the Six Nations Confederacy council met in a log building near Middleport, Ontario. In 1856, against protests from the Onondaga chiefs, a strong-willed superintendent from the Indian Department, Jasper Tough Gilkison, established a council building in what is present-day Ohsweken, about 6 km (3.7 mi) south-west of Middleport. Gilkison later retired in 1891 under pressure from Prime Minister Sir John A. Macdonald for incompetence. Though the Onondaga chiefs argued that they should establish their own centre of government, the village of Ohsweken quickly developed in the surrounding area.

== Arts and culture ==
=== Six Nations Fall Fair ===
Six Nations Annual Fall Fair takes place often the first week of September and is one of the oldest Agricultural Fairs in Ontario. Celebrations include the Miss Six Nations pageant, a powwow, horse races, and a derby.

=== Bread and Cheese (Independence Day) ===
In appreciation of the Six Nations' support for Great Britain during the American Revolution and the War of 1812, Queen Victoria began an annual tradition of giving blankets to their community. The custom ended with Victoria's death in 1901.

In 1924, however, the council of the Six Nations decided to revive the practice, this time with gifts of bread and cheese, as a commemoration of the close ties between Six Nations and the British Crown. Every year, thousands of people stand in line to enter the Gaylord Powless Arena where they receive large squares of bread and cheese. The celebrations also include carnival rides and games, a parade from Chiefswood Park to the arena, and a street dance held by CKRZ-FM.

=== National Indigenous Peoples’ Day ===
The events take place at Chiefswood Park, celebrating National Indigenous Peoples’ Day and the summer solstice on June 21. June 21 is also the day of the Tom Longboat run. There are also festivities at Gage Park in Hamilton.

=== Grand River Champion of Champions Pow Wow ===
This annual Pow-wow, held since 1979, hosts over 400 dancers and drummers from across North America. It is held on the last weekend of July at Chiefswood Park. It features a variety of traditional Native dancing by different tribes, food, and crafts.

== Attractions ==
=== Veterans' Park ===
This park is at the corner of Fourth Line Road and Chiefswood Road. It features The Six Nations-Mississauga War Memorial, which commemorates the 200 First Nations soldiers who were killed during World War II. The soldiers fought in Dieppe, France, and Hong Kong, and were part of the Normandy Invasion in 1944.

=== Gaylord Powless Arena ===
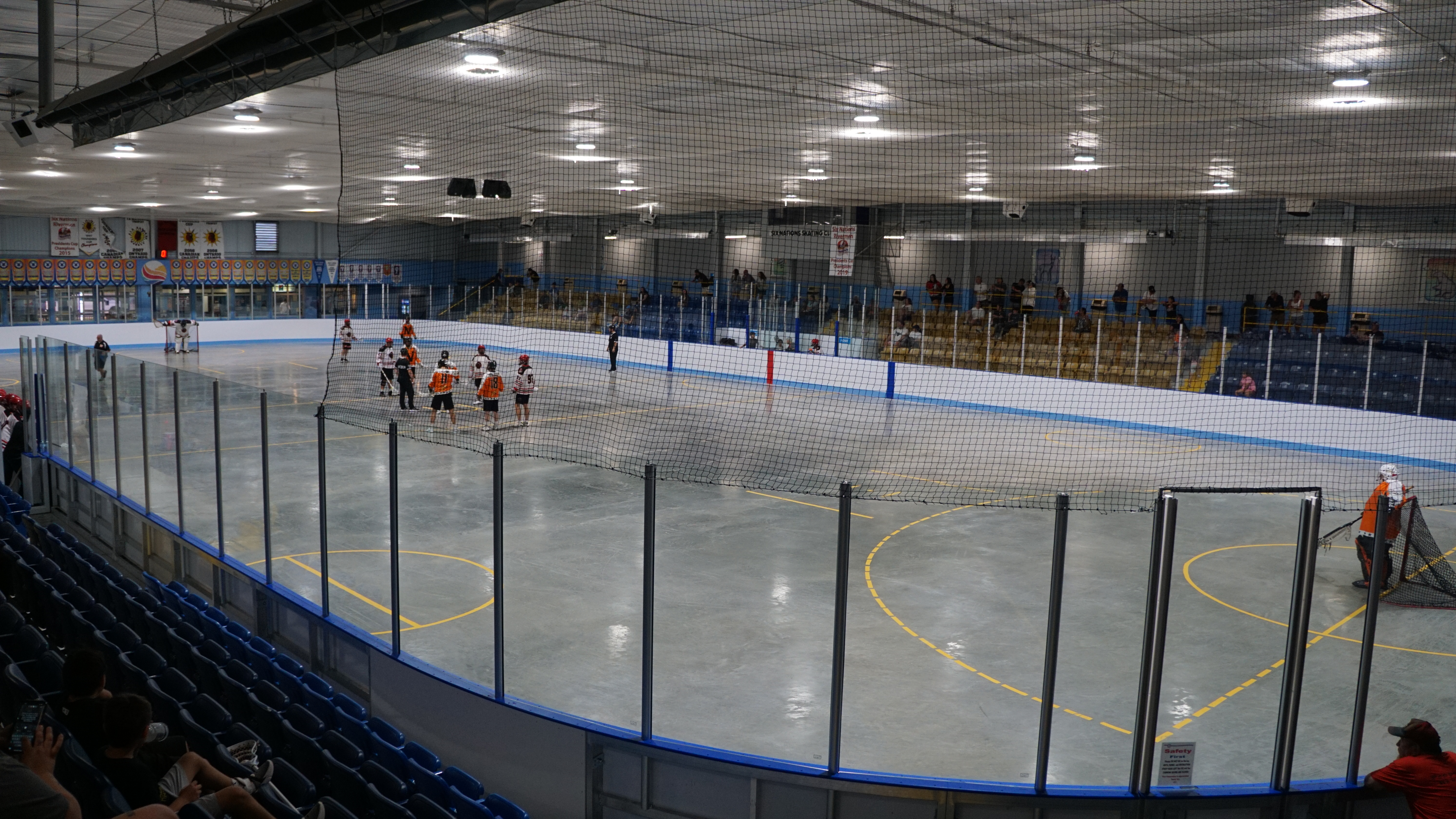
A Six Nations Rivermen game at the Gaylord Powless Arena

The Gaylord Powless Arena seats 648 with room for 200 standing. Originally constructed in 1972, it was renovated in 2005 and is regularly used for lacrosse, hockey and figure skating. On Bread and Cheese Day, the arena serves for distribution of large chunks of bread and cheese.

=== Speedway ===
Ohsweken Speedway is a 3/8 mile dirt oval auto raceway located in Ohsweken.

== Education ==
Six Nations Polytechnic is a Six Nations of the Grand River First Nation community-controlled school.

== Media ==
The town is serviced by two community newspapers, Turtle Island News and Two Row Times. Both newspapers feature mostly local news but also include stories related to broader First Nations and Canadian issues. CKRZ-FM, a community radio station, broadcasts a variety of programming including local news, music, language lessons and radio bingo. CJKS-FM, another local radio station, is known for their varieties of genres broadcast and dedicated Native American programming.

== Notable people ==
- Jay Silverheels
- Gary Farmer
- Graham Greene
- Daniel David Moses
- Stan Jonathan
- Brandon Montour
- Craig Point
- Cody Jamieson
