= McCool Junction, Nebraska =

Village in York County, Nebraska, United States

- Village
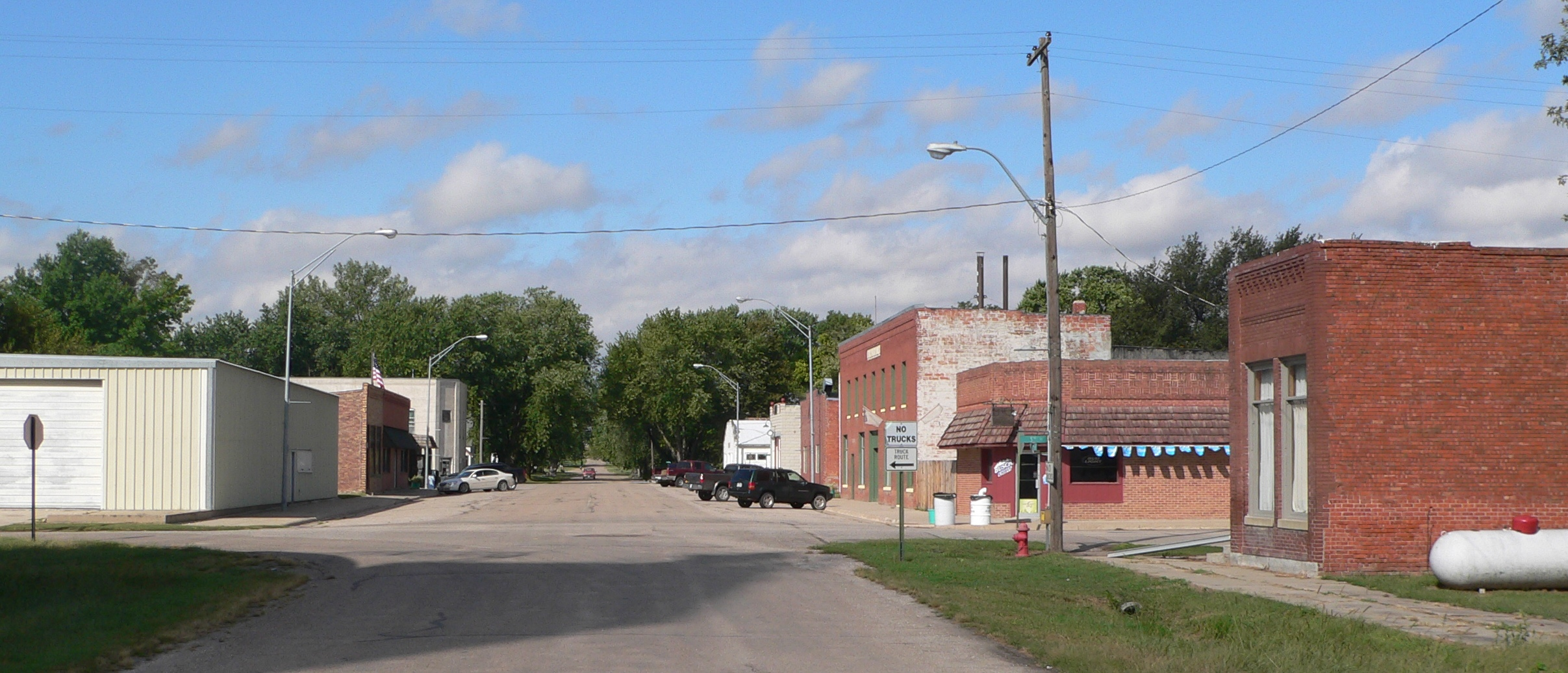
- Downtown McCool Junction: M Street, September 2010
- Motto: "The Magic City On the Blue"
- Location of McCool Junction, Nebraska
- Coordinates: 40°44′38″N 97°36′03″W
- Country: United States
- State: Nebraska
- County: York

Area
  - Total: 0.49 sq mi (1.26 km^{2})
  - Land: 0.48 sq mi (1.25 km^{2})
  - Water: 0.0039 sq mi (0.01 km^{2})
- Elevation: 1,578 ft (481 m)

Population (2020)
  - Total: 453
  - Density: 937.0/sq mi (361.78/km^{2})
- Time zone: UTC-6 (Central (CST))
  - Summer (DST): UTC-5 (CDT)
- ZIP code: 68401
- Area code: 402
- FIPS code: 31-29960
- GNIS feature ID: 2399290
- Website: www.mccooljunction-ne.com

McCool Junction is a village in York County, Nebraska, United States. As of the 2020 census, McCool Junction had a population of 453.

== History ==
McCool Junction, originally known as McCool, was platted in 1886 when the railroad was extended to that point. The city was named for Daniel McCool, a railroad official. By 1888 the town was at the junction of two railroads.

== Geography ==
According to the United States Census Bureau, the village has a total area of 0.47 square miles (1.22 km^{2}), all land.

== Demographics ==
Historical population
Census	Pop.	Note	%±
1890	204		—
1900	276		35.3%
1910	369		33.7%
1920	338		−8.4%
1930	356		5.3%
1940	272		−23.6%
1950	297		9.2%
1960	246		−17.2%
1970	289		17.5%
1980	404		39.8%
1990	372		−7.9%
2000	385		3.5%
2010	409		6.2%
2020	453		10.8%
U.S. Decennial Census

=== 2010 census ===
As of the census of 2010, there were 409 people, 162 households, and 121 families residing in the village. The population density was 870.2 inhabitants per square mile (336.0/km^{2}). There were 172 housing units at an average density of 366.0 per square mile (141.3/km^{2}). The racial makeup of the village was 96.1% White, 1.0% African American, 0.7% Native American, 0.7% Pacific Islander, 1.2% from other races, and 0.2% from two or more races. Hispanic or Latino of any race were 2.9% of the population.

There were 162 households, of which 39.5% had children under the age of 18 living with them, 59.9% were married couples living together, 9.3% had a female householder with no husband present, 5.6% had a male householder with no wife present, and 25.3% were non-families. 22.8% of all households were made up of individuals, and 8.6% had someone living alone who was 65 years of age or older. The average household size was 2.52 and the average family size was 2.93.

The median age in the village was 38.6 years. 29.1% of residents were under the age of 18; 3.9% were between the ages of 18 and 24; 26.5% were from 25 to 44; 26.7% were from 45 to 64; and 13.9% were 65 years of age or older. The gender makeup of the village was 50.9% male and 49.1% female.

=== 2000 census ===
As of the census of 2000, there were 385 people, 162 households, and 103 families residing in the village. The population density was 1,325.3 inhabitants per square mile (511.7/km^{2}). There were 170 housing units at an average density of 585.2 per square mile (225.9/km^{2}). The racial makeup of the village was 99.22% White, 0.52% from other races, and 0.26% from two or more races. Hispanic or Latino of any race were 1.56% of the population.

There were 162 households, out of which 34.0% had children under the age of 18 living with them, 58.0% were married couples living together, 4.9% had a female householder with no husband present, and 36.4% were non-families. 30.9% of all households were made up of individuals, and 14.8% had someone living alone who was 65 years of age or older. The average household size was 2.38 and the average family size was 3.06.

In the village, the population was spread out, with 28.1% under the age of 18, 5.2% from 18 to 24, 31.2% from 25 to 44, 22.1% from 45 to 64, and 13.5% who were 65 years of age or older. The median age was 35 years. For every 100 females, there were 101.6 males. For every 100 females age 18 and over, there were 102.2 males.

As of 2000 the median income for a household in the village was $38,875, and the median income for a family was $45,417. Males had a median income of $29,333 versus $17,321 for females. The per capita income for the village was $16,598. About 3.8% of families and 3.5% of the population were below the poverty line, including 6.1% of those under age 18 and 5.6% of those age 65 or over.

== Education ==
McCool Junction Public Schools is the area school district.

McCool Junction's school building was built in 1916, following the destruction of the previous building by fire. In the following years the school has added an elementary wing, two gyms, a music room, and another new elementary wing to the original building. Additional classrooms have been added in adjacent lots, known as North and East Campus.

High school sports include boys and girls cross country, girls volleyball, football, boys and girls basketball, boys and girls bowling and boys and girls track and field. The school's teams have won seven state championships: boys basketball (1985), volleyball (1986, 1999), girls basketball (2000), boys track and field (2009), girls cross country (2020), and football (2020).

== Recreation and events ==
Every summer, McCool Junction holds its annual Mustang Roundup Celebration. The event includes a parade and a community barbecue.

The McCool Community Improvement Foundation (MCIF) holds an annual philanthropy event known as Evening with the Stars. This includes a dinner and both a silent and a live auction of items that have been donated by local individuals and businesses. Proceeds are used to benefit the town school; the 2010 event raised over $50,000.

Hunting and fishing are popular among the residents of the town. Hunters chiefly pursue white-tailed deer, pheasant, quail, and raccoon. Local fishing is focused on catfish. Other game animals and fish are also found in the area.

McCool Junction is home to Junction Motor Speedway, a 3/8 mile dirt oval track. Auto races are held from late March through October.

== See also ==
- List of municipalities in Nebraska
