= Huset's Speedway =

Racetrack

Coordinates: 43.57059°N 96.5834°W

- Location: Brandon, South Dakota, United States
- Owner: Tod Quiring
- Broke ground: 1953
- Opened: 1954
- Major events: All Star Circuit of Champions; World of Outlaws $100,000-to-win 410 Sprint car show $250,000 Gold Cup
- Surface: dirt
- Length: 0.375 mi (0.604 km)
- Turns: 4

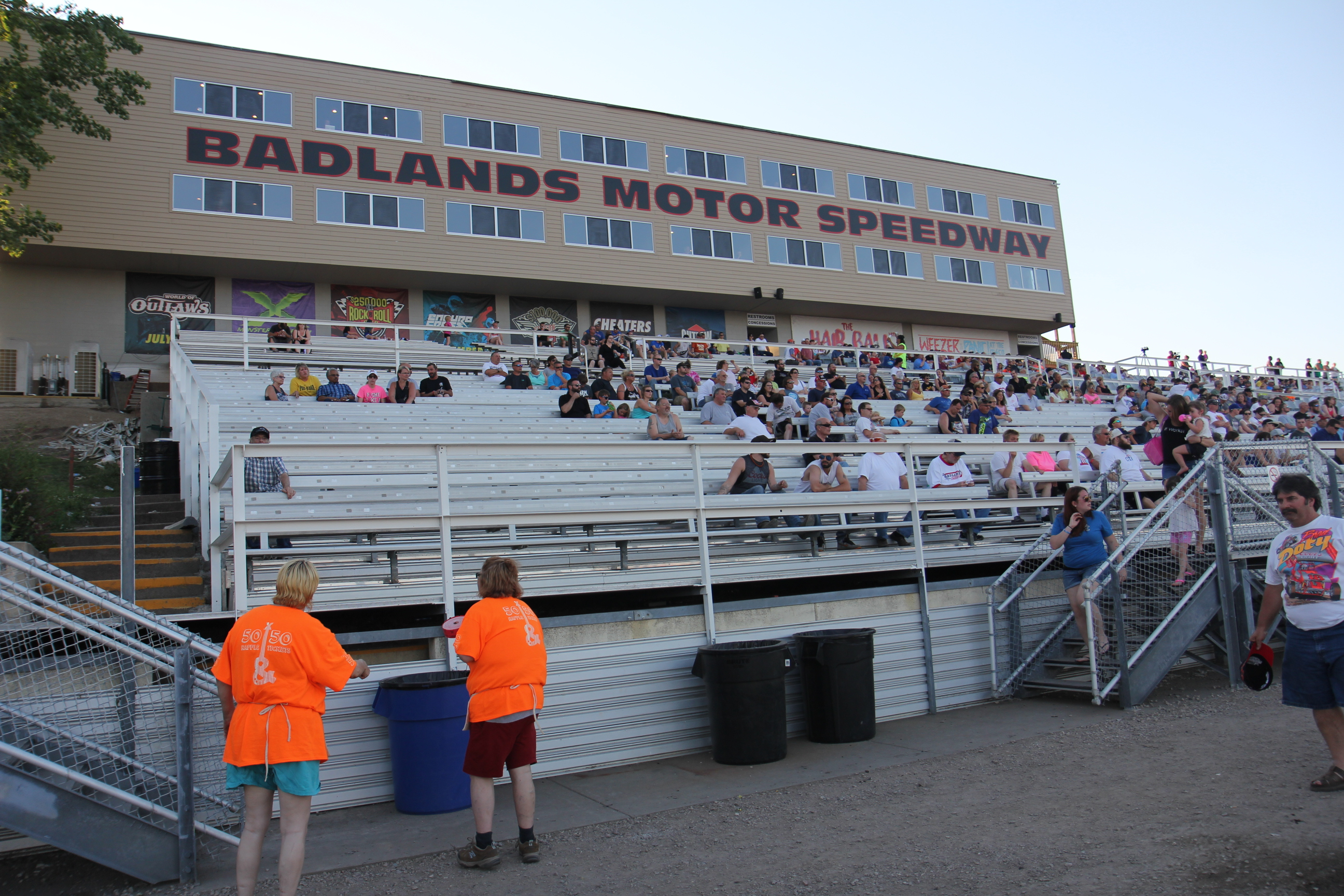
Upper grandstands

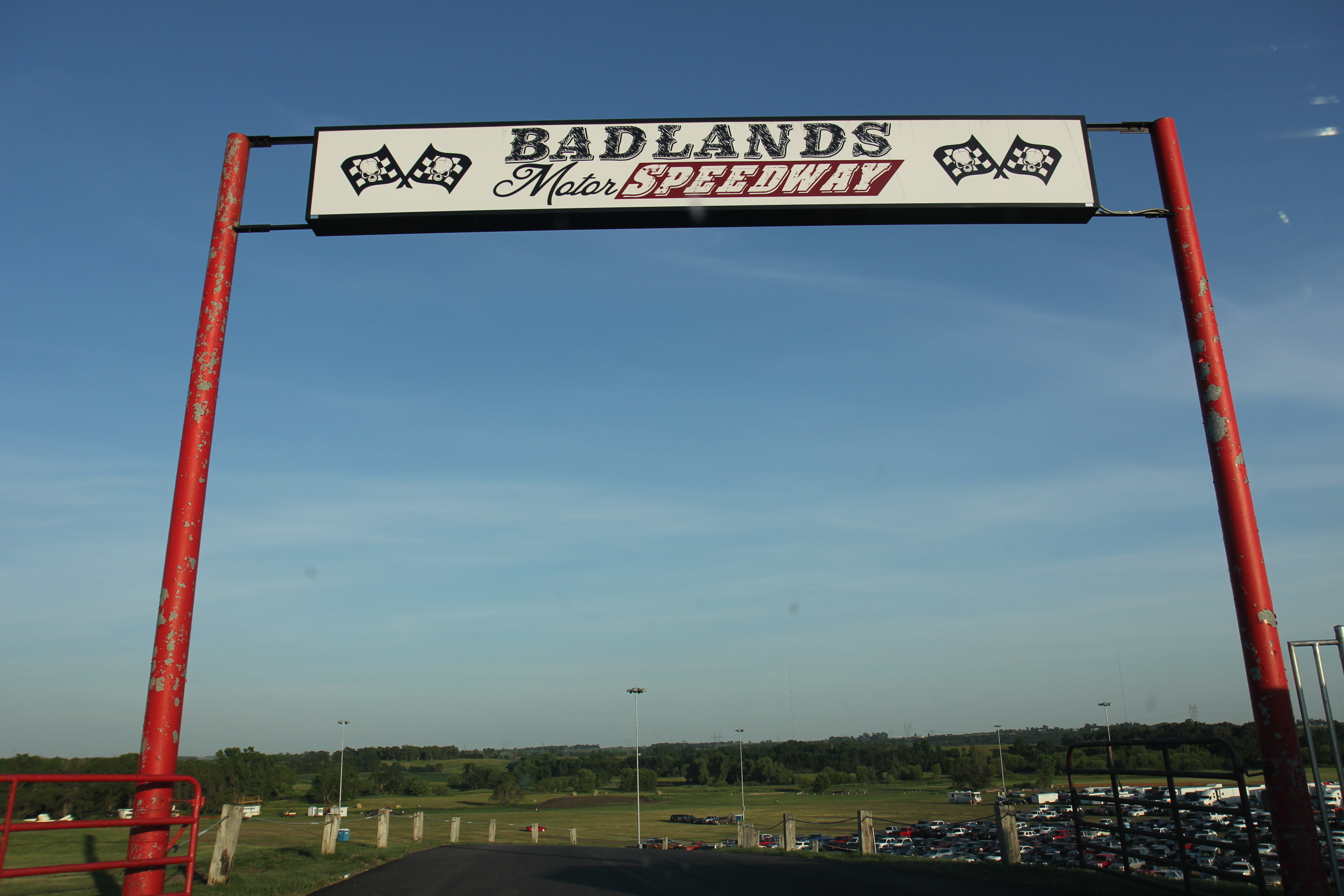
Entrance while named Badlands Motor Speedway

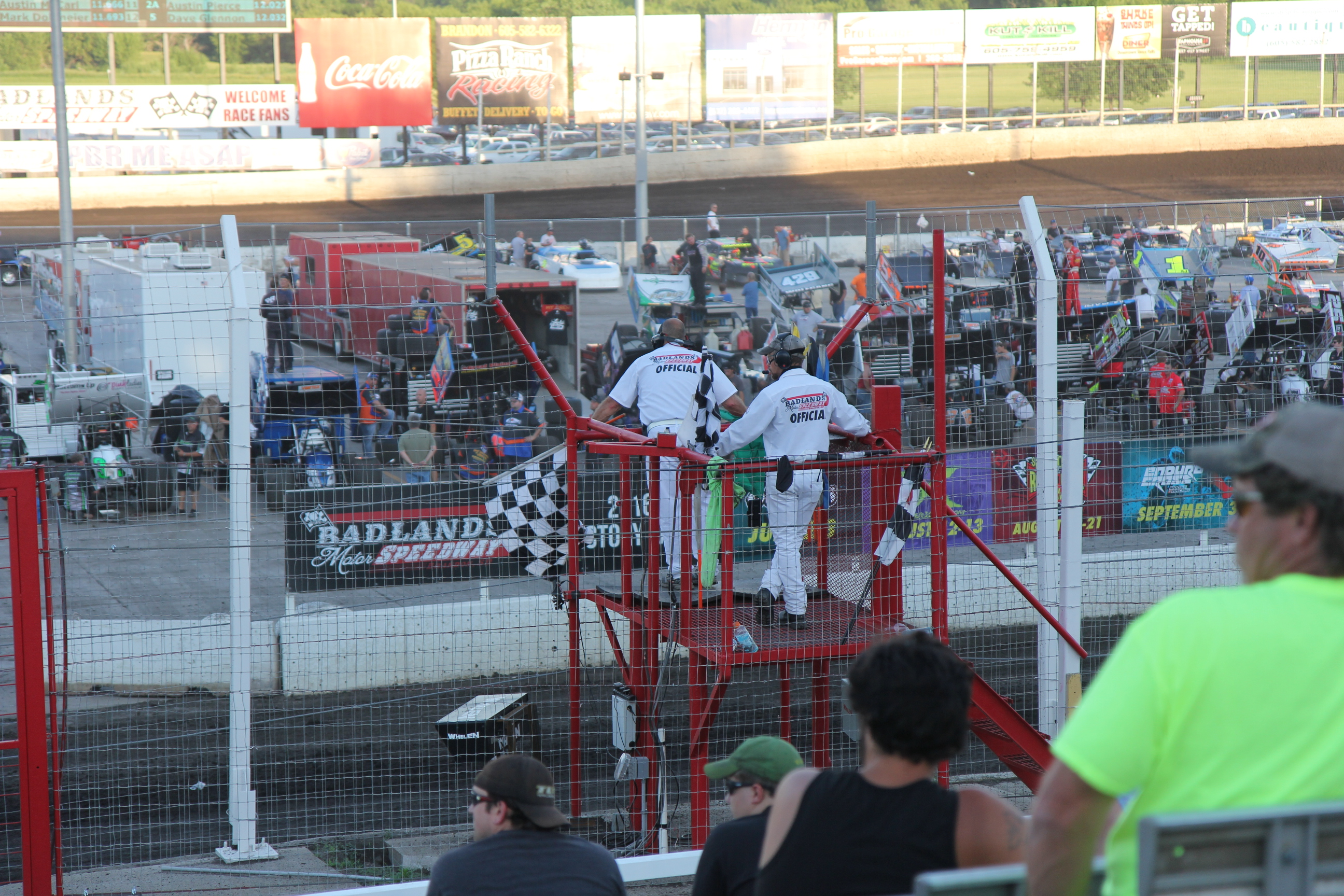
The flagstand, lower grandstands, and infield

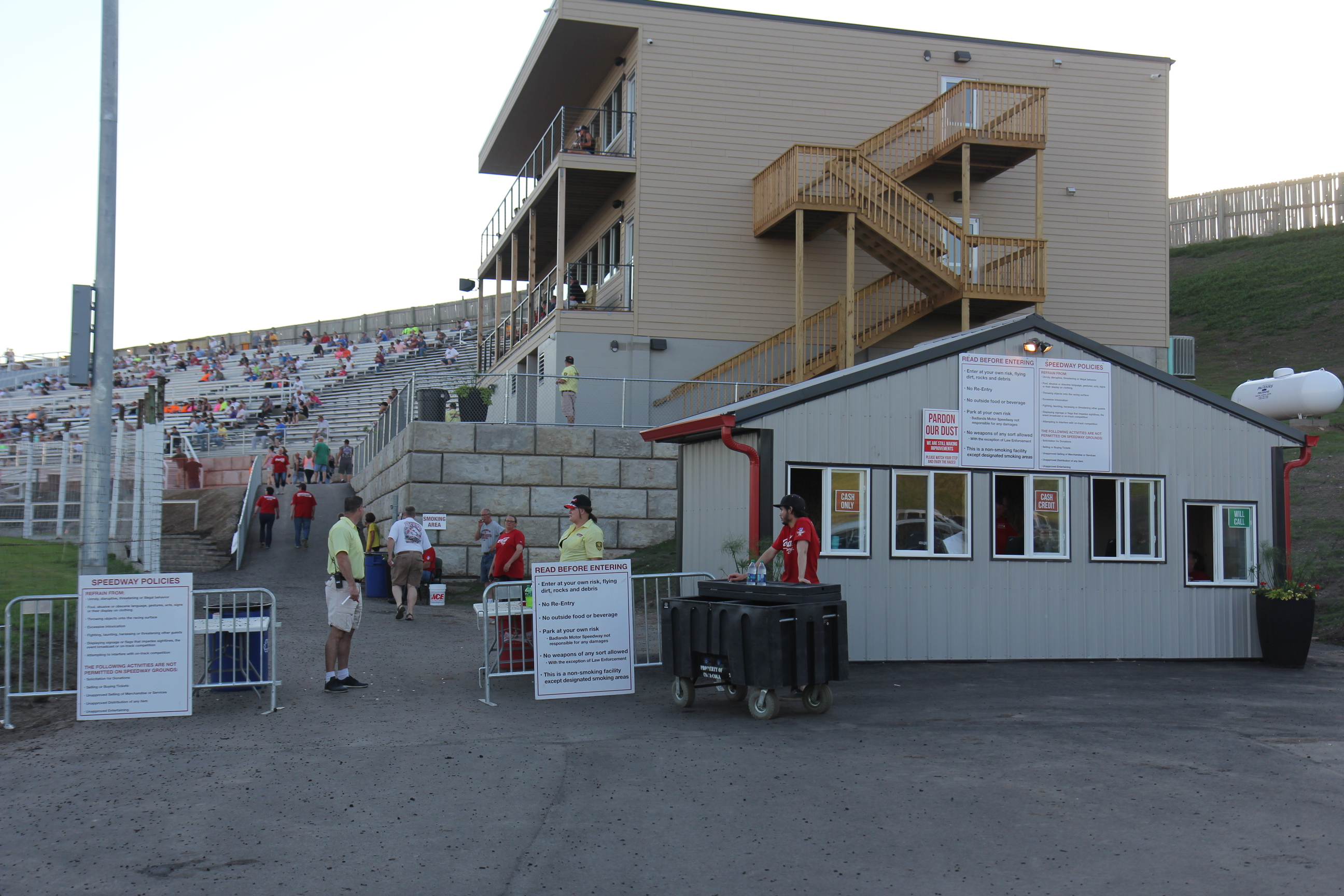
Ticket booth

Huset's Speedway (formerly known as Badlands Motor Speedway) is a 3/8-mile dirt oval racetrack located in Brandon, South Dakota, United States. Its name was changed to Badlands in 2015 when it was sold to Chuck Brennan, the owner of the Badlands Entertainment Group. The track opened in the 1950s. In the 2016 season, the track was also used as a concert venue as well as hosting monster truck, tractor pulling and Endurocross events. The track hosted a 2015 World of Outlaws Sprint car tour race. In 2016, the tracks hosted a $100,000-to-win 410 Sprint car show and a $250,000 Gold Cup sprint car race. The track closed in 2017 and reopened in 2020.

== History ==
=== Huset's Speedway (1953–2014) ===
The track was carved from a soybean field by farmer / businessman Til Huset in 1953. The track opened in 1954 and ran in 1955 before he shut it down for 1956 and 1957. The track reopened in July 1958 after Huset sold the track to the Sioux Falls Stock Car Association. The association was formed by drivers who were boycotting the nearby Soo Speedway track. The track began running sprint cars weekly in 1980. The World of Outlaws national tour ran their sprint cars at the track in April 1983 and it was won by Sammy Swindell. The association ran the races until it sold the track in 1988 to Clarence Rubin and his sons Greg and Steve. When NASCAR driver Tony Stewart came to race a sprint car in 2013, the track was sold beyond grandstand capacity and fans had to sit on a hill or pay for infield passes with an estimated attendance well over 10,000. Stewart needed a police escort to get into the facility. The Rubin family ran the track until 2015.

=== Badlands Motor Speedway (2015–2017) ===
In 2016, Badlands Speedway underwent a $6 million renovation including new suites, concession stands, restrooms, updated seating area, HD video boards and lighting system. Tom Savage was hired as one of the track's assistant General Manager in 2015. He was later promoted to General Manager in 2016. Bryan Clauson won his final sprint car race at a July 31 All Star Circuit of Champions race at Badlands before he died one week later.

Badlands hired the owner and manager of the I-90 Speedway near Hartford, South Dakota, which had closed. Lyle Howey, its owner for the last 10 years along with his wife Dawn, has become assistant general manager of facilities at Badlands instead. Howey will handle track preparation and Dawn will also be an employee. He was rookie of the year at Huset's Speedway in 1995.

According to long-term owner Steve Rubin, "All of the senators have been here, the governors, many dignitaries" have attended races or other events. The raceway hosted big concerts in the 1970s and 1980s. Per Rubin, "When we had the Beach Boys here in 1982, we had over 14,000 people then. Willie [Nelson] drew 12,000 and there were over 10,000 for Ricky Nelson".

The youngest winner in the track's 60+ year history is Jayden Larson, who won a B-Modified feature race in September 2015, as a 12-year-old. He had obtained clearance from the United States Racing Association to race without having a driver's license.

=== Closure (2017–2020) ===
Badlands Motor Speedway was shut down as of May 18, 2017 and on June 11, 2018, Minnehaha County Planning and Zoning informed Brennan that the conditional-use permit that allowed the racetrack to operate over the years had expired, which would have hindered the ability to sell the track to a new owner.

The zoning issue was resolved, but by late 2018, the owner of Badlands Speedway announced plans to demolish the racetrack if a sale agreement was not reached by the end of the year. Those plans were put on hold to give the previous owner, Steve Rubin, time to try and secure the needed financing to reacquire the racetrack. In the meantime, Lyle and Dawn Howey reopened I-90 Speedway in 2019 under new management. In 2020, Brennan announced that he wanted to host a two day show "if permitted by various government entities. We do not care if it is in June, July, August, or September, whenever we get the all clear from local, state, and federal authorities."

=== Huset's Speedway (2020–) ===
The track was sold in mid-July 2020 to Tod Quiring, the owner of the Jackson (MN) Motorplex; he announced an August reopening date as well as restoring historic Huset's name to the track. The first race at the track was a $20,000-to-win All Star Circuit of Champions race on August 2, 2020. The All Stars circuit returned for the first time since 2014 and the fifteenth time overall.

== Events ==
=== Silver Dollar Nationals ===
Nebrask's I-80 Speedway hosted the Silver Dollar Nations for 12 years (2011-2022) before being moving to Huset’s Speedway in Brandon, S.D., from 2023-2025. Shelby County Speedway now hosts the Silver Dollar Nationals.

| Year | Winner |
| 2023 | Brandon Sheppard |
| 2024 | Devin Moran |
| 2025 | Hudson O'Neal |

== National Tours Racing at the Track ==
- All Star Circuit of Champions
- USAC National Midget Cars
- USAC National Sprint Cars
- Lucas Oil Late Model Dirt Series
- World of Outlaws Sprint Cars
- AMSOIL Championship Snocross
