= Two Row Times =

Newspaper in Canada

The Two Row Times
- Type: Weekly newspaper
- Format: Compact (newspaper)
- Founder: Jonathan Garlow (publisher)
- Publisher: Garlow Media
- Founded: 2013; 13 years ago
- Political alignment: Great Law of Peace
- Headquarters: Six Nations of the Grand River; Oneida Business Park 124; 50 Generations Dr. Box 1, Ontario, Grand River Country
- Circulation: 23,000 Weekly
- Website: tworowtimes.com

The Two Row Times, an Onkwehon:we (Onkwehonwe) flagship publication of Garlow Media, is a free weekly news publication based in Hagersville, Ontario, Canada, and focusing distribution on the Six Nations of the Grand River Territory.

Circulation of the Two Row Times is about 23,000 copies, which are distributed to all Ontario Indian Reservations.

== Goals ==
The Two Row Times name originates from the Two Row Wampum Treaty and is based on the principle of unity through diversity. The publication strives to bring Native perspective news to the forefront of the global arena

== Content ==
=== Sections ===
The newspaper is organized in three sections.

1. News: Includes International, National, Business, Technology, Science, Health, Sports, Education, Weather, and Obituaries.
2. Opinion: Includes Editorials, Op-Eds and Letters to the Editor.
3. Features: Includes Arts, Movies, Theater, Travel, Food Guide, Home & Garden, Fashion & Style, Crossword puzzle.

== Online activity ==
Online content is available through open access which began on August 14, 2013. The Two Row Times is a hybrid business model of print and web-based publishing that uses social networks such as Facebook, Twitter and YouTube, building social media reach. Aimed to become a world voice for promoting strength, peace and righteousness, engagement of the youth and elders. Building innovative forms of multiplatform news production and distribution system to advance the interests of Onkwehonwe people throughout Turtle Island (North America).
