= 2019 World of Outlaws Craftsman Sprint Car Series =

41st season of World of Outlaws sprint car racing

The 2019 World of Outlaws NOS Energy Drink Sprint Car Series was the 41st season of the winged sprint car series sanctioned by World Racing Group, competing throughout the United States. The season began with the DIRTcar Nationals at Volusia Speedway Park on February 5 and ended with the World of Outlaws World Finals at The Dirt Track at Charlotte on November 9. 2019 saw Brad Sweet of Kasey Kahne Racing win his first of three consecutive titles.

== Teams and drivers ==
=== Full-time Teams ===
Team	No.	Driver
Shark Racing	1A	Jacob Allen
Shark Racing	1S	Logan Schuchart
Kyle Larson Racing	2	Carson Macedo
CJB Motorsports	5	Shane Stewart
Sides Motorsports	7	Jason Sides
Kinser Racing	11K	Kraig Kinser
Tony Stewart/Curb-Agajanian Racing	15	Donny Schatz
Stenhouse-Marshall Racing	17	Sheldon Haudenschild
KCP Racing	18	Ian Madsen
Brent Marks Racing	19	Brent Marks
Jason Johnson Racing	41	David Gravel
Kasey Kahne Racing	49	Brad Sweet
Roth Motorsports	83	Daryn Pittman

=== Part-time Teams ===
Team	No.	Driver
Williams Motorsports	0	Bud Kaeding
Kyle Larson Racing	1K	Kyle Larson
Sides Motorsports	7S	Tim Kaeding
Kasey Kahne Racing	9	Kasey Kahne
Brian Brown Racing	21	Brian Brown
Robbie Price Racing	21P	Robbie Price
Rico Abreu Racing	24	Rico Abreu
Rudeen Racing	26	Cory Eliason
Willie Croft Racing	29	Willie Croft
Mason Daniel Racing	33M	Mason Daniel
Swindell Speedlab	39	Christopher Bell
Danny Dietrich Racing	48	Danny Dietrich
Demyan-Rudzik Racing	49X	Tim Shaffer
Silva Motorsports	57	Kyle Larson
Premier Motorsports	70	Brock Zearfoss
Premier Motorsports	70X	Spencer Bayston
Roth Motorsports	83JR	Giovanni Scelzi
Tom Harris Motorsports	84	Tom Harris
Forsberg Racing	92	Andy Forsberg

== Schedule and results ==
The 2019 schedule was released on December 4, 2018.

No.	Date	Event	Track/Location	Winning driver	Hard Charger award	Last Chance winner	Dash winner	Fastest qualifier	Total car count	Winner's purse
1	February 8	DIRTcar Nationals	Volusia Speedway Park, Barberville, Florida	Daryn Pittman	David Gravel	Cale Conley	Shane Stewart	Ian Madsen	33	$10,000
2	February 9	DIRTcar Nationals	Volusia Speedway Park, Barberville, Florida	Daryn Pittman	Logan Schuchart	Logan Schuchart	Christopher Bell	Parker Price-Miller	31	$10,000
3	February 27	FVP Platinum Battery Showdown	The Dirt Track at Las Vegas Motor Speedway, Las Vegas, Nevada	Tim Shaffer	Cory Eliason	Kasey Kahne	Tim Shaffer	Jacob Allen	38	$10,000
4	February 28	FVP Platinum Battery Showdown	The Dirt Track at Las Vegas Motor Speedway, Las Vegas, Nevada	Donny Schatz	Cory Eliason	Tim Shaffer	Donny Schatz	Daryn Pittman	38	$10,000
5	March 9		Thunderbowl Speedway, Tulare, California	Ian Madsen	Chad Kemenah	Kraig Kinser	Ian Madsen	Ian Madsen	33	$10,000
6	March 15	Mini Gold Cup	Silver Dollar Speedway, Chico, California	Carson Macedo	Aaron Reutzel	David Gravel	Brad Sweet	Carson Macedo	39	$10,000
7	March 16	FVP Platinum Battery Shootout	Stockton Dirt Track, Stockton, California	Logan Schuchart	Carson Macedo	Terry McCarl	Logan Schuchart	Jacob Allen	35	$10,000
8	March 29		Keller Auto Speedway, Hanford, California	David Gravel	Brad Sweet	Tim Kaeding	Sheldon Haudenschild	Brad Sweet	32	$10,000
9	March 30		Perris Auto Speedway, Perris, California	Aaron Reutzel	Parker Price-Miller	Brent Marks	Aaron Reutzel	Aaron Reutzel	26	$10,000

=== Schedule changes ===
- The third night of racing scheduled for the World of Outlaws as part of the DIRTcar Nationals at Volusia Speedway Park on February 10 was rained out. Daryn Pittman was crowned the Nationals champion after winning the first two WoO features.
- The first Texas swing for the WoO saw scheduled races at the Lonestar Speedway and the Cotton Bowl Speedway on February 22 and 23 rained out.
- The first scheduled feature at Thunderbowl Speedway in Tulare on March 8 was canceled due to persistent rainfall.
- Rain forced the cancelation of the WoO feature at Ocean Speedway in Watsonville, California scheduled for Friday, March 22. In addition, the WoO feature scheduled for March 23 at the Placerville Speedway was rescheduled to September 11.

== Season summary ==
=== Race reports ===
Round 1: 2019 DIRTcar Nationals - Night 1

Daryn Pittman got the best of polesitter Shane Stewart on lap 26 and held the lead through turn 2, driving off to the season-opening win in a caution-free 30-lap feature. Stewart had previously held off two charges for the race lead; on lap 13, when Christopher Bell got alongside him on the backstretch as he was lapping Brent Marks, and again on lap 19 when Pittman got within a nose of Stewart at the start/finish line. Joining Pittman on the podium were Stewart and Bell, the first time that Oklahomans swept a WoO podium.

Heat races were won by Carson Macedo, Brad Sweet, Spencer Bayston and Bell.

Ian Madsen took fast time in a qualifying session that was stopped twice for incidents on track; David Gravel came to a stop coming to the green flag after dropping oil on the track, while Tom Harris spun in turn 4 trying to exit the track after taking his laps.

Round 2: 2019 DIRTcar Nationals - Night 2

Daryn Pittman prevailed in a battle of slide-jobs with Christopher Bell to score his second consecutive win at Volusia, again in a 30-lap caution-free feature. Pittman and Bell traded the lead six times, including four times in the final 10 laps. Joining them on the podium was defending WoO champion Donny Schatz. Rain added a few parade laps to a program that was already being expedited due to weather in the area.

Heat races were won by Carson Macedo, Pittman and Brian Brown. Ian Madsen blew an engine during the third heat race. Parker Price-Miller set fast time in qualifying.

Round 3: FVP Platinum Battery Showdown - Night 1

There was plenty of racing through the top five, but up front Tim Shaffer led all 30 laps of the opening night feature in Las Vegas. Shaffer's win came in a caution-filled race that featured six yellows and two red flags, one on lap 6 for Kraig Kinser flipping in turn 4, and again on lap 27 when the field was parked to allow for refueling. Tim Kaeding and Donny Schatz finished out the podium.

Heat races were won by Daryn Pittman, Giovanni Scelzi, Aaron Reutzel and Shaffer. Jacob Allen set fast time in qualifying.

Round 4: FVP Platinum Battery Showdown - Night 2

Donny Schatz pounced on the high side of turns 3 and 4 on the last lap of the 30-lap feature, pinning Daryn Pittman in lapped traffic to steal his first win of 2019 and 13th of his career at Las Vegas. Schatz led the opening 13 laps of the feature before Pittman got underneath him in turn 2 and led the rest of the way until the final corners. The feature was again marred by two red flags, one for refueling on lap 25 and on the opening lap when Parker Price-Miller flipped coming down the frontstretch. Pittman and Logan Schuchart rounded out the podium.

Heat races were won by Pittman, Ian Madsen, Jason Sides and Kyle Larson. Pittman set fast time in qualifying.

Round 5: Tulare, California

Ian Madsen led all 35 laps of the feature at Tulare, wiring a race that went off without an incident after a lap 1 crash saw DJ Netto flip soon after the green flag flew. Current points leader Daryn Pittman and Sheldon Haudenschild rounded out the podium. Logan Schuchart finished 19th while battling the flu.

Heat races were won by Madsen, Haudenschild, Tim Shaffer and Carson Macedo. There was a 1hr 31min rain delay between heats 2 and 3. Madsen set fast time in qualifying. Brian Brown spun during his qualifying attempt.

Round 6: Mini Gold Cup

Pouncing on a restart with 15 laps to go, Carson Macedo threw an aggressive slider on polesitter Brad Sweet and drove away to win an ugly Mini Gold Cup feature. The 35-lap feature was marred by six yellow and two red flags, the worst of which occurred on lap 9 when Sheldon Haudenschild endured a violent series of flips after making contact with Macedo at the end of the frontstretch and turning into the wall. Haudenschild was unharmed. Sweet and Ian Madsen completed the podium.

Due to the size of the field, a C-main was contested in advance of the last chance showdown, which was won by Shane Stewart. Justyn Cox and Terry McCarl traded swipes at each other under caution during the C-main after Cox spun McCarl on the race's first lap.

Heat races were won by Macedo, Tim Shaffer, Rico Abreu and Tim Kaeding. Bud Kaeding tipped over in turn 1 during the first heat race. Kasey Kahne spun twice during the second heat, first while leading the race. Aaron Reutzel spun during the third heat. Macedo set fast time in qualifying. Jason Sides spun during his first qualifying lap and McCarl got off-track on his second lap.

Round 7: FVP Platinum Battery Shootout

Logan Schuchart retook the lead from Shane Stewart on lap 24 of the 30-lap feature to score the win at Stockton, capitalizing as Stewart got out of shape through a rut in turn 4. Stewart had taken the lead from polesitter Schuchart on lap 12 of the feature after Schuchart got out of shape himself in a big rut in turn 2. Track conditions led officials to mandate single-file restarts for the majority of the feature. Brad Sweet and Tim Kaeding rounded out the podium.

Heat races were won by Cory Eliason, Schuchart, Sweet and Willie Croft. Jacob Allen posted fast time in qualifying.

Round 8: Hanford, California

David Gravel bested Shane Stewart on the low side of turn 3 with 14 to go to win the 35-lap Keller feature. Gravel's win was the 40th of his career, and more significantly the first for Jason Johnson Racing since the death of the team's namesake driver.

Heat races were won by Carson Macedo, Brent Marks, Gravel and Daryn Pittman. Brad Sweet posted fast time in qualifying. Jacob Allen spun during his qualifying session.

Round 9: Perris, California

Aaron Reutzel dominated the 30-lap feature at Perris, leading flag-to-flag from the pole without ever being challenged for the race lead. Carson Macedo and Rico Abreu finished out the podium. The only serious incident of the race came on lap 9, when Brent Marks flipped in turn 4.

Heat races were won by Reutzel, Abreu and Donny Schatz. Reutzel posted fast time in qualifying.
