= 2017 World of Outlaws Craftsman Sprint Car Series =

The 2017 World of Outlaws Craftsman Sprint Car Series season is the 39th season of the winged sprint car series in North America. The season began with the DIRTcar Nationals at Volusia Speedway Park on February 17, and will end with the World of Outlaws World Finals at The Dirt Track at Charlotte Motor Speedway on November 4. Donny Schatz entered the 2017 season as the defending series champion. Schatz won the series championship for the 9th time in 2017.

== Teams & Drivers ==
=== Complete Schedule ===
No.	Race driver	Team	Chassis Manufacturer
1a	Jacob Allen	Shark Racing	Triple X
1s	Logan Schuchart	Shark Racing	Triple X
2	Shane Stewart	Larson Marks Racing	Cool Chassis
4	Paul McMahan Parker Price-Miller	Destiny Motorsports	Maxim
5	David Gravel	CJB Motorsports	GF1
7s	Jason Sides	Sides Motorsports	Maxim
9	Daryn Pittman	Kasey Kahne Racing with Mike Curb	GF1
11k	Kraig Kinser	Steve Kinser Racing	DRC
13	Clyde Knipp	Clyde Knipp Racing	Triple X
15	Donny Schatz	Tony Stewart/Curb-Agajanian Racing	J&J
17	Joey Saldana Jac Haudenschild	Stenhouse Jr./Wood Racing	KPC
19	Brent Marks	Brent Marks Racing	Maxim
W20	Greg Wilson	Greg Wilson Racing	Maxim
41	Jason Johnson	JJR-Marshall Racing	Maxim
49	Brad Sweet	Kasey Kahne Racing	GF1
93	Sheldon Haudenschild	Haudenschild Racing	Triple X

== Schedule ==
No.	Date	Race title	Track	TV/Stream
1	February 17	DIRTcar Nationals	Volusia Speedway Park, Barberville, Florida	DIRTvision.com
≠	February 18	DIRTcar Nationals	Volusia Speedway Park, Barberville, Florida	DIRTvision.com
2	February 19	DIRTcar Nationals	Volusia Speedway Park, Barberville, Florida	DIRTvision.com
3	February 19	DIRTcar Nationals	Volusia Speedway Park, Barberville, Florida	DIRTvision.com
4	March 3	East Texas Lone Star Shootout	Lonestar Speedway, Kilgore, Texas	
≠	March 4	Gator Bash	Gator Motorplex, Willis, Texas	
5	March 9	FVP Outlaw Shootout	The Dirt Track at Las Vegas Motor Speedway, Las Vegas, Nevada	DIRTvision.com
6	March 10	FVP Outlaw Shootout	The Dirt Track at Las Vegas Motor Speedway, Las Vegas, Nevada	DIRTvision.com
7	March 17	Outlaws at Tulare	Thunderbowl Raceway, Tulare, California	DIRTvision.com
8	March 18	Outlaws at Tulare	Thunderbowl Raceway, Tulare, California	DIRTvision.com
≠	March 24	FVP Western Spring Shootout	Stockton Dirt Track, Stockton, California	
9	March 25	FVP Western Spring Shootout	Stockton Dirt Track, Stockton, California	
10	March 29	Brad Sweet Placerville Short Track Showdown presented by NAPA Auto Parts	Placerville Speedway, Placerville, California	
11	March 31	Kings Outlaw Showdown	Keller Auto Speedway, Hanford, California	
12	April 1	SoCal Showdown	Perris Auto Speedway, Perris, California	
13	April 7	Yuma Valley Showdown	Cocopah Speedway, Somerton, Arizona	
14	April 8	Arizona Desert Shootout	Arizona Speedway, Queen Creek, Arizona	
15	April 13	Gator Bash	Gator Motorplex, Willis, Texas	
16	April 14	Texas Outlaw Nationals	Devil's Bowl Speedway, Mesquite, Texas	DIRTvision.com
17	April 15	Lanny Edwards Memorial	Devil's Bowl Speedway, Mesquite, Texas	DIRTvision.com
≠	April 21	Bullring Outlaw Blitz	Riverside International Speedway, West Memphis, Arkansas	
≠	April 22	Spring Classic	Federated Auto Parts Raceway at I-55, Pevely, Missouri	
18	April 28	Bob Newton Classic	Plymouth Speedway, Plymouth, Indiana	DIRTvision.com
≠	April 29		Tri-State Speedway, Haubstadt, Indiana	
≠	May 3	Bullring Outlaw Blitz	Riverside International Speedway, West Memphis, Arkansas	
19	May 5	Sedalia "Show-Me" Showdown	Missouri State Fair Speedway, Sedalia, Missouri	
20	May 6	Kansas Outlaw Klassic	81 Speedway, Park City, Kansas	
21	May 12	#LetsRaceTwo	Eldora Speedway, Rossburg, Ohio	
22	May 13	#LetsRaceTwo	Eldora Speedway, Rossburg, Ohio	
23	May 14		Tri-State Speedway, Haubstadt, Indiana	
24	May 17	Gettysburg Clash	Lincoln Speedway, Abbottstown, Pennsylvania	DIRTvision.com
25	May 19	Spring Classic	Williams Grove Speedway, Mechanicsburg, Pennsylvania	DIRTvision.com
26	May 20	Morgan Cup	Williams Grove Speedway, Mechanicsburg, Pennsylvania	DIRTvision.com
≠	May 21	Empire State Challenge	Weedsport Speedway, Weedsport, New York	DIRTvision.com
27	May 23	Jersey Outlaw Classic	New Egypt Speedway, New Egypt, New Jersey	
28	May 26	Outlaw Showdown	The Dirt Track at Charlotte Motor Speedway, Concord, North Carolina	DIRTvision.com
29	May 29	Outlaw Spring Nationals	Lawrenceburg Speedway, Lawrenceburg, Indiana	
30	June 1	AGCO Jackson Nationals	Jackson Motorplex, Jackson, Minnesota	DIRTvision.com
31	June 2	AGCO Jackson Nationals	Jackson Motorplex, Jackson, Minnesota	DIRTvision.com
32	June 3	AGCO Jackson Nationals	Jackson Motorplex, Jackson, Minnesota	DIRTvision.com
33	June 9	Brownells Big Guns Bash	Knoxville Raceway, Knoxville, Iowa	DIRTvision.com
34	June 10	Brownells Big Guns Bash	Knoxville Raceway, Knoxville, Iowa	DIRTvision.com
35	June 13	Eagle Nationals	Eagle Raceway, Eagle, Nebraska	
36	June 16	First Leg of the Gerdau Northern Tour	River Cities Speedway, Grand Forks, North Dakota	
≠	June 17	Duel in the Dakotas	Red River Valley Speedway, West Fargo, North Dakota	
37	June 20	Marthaler Chevrolet of Glenwood presents the World of Outlaws	Granite City Speedway, Sauk Rapids, Minnesota	
38	June 23	West Liberty Hawkeye 25	West Liberty Raceway, West Liberty, Iowa	
39	June 24	Jim "JB" Boyd Memorial presented by Karavan Trailers	Beaver Dam Raceway, Beaver Dam, Wisconsin	
40	June 27	Outlaw Clay Classic	The Dirt Oval at Route 66, Joliet, Illinois	DIRTvision.com
≠	June 29	Clash at the Creek	Deer Creek Speedway, Spring Valley, Minnesota	
41	July 1		Dakota State Fair Speedway, Huron, South Dakota	
42	July 6	Clash at the Creek	Deer Creek Speedway, Spring Valley, Minnesota	
43	July 7	FVP Outlaws at Cedar Lake	Cedar Lake Speedway, New Richmond, Wisconsin	DIRTvision.com
44	July 8	FVP Outlaws at Cedar Lake	Cedar Lake Speedway, New Richmond, Wisconsin	DIRTvision.com
45	July 11	Ohio Logistics Brad Doty Classic	Attica Raceway Park, Attica, Ohio	
46	July 13	Jokers Wild	Eldora Speedway, Rossburg, Ohio	DIRTvision.com
47	July 14	Knight Before the Kings Royal	Eldora Speedway, Rossburg, Ohio	CBS Sports Network DIRTvision.com
48	July 15	Kings Royal	Eldora Speedway, Rossburg, Ohio	CBS Sports Network DIRTvision.com
49	July 18	Don Martin Memorial Silver Cup	Lernerville Speedway, Sarver, Pennsylvania	DIRTvision.com
50	July 21	Champion Racing Oil Summer Nationals	Williams Grove Speedway, Mechanicsburg, Pennsylvania	DIRTvision.com
≠	July 22	Champion Racing Oil Summer Nationals	Williams Grove Speedway, Mechanicsburg, Pennsylvania	DIRTvision.com
≠	July 23	The Big "R" Outlaw Shootout	Ransomville Speedway, Ransomville, New York	
51	July 25	Arrow Express Six Nations Showdown	Ohsweken Speedway, Ohsweken, Ontario, Canada	
52	July 28	Battle of Michigan	Hartford Speedway, Hartford, Michigan	
53	July 29	Badger 40	Wilmot Speedway, Wilmot, Wisconsin	
54	August 4	Night Before the Ironman	Federated Auto Parts Raceway at I-55, Pevely, Missouri	DIRTvision.com
≠	August 5	Ironman 55	Federated Auto Parts Raceway at I-55, Pevely, Missouri	DIRTvision.com
≈	August 9	5-HOUR ENERGY Knoxville Nationals	Knoxville Raceway, Knoxville, Iowa	The Cushion
≈	August 10	5-HOUR ENERGY Knoxville Nationals	Knoxville Raceway, Knoxville, Iowa	The Cushion
≈	August 11	5-HOUR ENERGY Knoxville Nationals	Knoxville Raceway, Knoxville, Iowa	The Cushion
55	August 12	5-HOUR ENERGY Knoxville Nationals	Knoxville Raceway, Knoxville, Iowa	MavTV The Cushion
56	August 18	Second Leg of the Gerdau Northern Tour	River Cities Speedway, Grand Forks, North Dakota	
57	August 19	Duel in the Dakotas	Red River Valley Speedway, West Fargo, North Dakota	
58	August 20	Gerdau Magic City Showdown presented by Fastlane Carwash	Nodak Speedway, Minot, North Dakota	
59	August 25	Rushmore Outlaw Showdown	Black Hills Speedway, Rapid City, South Dakota	
60	August 26	Big Sky Brawl at Billings	BMP Speedway, Billings, Montana	
61	September 1	Outlaw Energy Shootout	Skagit Speedway, Alger, Washington	
62	September 2	Outlaw Energy Shootout	Skagit Speedway, Alger, Washington	
63	September 4		Grays Harbor Speedway, Elma, Washington	
64	September 6		Willamette Speedway, Lebanon, Oregon	
65	September 8	Gold Cup Race of Champions	Silver Dollar Speedway, Chico, California	DIRTvision.com
66	September 9	Gold Cup Race of Champions		DIRTvision.com
67	September 15	Wine County Classic	Calistoga Speedway, Calistoga, California	DIRTvision.com
68	September 16	Wine County Classic	Calistoga Speedway, Calistoga, California	DIRTvision.com
69	September 22	BeFour the Crowns Showdown	Eldora Speedway, Rossburg, Ohio	
70	September 23	Commonwealth Clash	Lernerville Speedway, Sarver, Pennsylvania	DIRTvision.com
71	September 28	Champion Racing Oil Summer Nationals (Makeup Feature)	Williams Grove Speedway, Mechanicsburg, Pennsylvania	DIRTvision.com
72	September 28	Champion Racing Oil National Open	Williams Grove Speedway, Mechanicsburg, Pennsylvania	DIRTvision.com
73	September 29	Champion Racing Oil National Open	Williams Grove Speedway, Mechanicsburg, Pennsylvania	DIRTvision.com
74	September 30	Champion Racing Oil National Open	Williams Grove Speedway, Mechanicsburg, Pennsylvania	DIRTvision.com
75	October 7		Fulton Speedway, Fulton, New York	
76	October 14	Nittany Showdown	Port Royal Speedway, Port Royal, Pennsylvania	
≠	October 15	Empire State Challenge	Weedsport Speedway, Weedsport, New York	
77	October 16	The Big "R" Outlaw Shootout presented by Budweiser	Ransomville Speedway, Ransomville, New York	
78	October 20	FVP Outlaw Showdown	Lakeside Speedway, Kansas City, Kansas	
79	October 21	Twister Showdown	Salina Highbanks Speedway, Salina, Oklahoma	DIRTvision.com
≠	October 27	Outlaw Boot Hill Showdown	Dodge City Raceway Park, Dodge City, Kansas	
≠	October 28	Outlaw Boot Hill Showdown	Dodge City Raceway Park, Dodge City, Kansas	
≈	November 2	World of Outlaws World Finals	The Dirt Track at Charlotte Motor Speedway, Concord, North Carolina	CBS Sports Network DIRTvision.com
80	November 3	World of Outlaws World Finals	The Dirt Track at Charlotte Motor Speedway, Concord, North Carolina	CBS Sports Network DIRTvision.com
81	November 4	World of Outlaws World Finals	The Dirt Track at Charlotte Motor Speedway, Concord, North Carolina	CBS Sports Network DIRTvision.com

- - ≠ will state if the race was postponed or canceled
- - ≈ will state if the race is not for championship points

=== Schedule notes and changes ===
- - the February 18th race at Volusia Speedway Park was postponed to February 19 due to weather
- - the March 4th race at Gator Motorplex was postponed to April 14 due to weather
- - the March 24th race at Stockton Dirt Track was canceled due to weather
- - the April 21st race at Riverside International Speedway was postponed to May 3 due to weather
- - the April 22nd race at Federated Auto Parts Raceway at I-55 was canceled due to weather
- - the Outlaw Fanfest (July 1 & July 2) at Badlands Motor Speedway was canceled. Dakota State Fair Speedway ran on the July 1st date in its place.
- - the Duel in the Dakotas (June 17) race at Red River Valley Speedway was postponed until August 19.
- - the Clash at the Creek (June 29) race at Deer Creek Speedway was postponed until July 6.
- - Empire State Challenge race at Weedsport Speedway was canceled after having rain outs on both slated race dates (May 21 and October 15)
- - the Champion Racing Oil Summer Nationals (July 22) race at Williams Grove Speedway was postponed until September 28, making night #1 of the Champion Racing Oil National Open a 2 feature event.
- - the Big "R" Outlaw Showdown (July 23) race at Ransomville Speedway was postponed until October 16.
- - the Ironman 55 race at Federated Auto Parts Raceway at I-55 was postponed to the 2018 season.

== Results and standings ==
=== Races ===
No.	Race / Track	Winning driver	Winning team	Hard Charger Award winner	Last Chance Showdown winner	Craftsman Club Dash winner	Fastest Qualifier
1	DIRTcar Nationals - Night #1	Jason Johnson	JJR-Marshall Racing	Chad Kemenah	Shane Stewart	Christopher Bell	Christopher Bell
2	DIRTcar Nationals - Night #3 (Afternoon)	Donny Schatz	Tony Stewart Racing	Kerry Madsen	Aaron Reutzel	Donny Schatz	David Gravel
3	DIRTcar Nationals - Night #3	Donny Schatz	Tony Stewart Racing	Donny Schatz	Brad Sweet	Brian Brown	Brian Brown
4	East Texas Lone Star Shootout	Donny Schatz	Tony Stewart Racing	Kraig Kinser	Sam Hafertepe Jr.	Donny Schatz	Donny Schatz
5	FVP Outlaw Showdown - Night #1	Donny Schatz	Tony Stewart Racing	Rico Abreu	Rico Abreu	Shane Stewart	Jason Johnson
6	FVP Outlaw Showdown - Night #2	Donny Schatz	Tony Stewart Racing	Carson Macedo	Brent Marks	Logan Schuchart	Kerry Madsen
7	Tulare - Night #1	David Gravel	CJB Motorsports	Sheldon Haudenschild	Jason Solwold	Shane Stewart	Rico Abreu
8	Tulare - Night #2	Donny Schatz	Tony Stewart Racing	Logan Schuchart	Ian Madsen	Shane Stewart	Shane Stewart
9	FVP Western Spring Shootout - Night #2	Brad Sweet	Kasey Kahne Racing	Tim Kaeding	Kyle Hirst	Jason Sides	Shane Stewart
10	Brad Sweet Placerville Short Track Showdown	David Gravel	CJB Motorsports	Joey Saldana	Logan Schuchart	Shane Stewart	David Gravel
11	Kings Outlaw Shootout	Logan Schuchart	Shark Racing	Logan Schuchart	Donny Schatz	James McFadden	Brad Sweet
12	SoCal Shootout	David Gravel	CJB Motorsports	Greg Wilson	Tayler Malsam	Brad Sweet	Brad Sweet
13	Yuma Valley Showdown	Brian Brown	Brian Brown Racing	Daryn Pittman	Brent marks	Jason Sides	Brad Sweet
14	Arizona Desert Shootout	Rico Abreu	Rico Abreu Racing	Kraig Kinser	Kraig Kinser	Rico Abreu	David Gravel
15	Gator Outlaw Bash	David Gravel	CJB Motorsports	Logan Schuchart	Shane Stewart	Jason Sides	Brad Sweet
16	Texas Outlaw Nationals - Night #1	Jason Johnson	JJR-Marshall Racing	Kraig Kinser	Jacob Allen	Jason Johnson	Jason Johnson
17	Lanny Edwards Memorial / Texas Outlaw Nationals - Night #2	Brad Sweet	Kasey Kahne Racing	Logan Schuchart	Logan Schuchart	David Gravel	Jason Sides
18	Plymouth	David Gravel	CJB Motorsports	Greg Wilson	Kraig Kinser	Jason Sides	Parker Price-Miller
19	Sedalia "Show-me" Showdown	Donny Schatz	Tony Stewart Racing	Danny Lasoski	Sheldon Haudenschild	Daryn Pittman	Jason Johnson
20	Kansas Outlaw Klassic	Donny Schatz	Tony Stewart Racing	Shane Stewart	Don Droud	Donny Schatz	Jason Johnson
21	#LetsRaceTwo - Night #1	Logan Schuchart	Shark Racing	Kraig Kinser	Kraig Kinser	Jason Johnson	Jason Sides
22	#LetsRaceTwo - Night #2	Donny Schatz	Tony Stewart Racing	Brent Marks	Paul McMahan	Donny Schatz	Tim Shaffer
23	Haubstadt	Parker Price-Miller		Shane Stewart	Greg Wilson	David Gravel	Brady Bacon
24	Gettysburg Clash	David Gravel	CJB Motorsports	Brian Montieth	Lucas Wolfe	David Gravel	David Gravel (A) Danny Dietrich (B)
25	Spring Classic	David Gravel	CJB Motorsports	Logan Schuchart	Trey Starks	David Gravel	Freddie Rahmer (A) Joey Saldana (B)
26	Morgan Cup	Shane Stewart	Larson Marks Racing	Daryn Pittman	Brent Marks	Shane Stewart	Jason Johnson
27	Jersey Outlaw Classic	David Gravel	CJB Motorsports	Logan Schuchart	Jason Sides	Jason Johnson	Donny Schatz
28	Outlaw Showdown	Logan Schuchart	Shark Racing	Greg Wilson		Brad Sweet	Brad Sweet
29	Memorial Day Spectacular	Shane Stewart	Larson Marks Racing	David Gravel	Tim Kaeding	Donny Schatz	Jason Johnson
30	AGCO Jackson Nationals - Night #1	Ian Madsen	KCP Racing	Daryn Pittman	Jacob Allen	Ian Madsen	David Gravel (A) Kerry Madsen (B)
31	AGCO Jackson Nationals - Night #2	Kerry Madsen	Big Game Motorsports	Shane Stewart	Jacob Allen	Kerry Madsen	Joey Saldana (A) Brad Sweet (B)
32	AGCO Jackson Nationals - Night #3	Brad Sweet	Kasey Kahne Racing	Sheldon Haudenschild	Sheldon Haudenschild	Kerry Madsen	
33	Brownells Big Guns Bash - Night #1	Brad Sweet	Kasey Kahne Racing	Ian Madsen	Sheldon Haudenschild	Brad Sweet	Kerry Madsen (A) Joey Saldana (B)
34	Brownells Big Guns Bash - Night #2	Donny Schatz	Tony Stewart Racing	Shane Stewart	Brooke Tatnell	Brad Sweet	David Gravel (A) Donny Schatz (B)
35	Eagle Nationals	Kyle Larson	Stenhouse Jr/Wood Racing	Terry McCarl	Jason Sides	Daryn Pittman	Kerry Madsen
36	Gerdau Recycling Northern Tour	David Gravel	CJB Motorsports	Brent Marks	Brent Marks	Jacob Allen	Jason Johnson (A) Joey Saldana (B)
37	Marthaler Chevrolet of Glenwood presents the World of Outlaws	Donny Schatz	Tony Stewart Racing	Brad Sweet		Jason Johnson	Jason Johnson
38	West Liberty Hawkeye 25	Shane Stewart	Larson Marks Racing	Brent Marks	Paul Nienhiser	Shane Stewart	Jac Haudenschild
39	Jim "JB" Boyd Memorial	Shane Stewart	Larson Marks Racing	Kerry Madsen	Kerry Madsen	Donny Schatz	Jason Sides (A) Daryn Pittman (B)
40	FVP Outlaw Clay Classic	Donny Schatz	Tony Stewart Racing	Brad Sweet	Logan Schuchart	Jason Sides	Daryn Pittman
41	Dakota State Fair Speedway	Donny Schatz	Tony Stewart Racing	Sheldon Haudenschild		Daryn Pittman	Kraig Kinser
42	Clash at the Creek	Kraig Kinser	Steve Kinser Racing	Jacob Allen	Paige Polyak	David Gravel	Daryn Pittman
43	FVP Platinum Battery Showdown - Night #1	Kerry Madsen	Big Game Motorsports	Greg Wilson	Jacob Allen	Jac Haudenschild	Kerry Madsen
44	FVP Platinum Battery Showdown - Night #2	Kerry Madsen	Big Game Motorsports	Bill Balog	Logan Schuchart	Jason Johnson	Donny Schatz
45	Brad Doty Classic	David Gravel	CJB Motorsports	Brad Sweet	Parker Price-Miller	Tim Shaffer (#1) Sheldon Haudenschild (#2)	Dale Blaney (A) Brent Marks (B)
46	Jokers Wild	Kerry Madsen	Big Game Motorsports	Brent Marks	Cole Duncan	Kerry Madsen	Tim Shaffer (A) David Gravel (B)
47	Knight before the Kings Royal	Christopher Bell	Tony Stewart Racing	Brent Marks	Joey Saldana	Brian Brown (1) Brad Sweet (2)	Jason Johnson (A) Donny Schatz (B)
48	Kings Royal	Donny Schatz	Tony Stewart Racing	Ryan Smith	David Gravel		Donny Schatz
49	Don Martin Memorial Silver Cup	Donny Schatz	Tony Stewart Racing	Jason Johnson	James McFadden	Daryn Pittman	Tim Shaffer (A) Chad Kemenah (B)
50	Champion Racing Oil Summer Nationals	Brock Zearfoss		Brian Montieth	James McFadden	Lance Dewease	Brock Zearfoss (A) David Gravel (B)
51	Arrow Express Six Nationals Showdown	Logan Schuchart	Shark Racing	Jacob Allen	Kraig Kinser	Donny Schatz	Brad Sweet (A) Shane Stewart (B)
52	Battle of Michigan	David Gravel	CJB Motorsports	Greg Wilson	Carson Macedo	Shane Stewart	David Gravel
53	Wilmot	David Gravel	CJB Motorsports	Blake Nimee	Jeremy Schultz	Paul McMahan	Paul McMahan
54	Night Before the Ironman	Daryn Pittman	Kasey Kahne Racing	Brandon Hanks	Jacob Allen	Daryn Pittman	Jason Johnson
*	5-Hour Energy Knoxville Nationals - Prelim Night #1	Kyle Larson	Paul Silva	Tim Shaffer	Lucas Wolfe		Kerry Madsen
*	5-Hour Energy Knoxville Nationals - Prelim Night #2	David Gravel	CJB Motorsports	Brandon Hanks	Rico Abreu		David Gravel
*	5-Hour Energy Knoxville Nationals - Prelim Night #3	Jason Johnson	JJR-Marshall Racing	Chad Kemenah	Lynton Jeffrey Chad Kemenah		Jacob Allen (A) Jason Johnson (B)
*	Speed Sport World Challenge	Jason Johnson	JJR-Marshall Racing	Brad Sweet			
55	5-Hour Energy Knoxville Nationals	Donny Schatz	Tony Stewart Racing	Aaron Reutzel	Jason Sides		David Gravel
56	American Tire Service presents the 2nd Leg of the Northern Tour	Donny Schatz	Tony Stewart Racing	Mark Dobmeier	Mark Dobmeier	Sheldon Haudenschild	Jason Sides (A) Sheldon Haudenschild (B)
57	Gerdau Recycling Duel in the Dakotas	Jason Johnson	JJR-Marshall Racing	Tim Kaeding	Paul McMahan	Kraig Kinser	Shane Stewart
58	Gerdau Magic City Showdown	David Gravel	CJB Motorsports	Jason Johnson	Greg Nikitenko	David Gravel	Brad Sweet
59	Rushmore Outlaw Showdown	Shane Stewart	Larson Marks Racing	Brent Marks		Brad Sweet	Shane Stewart
60	Big Sky Brawl at Billings	Daryn Pittman	Kasey Kahne Racing	Sheldon Haudenschild		Shane Stewart	Jason Johnson
61	Outlaw Energy Showdown - Night #1	Shane Stewart	Larson Marks Racing	Greg Wilson	Jacob Allen	Brad Sweet	Shane Stewart
62	Outlaw Energy Showdown - Night #2	Daryn Pittman	Kasey Kahne Racing	David Gravel	Eric Fisher	Jason Johnson	Jason Johnson
63	Grays Harbor	Shane Stewart	Larson Marks Racing	Dominic Scelzi	Brent Marks	Shane Stewart	Daryn Pittman
64	Willamette	Jason Johnson	JJR-Marshall Racing	David Gravel		Shane Stewart	Kraig Kinser
65	Gold Cup Race of Champions - Night #1	Kyle Hirst	Roth Motorsports	David Gravel	Brad Sweet	Kyle Hirst	Shane Stewart (A) Justin Sanders (B)
66	Gold Cup Race of Champions - Night #2	Shane Stewart	Larson Marks Racing	Donny Schatz	DJ Netto	Justin Sanders	Dominic Scelzi (A) Jac Haudenschild (B)
67	Wine Country Outlaw Showdown - Night #1	Brad Sweet	Kasey Kahne Racing	Donny Schatz	Austen Wheatley	Brad Sweet	Brad Sweet
68	Wine Country Outlaw Showdown - Night #2	Donny Schatz	Tony Stewart Racing	Austen Wheatley	Bud Kaeding	Shane Stewart	Brad Sweet
69	BeFour the Crowns	Tim Shaffer	Demyan-Rudzik Racing	Brent Marks	Cole Duncan	Tim Shaffer	Shane Stewart (A) Donny Schatz (B)
70	Commonwealth Clash	David Gravel	CJB Motorsports	Danny Holtgraver	Jason Sides	Brad Sweet	Shane Stewart
71	Champion Racing Oils National Open - (Summer Nationals Makeup)	Greg Hodnett	Heffner Racing	Freddie Rahmer	Anthony Macri	Greg Hodnett	Greg Hodnett (A) Logan Schuchart (B)
72	Champion Racing Oils National Open - Night #1	David Gravel	CJB Motorsports	Freddie Rahmer	Freddie Rahmer	Greg Hodnett	Greg Hodnett (A) Shane Stewart (B)
73	Champion Racing Oils National Open - Night #2	James McFadden		Lance Dewease	Lance Dewease	James McFadden	Jason Sides (A) Lucas Wolfe (B)
74	Champion Racing Oils National Open - Night #3	David Gravel	CJB Motorsports	Logan Schuchart	Brad Sweet	David Gravel	Donny Schatz
75	Fulton - a part of NAPA Auto Parts Super DIRT Week	David Gravel	CJB Motorsports	Mike Mahaney	Paul Colagiovanni	Daryn Pittman	Jason Johnson
76	Nittany Showdown	Donny Schatz	Tony Stewart Racing	Shane Stewart	Tony Stewart	Brock Zearfoss	Jason Johnson (A) Jacob Allen (B)
77	The Big "R" Outlaw Showdown	Tim Shaffer	Demyan-Rudzik Racing	Jac Haudenschild	Clyde Knipp	Brad Sweet	Donny Schatz
78	FVP Platinum Battery Shootout	Brian Brown	Brian Brown Racing	Logan Schuchart	Logan Schuchart	Brian Brown	Jason Johnson
79	Twister Showdown	Kerry Madsen	Big Game Motorsports	Kraig Kinser		David Gravel	Shane Stewart
80	Textron Off Road World of Outlaws World Finals - Night #2	Donny Schatz	Tony Stewart Racing	Brad Sweet	Brian Brown	Ian Madsen (#1) Bill Balog (#2)	David Gravel (A) Daryn Pittman (B)
81	Textron Off Road World of Outlaws World Finals - Night #3	David Gravel	CJB Motorsports	Logan Schuchart	Shane Stewart	Brian Brown (#1) Ryan Smith (#2)	Trey Starks (A) Ian Madsen (B)

=== Driver Points ===
Below shows the top 100 in final points standings for 2017. 356 drivers in total attempted a World of Outlaws Craftsman Sprint Cars Series race in 2017.

Pos	Car #	Driver	Points Total
1	15	Donny Schatz	11410
2	49	Brad Sweet	11200
3	5	David Gravel	11082
4	9	Daryn Pittman	10718
5	2	Shane Stewart	10702
6	41	Jason Johnson	10496
7	93	Sheldon Haudenschild	10118
8	11k	Kraig Kinser	9946
9	1S	Logan Schuchart	9854
10	19	Brent Marks	9744
11	7S	Jason Sides	9742
12	W20	Greg Wilson	9170
13	13M 4	Paul McMahan	8348
14	1A	Jacob Allen	8216
15	13	Clyde Knipp	7788
16	18	Ian Madsen	5780
17	71 17	Joey Saldana	5432
18	17 6	Jac Haudenschild	5104
19	4 2	Parker Price-Miller	4516
20	21	Brian Brown	4370
21	2M	Kerry Madsen	4298
22	41S	Dominic Scelzi	3450
23	24R	Rico Abreu	3356
24	49X	Tim Shaffer	3346
25	3	Tim Kaeding	3010
26	99	Brady Bacon	2968
27	13D	Danny Dietrich	2382
28	21X	Carson Macedo	2284
29	19P	Paige Polyak	2214
30	24	Terry McCarl	2200
31	1	Dale Blaney	2112
32	44	Trey Starks	2014
33	3H	James McFadden	1958
34	24	Lucas Wolfe	1914
35	49L	Danny Lasoski	1828
36	10H	Chad Kemenah	1758
37	27	Greg Hodnett	1724
38	71	Jamie Veal	1724
39	17B	Bill Balog	1558
40	26	Tayler Malsam	1536
41	13JT	Mark Dobmeier	1528
42	49D	Shawn Dancer	1298
43	87	Aaron Reutzel	1298
44	14	Christopher Bell	1278
45	17X	Josh Baughman	1242
46	0	Bud Kaeding	1210
47	12N	Cole Duncan	1206
48	58	Brock Zearfoss	1204
49	82	Cap Henry	1172
50	3C	DJ Netto	1152
51	83	Kyle Hirst	1152
52	55	Brooke Tatnell	1106
53	7W	Tasker Phillips	1094
54	9X	Paul Nienhiser	1058
55	69K	Lance Dewease	1040
56	29	Willie Croft	1036
57	5H	Cory Eliason	1004
58	51	Freddie Rahmer	966
59	21	Brian Montieth	950
60	39	Cory Haas	938
61	11	T.J. Stutts	904
62	12W	Troy Fraker	900
63	14	Tony Stewart	896
64	18S	Jason Solwod	886
65	39M	Anthony Macri	884
66	44W	Austen Wheatley	870
67	17M	Max McGhee	858
68	9Z	Jared Goerges	840
69	17X	Caleb Helms	838
70	20N	Hunter Schuerenberg	830
71	2C	Wayne Johnson	820
72	07	Ryan Smith	810
73	71M	Dave Blaney	790
74	3	Sammy Swindell	774
75	71A	R.J. Johnson	770
76	57 17x	Kyle Larson	760
77	7J	Joe Swanson	738
78	12	Lynton Jeffery	736
79	98	Sean Watts	720
80	27Z	Sean Zemunik	692
81	17H	Ryan Bickett	688
82	87	Alan Krimes	682
83	68	Chase Johnson	676
84	16C	Matt Campbell	668
85	00	Dane Lorence	660
86	7K	Cale Conley	660
87	15H	Sam Hafertepe Jr.	654
88	51B	Joe B. Miller	642
89	09	Matt Juhl	632
90	1D	Justin Henderson	632
91	22	Cori Andrews	630
92	17A	Austin McCarl	624
93	84	Scott Bogucki	616
94	5J	Jeremy Schultz	608
95	39	Spencer Bayston	606
96	1ST	Gary Taylor	598
97	71	Kevin Thomas Jr.	566
98	83C	Adam Cruea	562
99	5B	Justin Barger	558
100	21K	Thomas Kennedy	558

=== Team Points ===
Pos	Car #	Team	Points Total	Wins	Top 5s	Top 10s
1	15	Tony Stewart / Curb-Agajanian Racing	11410	20	66	74
2	49	Kasey Kahne Racing with Mike Curb	11200	5	56	72
3	5	CJB Motorsports	11082	18	43	68
4	9	Kasey Kahne Racing with Mike Curb	10718	3	28	56
5	2	Larson Marks Racing	10702	8	30	56
6	41	JJR-Marshall Racing	10496	4	27	51
7	93	Haudenschild Racing	10118	0	12	41
8	11k	Steve Kinser Racing	9946	1	7	28
9	1s	Shark Racing	9854	4	11	32
10	19	Brent Marks Racing	9744	0	1	23
11	7s	Sides Motorsports	9742	0	8	23
12	17	Stenhouse Jr./Wood Racing	9620	0	6	23
13	4	Destiny Motorsports	9544	0	3	18
14	W20	Greg Wilson Racing	9170	0	6	19
15	1a	Shark Racing	8216	0	0	3
16	13	Clyde Knipp Racing	7788	0	0	1
