= 2018 World of Outlaws Craftsman Sprint Car Series =

Motorsports tournament season

The 2018 World of Outlaws Craftsman Sprint Car Series was the 40th season of the winged sprint car series sanctioned by World Racing Group, competing throughout the United States. The season began with the DIRTcar Nationals at Volusia Speedway Park on February 9, and ended with the World of Outlaws World Finals at The Dirt Track at Charlotte on November 3. Donny Schatz defended his 2017 championship by winning his tenth title in 2018.

The 2018 season was the first to feature live video broadcast of every event available via pay-per-view on DIRTvision.

The season was marred by the death of Jason Johnson, following the race at Beaver Dam Raceway on June 23.

== Teams and drivers ==
No.	Race driver	Team	Chassis	Rounds
0	Bud Kaeding	Williams Motorsports	Maxim	2
0	Andy McElhannon			1
1a	Jacob Allen	Shark Racing	Triple X	31
1AJ	Trevor Mell			1
1J	Danny Jennings			1
1k	Kyle Larson	Kyle Larson Racing	RPM	1
1M	James Moughan			2
1M	Phillip Mock			1
1s	Logan Schuchart	Shark Racing	Triple X	31
1x	Scott Hunter			1
2	Shane Stewart	Kyle Larson Racing	RPM	31
2A	Austin Pierce			1
2b	Billy Chester			3
2ks	Austin McCarl			4
2m	Kerry Madsen	Big Game Motorsports		17
2s	Nathan Skaggs			1
2W	Scotty Neitzel			1
2X	Brian Smith			1
3	Sammy Swindell			5
3	Jac Haudenschild			3
3	Dakota Jackson			1
3	Tim Kaeding			3
3c	Tanner Thorson	TRI-C Motorsports	Spike	5
3P	Sawyer Phillips			1
4	Parker Price-Miller	Destiny Motorsports	Triple X	12
4	Kasey Kahne	Kasey Kahne Racing with Mike Curb		1
4B	Steve Butler			1
4k	Kasey Kahne	Kasey Kahne Racing with Mike Curb		5
4k	Kody Kinser			1
4s	Danny Smith			1
4x	Eric Schulz			3
5	David Gravel	CJB Motorsports	TI22	31
5A	Justin Barger			1
5B	Chase Briscoe	Chase Briscoe Racing		2
5B	Logan Seavey	Chase Briscoe Racing		1
5B	Christopher Bell	Chase Briscoe Racing		1
5C	Christopher Bell	Chase Briscoe Racing		1
5H	Michael "Buddy" Kofoid			2
5H	Andy Teunessen			1
5J	Jeremy Schultz			2
5QB	Quentin Blonde			3
5w	Lucas Wolfe	Lucas Wolfe Racing		3
5x	Kory Bates			1
5x	Justin Peck			23
6N	Greg Nikitenko			2
7	John Carney			2
7	Carson McCarl			4
7k	Cale Conley	Dave Jessup Racing		3
7S	Tim Kaeding	Sides Motorsports	Maxim	3
7S	Jason Sides	Sides Motorsports	Maxim	28
7SS	Jason Sides	Sides Motorsports	Maxim	3
7W	Tasker Phillips			4
7X	Critter Malone			1
8	Jack Croaker			2
8H	Jade Hastings			1
8s	Steve Short			1
9	Daryn Pittman	Kasey Kahne Racing with Mike Curb	RPM	31
9JR	Derek Hagar			2
9N	Wade Nygaard			2
9P	Rager Phillips			1
9X	Paul Nienhiser			8
00	Dane Lorenc	Lorenc Racing		15
01	Matt Vandervere			1
05	Gary Taylor	Loyet Motorsports		1
05	Colin Smith			3
07	Gerard McIntyre			1
09	Matt Juhl			4
10	Matthew Moles	SPF Racing		4
10h	Chad Kemenah	Hunter Racing	Maxim	5
10P	Jim Perricone			3
10TRB	Bob Martin			1
10V	Matt Vandervere			3
11	Max McGhee	McGhee Motorsports		3
11	Dominic Scelzi	McGhee Motorsports		1
11k	Kraig Kinser	Steve Kinser Racing	DRC	31
11R	Chase Ridenour			1
12	Robert Ballou	Robert Ballou Motorsports	Boss	1
12	Lynton Jeffrey			4
12N	Cole Duncan			2
12W	Dale Wester			2
13	Clyde Knipp	Clyde Knipp Racing	Maxim	29
13JT	Mark Dobmeier	Jimco Motorsports	Eagle	8
13x	Paul McMahan	Buch13 Racing		7
14	Jason Meyers	H.P. Myatt / Jason Meyers	KPC	3
14	Jody Rosenboom			3
14	Tom Egeland			1
14	Bill Holler			1
14AJ	Wayne Modjeski			2
14K	Tori Knutson			3
14T	Jimmy Bridgeman			1
14x	Jeff Swindell			1
15	Donny Schatz	Tony Stewart/Curb-Agajanian Racing	J&J	31
15h	Sam Hafertepe Jr.	Hill's Racing Team	Cool	2
15M	Bobby Mincer			1
16	Travis Whitney			3
16A	Colby Copeland			1
17	Sheldon Haudenschild	Stenhouse Jr. - Marshall Racing	J&J	31
17a	Austin McCarl	TKS Motorsports	Maxim	4
17B	Bill Balog			5
17BC	Ricky Stenhouse Jr.	Stenhouse Jr. - Marshall Racing	J&J	1
17c	Caleb Helms	Helms Motorsports		3
17G	Channin Tankersley			3
18	Ian Madsen	KCP Racing	KCP	31
18S	Michael Summers			1
19	Brent Marks	Brent Marks Racing	Maxim	31
19AZ	Hunter Schuerenberg			3
19L	R.J. Johnson			3
19P	Paige Polyak			3
19W	Bobby Weuve			1
20	Nick Drake			1
20	Hunter Schuerenberg			2
20	Brant O'Banion			3
20	Kevin Lawson			1
20	A.J. Moeller			1
20A	Jordan Adams			2
20K	Kevin Ulmer			1
20L	Dusty Lawson			1
20N	Hunter Schuerenberg			5
W20	Greg Wilson	Greg Wilson Racing	Maxim	31
21	Brian Brown	Brian Brown Racing		15
21	Carson Short			2
21AU	Jordyn Brazier			1
21B	Carson Macedo			1
21K	Thomas Kennedy			1
21x	Carson Short			3
21x	Carson Macedo			3
22	Cori Andrews	Cori Andrews		2
22	Shane Golobic	Keith Day Racing		3
22	Cole Duncan			1
22	Todd King			1
22M	Dan McCarron			3
23	Russel Borland			3
23D	Trey Datweiler			1
23W	Scott Winters			2
24	Terry McCarl	TMAC Motorsports	Sliva	7
24	Rico Abreu	Rico Abreu Racing		12
24R	Rico Abreu	Rico Abreu Racing		2
25	Jacob Blackhurst			2
26	Joey Saldana	Rudeen Racing		16
26	Blake Egeland			1
27	Greg Hodnett	Heffner Racing		3
27	Chris Ranten			1
28	Nathan Rolfe			3
28	Brian Paulus			2
29	Willie Croft	Willie Croft Racing		5
30	C.J. Leary	Leary Racing	DRC	4
32	Chase Stockon			1
37	Mitchell Faccinto			2
39	Spencer Bayston	Swindell Speedlab		4
40	George Hobaugh			1
40	Howard Moore			1
41	Jason Johnson	Jason Johnson Racing	Maxim	30
41s	Dominic Scelzi	Gary Scelzi Motorsports		12
44	Trey Starks	Gobrecht Motorsports		6
45	Paul McMahan	Austin Wheatley		11
45	Trevor Baker	T-Rev Performance	Triple X	2
45T	Trevor Baker	T-Rev Performance	Triple X	2
45x	Eric Perrott			1
47	Dale Howard			1
48	Danny Dietrich	Gary Kauffman Racing	Maxim	1
49	Brad Sweet	Kasey Kahne Racing with Mike Curb	CS9	31
49	Brad Sweet	Kasey Kahne Racing with Mike Curb	RPM	31
49D	Shawn Dancer			2
49J	Josh Schneiderman			1
49x	Tim Shaffer	Demyan-Rudzik Racing	Triple X	11
50Z	Zach Chappell			1
51B	Joe B. Miller			2
55	Brooke Tatnell	Barry & Vivian Lewis		6
55	Nick Ranten			1
56N	Davey Heskin			1
57	Gio Scelzi	Paul Silva		5
57	Gary Taylor	Paul Silva		2
57	Kyle Larson	Paul Silva		3
63	Kevin Thomas Jr.	Dooling-Hayward Motorsports with RCR		1
64	Scotty Thiel			7
67	Ryan Robinson	Keith Kunz Motorsports		2
67	Logan Seavey	Keith Kunz Motorsports		1
67K	Tucker Klassmeyer	Keith Kunz Motorsports		2
68	Chase Johnson			3
70	Dave Blaney			3
70	Raymond Hensley			1
71	Gio Scelzi	Indy Race Parts		5
71A	R.J. Johnson			1
71H	Ryan Ruhl			1
71M	Andy Bradley			1
73	Ben Schmidt			1
75	Glen Saville			1
A79	Brandon Wimmer			2
79J	Jacob Patton			1
83	Cory Eliason	Roth Motorsports		29
83H	Justin Henderson			5
83JR	Kyle Hirst	Roth Motorsports		5
84	Brandon Hanks			1
85	Mike Terry			1
85	Dustin Daggett			1
85	Chase Wanner			1
86	Chris Ennis			1
87	Aaron Reutzel	Baughman-Reutzel Motorsports		9
88N	D.J. Netto			5
90	Randy Waitman			3
91	Cale Thomas			2
91A	Ernie Ainsworth			1
97G	Hunter Schuerenberg			6
98	Sean Watts			3
98	Clinton Boyles			2
99	Brady Bacon	Brady Bacon Racing	Triple X	5
7S50	Keoni Texeira	Sides Motorsports	Maxim	1

=== Driver and team changes ===
- - Tim Kaeding ran the #7S Sides Motorsports car for three races during the west coast swing for owner points. Jason Sides, who was also racing full-time on the WoO circuit, ran the #7SS car for those races.
- - Parker Price-Miller and Destiny Motorsports moved to a part-time effort with the Outlaws during the first California swing. The team was to chase points with the All Star Circuit of Champions tour instead for 2018.
- - Clyde Knipp moved to a part-time effort following the race at Nodak.

== Schedule and results ==
All races were broadcast live by DIRTvision.com except the 5-hour ENERGY Knoxville Nationals, which was broadcast live by thecushion.com.

No.	Date	Event	Track/Location	Winning driver	Winning team	Hard Charger award	B-Main winner	Dash winner	Fastest qualifier
1	February 9	DIRTcar Nationals	Volusia Speedway Park, Barberville, Florida	Sheldon Haudenschild	Stenhouse Jr.-Marshall Racing	Brent Marks	Greg Hodnett	Paul McMahan	Logan Schuchart
2	February 10	DIRTcar Nationals	Volusia Speedway Park, Barberville, Florida	Donny Schatz	Tony Stewart/Curb-Agajanian Racing	Sheldon Haudenschild	Sheldon Haudenschild	Jason Johnson	Shane Stewart
3	February 11	DIRTcar Nationals	Volusia Speedway Park, Barberville, Florida	Donny Schatz	Tony Stewart/Curb-Agajanian Racing	Sheldon Haudenschild	Trey Starks	Brian Brown	Paul McMahan
≠	February 24	East Texas LoneStar Shootout	Lonestar Speedway, Kilgore, Texas	Race cancelled due to inclement weather.					
4	February 28	FVP Outlaw Showdown	The Dirt Track at Las Vegas Motor Speedway, Las Vegas, Nevada	Sheldon Haudenschild	Stenhouse Jr.-Marshall Racing	Brent Marks	Kerry Madsen	Brian Brown	Sheldon Haudenschild
4	February 28	FVP Outlaw Showdown	The Dirt Track at Las Vegas Motor Speedway, Las Vegas, Nevada	Sheldon Haudenschild	Stenhouse Jr.-Marshall Racing	Brent Marks	Kerry Madsen	Brian Brown	Brian Brown
5	March 1	FVP Outlaw Showdown	The Dirt Track at Las Vegas Motor Speedway, Las Vegas, Nevada	Donny Schatz	Tony Stewart/Curb-Agajanian Racing	Logan Schuchart	Sam Hafertepe Jr.	Aaron Reutzel	Jacob Allen
5	March 1	FVP Outlaw Showdown	The Dirt Track at Las Vegas Motor Speedway, Las Vegas, Nevada	Donny Schatz	Tony Stewart/Curb-Agajanian Racing	Logan Schuchart	Sam Hafertepe Jr.	Aaron Reutzel	Hunter Schuerenberg
≠	March 3	SoCal Showdown	Perris Auto Speedway, Perris, California	Race cancelled due to inclement weather.					
6	March 9		Thunderbowl Raceway, Tulare, California	Aaron Reutzel	Baughman/Reutzel Motorsports	Tim Kaeding	Willie Croft	Cory Eliason	Gio Scelzi
6	March 9		Thunderbowl Raceway, Tulare, California	Aaron Reutzel	Baughman/Reutzel Motorsports	Tim Kaeding	Willie Croft	Cory Eliason	Sheldon Haudenschild
≠	March 10		Thunderbowl Raceway, Tulare, California	Race cancelled due to inclement weather.					
≠	March 16	FVP Platinum Battery Western Spring Shootout	Stockton Dirt Track, Stockton, California	Race cancelled due to inclement weather.					
7	March 17	FVP Platinum Battery Western Spring Shootout	Stockton Dirt Track, Stockton, California	Cory Eliason	Roth Motorsports	Daryn Pittman	Sheldon Haudenschild	Cory Eliason	Brian Brown
7	March 17	FVP Platinum Battery Western Spring Shootout	Stockton Dirt Track, Stockton, California	Cory Eliason	Roth Motorsports	Daryn Pittman	Sheldon Haudenschild	Cory Eliason	Logan Schuchart
≠	March 23	Ocean Outlaw Showdown	Ocean Speedway, Watsonville, California	Race cancelled due to inclement weather.					
8	March 24		Bakersfield Speedway, Bakersfield, California	Sheldon Haudenschild	Stenhouse Jr.-Marshall Racing	Donny Schatz	Donny Schatz	Jason Johnson	Jason Johnson
9	April 7	Arizona Desert Shootout	Arizona Speedway, Queen Creek, Arizona	Donny Schatz	Tony Stewart/Curb-Agajanian Racing	Logan Schuchart	-	Cory Eliason	Ian Madsen
10	April 20		Riverside International Speedway, West Memphis, Arkansas	Daryn Pittman	Kasey Kahne Racing with Mike Curb	David Gravel	David Gravel	Sheldon Haudenschild	Sheldon Haudenschild
11	April 21	Spring Classic	Federated Auto Parts Raceway at I-55, Pevely, Missouri	Daryn Pittman	Kasey Kahne Racing with Mike Curb	Brent Marks	Sammy Swindell	Donny Schatz	Jason Sides
11	April 21	Spring Classic	Federated Auto Parts Raceway at I-55, Pevely, Missouri	Daryn Pittman	Kasey Kahne Racing with Mike Curb	Brent Marks	Sammy Swindell	Donny Schatz	Brad Sweet
12	April 26		Cotton Bowl Speedway, Paige, Texas	David Gravel	CJB Motorsports	Logan Schuchart	-	David Gravel	David Gravel
13	April 27	Texas Outlaw Nationals	Devil's Bowl Speedway, Mesquite, Texas	Daryn Pittman	Kasey Kahne Racing with Mike Curb	Sheldon Haudenschild	-	Daryn Pittman	Jason Johnson
14	April 28	Texas Outlaw Nationals	Devil's Bowl Speedway, Mesquite, Texas	Donny Schatz	Tony Stewart/Curb-Agajanian Racing	{{tooltipDavid Gravel|+9; started 19th, finished 10th}}	-	Brad Sweet	Jason Johnson
15	May 4		Lake Ozark Speedway, Eldon, Missouri	Donny Schatz	Tony Stewart/Curb-Agajanian Racing	Kraig Kinser	Brian Brown	Jacob Allen	Spencer Bayston
16	May 5		Salina Highbanks Speedway, Salina, Oklahoma	Brad Sweet	Kasey Kahne Racing with Mike Curb	Daryn Pittman	-	Shane Stewart	Jacob Allen
17	May 11	#LetsRaceTwo	Eldora Speedway, Rossburg, Ohio	Donny Schatz	Tony Stewart/Curb-Agajanian Racing	Daryn Pittman	Brady Bacon	Cole Duncan	Cole Duncan
18	May 12	#LetsRaceTwo	Eldora Speedway, Rossburg, Ohio	Donny Schatz	Tony Stewart/Curb-Agajanian Racing	Daryn Pittman	Brent Marks	Donny Schatz	David Gravel
19	May 13		Tri-State Speedway, Haubstadt, Indiana	David Gravel	CJB Motorsports	Parker Price-Miller	Aaron Reutzel	David Gravel	Justin Peck
19	May 13		Tri-State Speedway, Haubstadt, Indiana	David Gravel	CJB Motorsports	Parker Price-Miller	Aaron Reutzel	David Gravel	Kyle Larson
≠	May 18	Morgan Cup	Williams Grove Speedway, Mechanicsburg, Pennsylvania	Race cancelled due to inclement weather.					
≠	May 19	Morgan Cup	Williams Grove Speedway, Mechanicsburg, Pennsylvania	Race cancelled due to inclement weather.					
≠	May 22		Bridgeport Speedway (3/8th mile), Swedesboro, New Jersey	Race cancelled due to inclement weather.					
20	May 25	Outlaw Showdown	The Dirt Track at Charlotte Motor Speedway, Concord, North Carolina	Donny Schatz	Tony Stewart/Curb-Agajanian Racing	Brent Marks	Ricky Stenhouse Jr.	Donny Schatz	Logan Schuchart
21	May 28	Memorial Day Spectacular presented by KOI Auto Parts	Lawrenceburg Speedway, Lawrenceburg, Indiana	Brad Sweet	Kasey Kahne Racing with Mike Curb	Aaron Reutzel	Joey Saldana	Paul McMahan	David Gravel
22	June 1	Rumble in Michigan	I-96 Speedway, Lake Odessa, Michigan	David Gravel	CJB Motorsports	Brent Marks	Logan Schuchart	Sheldon Haudenschild	Logan Schuchart
23	June 2	Badger 40	Wilmot Raceway, Wilmot, Wisconsin	Brent Marks	Brent Marks Racing	Matt Vandervere	Jason Sides	Daryn Pittman	Kraig Kinser
24	June 5	FVP Platinum Battery Showdown	Fairbury American Legion Speedway, Fairbury, Illinois	Sheldon Haudenschild	Stenhouse Jr.-Marshall Racing	David Gravel	Tanner Thorson	Sheldon Haudenschild	Jacob Allen
25	June 8	AGCO Jackson Nationals	Jackson Motorplex, Jackson, Minnesota	Jason Johnson	Jason Johnson Racing	David Gravel	Justin Henderson	Lynton Jeffrey	Shane Stewart
25	June 8	AGCO Jackson Nationals	Jackson Motorplex, Jackson, Minnesota	Jason Johnson	Jason Johnson Racing	David Gravel	Justin Henderson	Lynton Jeffrey	Lynton Jeffrey
26	June 9	AGCO Jackson Nationals	Jackson Motorplex, Jackson, Minnesota	Jason Johnson	Jason Johnson Racing	David Gravel	David Gravel	Jacob Allen	Lynton Jeffrey
26	June 9	AGCO Jackson Nationals	Jackson Motorplex, Jackson, Minnesota	Jason Johnson	Jason Johnson Racing	David Gravel	David Gravel	Jacob Allen	Tim Kaeding
27	June 9	AGCO Jackson Nationals	Jackson Motorplex, Jackson, Minnesota	Donny Schatz	Tony Stewart/Curb-Agajanian Racing	Dominic Scelzi	Justin Henderson	Jason Johnson	-
28	June 15	Northern Tour	River Cities Speedway, Grand Forks, North Dakota	Donny Schatz	Tony Stewart/Curb-Agajanian Racing	Mark Dobmeier	Dominic Scelzi	Kerry Madsen	Thomas Kennedy
29	June 17	Magic City Showdown	Nodak Speedway, Minot, North Dakota	Daryn Pittman	Kasey Kahne Racing with Mike Curb	Sheldon Haudenschild	Greg Nikitenko	Cory Eliason	Daryn Pittman
≠	June 22		Farley Speedway, Farley, Iowa	Race cancelled due to inclement weather.					
30	June 23	Jim "JB" Boyd Memorial presented by Karavan Trailers	Beaver Dam Raceway, Beaver Dam, Wisconsin	Daryn Pittman	Kasey Kahne Racing with Mike Curb	Logan Schuchart	Logan Schuchart	Daryn Pittman	Jason Johnson
31	June 29	Brownells Big Guns Bash	Knoxville Raceway, Knoxville, Iowa	Donny Schatz	Tony Stewart/Curb-Agajanian Racing	Shane Stewart	Dominic Scelzi	Donny Schatz	Kerry Madsen
31	June 29	Brownells Big Guns Bash	Knoxville Raceway, Knoxville, Iowa	Donny Schatz	Tony Stewart/Curb-Agajanian Racing	Shane Stewart	Dominic Scelzi	Donny Schatz	Ian Madsen
32	June 30	Brownells Big Guns Bash	Knoxville Raceway, Knoxville, Iowa	David Gravel	CJB Motorsports	Davey Heskin	Kraig Kinser	Donny Schatz	Brad Sweet
32	June 30	Brownells Big Guns Bash	Knoxville Raceway, Knoxville, Iowa	David Gravel	CJB Motorsports	Davey Heskin	Kraig Kinser	Donny Schatz	Donny Schatz
33	July 6	FVP Platinum Battery Showdown	Cedar Lake Speedway, New Richmond, Wisconsin	Brad Sweet	Kasey Kahne Racing with Mike Curb	Donny Schatz	Kerry Madsen	Brad Sweet	Brad Sweet
34	July 7	FVP Platinum Battery Showdown	Cedar Lake Speedway, New Richmond, Wisconsin	Kerry Madsen	Big Game Motorsports	David Gravel	-	Brad Sweet	Shane Stewart
35	July 10	Ohio Logistics Brad Doty Classic	Attica Raceway Park, Attica, Ohio	Donny Schatz	Tony Stewart/Curb-Agajanian Racing	Sheldon Haudenschild	Lee Jacobs	Joey Saldana	Joey Saldana
35	July 10	Ohio Logistics Brad Doty Classic	Attica Raceway Park, Attica, Ohio	Donny Schatz	Tony Stewart/Curb-Agajanian Racing	Sheldon Haudenschild	Lee Jacobs	Brent Marks	Tim Shaffer
36	July 12	Jokers Wild	Eldora Speedway, Rossburg, Ohio	Shane Stewart	Kyle Larson Racing	Brent Marks	Rico Abreu	David Gravel	Tim Shaffer
36	July 12	Jokers Wild	Eldora Speedway, Rossburg, Ohio	Shane Stewart	Kyle Larson Racing	Brent Marks	Rico Abreu	David Gravel	Brad Sweet
37	July 13	Knight Before the Kings Royal	Eldora Speedway, Rossburg, Ohio	Donny Schatz	Tony Stewart/Curb-Agajanian Racing	Dave Blaney	Trey Starks	Brian Brown	Chad Kemenah
37	July 13	Knight Before the Kings Royal	Eldora Speedway, Rossburg, Ohio	Donny Schatz	Tony Stewart/Curb-Agajanian Racing	Dave Blaney	Trey Starks	Hunter Schuerenberg	Greg Wilson
38	July 14	Kings Royal	Eldora Speedway, Rossburg, Ohio	Donny Schatz	Tony Stewart/Curb-Agajanian Racing	Rico Abreu	Greg Wilson	-	Christopher Bell
39	July 17	Don Martin Memorial Silver Cup	Lernerville Speedway, Sarver, Pennsylvania	Kyle Larson	Silva Motorsports	Kasey Kahne	Cory Eliason	Tim Shaffer	Kyle Larson
40	July 19	Gettysburg Clash	Lincoln Speedway, Abbottstown, Pennsylvania	Freddie Rahmer	Rahmer Brothers Racing	Brent Marks	Brent Marks	David Gravel	Brad Sweet
41	July 20	Champion Racing Oil Summer Nationals	Williams Grove Speedway, Mechanicsburg, Pennsylvania	Lance Dewease	Don Kreitz Racing	Brent Marks	Cory Haas	Lucas Wolfe	Brian Montieth
≠	July 21	Champion Racing Oil Summer Nationals	Williams Grove Speedway, Mechanicsburg, Pennsylvania	Race cancelled due to inclement weather.					
≠	July 25		Airborne Park Speedway, Plattsburgh, New York	Race cancelled due to inclement weather.					
42	July 27	The Big "R" Outlaw Showdown	Ransomville Speedway, Ransomville, New York	David Gravel	CJB Motorsports	Sheldon Haudenschild	-	Donny Schatz	Brad Sweet
43	July 29	Empire State Challenge	Weedsport Speedway, Weedsport, New York	Brent Marks	Brent Marks Racing	Donny Schatz	-	Brent Marks	Daryn Pittman
44	August 3	Night Before the Ironman	Federated Auto Parts Raceway at I-55, Pevely, Missouri	Rico Abreu	Rico Abreu Racing	Tim Shaffer	Sheldon Haudenschild	Rico Abreu	Kraig Kinser
45	August 4	Ironman 55	Federated Auto Parts Raceway at I-55, Pevely, Missouri	Logan Schuchart	Shark Racing	Brent Marks	Cale Thomas	Logan Schuchart	Logan Schuchart
≈	August 8	5-hour ENERGY Knoxville Nationals	Knoxville Raceway, Knoxville, Iowa	Greg Hodnett	Heffner Racing	Donny Schatz	Donny Schatz	-	Logan Schuchart
≈	August 9	5-hour ENERGY Knoxville Nationals	Knoxville Raceway, Knoxville, Iowa	Brad Sweet	Kasey Kahne Racing with Mike Curb	Shane Stewart	Carson Macedo	-	Carson Macedo
≈	August 10	5-hour ENERGY Knoxville Nationals	Knoxville Raceway, Knoxville, Iowa	Logan Schuchart	Shark Racing	Jamie Veal	-	-	Logan Schuchart
≈	August 10	5-hour ENERGY Knoxville Nationals	Knoxville Raceway, Knoxville, Iowa	Logan Schuchart	Shark Racing	Jamie Veal	-	-	Brian Brown
≈	August 10	SPEED SPORT World Challenge	Knoxville Raceway, Knoxville, Iowa	Dominic Scelzi	Gary Scelzi Motorsports	Kerry Madsen	-	-	-
46	August 11	5-hour ENERGY Knoxville Nationals	Knoxville Raceway, Knoxville, Iowa	Brad Sweet	Kasey Kahne Racing with Mike Curb	David Gravel	Parker Price-Miller	-	-
47	August 17	2nd Leg of the Northern Tour	River Cities Speedway, Grand Forks, North Dakota	Donny Schatz	Tony Stewart/Curb-Agajanian Racing	Mark Dobmeier	Logan Schuchart	Sheldon Haudenschild	Brad Sweet
48	August 18	Duel in the Dakotas	Red River Valley Speedway, West Fargo, North Dakota	Donny Schatz	Tony Stewart/Curb-Agajanian Racing	Logan Schuchart	Logan Schuchart	David Gravel	Donny Schatz
49	August 24	Rushmore Outlaw Showdown	Black Hills Speedway, Rapid City, South Dakota	Brad Sweet	Kasey Kahne Racing with Mike Curb	Greg Wilson	-	Jacob Allen	Daryn Pittman
50	August 25	NAPA Auto Parts & Visit Billings presents The Brawl at Big Sky	BMP Speedway, Billings, Montana	Daryn Pittman	Kasey Kahne Racing with Mike Curb	Brad Sweet	-	Jacob Allen	Donny Schatz
51	August 31	Outlaw Energy Showdown	Skagit Speedway, Alger, Washington	Sheldon Haudenschild	Stenhouse Jr./Marshall Racing	Ian Madsen	Trey Starks	Rico Abreu	Jason Solwold
52	September 1	Outlaw Energy Showdown	Skagit Speedway, Alger, Washington	Daryn Pittman	Kasey Kahne Racing with Mike Curb	David Gravel	Jacob Allen	Daryn Pittman	Logan Schuchart
53	September 3		Grays Harbor Raceway, Elma, Washington	Donny Schatz	Tony Stewart/Curb-Agajanian Racing	Greg Wilson	-	Donny Schatz	Logan Schuchart
54	September 5		Willamette Speedway, Lebanon, Oregon	Donny Schatz	Tony Stewart/Curb-Agajanian Racing	Rico Abreu	-	Donny Schatz	Joey Saldana
55	September 7	Gold Cup Race of Champions	Silver Dollar Speedway, Chico, California	Brad Sweet	Kasey Kahne Racing with Mike Curb	Daryn Pittman	David Gravel	Tim Kaeding	Michael Kofoid
55	September 7	Gold Cup Race of Champions	Silver Dollar Speedway, Chico, California	Brad Sweet	Kasey Kahne Racing with Mike Curb	Daryn Pittman	David Gravel	Tim Kaeding	Bud Kaeding
56	September 8	Gold Cup Race of Champions	Silver Dollar Speedway, Chico, California	Rico Abreu	Rico Abreu Racing	DJ Netto	Joey Saldana	Michael Kolfoid	Joey Saldana
56	September 8	Gold Cup Race of Champions	Silver Dollar Speedway, Chico, California	Rico Abreu	Rico Abreu Racing	DJ Netto	Joey Saldana	Michael Kolfoid	Justin Sanders
57	September 12	49er Gold Rush Classic presented by Riebes NAPA	Placerville Speedway, Placerville, California	Brad Sweet	Kasey Kahne Racing with Mike Curb	David Gravel	Bobby McMahan	Rico Abreu	Andy Forsberg
58	September 14	Wine Country Outlaw Showdown	Calistoga Speedway, Calistoga, California	Daryn Pittman	Kasey Kahne Racing with Mike Curb	Shane Golobic	-	Daryn Pittman	Donny Schatz
59	September 15	Wine Country Outlaw Showdown	Calistoga Speedway, Calistoga, California	Cory Eliason	Roth Motorsports	Greg Wilson	Chase Johnson	Cory Eliason	Daryn Pittman
60	September 21	BeFour the Crowns Showdown	Eldora Speedway, Rossburg, Ohio	Brent Marks	Brent Marks Racing	Greg Wilson	Rico Abreu	Logan Schuchart	Gio Scelzi
60	September 21	BeFour the Crowns Showdown	Eldora Speedway, Rossburg, Ohio	Brent Marks	Brent Marks Racing	Greg Wilson	Rico Abreu	Logan Schuchart	Hunter Schuerenberg
61	September 22	Commonwealth Clash	Lernerville Speedway, Sarver, Pennsylvania	Brad Sweet	Kasey Kahne Racing with Mike Curb	Danny Dietrich	Sye Lynch	Daryn Pittman	Sheldon Haudenschild
62	September 28	Champion Racing Oil National Open	Williams Grove Speedway, Mechanicsburg, Pennsylvania	Gio Scelzi	Indy Race Parts	Donny Schatz	Lance Dewease	David Gravel	Ian Madsen
62	September 28	Champion Racing Oil National Open	Williams Grove Speedway, Mechanicsburg, Pennsylvania	Gio Scelzi	Indy Race Parts	Donny Schatz	Lance Dewease	Gio Scelzi	Logan Schuchart
63	September 29	Champion Racing Oil National Open	Williams Grove Speedway, Mechanicsburg, Pennsylvania	Lance Dewease	Don Kreitz Racing	Shane Stewart	David Gravel	Brock Zearfoss	Gio Scelzi
63	September 29	Champion Racing Oil National Open	Williams Grove Speedway, Mechanicsburg, Pennsylvania	Lance Dewease	Don Kreitz Racing	Shane Stewart	David Gravel	Lance Dewease	Brian Brown
64	October 6		Fulton Speedway, Fulton, New York	Logan Schuchart	Shark Racing	Larry Wight	-	Kraig Kinser	Shane Stewart
≠	October 12		Jacksonville Speedway, Jacksonville, Illinois	Race cancelled due to inclement weather after previous postponements due to inclement weather on April 13 and again on June 27 due to the recent death of Jason Johnson three days prior.					
65	October 13	Wabash Clash	Terre Haute Action Track, Terre Haute, Indiana	Brad Sweet	Kasey Kahne Racing with Mike Curb	Donny Schatz	Spencer Bayston	Brad Sweet	Brian Brown
66	October 14	#LastCallForThemAll	Eldora Speedway, Rossburg, Ohio	Christopher Bell	Tony Stewart/Curb-Agajanian Racing	Logan Schuchart	Sam Hafertepe	Tim Shaffer	Gio Scelzi
66	October 14	#LastCallForThemAll	Eldora Speedway, Rossburg, Ohio	Christopher Bell	Tony Stewart/Curb-Agajanian Racing	Logan Schuchart	Sam Hafertepe	Tim Shaffer	Carson Macedo
67	October 19	FVP Platinum Battery Shootout	Lakeside Speedway, Kansas City, Kansas	Daryn Pittman	Kasey Kahne Racing with Mike Curb	Brock Zearfoss	Brock Zearfoss	Daryn Pittman	Brad Sweet
68	October 20	Outlaw Boot Hill Showdown	Dodge City Raceway Park, Dodge City, Kansas	Donny Schatz	Tony Stewart/Curb-Agajanian Racing	Sam Hafertepe	-	Ian Madsen	Ian Madsen
≠	October 26	Nittany Showdown	Port Royal Speedway, Port Royal, Pennsylvania	Race cancelled due to inclement weather.					
69	October 28	Tuscarora 50	Port Royal Speedway, Port Royal, Pennsylvania	Donny Schatz	Tony Stewart/Curb-Agajanian Racing	Daryn Pittman	Ian Madsen	-	Carson Macedo
69	October 28	Tuscarora 50	Port Royal Speedway, Port Royal, Pennsylvania	Donny Schatz	Tony Stewart/Curb-Agajanian Racing	Daryn Pittman	Ian Madsen	-	Brian Brown
≈	November 1	World of Outlaws World Finals	The Dirt Track at Charlotte Motor Speedway, Concord, North Carolina	Only the qualifying portion is held on the first day of the World Finals. The first set is for the first race, and the second set is for the second race.					Paige Polyak
≈	November 1	World of Outlaws World Finals	The Dirt Track at Charlotte Motor Speedway, Concord, North Carolina	Only the qualifying portion is held on the first day of the World Finals. The first set is for the first race, and the second set is for the second race.					Parker Price-Miller
≈	November 1	World of Outlaws World Finals	The Dirt Track at Charlotte Motor Speedway, Concord, North Carolina	Only the qualifying portion is held on the first day of the World Finals. The first set is for the first race, and the second set is for the second race.					Parker Price-Miller
≈	November 1	World of Outlaws World Finals	The Dirt Track at Charlotte Motor Speedway, Concord, North Carolina	Only the qualifying portion is held on the first day of the World Finals. The first set is for the first race, and the second set is for the second race.					David Gravel
70	November 3	World of Outlaws World Finals	The Dirt Track at Charlotte Motor Speedway, Concord, North Carolina	Ian Madsen	KCP Racing	Logan Schuchart	Parker Price-Miller	Tim Shaffer	-
70	November 3	World of Outlaws World Finals	The Dirt Track at Charlotte Motor Speedway, Concord, North Carolina	Ian Madsen	KCP Racing	Logan Schuchart	Parker Price-Miller	Aaron Reutzel	-
71	November 3	World of Outlaws World Finals	The Dirt Track at Charlotte Motor Speedway, Concord, North Carolina	Donny Schatz	Tony Stewart/Curb-Agajanian Racing	Kraig Kinser	Ian Madsen	Spencer Bayston	-
71	November 3	World of Outlaws World Finals	The Dirt Track at Charlotte Motor Speedway, Concord, North Carolina	Donny Schatz	Tony Stewart/Curb-Agajanian Racing	Kraig Kinser	Ian Madsen	Carson Macedo	-

- ≠ indicates the race was canceled
- ≈ indicates the race was a non-points event

=== Schedule notes and changes ===
- February 23 race at Cotton Bowl Speedway was postponed due to weather conditions. The race was rescheduled for April 25.
- East Texas Lonestar Showdown (February 24) at Lonestar Speedway was canceled due to weather conditions.
- SoCal Showdown (March 3) at Perris Auto Speedway was canceled due to weather conditions.
- March 10 race at Thunderbowl Raceway was canceled due to weather conditions.
- Night #1 of the FVP Platinum Battery Western Spring Shootout (March 16) at Stockton Dirt Track was canceled due to weather conditions.
- Brad Sweet Placerville Short Track Shootout presented by NAPA Auto Parts (March 21) at Placerville Speedway was postponed due to weather conditions. The race was rescheduled for September 12 as the 49er Gold Rush Classic presented by Riebes NAPA.
- Ocean Outlaw Showdown (March 23) at Ocean Speedway was canceled due to weather conditions.
- April 13 race at Jacksonville Speedway was postponed to June 27 due to weather conditions.
- April 14 race at Tri-State Speedway was postponed due to weather conditions. The race was rescheduled for April 22.
- April 22 race at Tri-State Speedway was postponed for the second time this season due to weather conditions. The race was rescheduled for May 13.
- April 25 race at Cotton Bowl Speedway was postponed for the second time due to weather conditions. The race was rescheduled for April 26.
- Gettysburg Clash (May 16) at Lincoln Speedway was postponed due to weather conditions. It was originally postponed to May 17, and again to July 19 when inclement weather persisted.
- Night 1 of the Morgan Cup (May 18) at Williams Grove Speedway was canceled due to weather conditions.
- Night 2 of the Morgan Cup (May 19) at Williams Grove Speedway was canceled due to weather conditions.
- May 22 race at Bridgeport Speedway was cancelled due to weather conditions.
- May 30 race at Fairbury American Legion Speedway was postponed due to weather conditions. The race was rescheduled to June 5.
- June 22 race at Farley Speedway was canceled due to weather conditions.
- June 27 race at Jacksonville Speedway was postponed out of respect for the Johnson family and to allow drivers, officials and crews to grieve the loss of a fellow friend and competitor. The race was rescheduled for October 12.
- Night 2 of the Champion Racing Oil Summer Nationals (July 21) at Williams Grove Speedway was canceled due to weather conditions.
- July 25 race at Airborne Park Speedway was canceled due to weather conditions.
- Tuscarora 50 (September 8), originally an event sanctioned by the All Star Circuit of Champions, was postponed due to weather conditions. The race was rescheduled for October 27, and was added to the World of Outlaws schedule as the All Star Circuit of Champions season was already complete.
- October 12 race at Jacksonville Speedway was canceled due to weather conditions.
- Nittany Showdown (October 26) at Port Royal Speedway was canceled due to weather conditions.
- Tuscarora 50 (October 27) at Port Royal Speedway was postponed to October 28 due to rain.
- Night 2 of the World of Outlaws World Finals (November 2) at The Dirt Track at Charlotte was postponed due to weather conditions. The race was rescheduled for November 3.

== See also ==
- - 2018 World of Outlaws Craftsman Late Model Series
- - 2018 Super DIRTcar Series
