= Wilmot Raceway =

Motorsports venue in Wisconsin

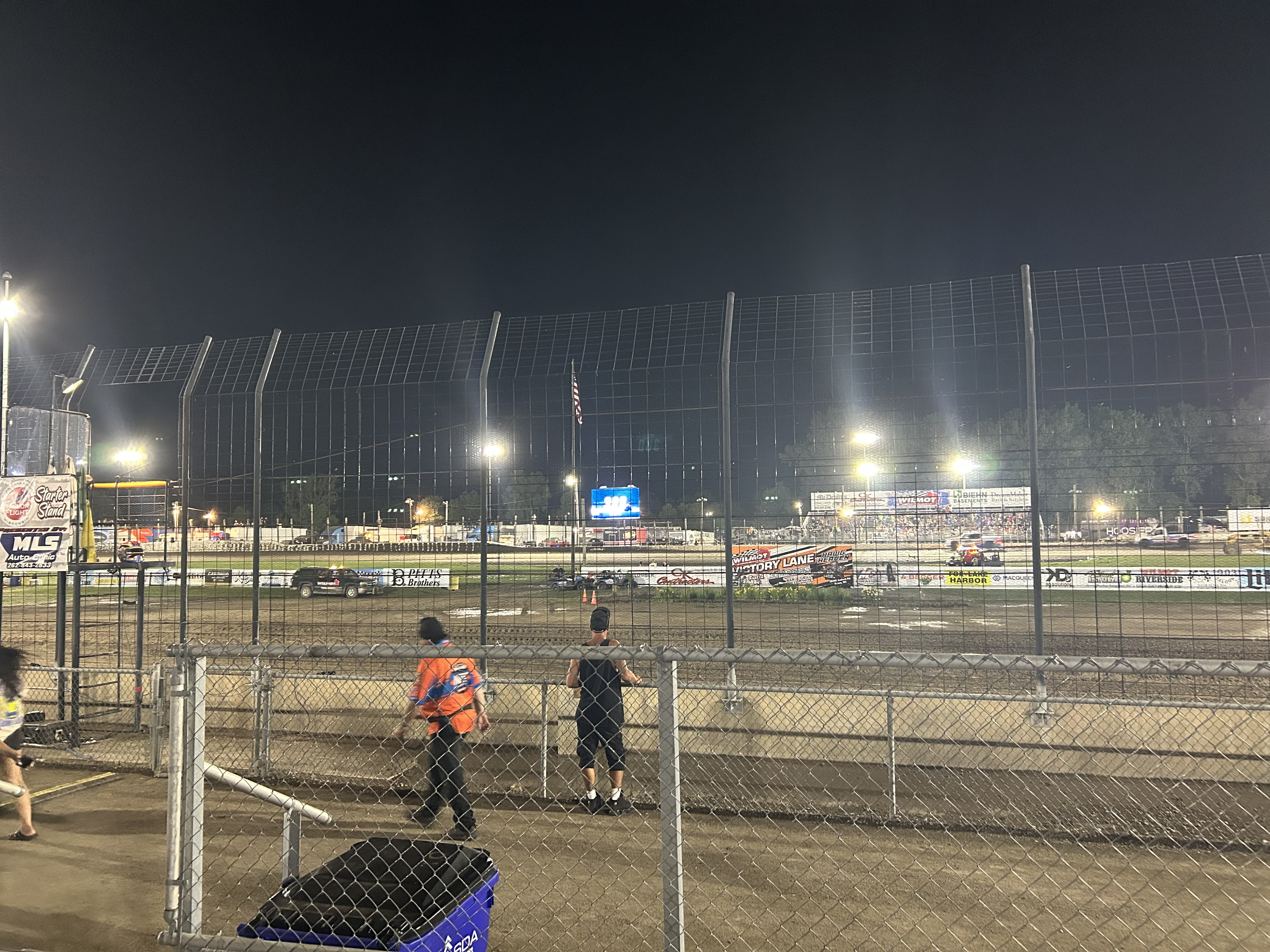
- Wilmot Raceway in 2025 during a World of Outlaws event
- Location: Wilmot, Wisconsin; 30820 111th St, Wilmot, WI,
- Coordinates: 42.519034°N 88.185763°W
- Opened: 1951
- Major events: Current: World of Outlaws (2006, 2008, 2014, 2016-present); IRA Sprints (1967-present); Former: World of Outlaws Late Model Series (2024-2025)
- Website: www.wilmotraceway.com

Oval (present)
- Surface: Clay
- Turns: 4
- Banking: Semi
- Race lap record: 12.199 (Bill Balog, World of Outlaws, 2023, Qualifying)

Wilmot Raceway is a three-eighth (3/8) mile banked clay oval track located in Wilmot Wisconsin, US. It holds dirt track racing and holds a race for World of Outlaws. It also hosts demolition derbys, mini-sprints, street stocks, modifieds and other track events.

== Events ==
=== Racing events ===
==== Weekly racing ====
Wilmot Raceway hosts weekly sprint races on Saturday nights called “Saturday Night Thunder”. Beginning in 2026, they introduced weekly theme nights.

==== IRA Sprints ====
Since the series' inception in 1967, the IRA Sprints have been racing at Wilmot. Wilmot is also where they held their first race.

=== World of Outlaws (Sprint Cars) ===
The track hosts an annual World of Outlaws race event the second weekend of July.

==== World of Outlaws Sprint Cars A-Feature Winners ====
Year	Date	Driver
2006	October 4	Mark Dobmeier
2008	August 1	Daryn Pittman
2014	May 9	David Gravel
2016	July 30	David Gravel (2)
2017	July 29	David Gravel (3)
2018	June 2	Brent Marks
2019	July 13	Donny Schatz
2020	July 11	David Gravel (4)
2021	July 10	Brad Sweet
2022	July 9	Carson Macedo
2023	July 8	Carson Macedo (2)
2024	July 12	Carson Macedo (3)
2024	July 13	Donny Schatz (2)
2025	July 11	Event cancelled
2025	July 12	Buddy Kofoid
2026	July 10	Buddy Kofoid (2)
2026	July 11	Sheldon Haudenschild

=== World of Outlaws (Late Models) ===
The track previously hosted an annual World of Outlaws Late Model Series race event on the last Monday of July.

==== World of Outlaws Late Models A-Feature Winners ====
Year	Date	Driver
2024	July 29	Event cancelled
2025	July 28	Ryan Gustin

==== Fall Classic ====
In 2024, Wilmot Raceway introduced the Fall Classic, which would be the last races of the year.

=== Other events ===
==== Kenosha County Fair ====
Wilmot Raceway is on the site of the Kenosha County Fair. They host events such as tractor pulling, demolition derbys and racing.

== Track records ==
- 410 Sprint Car Bill Balog — 12.199 on July 8, 2023
