= Kings Royal =

Racing event

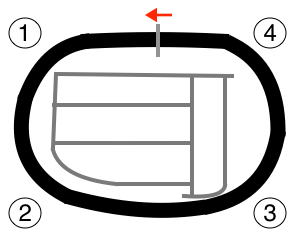

World of Outlaws NOS Energy Drink Sprint Car Series
- Venue: Eldora Speedway
- Location: Allen Township, Darke County, Ohio, United States
- First race: 1984
- Distance: 20 mi (32 km)
- Laps: 40
- Previous names: Mopar Kings Royal (1999); Kings Royal presented by Crown Royal (2006)
- Most wins (driver): Steve Kinser (7)

Circuit information
- Surface: Dirt
- Length: 0.5 mi (0.80 km)
- Turns: 4

The Kings Royal is a major sprint car racing event held annually at Eldora Speedway near New Weston, Ohio, United States.

Regarded as one of the world's most prestigious sprint car races, it awarded a $200,000 USD winner's prize since 2025.

== History ==
=== First runnings ===
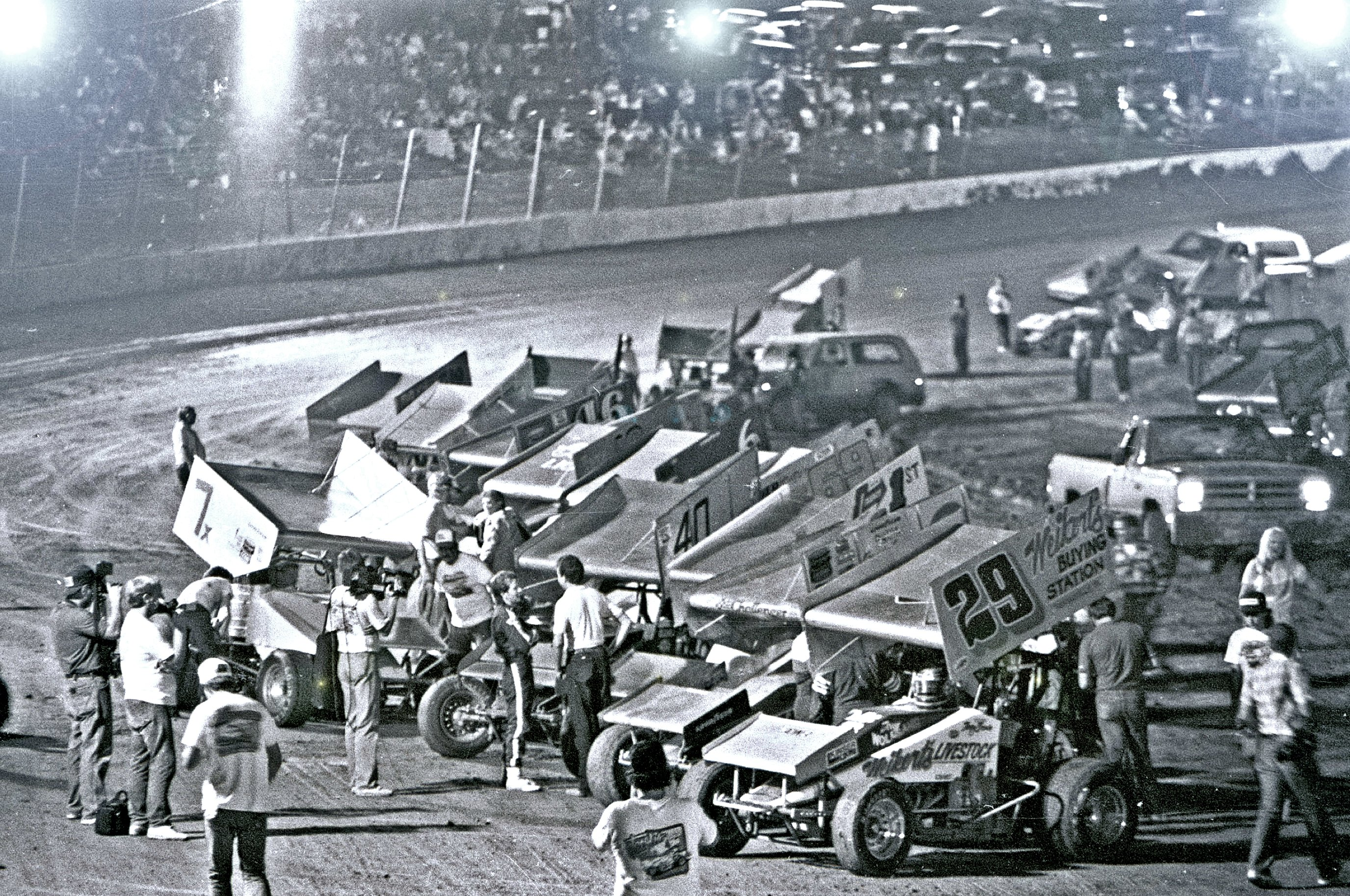
Kings Royal pre-race in 1987

First run in 1984, the Kings Royal saw Eldora Speedway promoter Earl Baltes offering $50,000 to the winner of a 40-lap event. Steve Kinser won the inaugural race.

=== Format changes ===
Beginning in 2016, a preliminary full feature, the "Joker's Wild", was held on the Thursday before the Saturday Kings Royal; on the Friday of race week an additional event, "The Knight Before the Kings Royal", is held.

The event lost its annual status after the 2020 event was canceled because of the global pandemic. In 2021, the Kings Royal was run as a double feature. The night before the Thursday feature was the Joker's Wild event. The Thursday event was the first feature (new ticket). The Friday event was the Knight Before event. The Saturday event was the second feature. Because of weather issues, the two features were run on the same Saturday, with the Thursday feature running in the afternoon and the Saturday feature running in the evening. The Knight Before was run on Sunday. The 2021 event saw the start of a nine-year sanctioning agreement with World Racing Group, promoters of the World of Outlaws Sprint Car Series. For 2022, the event retained its four-day format.

==== High Limit addition ====
In October 2023, Kyle Larson and brother-in-law Brad Sweet acquired the Tezos All Star Circuit of Champions tour from Eldora owner Tony Stewart, and the Kings Royal became a two-day format (Friday and Saturday) only as part of the World Racing Group deal, as Larson and Sweet's High Limit Racing featured a two-day midweek show before the official Kings Royal shows (Knight Before on Friday and Kings Royal on Saturday) starting in 2024. The High Limit format is similar to a multiple day format where each night's performance determines the starting field for the championship night. The Wednesday night Double Down Duels drivers are split into two groups and race only in the groups they are drawn, where a driver's qualifying time, heat race performance, and feature results are converted into points. The Thursday Joker's Jackpot feature has the top 12 drivers in points advance to the A Main on Thursday for the $100,000 to win feature, with positions 13-36 in one of two B Mains, and the rest of the field in one of two C Mains. From 2025–2026, the Joker's Jackpot was televised on Fox Sports 1.

==== Current format ====
The Kings Royal and Knight Before remain World Racing Group events, and each night has its own qualifying and own race, with the Kings Royal currently employing a format where the top two drivers in qualifying guaranteed to start in the A Main, and drivers notoriously sandbagging for the right to qualify in a position that is a power of six, since the winner of that heat race will win the pole position. Drivers must score a podium finish in order to advance to the A Main or they are relegated to the B Main.

== Tradition ==
The event is considered to be one of the most prestigious sprint car events held worldwide, and is considered to be a "Crown Jewel" event.

The winner gets seated on a throne in victory lane while adorned with a crown and robe and carrying a scepter.

=== Purse ===
From its inaugural running through 2018, there was a standard $50,000 winner's purse; the 2019 running saw a boost to $175,000 for the winner's prize. The Kings Royal is Eldora's largest event each season, drawing over 30,000 spectators. Since 2025, the winner's purse was upgraded to $200,000.

== Winners ==
Steve Kinser leads all drivers with seven Kings Royal victories. No driver won back-to-back Kings Royals for the first 33 years of the event, until Donny Schatz did so in 2017; in 2018 Schatz won again to become the first driver to win three Kings Royals in a row. Anthony Macri did so in 2025; in 2026 Macri won again to become the second driver to win back to back Kings Royals and first since Schatz.

Year	Driver	Car no.	Owner	Ref
1984	Steve Kinser	11	Karl Kinser	
1985	Doug Wolfgang	29	Bob Weikert	
1986	Don Kreitz Jr.	69	Don Kreitz, Jr.	
1987	Jac Haudenschild	40	Gary Stanton	
1988	Steve Kinser	11	Karl Kinser	
1989	Bobby Davis Jr.	10	Casey Luna	
1990	Doug Wolfgang	8	Williams Bros.	
1991	Steve Kinser	11	Karl Kinser	
1992	Sammy Swindell	1	Sammy Swindell	
1993	Dave Blaney	10	Casey Luna	
1994	Jac Haudenschild	22	Jack Elden	
1995	Dave Blaney	10	Casey Luna	
1996	Johnny Herrera	47	Gil Sonner	
1997	Steve Kinser	11	Steve Kinser	
1998	Jac Haudenschild	22	Jack Elden	
1999	Sammy Swindell	1	Sammy Swindell	
2000	Dale Blaney	93	Dave Blaney	
2001	Mark Kinser	5m	Karl Kinser	
2002	Joey Saldana	17	Joe Saldana	
2003	Steve Kinser	11	Steve Kinser	
2004	Jason Sides	7s	Sides Motorsports	
2005	Steve Kinser	11	Steve Kinser	
2006	Joey Saldana	9	Kasey Kahne Racing	
2007	Donny Schatz	15	Schatz Motorsports	
2008	Daryn Pittman	21	Titan Racing	
2009	Donny Schatz	15	Tony Stewart Racing	
2010	Steve Kinser	11	Tony Stewart Racing	
2011	Tyler Walker	17	Jesse Keen	
2012	Sammy Swindell	1	Big Game Motorsports	
2013	Brad Sweet	49	Kasey Kahne Racing	
2014	Kerry Madsen	29	Keneric Racing	
2015	Shane Stewart	2	Larson Marks Racing	
2016	Donny Schatz	15	Tony Stewart Racing	
2017	Donny Schatz	15	Tony Stewart Racing	
2018	Donny Schatz	15	Tony Stewart Racing	
2019	Brad Sweet	49	Kasey Kahne Racing	
2021	Tyler Courtney Afternoon	7BC	Clauson-Marshall Racing	
2021	Kyle Larson Night	57	Silva Racing	
2022	Brent Marks	19	Murray-Marks Motorsports	
2023	Donny Schatz	15	Tony Stewart Racing	
2024	David Gravel	2	Big Game Motorsports	
2025	Anthony Macri	39M	Macri Motorsports	
2026	Anthony Macri	39M	Macri Motorsports	
