= Shane Stewart =

American racing driver

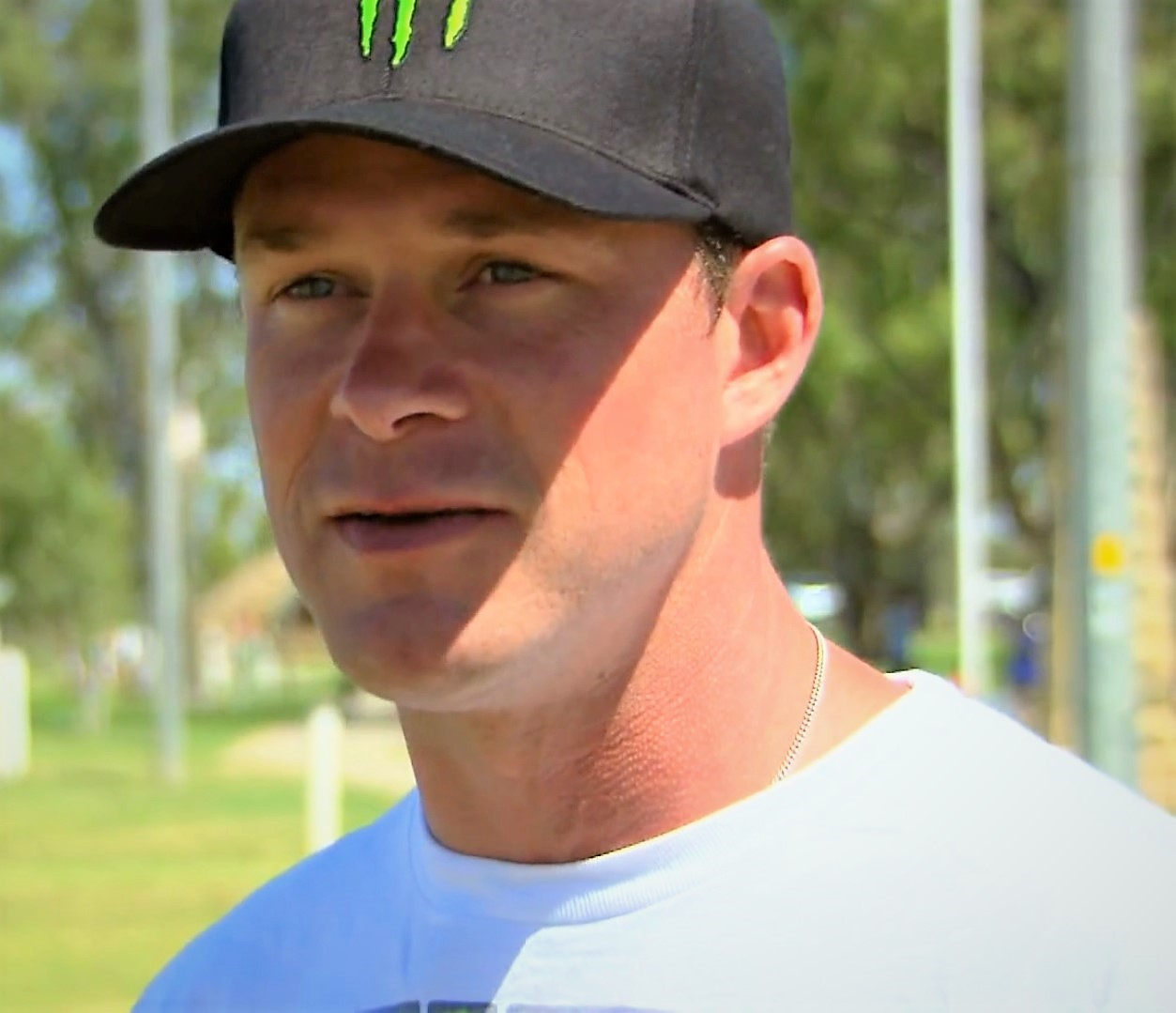
- Stewart interviewed in 2013
- Born: May 24, 1976 (age 50) Bixby, Oklahoma, US
- Retired: 2020

World of Outlaws Sprint Car Series
- Years active: 1995–2020
- Starts: 790
- Wins: 36
- Best finish: 2nd in 2015

Championship titles
- 2009; 2011: Lucas Oil ASCS Sprint Car Dirt Series

Awards
- 2009; 2011: 360 Sprint Car Driver of the Year

Shane Stewart (born May 24, 1976) is an American retired professional racing driver. Winner of the 2015 Kings Royal, he last competed in the World of Outlaws Sprint Car Series and the All Star Series of Champions.

== Racing career ==
A native of Bixby, Oklahoma, Stewart began racing quarter midgets at the age of seven; he began racing sprint cars at the age of 16, tutored by Andy Hillenburg. He began competing in the World of Outlaws Sprint Car Series in 1995; he went full-time in the series in 2005, winning the series' Rookie of the Year title. He ran the full season again in 2008 for Roth Motorsports. Stewart also competed in 360ci sprint car competition; in 2007 he was champion of the Northwest Sprint Challenge Speedweek, and he ran several seasons in the American Sprint Car Series, winning the ASCS national touring title in 2009, and then again in 2011 by a single point over Johnny Herrera. He won the Knoxville 360 Nationals five times; won the Canadian Sprint Car Nationals three times, tied for the most wins in the event with Steve Poirier. Stewart was named 360 Sprint Car Driver of the Year in 2009, and again in 2011, by the National Sprint Car Hall of Fame & Museum.

Stewart joined the newly-formed Larson Marks Racing, later known as Kyle Larson Racing, for the 2014 season. He drove for the team through the end of 2018, winning 35 feature events over multiple series, including the 2015 Kings Royal at Eldora Speedway, one of sprint car racing's most prestigious events. His best World of Outlaws points finish came that year, when he finished second in the standings to Donny Schatz. In 2016, he won the off-season Winter Heat Sprint Car Showdown championship at Cocopah Speedway.

Stewart joined CJB Motorsports for the 2019 World of Outlaws season, replacing David Gravel; he won the series's special event at Nashville's Fairgrounds Speedway, but left the team at the end of the year due to a lack of chemistry.

Stewart considered retiring following the 2019 season, having spent two seasons with growing frustration over a lack of stability and performance. Choosing to return to competition instead, he signed to run ten races with Roth Motorsports; after these events were cancelled due to the COVID-19 pandemic, Stewart ran the majority of the 2020 World of Outlaws season with the No. 71 team owned by Bernie Stuebgen. He won for the team at Williams Grove Speedway in the track's prestigious Summer Nationals, and then at Lakeside Speedway in October, in the first of two races in which he was substituting for David Gravel, who was competing in NASCAR Gander Outdoors Truck Series events, for Jason Johnson Racing.

At the end of the 2020 season, Stewart announced his retirement from active competition, purchasing his home track, Port City Raceway, to promote races there.
