= Johnny Herrera =

Johnny Herrera may refer to:

- Johnny Herrera (footballer) (born 1981), Chilean goalkeeper
- Johnny Herrera (racing driver) (born 1966), American racing driver
