= Kyle Larson Racing =

American auto racing team

- Founded: November 2013
- Base: Mooresville, North Carolina
- Team principal(s): Kyle Larson; Justin Marks; Paul Silva
- Former series: World of Outlaws Sprint Car Series; All Star Circuit of Champions
- Noted drivers: Shane Stewart; Carson Macedo
- Drivers' Championships: 1 (2016 Winter Heat Sprint Car Showdown)

Kyle Larson Racing, originally Larson Marks Racing, is an American sprint car and midget car racing team owned by NASCAR driver Kyle Larson. Fielding cars for Shane Stewart and later Carson Macedo, the team won over 40 sprint car races across multiple series between 2014 and 2020; Larson himself has won multiple crown jewel midget races driving for the team.

== History ==
=== Sprint cars ===
In November 2013 the formation of Larson Marks Racing, co-owned by Kyle Larson and Justin Marks, was announced; the team hired Shane Stewart to drive it's No. 2 sprint car, primarily in the World of Outlaws Sprint Car Series, for a partial season in 2014 with a move to full-time WoO competition in 2015. Stewart won at Eldora Speedway in the team's second-ever start. In 2015, Stewart won the prestigious Kings Royal at Eldora with the team; he went on to finish second in the World of Outlaws points standings, and during the 2015–2016 offseason was champion of the Winter Heat Sprint Car Showdown at Cocopah Speedway.

After the 2017 season, Larson took full ownership of the team, renaming it Kyle Larson Racing and hiring Paul Silva as general manager. After the 2018 season, Stewart departed to join CJB Motorsports, having won 35 times during his time driving for KLR. rookie Carson Macedo was hired as his replacement, and would win the World of Outlaws Rookie of the Year title at the end of the 2019 season, winning five races overall during his two seasons with the team.

In October 2020, it was announced that Kyle Larson Racing's sprint car team would be closing operations at the end of the 2020 racing season; Larson cited difficulties from the COVID-19 pandemic as one reason for the closure.

=== Midget cars ===
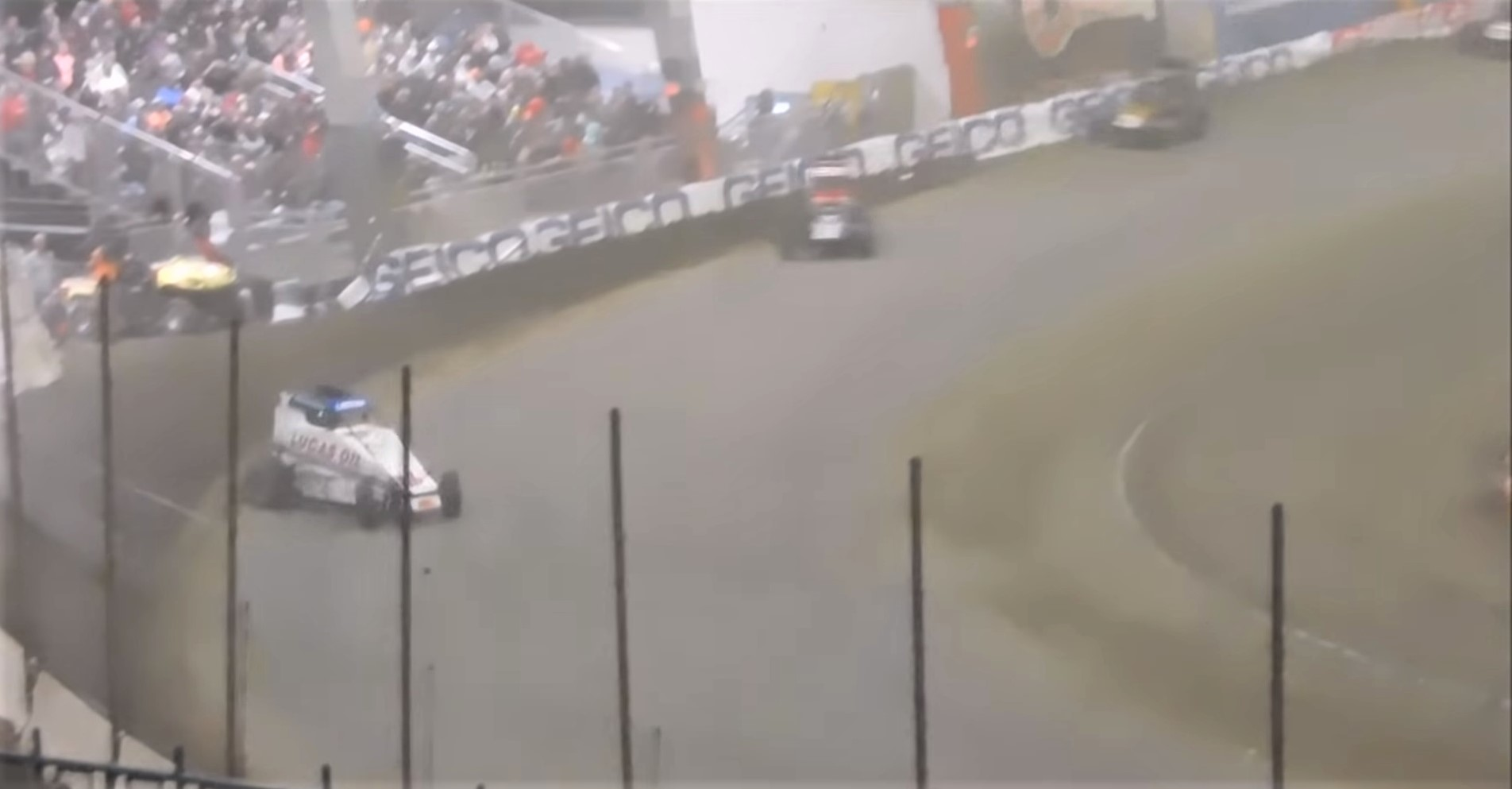
Kyle Larson leading at the 2020 Chili Bowl Nationals

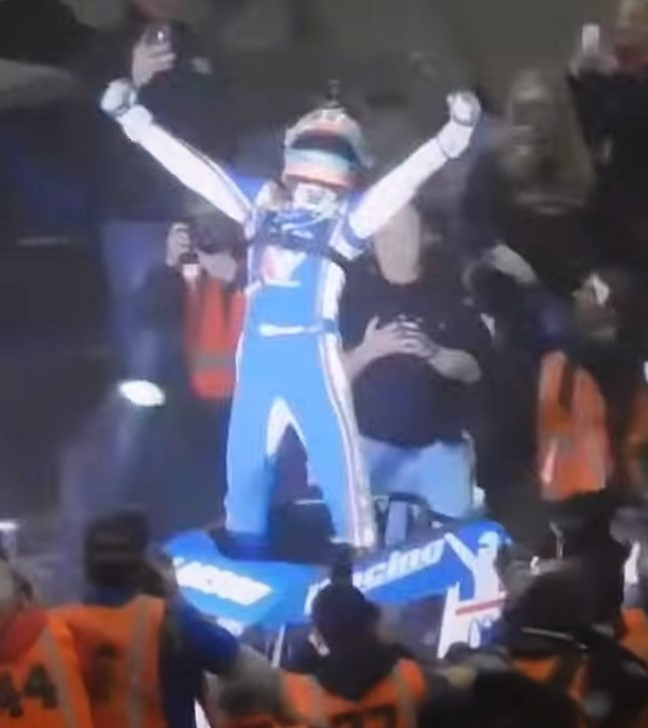
Kyle Larson after winning the 2020 Chili Bowl Nationals

In addition to its sprint car team, KLR fielded a No. 1K midget car for Larson to drive in selected events. The team began running in the summer of 2019, and planned to run an "off-season" schedule of prestigious races that winter, including the Turkey Night Grand Prix and Chili Bowl Nationals. Larson won the Turkey Night Grand Prix for his fifth win in six starts with the team, and after reaching the feature of the Chili Bowl Nationals eight times in twelve attempts without a victory, Larson won the event in 2020, his first year running for his own team. Returning in 2021 with his own team once again, Larson won again in 2021, scoring back to back victories in the prestigious race.
