= Johnny Herrera (racing driver) =

American racing driver

Johnny P. Herrera (born September 11, 1966 in Denver, Colorado) is an American racecar driver. He is best known for racing in the World of Outlaws (WoO) sprint car racing series. He was the series' Rookie of the Year in 1986. As of the end of the 2009 season, he has won 17 features in the series.

== Racing career ==
Herrera began his sprint car racing career in Albuquerque, New Mexico. In 1986, he was named World of Outlaws Rookie of the Year. He won the WoO "Most Improved Driver" award in 1991.

In 1995, Harrera won the sprint car track championship at Knoxville Raceway. Herrera won the 1996 King's Royal sprint car race with a collapsed top wing. He earned the $50,000 winner's purse by leading all 30 laps.

In 2002 and 2003, Herrera joined drove the 2W for former NASCAR crew chief Billy Wilburn, and won the first night out in the car during a preliminary World of Outlaws race the Dirt Track at Las Vegas Motor Speedway.

Herrera has recently raced in non-winged racecars in the United States, and he has won the Roger McCluskey Classic at Tucson's USA Raceway.

Herrera was the points champion in 2007 in both SCOA (a winged sprint car series based in Arizona) and Hollywood Hills Speedway Non winged class.

Herrera raced for Larry and Lori Woodward in 2009 at Knoxville in the 410 Sprint class.

== Awards ==
In 1988, Herrera was awarded the New Mexico Governor's Award, which is given to the athlete who gives the most publicity and fame to the state of New Mexico. He won the 2009 Knoxville Track Championship in the 410 class.
