= Daryn Pittman =

American racing driver

- Born: August 29, 1978 (age 48) Owasso, Oklahoma, U.S.
- Retired: 2020

World of Outlaws Sprint Car Series
- Years active: 1996–2020
- Starts: 1454
- Wins: 86
- Best finish: 1st in 2013

Championship titles
- 2003 2010 2013 2013, 2015, 2019: World Series Sprintcars; Keystone Cup Sprint Car Series; World of Outlaws Sprint Car Series; DIRTcar Nationals

Daryn Pittman (born August 29, 1978) is an American semi-retired professional racing driver. Winner of the 2008 Kings Royal and 2013 champion of the World of Outlaws Sprint Car Series, he retired from full time competition following the 2020 season.

== Racing career ==
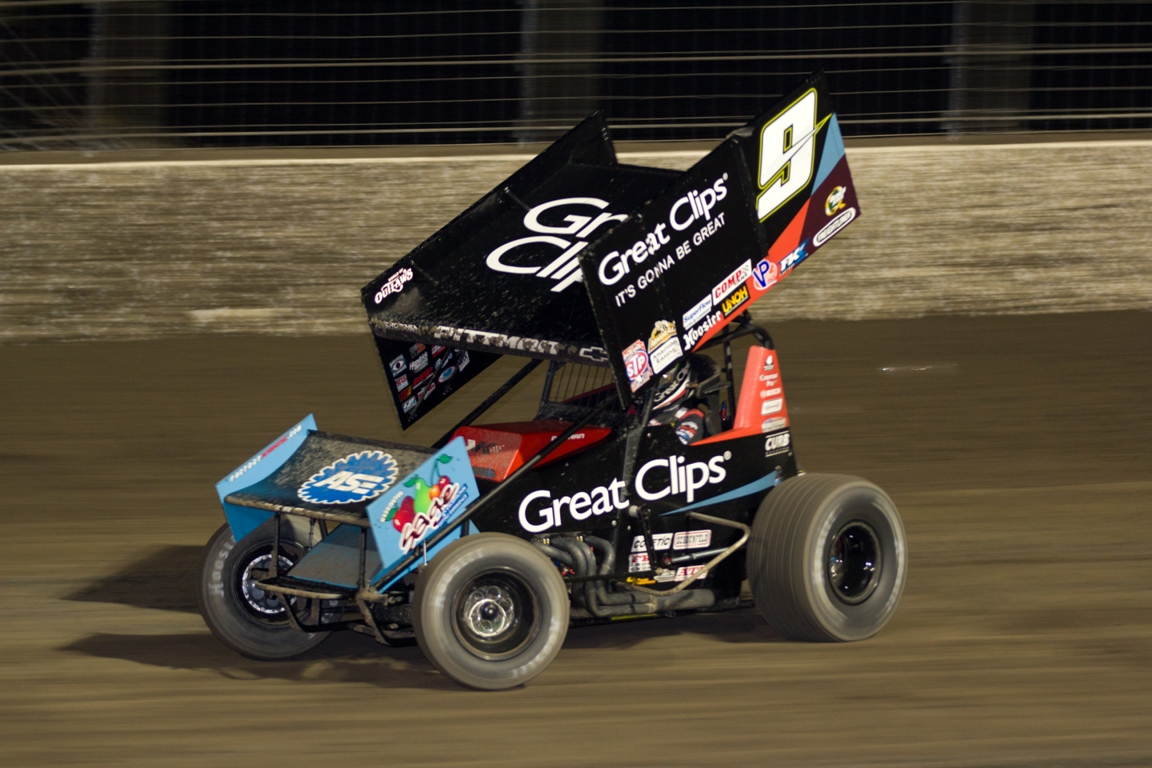
Pittman in 2013 at Dodge City Raceway Park

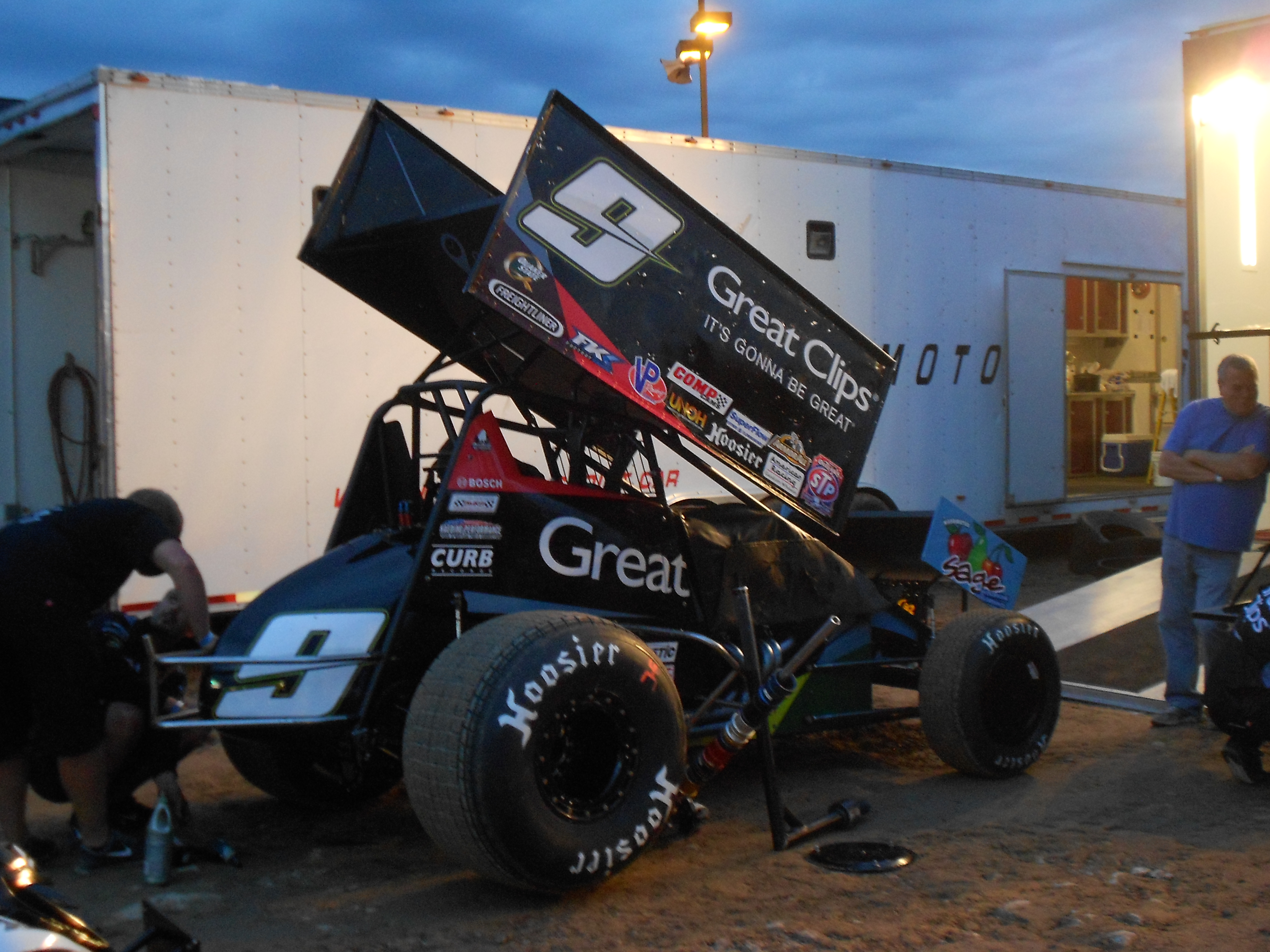
Pittman's 2013 car at Beaver Dam Raceway

Pittman started his sprint car career in 1996. He raced in the American Sprint Car Series before moving to full-time competition in the World of Outlaws Sprint Car Series starting in 1999. After two years in the series, Pittman made a late decision to pursue the World of Outlaws Gumout Racing Series championship in 2001, after a poor start on the national tour; he wound up winning the support series' season title.

Racing in Australia during the winter of 2002–2003, Pittman won the World Series Sprintcars championship, becoming the only American to do so; he was also named that season's Australian Sprint Poll Driver of the Year. 2006 saw Pittman win his first Gold Cup at Silver Dollar Speedway.

Driving for Titan Racing USA, Pittman won the 2008 Kings Royal at Eldora Speedway, beating Jason Meyers and Chad Kemenah to capture the prestigious event.

In 2009, Pittman dropped off the WoO national tour and spent the next four years racing in regional series in Pennsylvania. He won the 2010 Keystone Cup Sprint Car Series championship, and in 2012 claimed the All Star Circuit of Champions Eastern Region title, racing for Heffner Motorsports.

After four years competing in local series in Pennsylvania, Pittman joined Kasey Kahne Racing for the 2013 season. The 2013 season started with Pittman winning the overall championship in the DIRTcar Nationals miniseries at Volusia Speedway Park. Pittman clinched the 2013 World of Outlaws STP Sprint Car Series championship, scoring eight series wins over the course of the season, beating Donny Schatz by 14 points for the title. He was the first driver from Oklahoma to win the World of Outlaws championship. 2014 saw Pittman winning his third Speed Sport World Challenge at Knoxville Raceway; he had captured the $10,000-to-win event previously in 2004 and 2005. Pittman started the 2015 season by winning his second DIRTcar Nationals championship. It was rumored that Pittman would leave KKR following the 2015 season, but he returned for 2016.

Pittman left KKR after 2018, starting the 2019 season with Roth Motorsports. He started the year by claiming the overall sprint car championship at Volusia Speedway Park's DIRTcar Nationals, his third title in the miniseries. He won four times on the World of Outlaws tour on his way to a fourth-place points finish; he also won his second Gold Cup at Silver Dollar Speedway, and became the first four-time winner of Oskaloosa Speedway's Front Row Challenge for 360 sprint cars.

Pittman returned to Roth Motorsports for the 2020 racing season; in July, he won the World of Outlaws' Elimination Showdown special event at Cedar Lake Speedway. Following races at Knoxville Raceway in August, Pittman tested positive for COVID-19; he missed two events before returning to the series. In September, Pittman announced he would step away from full-time competition after the 2020 season. Shortly afterwards, he announced he was departing Roth Racing as of mid-September; he won one final time with the team, at Lawton Speedway, before rejoining Heffner Motorsports to complete his final season. Pittman retired having scored 86 World of Outlaws feature wins.

== Personal life ==
Born in Owasso, Oklahoma, Pittman resides in Flint, Texas. He is married and has two children and owns and operates Ultra Shield Race Products in Flint, Texas.
