= Kraig Kinser =

American racing driver

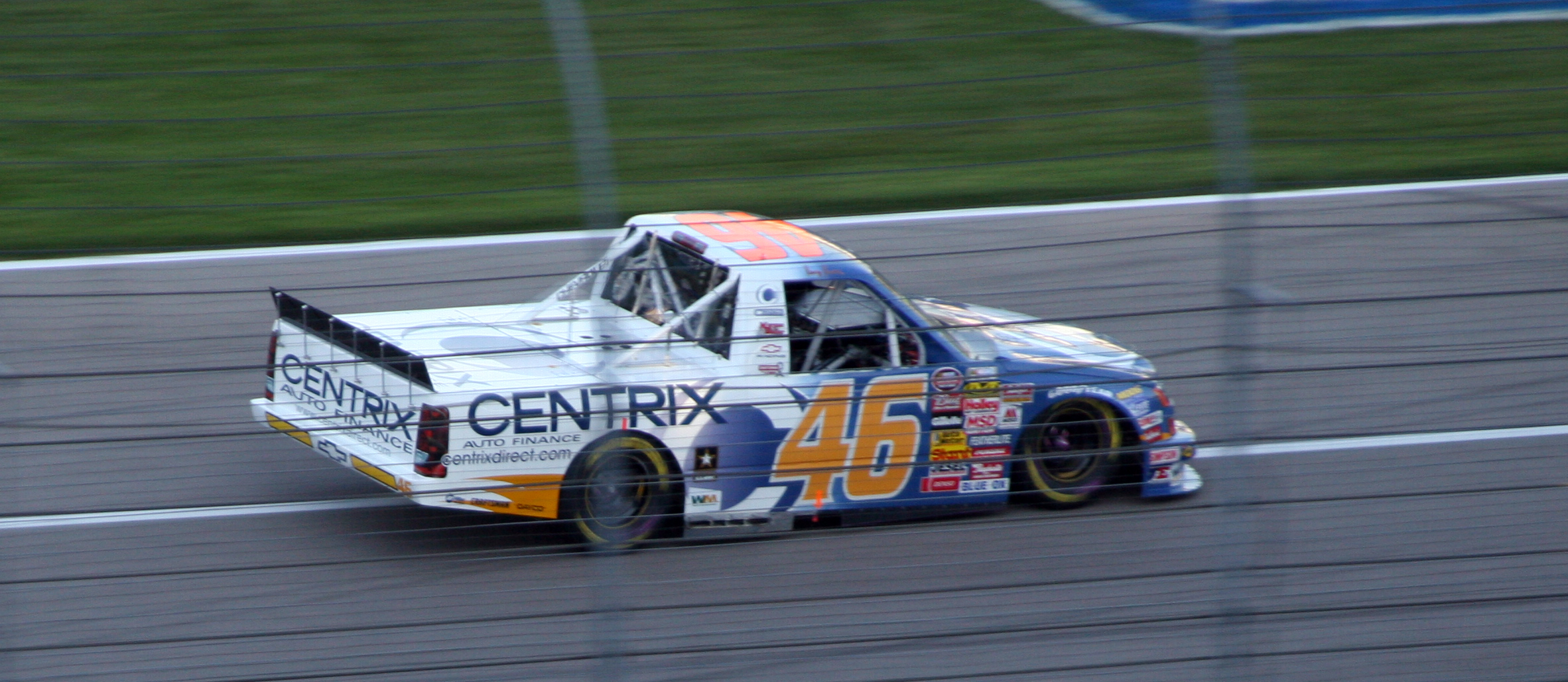
- Kinser's truck in 2006
- Born: October 8, 1984 (age 42); Bloomington, Indiana, U.S.
- Awards: 2004 World of Outlaws Rookie of the Year; 2005 Knoxville Nationals Champion

NASCAR FedEx Freight Truck Series career
- 31 races run over 2 years
- Best finish: 29th (2006)
- First race: 2006 GM Flex Fuel 250 (Daytona)
- Last race: 2007 Built Ford Tough 225 Presented by Greater Cincinnati Ford Dealers (Kentucky)
Wins	Top tens	Poles
0	1	0
- Statistics up to date as of April 2, 2020.

Kraig Kinser (born October 8, 1984) is an American professional racing driver. He was previously a developmental driver for MB2 Motorsports/Ginn Racing, and while with them, competed in both the NASCAR Craftsman Truck Series and the ARCA Re/Max Series between 2005 and 2007.

Kinser is the son of the champion World of Outlaws sprint car racer Steve Kinser, as well as the fourth cousin of WoO competitor Mark Kinser.

== Racing career ==
In 2005, Kinser won the Knoxville Nationals, the most prestigious sprint car race in the world. The same year, he made his ARCA debut with Fast Track Racing in a partnership with MB2 Motorsports (the team he was a developmental driver for), and in just his second career start (which came at Talladega Superspeedway), he won a race.

In 2006, Kinser started the season running full-time for Rookie of the Year in the Craftsman Truck Series, driving the No. 47 Chevrolet Silverado for Morgan-Dollar Motorsports. However, two races into the season, that truck changed numbers for the following two races to the No. 29, where Morgan-Dollar used K Automotive Racing's owner points to make the field. For the rest of the year after that, Kinser's truck used the No. 46. He was pulled from the ride in some races towards the end of the season, and now was sharing it with three Chevy Cup Series drivers: Clint Bowyer, Joe Nemechek, and Denny Hamlin. Also during that year, MB2 became Ginn Racing after a change in ownership. Kinser also returned to ARCA again for one race at Iowa, driving a No. 36 car for Ginn, where he would go on to finish second in that race.

Kinser returned to the Truck Series in 2007, driving the No. 47 for Morgan-Dollar. He was originally slated to share this truck with fellow Ginn developmental driver Jesus Hernandez, but this never happened after Ginn merged with Dale Earnhardt Inc. mid-season, and Kinser was replaced by Regan Smith, meaning he did not complete the season for the second straight year.

In 2008, Kinser was back running Sprint cars for Tony Stewart's prestigious team. He raced with them until the end of the 2009 World of Outlaws season. In 2010, he drove for his dad Steve Kinser's team with Quaker State sponsorship under the number 11K. For 2011, he drove the Casey's General Store Maxim for the Parsons Motorsports team.

As of July 6, 2017, Kinser has 17 World of Outlaw feature wins, placing him 24th all-time.

== Motorsports career results ==
=== NASCAR ===
(key) (Bold – Pole position awarded by qualifying time. Italics – Pole position earned by points standings or practice time. * – Most laps led.)

==== Busch Series ====
NASCAR Busch Series results
Year	Team	No.	Make	1	2	3	4	5	6	7	8	9	10	11	12	13	14	15	16	17	18	19	20	21	22	23	24	25	26	27	28	29	30	31	32	33	34	35	NBSC	Pts	Ref
2006	McGill Motorsports	04	Chevy	DAY	CAL	MXC	LVS	ATL	BRI	TEX	NSH	PHO	TAL	RCH	DAR	CLT	DOV	NSH	KEN	MLW	DAY	CHI	NHA	MAR	GTY	IRP	GLN	MCH	BRI	CAL	RCH	DOV	KAN	CLT	MEM	TEX	PHO	HOM; DNQ	N/A	0	

==== Craftsman Truck Series ====
NASCAR Craftsman Truck Series results
Year	Team	No.	Make	1	2	3	4	5	6	7	8	9	10	11	12	13	14	15	16	17	18	19	20	21	22	23	24	25	NTSC	Pts	Ref
2006	Morgan-Dollar Motorsports	47	Chevy	DAY; 30	CAL; DNQ																								29th	1541	
2006	Morgan-Dollar Motorsports	29	Chevy			ATL; 28	MAR; 29																						29th	1541	
2006	Morgan-Dollar Motorsports	46	Chevy					GTY; 17	CLT; 19	MFD; 35	DOV; 31	TEX; 36	MCH; 22	MLW; 28	KAN; 35	KEN; 35	MEM; 27	IRP; 13	NSH; 23	BRI; 24	NHA	LVS; 9	TAL	MAR	ATL	TEX	PHO; 24	HOM	29th	1541	
2007	Morgan-Dollar Motorsports	47	Chevy	DAY; 30	CAL; 17	ATL; 29	MAR; 30	KAN; 24	CLT; 29	MFD; 33	DOV; 31	TEX; 15	MCH; 14	MLW; 17	MEM; 14	KEN; 28	IRP	NSH	BRI	GTW	NHA	LVS	TAL	MAR	ATL	TEX	PHO	HOM	31st	1186	

=== ARCA Re/Max Series ===
(key) (Bold – Pole position awarded by qualifying time. Italics – Pole position earned by points standings or practice time. * – Most laps led.)

ARCA Re/Max Series results
Year	Team	No.	Make	1	2	3	4	5	6	7	8	9	10	11	12	13	14	15	16	17	18	19	20	21	22	23	ARSC	Pts	Ref
2005	Fast Track Racing with MB2 Motorsports	10	Chevy	DAY	NSH	SLM	KEN	TOL	LAN	MIL	POC	MCH	KAN	KEN	BLN	POC	GTW	LER	NSH	MCH; 8	ISF	TOL	DSF	CHI	SLM	**TAL**; 1*	68th	450	
2006	Ginn Racing	36	Chevy	DAY	NSH	SLM	WIN	KEN	TOL	POC	MCH	KAN	KEN	BLN	POC	GTW	NSH	MCH	ISF	MIL	TOL	DSF	CHI	SLM	TAL	IOW; 2	99th	225	
