= Donny Schatz =

World of Outlaws Sprint Car Driver

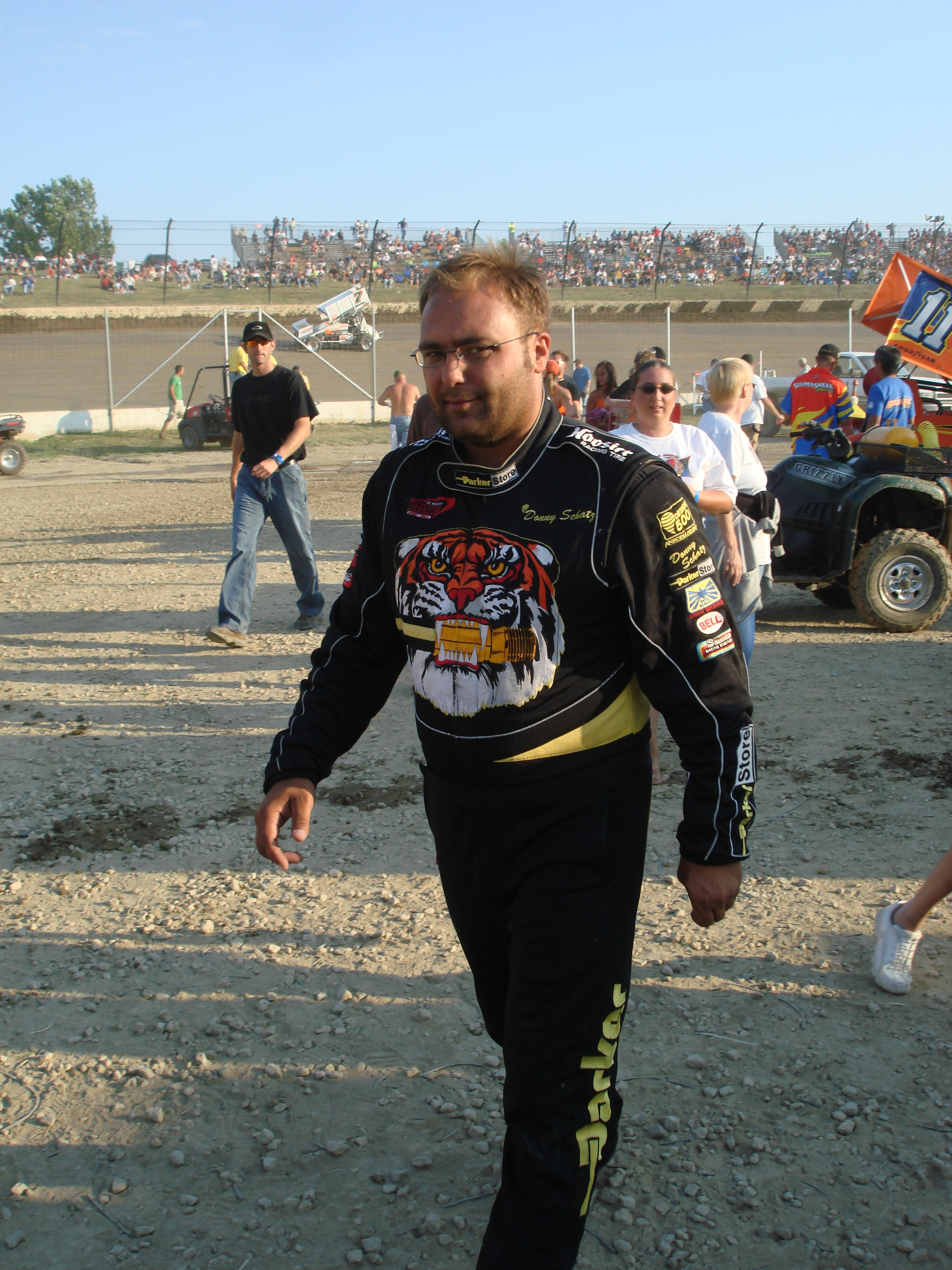
- Schatz at the 2007 Kings Royal
- Born: Donald R. Schatz; August 10, 1977 (age 49) Minot, North Dakota, U.S.

World of Outlaws career
- Debut season: 1997
- Championships: 10
- Wins: 315

Championship titles
- 2006–2009, 2012, 2014–2018: World of Outlaws Sprint Car Series

NASCAR FedEx Freight Truck Series career
- 1 race run over 1 year
- 2021 position: 84th
- Best finish: 84th (2021)
- First race: 2021 Corn Belt 150 (Knoxville)
Wins	Top tens	Poles
0	0	0
- Statistics up to date as of June 23, 2022.

Donald R. Schatz (born August 10, 1977) is an American professional sprint car racing driver who competes in the World of Outlaws, driving for Big Game Motorsports. Schatz is a ten-time champion in the World of Outlaws with a current total of 315 wins.

== Racing career ==
Schatz is son of Danny Christ Schatz, a sprint car driver in the 1970s, and Diane Korgel. He started his racing career at 11 in go karts, and moved to 358 sprint cars as a 15-year-old at Red River Valley Speedway. Schatz moved to 410 sprints and The World of Outlaws series three seasons later as an 18-year-old.

=== World of Outlaws ===
Schatz won the 1997 World of Outlaws Rookie of the Year award, and picked up his first A-feature win in 1998..

Schatz has gone on to win ten championships in 2006–2009, 2012, and 2014–2018. He became only the second driver to win the points championship four years in a row, with the other being Steve Kinser. Since 2006, he has recorded a top-two points finish, with three second places to go along with the ten championships.

As of June 19, 2021, Schatz has 300 WoO wins, third most all-time behind Steve Kinser and Sammy Swindell.

Prestigious wins include the Knoxville Nationals eleven times, (2006–09, 2011–15, 2017, 2022), the Kings Royal six times,(2007, 2009, 2016–18, 2023), the 2006, 2007, 2020 Don Martin Memorial Silver Cup; the Brad Doty Classic in 2013, 2016 and 2018; the 2000, 2004, 2005, 2007, 2012 and 2020 National Open at William's Grove Speedway, and the inaugural World of Outlaws World Finals at the Dirt Track at Charlotte Motor Speedway in 2008. He also holds the record for farthest in the field a winner of the Knoxville Nationals has started, when he won from the 21st starting position in 2013.

In 2008, Schatz moved to Tony Stewart Racing, and continued to drive for the team for eighteen years, until leaving the team on August 12, 2025.

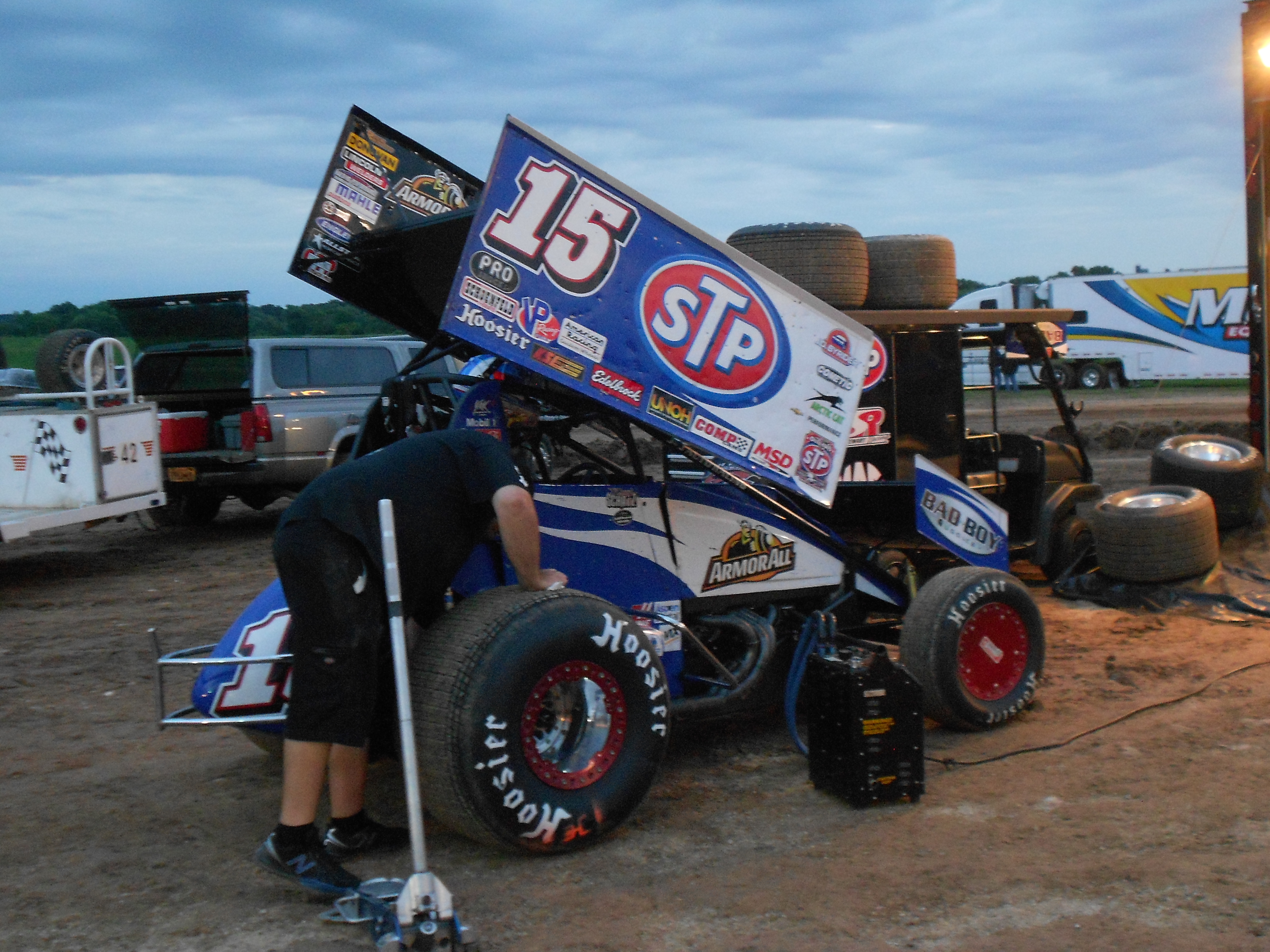
Donny's 2013 sprint car at Beaver Dam Raceway.

=== Australia ===
Schatz has spent time racing in Australia during his career. He won the Grand Annual Sprintcar Classic at the Premier Speedway in Warrnambool, Victoria back to back in 2001 & 2002. He was runner up in the 1999/2000 and 2001/02 World Series Sprintcars series.

=== NASCAR ===
On June 2, 2021, it was announced that Schatz would make his NASCAR and stock car racing debut in the inaugural Truck Series race at Knoxville Raceway, driving the No. 17 for David Gilliland Racing.

== Personal life ==
Schatz was a 1995 graduate of Minot High School. He currently lives in Fargo, North Dakota. He has a step-daughter, Savanna. Schatz is a licensed pilot and spends a great deal of time working with his parents in their family truck stop businesses in Fargo and Minot. He is an avid outdoorsman who enjoys hunting and snowmobiling.

== Motorsports career results ==
=== NASCAR ===
(key) (Bold – Pole position awarded by qualifying time. Italics – Pole position earned by points standings or practice time. * – Most laps led.)

==== Camping World Truck Series ====
NASCAR Camping World Truck Series results
Year	Team	No.	Make	1	2	3	4	5	6	7	8	9	10	11	12	13	14	15	16	17	18	19	20	21	22	NCWTC	Pts	Ref
2021	David Gilliland Racing	17	Ford	DAY	DAY	LVS	ATL	BRI	RCH	KAN	DAR	COA	CLT	TEX	NAS	POC	KNX; 32	GLN	GTW	DAR	BRI	LVS	TAL	MAR	PHO	84th	7	

Sporting positions
Preceded by Steve Kinser	World of Outlaws Champion; 2006-2009	Succeeded by Jason Meyers
Preceded by Jason Meyers	World of Outlaws Champion; 2012	Succeeded by Daryn Pittman
Preceded by Daryn Pittman	World of Outlaws Champion; 2014–2018	Succeeded by Brad Sweet
Achievements
Preceded by Joey Saldana	World of Outlaws Rookie of the Year; 1997	Succeeded by Dale Blaney
Preceded by Kraig Kinser; Tim Shaffer; Jason Johnson	Knoxville Nationals Winner; 2006–2009; 2011–2015; 2017	Succeeded by Tim Shaffer; Jason Johnson; Brad Sweet
Preceded by Joey Saldana; Daryn Pittman	Kings Royal Winner; 2007; 2009	Succeeded by Daryn Pittman; Steve Kinser
