= David Gravel =

American racing driver

- Born: June 23, 1992 (age 34); Watertown, Connecticut, U.S.
- Achievements: 2024, 2025 World of Outlaws NOS Energy Drink Sprint Car Series Champion; 2019 Knoxville Nationals Winner
- Awards: 2013 World of Outlaws Sprint Car Series Rookie of the Year

NASCAR FedEx Freight Truck Series career
- 2 races run over 1 year
- 2020 position: 50th
- Best finish: 50th (2020)
- First race: 2020 Henry Ford Health System 200 (Michigan)
- Last race: 2020 Clean Harbors 200 (Kansas)
Wins	Top tens	Poles
0	1	0

ARCA Menards Series career
- 1 race run over 1 year
- Best finish: 63rd (2020)
- First race: 2020 Lucas Oil 200 (Daytona)
Wins	Top tens	Poles
0	0	0

World of Outlaws NOS Energy Drink Sprint Car Series career
- Debut season: 2008
- Current team: No. 2 (Big Game Motorsports)
- Starts: 962
- Championships: 2 (2024, 2025)
- Wins: 120
- Poles: 156
- Best finish: 1st in 2024, 2025
- Finished last season: 1st (2025)
- Statistics up to date as of November 9, 2025.

David Gravel (born June 23, 1992) is an American professional racing driver. He competes full-time in the World of Outlaws NOS Energy Drink Sprint Car Series, driving the No. 2 Maxim for Big Game Motorsports. Gravel won the 2024 and 2025 World of Outlaws NOS Energy Drink Sprint Car Championship along with the Knoxville Nationals in 2019.

== Racing career ==
=== Early years ===
Growing up in Connecticut, Gravel started his racing career in quarter midgets before moving up to Legends cars on asphalt and then to dirt micro-sprints.

=== Dirt racing ===
In 2008, Gravel competed full-time with the United Racing Club and became the youngest winner in the history of the series. For the next four years, he raced in the All Star Circuit of Champions, scoring three top-three points finishes.

Gravel started making sporadic World of Outlaws appearances in 2008; he eventually won the series' Rookie of the Year award in 2013. He ran for Roth Motorsports in 2014, Destiny Motorsports in 2015 and from 2016 to 2018 drove for CJB Motorsports.

Gravel raced with Jason Johnson Racing in 2019, driving the team's No. 41 car to a third-place finish in the season-long point standings and winning the Knoxville Nationals and Jason Johnson Classic. He also participated in the 2019 Chili Bowl Midget Nationals, advancing to the A-main. After the season, he confirmed a return to JJR for another full-season effort in 2020, although that was eventually slimmed down to about 85 percent of the season's schedule after Gravel signed with NASCAR team GMS Racing for 2020.

After the COVID-19 pandemic temporarily stopped the WoO season, Gravel won the tour's first race back, held with no fans at Knoxville on May 8. He later won a premiere All Star Circuit of Champions race at Eldora Speedway. In his 600th WoO start, Gravel won at Williams Grove Speedway in the National Open preliminary. Gravel started his first USAC Silvercrown race on the dirt at the Springfield Mile; he started last and finished second behind Kyle Larson.

In 2024 and 2025, Gravel became the WoO Sprint Car Series Champion.

=== Pavement racing ===
On January 10, 2020, Gravel announced a six-race slate in the NASCAR Gander RV & Outdoors Truck Series, driving for GMS Racing. The announced schedule included the series' only dirt race, a July date at Eldora Speedway, but the plan ended up being foiled due to the COVID-19 pandemic canceling the Eldora race. As part of the deal, Gravel would also run the 2020 ARCA Menards Series season-opener at Daytona International Speedway with GMS affiliate team KBR Development.

== Motorsports career results ==
=== Gander RV & Outdoors Truck Series ===
NASCAR Gander RV & Outdoors Truck Series results
Year	Team	No.	Make	1	2	3	4	5	6	7	8	9	10	11	12	13	14	15	16	17	18	19	20	21	22	23	NGTC	Pts	Ref
2020	GMS Racing	24	Chevy	DAY	LVS	CLT	ATL	HOM	POC	KEN	TEX	KAN	KAN	MCH; 10	DAY	DOV	GTW	DAR	RCH	BRI	LVS	TAL	KAN; 35	TEX	MAR	PHO	50th	32	

=== ARCA Menards Series ===
(key) (Bold – Pole position awarded by qualifying time. Italics – Pole position earned by points standings or practice time. * – Most laps led.)

ARCA Menards Series results
Year	Team	No.	Make	1	2	3	4	5	6	7	8	9	10	11	12	13	14	15	16	17	18	19	20	AMSC	Pts	Ref
2020	KBR Development	28	Chevy	DAY; 12	PHO	TAL	POC	IRP	KEN	IOW	KAN	TOL	TOL	MCH	DAY	GTW	L44	TOL	BRI	WIN	MEM	ISF	KAN	63rd	32	
