= 2021 NASCAR Cup Series =

American motorsport season

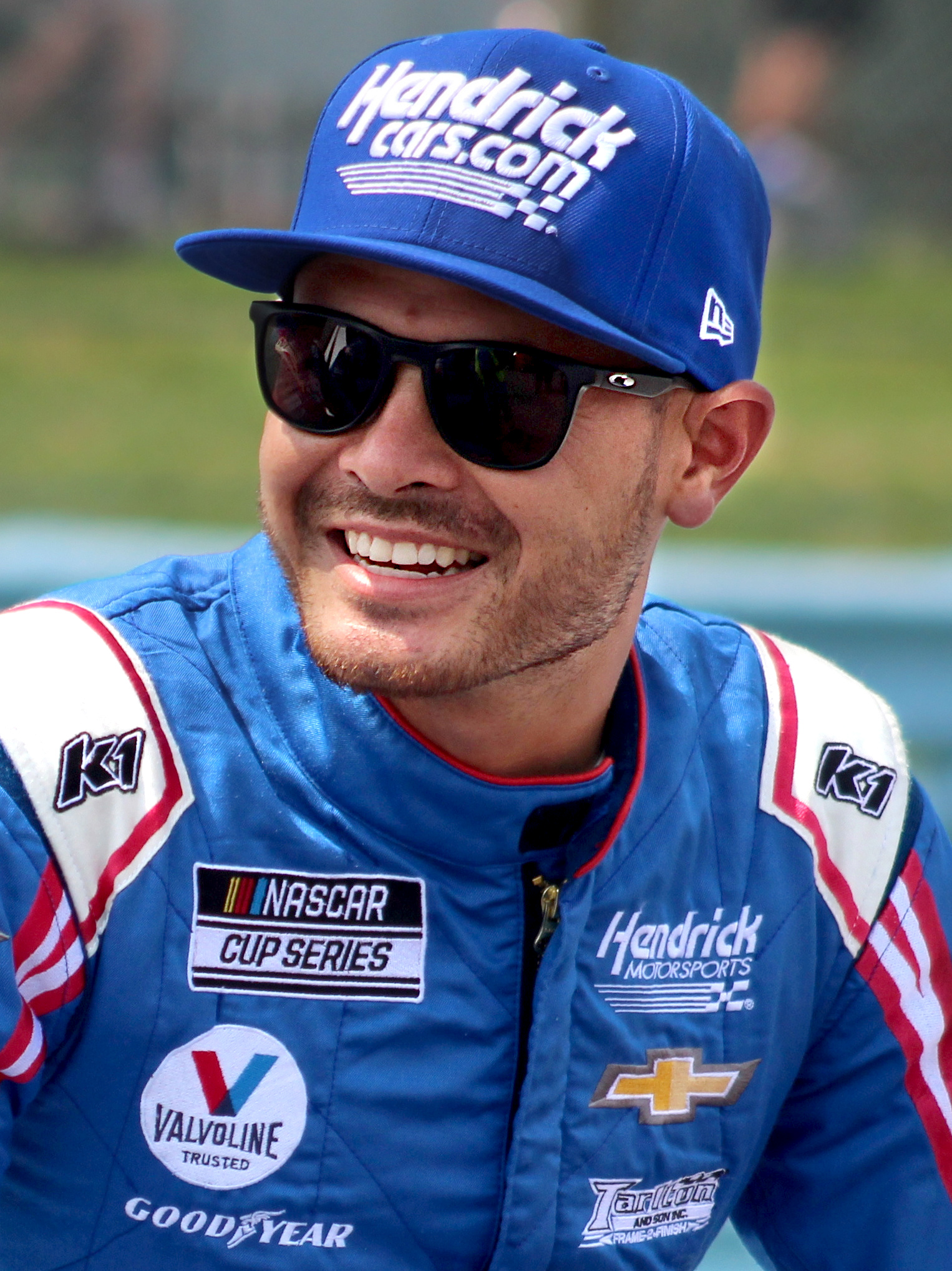
Kyle Larson, the 2021 NASCAR Cup Series champion and 2021 regular season champion.

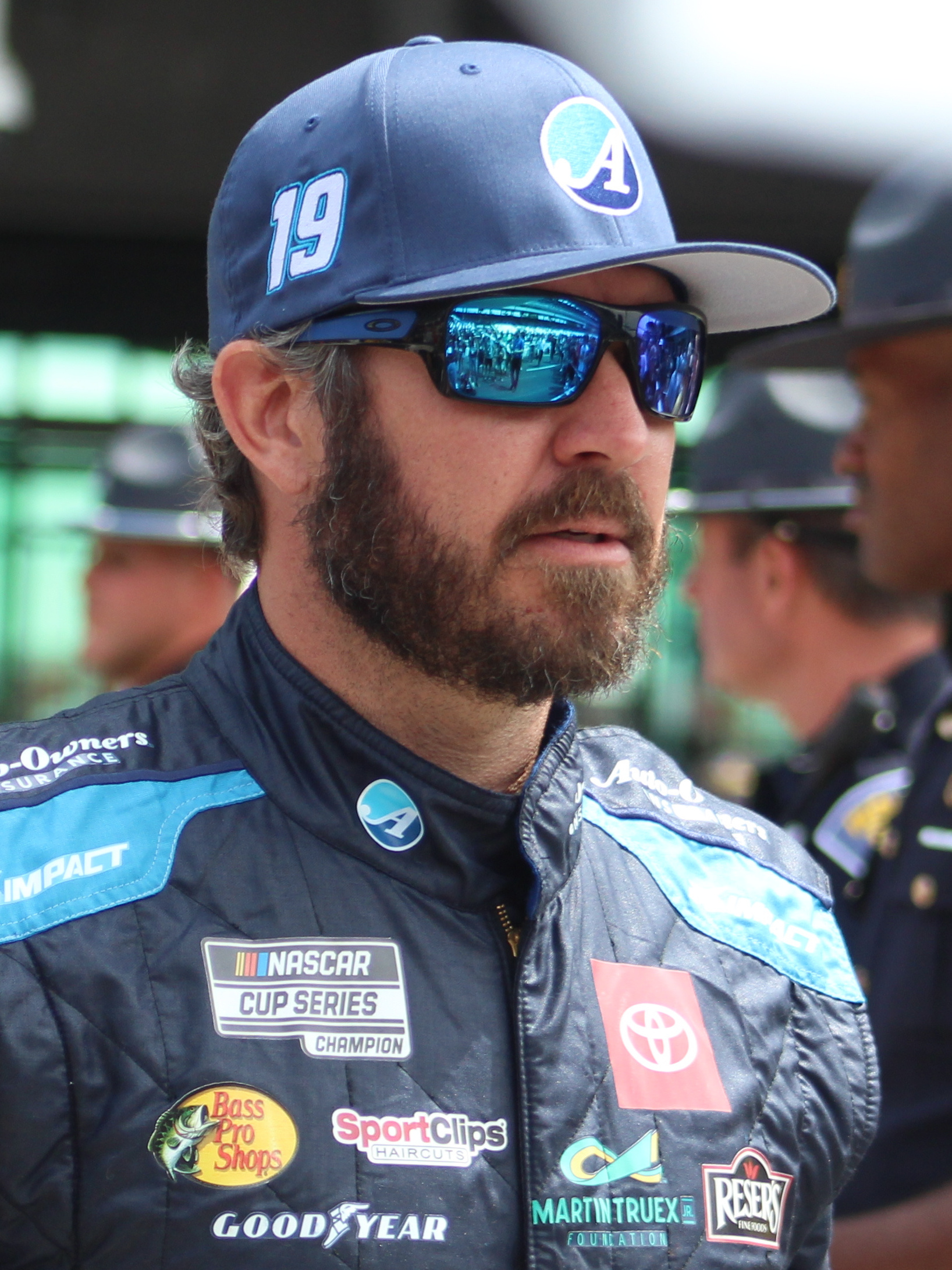
Martin Truex Jr., finished second behind Larson in the championship.

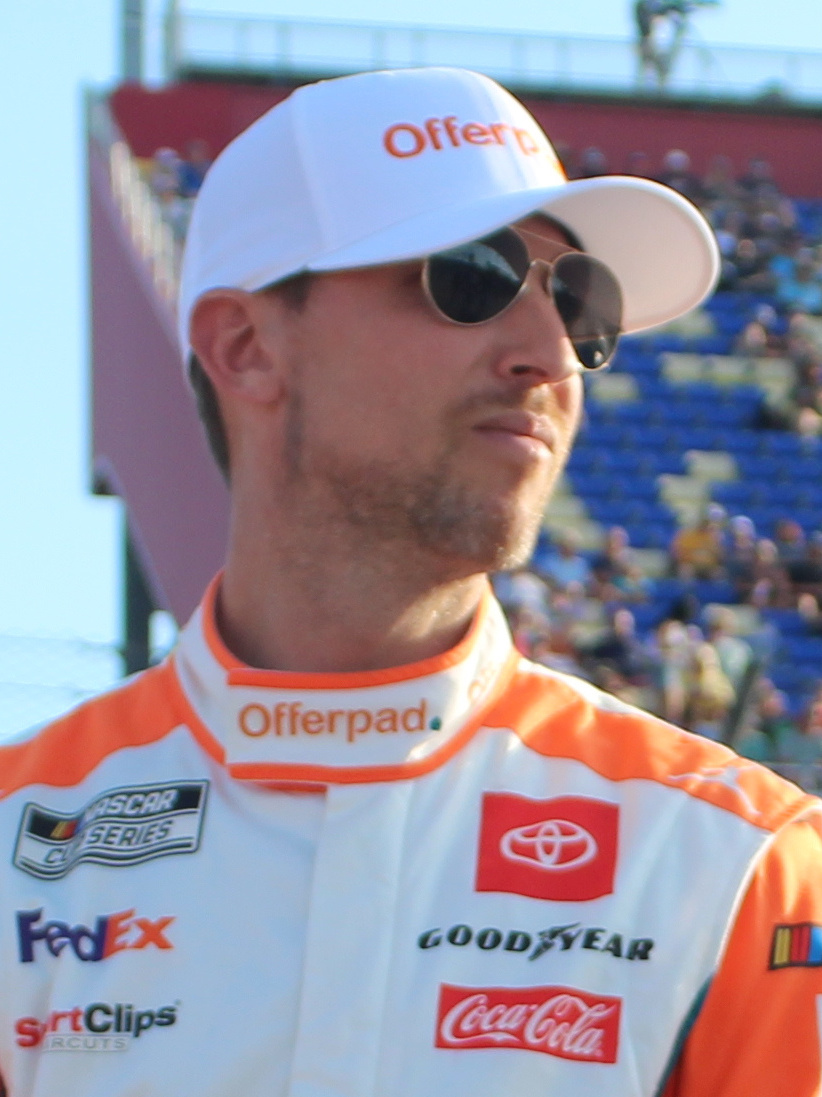
Denny Hamlin, finished third in the championship.

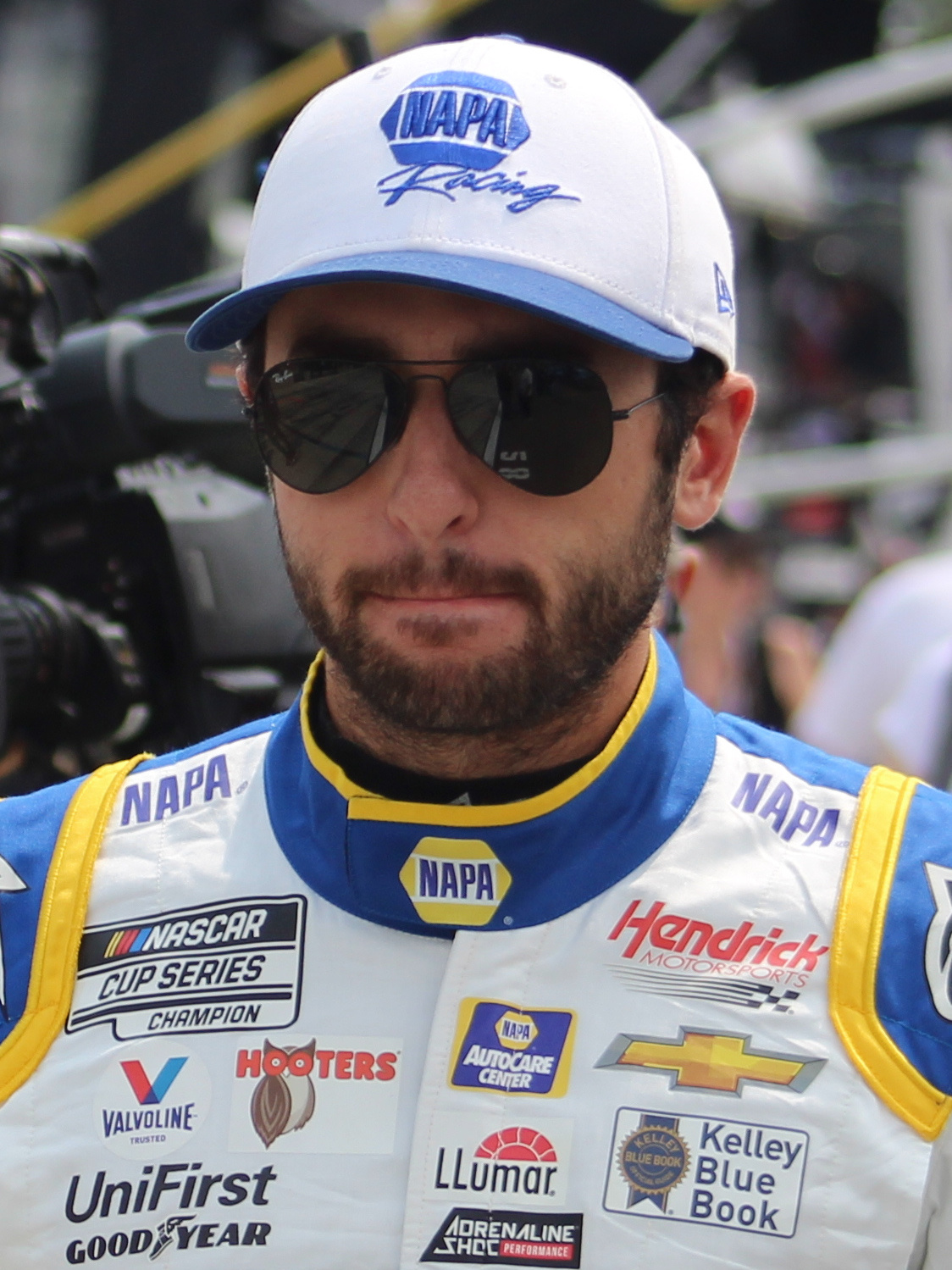
Chase Elliott, the defending champion, finished fourth in standings.

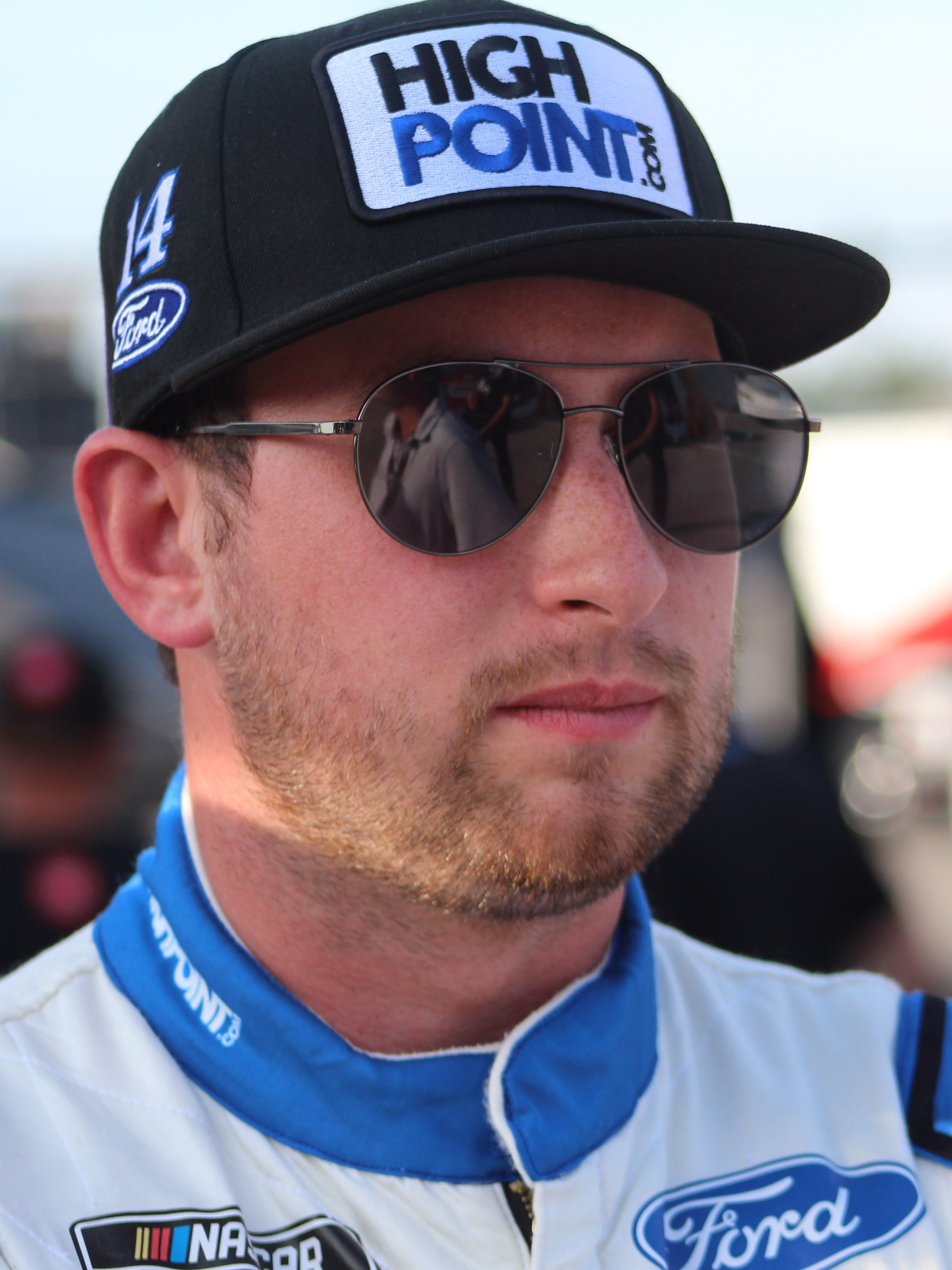
Chase Briscoe, the 2021 NASCAR Rookie of the Year.

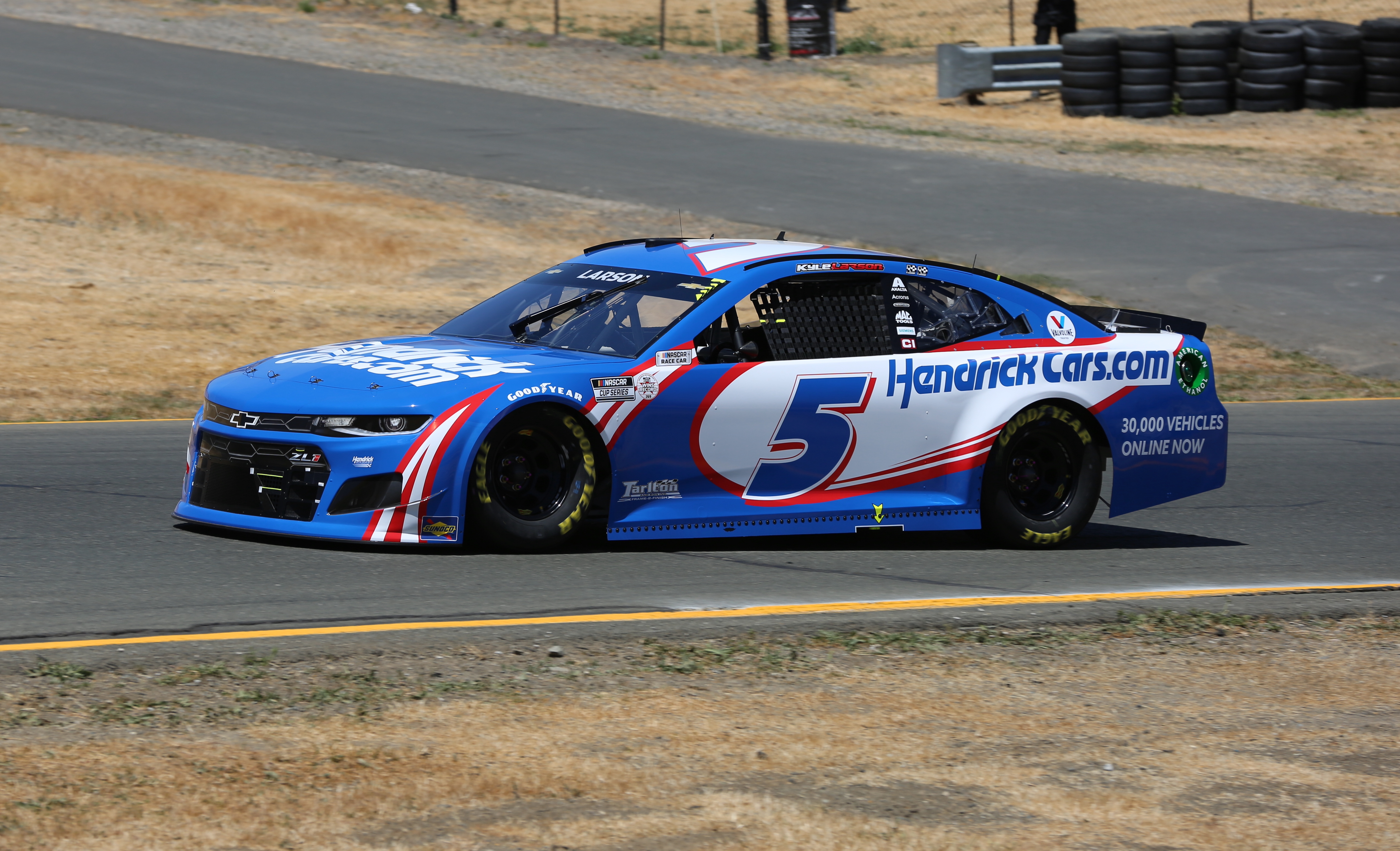
Chevrolet won the manufacturers' championship with 1336 points and 19 wins.

The 2021 NASCAR Cup Series was the 73rd season for NASCAR professional stock car racing in the United States and the 50th season for the modern era Cup Series. The season started at Daytona International Speedway with the Busch Clash, where it was the first year that the non–points event was run on the track's road course layout instead of the oval. That race was followed by the Bluegreen Vacations Duel qualifying races, and the 63rd running of the Daytona 500, the first points race of the season. The regular season also ended at Daytona with the 2021 Coke Zero Sugar 400 on August 28, where Kyle Larson won the Regular Season Championship. Following the 2021 Xfinity 500 at Martinsville Speedway on October 31, Chevrolet claimed its 40th Manufacturer's Championship and its first since 2015. The NASCAR playoffs ended with the NASCAR Cup Series Championship Race at Phoenix Raceway on November 7 with Larson earning his first Cup Series championship after a 10-win season.

The 2021 season represented a new era as several mainstays of the sport were absent. This was also the first season for 23XI Racing and Trackhouse Racing. It was also the last season for Chip Ganassi Racing, as Trackhouse purchased the entirety of CGR's NASCAR team for 2022, and the Cup Series Generation 6 car, which was replaced with the Next Gen car in 2022. In addition, this was the final season to have races covered by NBCSN, which shut down at the end of the year and had its coverage of NASCAR and all other sporting events taken over by USA Network.

== Teams and drivers ==
=== Chartered teams ===
Manufacturer	Team	No.	Driver	Crew chief
Chevrolet	Chip Ganassi Racing	1	Kurt Busch	Matt McCall
Chevrolet	Chip Ganassi Racing	42	Ross Chastain	Phil Surgen
Chevrolet	Hendrick Motorsports	5	Kyle Larson	Cliff Daniels
Chevrolet	Hendrick Motorsports	9	Chase Elliott	Alan Gustafson 35; Tom Gray 1
Chevrolet	Hendrick Motorsports	24	William Byron	Rudy Fugle
Chevrolet	Hendrick Motorsports	48	Alex Bowman	Greg Ives
Chevrolet	JTG Daugherty Racing	47	Ricky Stenhouse Jr.	Brian Pattie
Chevrolet	Richard Childress Racing	3	Austin Dillon	Justin Alexander
Chevrolet	Richard Childress Racing	8	Tyler Reddick	Randall Burnett 35; Andrew Dickenson 1
Chevrolet	Richard Petty Motorsports	43	Erik Jones	Jerry Baxter
Chevrolet	Spire Motorsports	7	Corey LaJoie 35	Ryan Sparks 35; Steve Letarte 1
Chevrolet	Spire Motorsports	7	Josh Berry 1	Ryan Sparks 35; Steve Letarte 1
Chevrolet	Spire Motorsports	77	Jamie McMurray 1 (Note: Entry was fielded in a collaboration with Chip Ganassi Racing.)	Kevin Bellicourt 34; Peter Sospenzo 2
Chevrolet	Spire Motorsports	77	Justin Haley 30	Kevin Bellicourt 34; Peter Sospenzo 2
Chevrolet	Spire Motorsports	77	Stewart Friesen 1 (Note: Entry was fielded in a collaboration with Halmar Friesen Racing.)	Kevin Bellicourt 34; Peter Sospenzo 2
Chevrolet	Spire Motorsports	77	Josh Berry 1	Kevin Bellicourt 34; Peter Sospenzo 2
Chevrolet	Spire Motorsports	77	Ben Rhodes 1 (Note: Entry was fielded in a collaboration with ThorSport Racing.)	Kevin Bellicourt 34; Peter Sospenzo 2
Chevrolet	Spire Motorsports	77	Justin Allgaier 2 (Note: Entry was fielded in a collaboration with JR Motorsports.)	Kevin Bellicourt 34; Peter Sospenzo 2
Chevrolet	StarCom Racing	00	Quin Houff	George Church
Chevrolet	Trackhouse Racing	99	Daniel Suárez	Travis Mack 34; Jose Blasco-Figueroa 2
Ford	Front Row Motorsports	34	Michael McDowell	Drew Blickensderfer 35; Jason Sheets 1
Ford	Front Row Motorsports	38	Anthony Alfredo (R)	Seth Barbour 34; Derrick Finley 2
Ford	Live Fast Motorsports	78	B. J. McLeod 28	Frank Kerr
Ford	Live Fast Motorsports	78	Scott Heckert 3	Frank Kerr
Ford	Live Fast Motorsports	78	Shane Golobic 1 (Note: Entry was fielded in a collaboration with Matt Wood Racing.)	Frank Kerr
Ford	Live Fast Motorsports	78	Kyle Tilley 3	Frank Kerr
Ford	Live Fast Motorsports	78	Andy Lally 1	Frank Kerr
Ford	Rick Ware Racing	52	Josh Bilicki 35 (Note: Bilicki is running the full season for Rick Ware Racing split between the Nos. 15 and 52.)	Peter Sospenzo 10; Jason Houghtaling 26
Ford	Rick Ware Racing	52	Joey Hand 1 (Note: Entry was fielded in a collaboration with Stewart–Haas Racing.)	Peter Sospenzo 10; Jason Houghtaling 26
Ford	Roush Fenway Racing	6	Ryan Newman	Scott Graves 31; Luke Lambert 5
Ford	Roush Fenway Racing	17	Chris Buescher	Luke Lambert 31; Scott Graves 5
Ford	Stewart–Haas Racing	4	Kevin Harvick	Rodney Childers 35; Greg Zipadelli 1
Ford	Stewart–Haas Racing	10	Aric Almirola	Mike Bugarewicz
Ford	Stewart–Haas Racing	14	Chase Briscoe (R)	Johnny Klausmeier 35; Michael Cook 1
Ford	Stewart–Haas Racing	41	Cole Custer	Mike Shiplett 35; Davin Restivo 1
Ford	Team Penske	2	Brad Keselowski	Jeremy Bullins 33; Grant Hutchens 3
Ford	Team Penske	12	Ryan Blaney	Todd Gordon
Ford	Team Penske	22	Joey Logano	Paul Wolfe 35; Jonathan Hassler 1
Ford	Wood Brothers Racing	21	Matt DiBenedetto	Greg Erwin 15; Jonathan Hassler 21
Toyota	23XI Racing	23	Bubba Wallace	Mike Wheeler 28; Bootie Barker 8
Toyota	Joe Gibbs Racing	11	Denny Hamlin	Chris Gabehart
Toyota	Joe Gibbs Racing	18	Kyle Busch	Ben Beshore 35; Seth Chavka 1
Toyota	Joe Gibbs Racing	19	Martin Truex Jr.	James Small
Toyota	Joe Gibbs Racing	20	Christopher Bell	Adam Stevens 35; Chris Sherwood 1
Chevrolet 35 Ford 1	Petty Ware Racing (Note: The No. 51 car is officially listed on paper as Petty Ware Racing because they have a long-term partnership with Richard Petty Motorsports to use one of the charters they own. However, RPM is not involved with operating or helping this team out at the races in any way.)	51	Cody Ware 31	Mike Hillman Sr. 35; Billy Plourde 1
Chevrolet 35 Ford 1	Petty Ware Racing	51	Garrett Smithley 2	Mike Hillman Sr. 35; Billy Plourde 1
Chevrolet 35 Ford 1	Petty Ware Racing	51	J. J. Yeley 2	Mike Hillman Sr. 35; Billy Plourde 1
Chevrolet 35 Ford 1	Petty Ware Racing	51	James Davison 1	Mike Hillman Sr. 35; Billy Plourde 1
Chevrolet 34 Ford 2	Rick Ware Racing	15	Derrike Cope 1 (Note: Entry was fielded in a collaboration with StarCom Racing.)	Pat Tryson 23; Ken Evans 11; Billy Plourde 2
Chevrolet 34 Ford 2	Rick Ware Racing	15	James Davison 17	Pat Tryson 23; Ken Evans 11; Billy Plourde 2
Chevrolet 34 Ford 2	Rick Ware Racing	15	Joey Gase 8	Pat Tryson 23; Ken Evans 11; Billy Plourde 2
Chevrolet 34 Ford 2	Rick Ware Racing	15	Chris Windom 1 (Note: Entry was fielded in a collaboration with Jonathan Byrd's Racing and Hayward Motorsports.)	Pat Tryson 23; Ken Evans 11; Billy Plourde 2
Chevrolet 34 Ford 2	Rick Ware Racing	15	J. J. Yeley 1	Pat Tryson 23; Ken Evans 11; Billy Plourde 2
Chevrolet 34 Ford 2	Rick Ware Racing	15	Bayley Currey 1	Pat Tryson 23; Ken Evans 11; Billy Plourde 2
Chevrolet 34 Ford 2	Rick Ware Racing	15	R. C. Enerson 1	Pat Tryson 23; Ken Evans 11; Billy Plourde 2
Chevrolet 34 Ford 2	Rick Ware Racing	15	Garrett Smithley 4	Pat Tryson 23; Ken Evans 11; Billy Plourde 2
Chevrolet 34 Ford 2	Rick Ware Racing	15	Josh Bilicki 1	Pat Tryson 23; Ken Evans 11; Billy Plourde 2
Chevrolet 34 Ford 2	Rick Ware Racing	15	Ryan Ellis 1	Pat Tryson 23; Ken Evans 11; Billy Plourde 2
Ford 8 Chevrolet 28	Rick Ware Racing	53	Joey Gase 8	Billy Plourde 33; Mike Hillman Sr. 1 Ken Evans 2
Ford 8 Chevrolet 28	Rick Ware Racing	53	Garrett Smithley 21	Billy Plourde 33; Mike Hillman Sr. 1 Ken Evans 2
Ford 8 Chevrolet 28	Rick Ware Racing	53	J. J. Yeley 4	Billy Plourde 33; Mike Hillman Sr. 1 Ken Evans 2
Ford 8 Chevrolet 28	Rick Ware Racing	53	Cody Ware 1	Billy Plourde 33; Mike Hillman Sr. 1 Ken Evans 2
Ford 8 Chevrolet 28	Rick Ware Racing	53	Ryan Eversley 1	Billy Plourde 33; Mike Hillman Sr. 1 Ken Evans 2
Ford 8 Chevrolet 28	Rick Ware Racing	53	James Davison 1	Billy Plourde 33; Mike Hillman Sr. 1 Ken Evans 2

=== Non–chartered teams ===
==== Complete schedule ====
Models	Team	No.	Driver	Crew chief
Chevrolet	JTG Daugherty Racing	37	Ryan Preece	Trent Owens

==== Limited schedule ====
Manufacturer	Team	No.	Driver	Crew chief	Rounds
Chevrolet	Beard Motorsports	62	Noah Gragson	Darren Shaw	1
Chevrolet	Kaulig Racing	16	Kaz Grala	Matt Swiderski	3
Chevrolet	Kaulig Racing	16	A. J. Allmendinger	Matt Swiderski	5
Chevrolet	Kaulig Racing	16	Justin Haley	Matt Swiderski	1
Ford	B. J. McLeod Motorsports	55	Matt Mills	Lee Leslie	1
Ford	Front Row Motorsports	36	David Ragan	Derrick Finley	1
Ford	Team Penske	33	Austin Cindric	Miles Stanley	7
Toyota	Gaunt Brothers Racing	96	Ty Dillon	Dave Winston 3 Jacob Canter 5 A. J. Genail 1	5
Toyota	Gaunt Brothers Racing	96	Harrison Burton	Dave Winston 3 Jacob Canter 5 A. J. Genail 1	1
Toyota	Gaunt Brothers Racing	96	Landon Cassill	Dave Winston 3 Jacob Canter 5 A. J. Genail 1	2
Toyota	Gaunt Brothers Racing	96	Parker Kligerman	Dave Winston 3 Jacob Canter 5 A. J. Genail 1	1
Ford 2 Toyota 3	MBM Motorsports	13	Garrett Smithley (Note: Entries were fielded in a collaboration with Rick Ware Racing.)	Mark Hillman 1 Sebastian LaForge 1 Mike Contarino 2 Johnny Roten 1	1
Ford 2 Toyota 3	MBM Motorsports	13	David Starr	Mark Hillman 1 Sebastian LaForge 1 Mike Contarino 2 Johnny Roten 1	3
Ford 2 Toyota 3	MBM Motorsports	13	Timmy Hill	Mark Hillman 1 Sebastian LaForge 1 Mike Contarino 2 Johnny Roten 1	1
Ford 5 Toyota 17	MBM Motorsports	66	Timmy Hill	Clinton Cram 7 Mike Contarino 2 Johnny Roten 13	13
Ford 5 Toyota 17	MBM Motorsports	66	Mike Marlar	Clinton Cram 7 Mike Contarino 2 Johnny Roten 13	1
Ford 5 Toyota 17	MBM Motorsports	66	David Starr	Clinton Cram 7 Mike Contarino 2 Johnny Roten 13	4
Ford 5 Toyota 17	MBM Motorsports	66	Chad Finchum	Clinton Cram 7 Mike Contarino 2 Johnny Roten 13	2
Ford 5 Toyota 17	MBM Motorsports	66	J. J. Yeley	Clinton Cram 7 Mike Contarino 2 Johnny Roten 13	1
Ford 5 Toyota 17	MBM Motorsports	66	James Davison	Clinton Cram 7 Mike Contarino 2 Johnny Roten 13	1

=== Changes ===
==== Teams ====
- On July 23, 2020, it was reported that Leavine Family Racing owner Bob Leavine solicited bids for the team due to the financial fallout of the COVID-19 pandemic. On August 4, 2020, Leavine confirmed that his team has been sold and would cease operations at the end of the 2020 season. On August 11, 2020, the team's charter was officially sold to Spire Motorsports, which would be used to field a second full–time car in 2021 (which would end up being the No. 7 of Corey LaJoie). With its purchase of Leavine Family Racing's assets, Spire Motorsports will expand into a two–car operation in 2021. On August 24, 2020, the team announced that they would be looking for two full-time drivers for the season.
- On September 1, 2020, it was reported that Germain Racing owner Bob Germain was exploring conversations for a potential sale of the team due to lack of sponsorship, as their contract with primary sponsor GEICO expired at the end of the 2020 season and it was confirmed four days later that they would not return for the 2021 season. Their charter was later put up for bid, and was purchased on September 21, 2020, and as a result, Germain ceased operations at the end of the 2020 season.
- On September 21, 2020, retired NBA player and Charlotte Hornets owner Michael Jordan announced that he and Denny Hamlin would be forming 23XI Racing with Bubba Wallace as the driver after purchasing the charter from Germain Racing, which closed down after the 2020 season.
- On October 7, 2020, Trackhouse Racing, owned by Justin Marks, announced its entry into the Cup Series, fielding one full-time car, the No. 99, for Daniel Suárez in 2021. The team will run Chevrolets in a technical alliance with Richard Childress Racing. The team has leased the charter from the No. 77 Spire Motorsports car for this season. On January 15, 2021, it was announced that musician Pitbull would co-own the team with Marks.
- On October 8, 2020, it was revealed that Spire Motorsports bought a third charter, which they will use for the No. 77 in 2021 after the team leased the original charter for the No. 77 to Trackhouse for 2021. Upon further reports on December 30, 2020, it was revealed that this third charter for Spire came from JTG Daugherty Racing for the No. 37, which will now be non-chartered in 2021.
- On October 22, 2020, Go Fas Racing owner Archie St. Hilaire announced that the team would scale down to a part-time schedule in 2021. Joe Falk will continue to own half of the team's charter while St. Hilaire transfers his half to Falk's new business partner. The following day, it was announced that B. J. McLeod and Matt Tifft had purchased Go Fas Racing's ownership stake in the charter, and it would be moved from the No. 32 to McLeod's No. 78, meaning that car will run full-time with a charter in 2021. On November 20, 2020, McLeod and Tifft announced the team's name as Live Fast Motorsports, with a technical alliance with Stewart–Haas Racing.
- On October 28, 2020, Hendrick Motorsports announced that the No. 88 team would be renumbered to the No. 5 in 2021.
- On November 20, 2020, Kaulig Racing announced they would run a partial schedule in 2021, with the intention of entering all superspeedway and road course races and the goal of running full-time in 2022, hoping to purchase a charter by then.
- On December 2, 2020, NY Racing Team teased a potential return to Cup competition after posting the No. 44 with "2021" on their Instagram account, as well as updating their website, which stated that they would attempt to qualify for the 2021 Daytona 500.
- On December 30, 2020, Bob Pockrass reported that Wood Brothers Racing purchased the charter they had leased from Go Fas Racing since 2017.
- On January 5, 2021, team owner John Cohen announced that NYRT will compete full-time as an open team. The team last competed in the series in 2018 with J. J. Yeley running part-time in partnerships with Premium Motorsports and BK Racing as well as one race by themselves in the 2018 Coca-Cola 600.
- On February 3, 2021, MBM Motorsports announced that NASCAR approved its number change from No. 49 to No. 13, which it had requested after the demise of Germain Racing.
- On February 9, 2021, it was revealed through the list of owner points transfers prior to the start of the season that Tommy Baldwin Racing would use the No. 71 if they end up attempting any races in 2021, a number the team previously used in 2019. The team gave their old car number, the No. 7, to Spire Motorsports to use for their new second car with Corey LaJoie.
- On April 6, 2021, Rick Ware Racing announced that the No. 53 driven by Joey Gase would be renumbered to the No. 28 with a Havoline-inspired paint scheme for the spring Talladega race to honor the late Davey Allison. Gase would also drive the No. 28 (renumbered from the No. 17) at the Talladega Xfinity race.
- On April 26, 2021, it was announced that B. J. McLeod Motorsports would return to the Cup Series and field a car, the No. 55, for Matt Mills, one of their full-time Xfinity Series drivers, in the spring race at Kansas. (This entry was not a second car for Live Fast Motorsports, which McLeod also owns).

==== Drivers ====
- On August 6, 2020, Erik Jones and Joe Gibbs Racing announced that they would mutually part ways at the end of the 2020 season. On October 21, 2020, Jones officially joined Richard Petty Motorsports as the driver of the organization's No. 43 entry.
- On August 21, 2020, Corey LaJoie and Go Fas Racing announced that they would mutually part ways at the end of the 2020 season. On November 12, 2020, Sports Business Journal's Adam Stern reported that LaJoie was a leading candidate for one of the Spire Motorsports teams in 2021. On November 30, 2020, Spire announced that LaJoie would drive the team's new second car, the No. 7, full-time.
- On September 9, 2020, Matt Kenseth mentioned on SiriusXM's Late Shift that he would more than likely not return to the Chip Ganassi Racing No. 42 team in 2021. On September 21, 2020, Chip Ganassi Racing announced that Ross Chastain would replace Kenseth in 2021.
- On September 10, 2020, Bubba Wallace announced that he would not be back in the Richard Petty Motorsports No. 43 in 2021. On September 21, 2020, it was made official that he will be the driver of the 23XI Racing No. 23 car.
- On September 15, 2020, Daniel Suárez announced that he would not be back in the Gaunt Brothers Racing No. 96 in 2021. On October 7, 2020, Suárez joined Trackhouse Racing full-time for the 2021 season.
- On October 6, 2020, Hendrick Motorsports announced that Alex Bowman will move from the No. 88 to the No. 48 team in 2021.
- On October 8, 2020, Team Penske announced that Austin Cindric will drive the No. 33 Ford in select Cup Series races while competing full-time in the Xfinity Series in 2021. He would then transition to the Wood Brothers Racing No. 21 team in 2022.
- On October 8, 2020, Clint Bowyer announced he would retire from full-time driving at the end of the 2020 season and work as a NASCAR on Fox commentator in 2021. Chase Briscoe, who previously drove for SHR in the Xfinity Series in their No. 98 car, replaced Bowyer in the No. 14.
- On October 19, 2020, NASCAR reinstated Kyle Larson six months after he was suspended from the sport and fired by Chip Ganassi Racing for using a racial slur during an iRacing event. He will be cleared to resume all NASCAR activities on January 1, 2021. On October 28, 2020, Hendrick Motorsports announced that Larson would drive the No. 5 (renumbered from the No. 88) for the team, replacing Alex Bowman, who moved over to the No. 48 to replace Jimmie Johnson. On July 14, 2021, Larson signed a contract extension with HMS through 2023.
- On November 16, 2020, John Hunter Nemechek announced he would not return to Front Row Motorsports in 2021. On November 23, 2020, it was announced that Nemechek would return to the Camping World Truck Series to drive full-time for Kyle Busch Motorsports in 2021.
- On December 19, 2020, MBM Motorsports announced that Timmy Hill, Chad Finchum, and Stephen Leicht (who drives for the team's Xfinity Series program) will return to the team in 2021, with Hill and Finchum attempting to run the 2021 Daytona 500.
- On December 22, 2020, Adam Stern of Sports Business Journal reported that Anthony Alfredo was in talks with Front Row Motorsports to drive the No. 38 in 2021. On January 6, 2021, FRM confirmed that Alfredo will drive the No. 38 for the Rookie of the Year honors.
- On December 23, 2020, Chris Knight of Catchfence reported that JR Motorsports Xfinity Series driver and 2020 Daytona 300 winner Noah Gragson would attempt to qualify for the 2021 Daytona 500 in the No. 62 for Beard Motorsports. Since 2017, Brendan Gaughan, who retired after the 2020 season, drove this car at each of the restrictor plate races (as well as the Daytona Road Course in 2020). The team would officially announce this on January 14, 2021.
- On January 6, 2021, Front Row Motorsports announced that David Ragan would return to the No. 36 for the 2021 Daytona 500.
- On January 13, 2021, Kaulig Racing announced that Kaz Grala would attempt to qualify for the 2021 Daytona 500 for the team in the No. 16. On January 21, 2021, Kaulig announced that A. J. Allmendinger would drive the No. 16 at the Daytona road course, making his first start in the Cup Series since the end of the 2018 season.
- On January 15, 2021, Jim Utter of Motorsport.com reported that Ty Dillon was likely to drive the No. 96 Gaunt Brothers Racing car at the Daytona 500 as well as the Daytona Road Course race the following week. It is unclear if he will run any additional races for the team beyond that. On February 3, 2021, 23XI Racing announced that Dillon would drive the No. 23 at the 2021 Busch Clash, as he was eligible after winning a stage in 2020 while regular driver Bubba Wallace was not. On August 23, 2021, Gaunt Brothers Racing announced that Landon Cassill would drive the No. 96 at the 2021 Coke Zero Sugar 400 at Daytona and the 2021 YellaWood 500 at Talladega.
- On January 19, 2021, Spire Motorsports announced that Jamie McMurray would drive the No. 77 at the 2021 Daytona 500.
- On January 19, 2021, Rick Ware Racing announced that Derrike Cope would make his final Daytona 500 start in the No. 15.
- On March 15, 2021, MBM Motorsports announced that 2018 World of Outlaws Late Model Series champion Mike Marlar, who drove for the team in the Xfinity Series at Richmond in September 2019, would make his Cup Series debut in the Bristol dirt race for the team in the No. 66.
- On March 16, 2021, Spire Motorsports announced that full-time Truck Series driver and accomplished dirt racer Stewart Friesen would make his Cup Series debut in their No. 77 in the Bristol dirt race. Although Friesen's Truck team, Halmar Friesen Racing, is a factory-backed Toyota team, Friesen competed for Spire, a Chevrolet team, in this one race.
- On April 13, 2021, Rick Ware Racing announced that longtime Truck Series driver Jennifer Jo Cobb would make her Cup debut in the spring race at Talladega in their No. 15. She becomes the first female driver to compete in the Cup Series since Danica Patrick retired after the 2018 Daytona 500. Cobb has competed for RWR in the past in select Xfinity races in 2011, 2013, 2014, and 2016. However, on April 19, 2021, NASCAR announced that Cobb would not be approved to compete in the race, due to lack of prior Cup experience and the lack of practice and qualifying. A similar situation happened with James Davison and Keith McGee, who were not approved for the 2020 Cup and Truck races at Talladega, respectively. J. J. Yeley would replace Cobb in the RWR No. 15 in the race.
- On April 15, 2021, it was announced that Joe Gibbs Racing Xfinity Series driver Harrison Burton, the son of retired driver and current NASCAR on NBC color commentator Jeff Burton, would make his Cup Series debut in the Gaunt Brothers Racing No. 96 in the spring race at Talladega. He would become the first driver born in the 2000s decade and the 21st century to run a Cup Series race.
- On May 14, 2021, Spire Motorsports announced that Josh Berry would drive the No. 77 at Dover as a substitute for Justin Haley, who was sidelined in accordance with team and COVID-19 protocols. This was his Cup Series debut. On June 27, 2021, Justin Allgaier substituted for Haley in the second race of the Cup Series doubleheader at Pocono after Haley had to recover from a hard crash in the Xfinity race earlier in the same day. This was the third time that Allgaier was called on as a last minute substitute replacement driver, after filling in for Michael Annett in the 2016 Bristol Night Race and Jimmie Johnson in the 2020 Brickyard 400.
- On August 19, 2021, Spire Motorsports announced that Josh Berry would drive the No. 7 at Michigan as a substitute for Corey LaJoie, who was sidelined in accordance with team and COVID-19 protocols.
- On September 10, 2021, Rick Ware Racing announced that Garrett Smithley would drive the No. 51 at the Richmond playoff race as a substitute for Cody Ware, who was sidelined with carbon monoxide poisoning following the 2021 Cook Out Southern 500 at Darlington.
- On October 5, 2021, Rick Ware Racing announced that sports car racing driver Joey Hand would make his NASCAR and Cup Series debut in the No. 52 at the Charlotte Roval, and his entry would be fielded in a partnership with Stewart–Haas Racing. The normal driver of the No. 52, Josh Bilicki, instead drove RWR's No. 15 car in this race.
- On October 18, 2021, Gaunt Brothers Racing announced that Parker Kligerman would drive the No. 96 at Kansas. He would also serve as an in-race analyst for NASCAR on NBC during the race.

==== Crew chiefs ====
- On September 29, 2020, it was announced that the crew chiefing career of Hendrick Motorsports' seven-time championship winning crew chief Chad Knaus would end after the 2020 season, as he would be promoted to Vice President of Competition for the team starting in 2021. On October 26, 2020, it was announced that Knaus' replacement on the No. 24 car of William Byron will be Rudy Fugle, a decorated Truck Series crew chief for Kyle Busch Motorsports, who worked with Byron in 2016, winning seven races together. Fugle has won 28 races, two drivers' championships and five owners' championships with KBM.
- On October 6, 2020, Hendrick Motorsports announced that crew chief Greg Ives will join Alex Bowman in moving from the No. 88 to the No. 48 team in 2021.
- On October 28, 2020, Cliff Daniels, formerly the crew chief for Jimmie Johnson on the No. 48, was announced to be crew chief for Kyle Larson in Hendrick Motorsports' No. 5 (formerly No. 88) car, switching teams with Ives.
- On October 30, 2020, 23XI Racing announced that Mike Wheeler would be the crew chief of the No. 23 with Bubba Wallace in 2021. On September 16, 2020, Bootie Barker was named crew chief for the remainder of the season after Wheeler was promoted to Director of Competition.
- On November 13, 2020, Trackhouse Racing announced that Travis Mack will be the crew chief for Daniel Suárez in the No. 99. Mack previously served as crew chief for Michael Annett in the JR Motorsports No. 1 team in the NASCAR Xfinity Series from 2019 to 2020.
- On November 17, 2020, Joe Gibbs Racing announced changes to their crew chief lineup in 2021.
  - Adam Stevens, previously the crew chief of Kyle Busch's No. 18, moved to the No. 20 JGR Cup team, now driven by Christopher Bell, replacing Chris Gayle.
  - Chris Gayle became the crew chief of JGR's No. 54 team in the Xfinity Series, replacing Jacob Canter, JGR's test team manager.
  - Jason Ratcliff, previously the crew chief of the JGR-aligned No. 95 Leavine Family Racing team, which has closed down, moved back to the Xfinity Series to become the crew chief of the No. 20 of Harrison Burton, replacing Ben Beshore.
  - Ben Beshore moved up to the Cup Series and replaced Stevens as the crew chief of the No. 18 of Kyle Busch.
- On December 10, 2020, Spire Motorsports announced their 2021 crew chief lineup.
  - Ryan Sparks will be the crew chief for Corey LaJoie's No. 7, after previously working with LaJoie at Go Fas Racing in 2020. On February 24, 2021, it was announced that Steve Letarte would fill in for Sparks at Homestead due to COVID-19 protocols.
  - Kevin Bellicourt, previously the crew chief for Derek Kraus at McAnally–Hilgemann Racing in the Truck Series, will be the No. 77 crew chief, replacing Peter Sospenzo.
- On January 20, 2021, Team Penske announced that Ryan Blaney's engineer on the No. 12 car, Miles Stanley, would be the crew chief for their new part-time No. 33 car with Austin Cindric.
- On January 27, 2021, Kaulig Racing announced that Matt Swiderski, who was previously the crew chief for Team Penske's part-time No. 12 car in the Xfinity Series, would serve as crew chief for their part-time Cup Series No. 16 car.
- On January 28, 2021, it was announced that Frank Kerr would be the crew chief for the No. 78 of B. J. McLeod and his Live Fast Motorsports team in 2021. In 2020, Kerr spent part of the season with Niece Motorsports and part of the season with Martins Motorsports. The last time he was a Cup Series crew chief was in 2018 when he crew chiefed the TriStar Motorsports No. 72 of Corey LaJoie and Cole Whitt.
- On June 8, 2021, Wood Brothers Racing announced that Jonathan Hassler would replace Greg Erwin as the permanent crew chief of the team's No. 21, driven by Matt DiBenedetto. Hassler was previously an engineer with Team Penske, which WBR has an alliance with, and the team's interim crew chief at Martinsville when Erwin was suspended. It is unclear why Erwin was replaced and what his future plans are.
- On October 3, 2021, it was announced that Roush Fenway Racing crew chiefs Scott Graves and Luke Lambert will be switching teams, with Graves moving from the No. 6 of Ryan Newman to the No. 17 of Chris Buescher and Lambert moving from Buescher's No. 17 to Newman's No. 6. This change will take effect starting with the Bank of America Roval 400 at Charlotte.

==== Interim crew chiefs ====
- On February 24, 2021, Spire Motorsports announced that Ryan Sparks, the crew chief of their No. 7 car of Corey LaJoie, would be unable to crew chief the car at Homestead-Miami due to being in quarantine after exposure to someone with COVID-19. NASCAR on NBC color commentator Steve Letarte, a retired crew chief who Spire had recently hired as a consultant, returned atop the pit box for the first time since 2014. Because the race was being broadcast by Fox, Letarte did not need to be in the booth for it and was available to crew chief the car for this one race.
- On March 8, 2021, it was revealed through the release of the entry list for the race at Phoenix in March that Davin Restivo would be the interim crew chief for Cole Custer's No. 41 for Stewart–Haas Racing in that race. Mike Shiplett, Custer's crew chief, was suspended for one race after the No. 41 had two loose lug nuts following the previous week's race at Homestead-Miami. Restivo is the car's engineer.
- On March 16, 2021, NASCAR announced that Brad Keselowski's crew chief Jeremy Bullins, and Daniel Suárez's crew chief Travis Mack, would both be suspended for the Folds of Honor QuikTrip 500 at Atlanta. Both cars had two loose lug nuts following the previous week's race at Phoenix. The engineers for both teams, Grant Hutchens (for Keselowski's Penske No. 2) and Jose Blasco-Figueroa (for Suárez's Trackhouse No. 99), would become the interim crew chiefs for those teams in the race at Atlanta in March. In addition, Suárez and Blasco-Figueroa made history as the first Hispanic driver-crew chief combination in Cup Series history after working together in this race.
- On April 8, 2021, Wood Brothers Racing announced that Greg Erwin, the crew chief of the No. 21 of Matt DiBenedetto, would be unable to crew chief the car at Martinsville in April after testing positive for COVID-19. Jonathan Hassler, an engineer for Team Penske, would serve as the team's interim crew chief in the race.
- On April 10, 2021, NASCAR announced that Travis Mack, the crew chief of the No. 99 of Daniel Suárez for Trackhouse, would be suspended again, this time due to the car having an improperly attached ballast prior to the race at Martinsville in April. As a result, Jose Blasco-Figueroa would return as the team's interim crew chief that weekend.
- On May 6, 2021, it was reported that Grant Hutchens would return as Brad Keselowski's interim crew chief for the 2021 Goodyear 400 at Darlington and the 2021 Drydene 400 at Dover. Jeremy Bullins had to skip both races due to COVID-19 protocols.
- On May 10, 2021, NASCAR announced that Joey Logano's crew chief Paul Wolfe would be suspended for the 2021 Drydene 400 at Dover after the No. 22 had two loose lug nuts following the previous week's race at Darlington. Team Penske engineer Jonathan Hassler served as the team's interim crew chief in the race.
- On May 30, 2021, NASCAR announced that Kevin Bellicourt, the crew chief of the No. 77 for Spire Motorsports, would be suspended for the 2021 Toyota/Save Mart 350 at Sonoma after the car had two loose lug nuts following the previous week's race, the 2021 Coca-Cola 600. Peter Sospenzo, who Bellicourt replaced as the crew chief of the No. 77 in 2021, was announced as the interim crew chief for the race. Sospenzo also was the crew chief for Spire in the team's upset win at Daytona in July 2019 with Justin Haley. On September 11, 2021, Bellicourt was once again suspended for the Bristol night race after the car had two loose lug nuts following the race at Richmond.
- On June 6, 2021, NASCAR announced that Front Row Motorsports crew chief Seth Barbour would be suspended for the race at Sonoma due to his No. 38 car, driven by Anthony Alfredo, failing pre-race inspection. The interim crew chief was Derrick Finley, FRM's competition director. On August 28, 2021, Barbour and Drew Blickensderfer, the crew chief for the No. 34 of Michael McDowell (the other FRM car), were suspended for the race at Daytona after their cars failed pre-race inspection. Jason Sheets, the car chief for the No. 34, would serve as the interim crew chief for McDowell's No. 34 while Finley returned to crew chief Alfredo's No. 38 as he did at Sonoma.
- On June 13, 2021, NASCAR announced that Chip Ganassi Racing crew chief Phil Surgen would be suspended for the All-Star race weekend due to his No. 42 car, driven by Ross Chastain, failing pre-race inspection. The interim crew chief was Tony Lunders, CGR's competition director.
- On July 4, 2021, NASCAR announced that Chase Briscoe's crew chief Johnny Klausmeier would be suspended for the race at Atlanta that month after the No. 14 had two loose lug nuts following the race at Road America. Michael Cook, Briscoe's engineer, served as his interim crew chief for that race.
- On August 8, 2021, Chase Elliott's No. 9 and Christopher Bell's No. 20 were given L1 penalties for rear window air deflector issues in pre-race inspection before the race at Watkins Glen. As a result, their crew chiefs, Alan Gustafson and Adam Stevens, respectively, were suspended. The interim crew chiefs were Elliott's engineer, Tom Gray, and Bell's car chief, Chris Sherwood. On October 24, 2021, Stevens was once again suspended for the Martinsville playoff race after the No. 20 had two loose lug nuts following the Kansas playoff race.
- On September 26, 2021, NASCAR announced that Kevin Harvick's crew chief Rodney Childers would be suspended for the Talladega playoff race after the No. 4 had two loose lug nuts following the race at Las Vegas. Greg Zipadelli would serve as Harvick's crew chief for the race.
- On October 10, 2021, NASCAR announced that Kyle Busch's crew chief Ben Beshore would be suspended for the Texas race after the No. 18 had two loose lug nuts following the race at the Charlotte Roval.
- On November 4, 2021, Richard Childress Racing announced that Tyler Reddick's crew chief Randall Burnett would miss the 2021 Season Finale 500 at Phoenix due to COVID-19 protocols and would be replaced by team engineer Andrew Dickenson for the race.

==== Manufacturers ====
- On October 1, 2020, Hendrick Motorsports and Richard Childress Racing announced that they would form a joint venture to establish a common engine specification for Chevrolet teams starting in 2021.
- On October 30, 2020, 23XI Racing revealed that they would run Toyotas in a technical alliance with Joe Gibbs Racing.

== Rule changes ==
- Following Joey Logano's flip in the spring race at Talladega, NASCAR mandated that an optional extra bar in the roll cage be mandatory at Daytona and Talladega. In addition, the tapered spacer was reduced decreasing horsepower from 520 to 470. The spoiler for the two tracks was also changed, removing the wickerbill on the top edge to reduce drag and lessen the draft.
- The color of the windshield banners and spoilers for playoff drivers' cars will be yellow for the first time since 2016, which was the last year that Sprint (one of their logo colors is yellow) was the title sponsor of the series. They were green from 2017 to 2019, which were the years that Monster Energy (one of their logo colors is green) was the series title sponsor. In 2020, there was no color change to the windshield banners for the playoff drivers, and instead the word "playoffs" replaced the series logo on the front windshield banner.

== Schedule ==
The 2021 schedule was released on September 30, 2020.

No	Race title	Track	Location	Date	Time (ET)
	Busch Clash	R Daytona International Speedway (Road Course)	Daytona Beach, Florida	February 9	7:00 PM
	Bluegreen Vacations Duel	O Daytona International Speedway	Daytona Beach, Florida	February 11	7:00 PM
1	**Daytona 500**	O Daytona International Speedway	Daytona Beach, Florida	February 14–15 (Note: Race started on Sunday, but finished on Monday at around midnight due to rain after 20 laps.)	2:30 PM
2	O'Reilly Auto Parts 253	R Daytona International Speedway (Road Course)	Daytona Beach, Florida	February 21	3:00 PM
3	Dixie Vodka 400	O Homestead–Miami Speedway	Homestead, Florida	February 28	3:30 PM
4	Pennzoil 400 presented by Jiffy Lube	O Las Vegas Motor Speedway	Las Vegas, Nevada	March 7	3:30 PM
5	Instacart 500	O Phoenix Raceway	Avondale, Arizona	March 14	3:30 PM
6	Folds of Honor QuikTrip 500	O Atlanta Motor Speedway	Hampton, Georgia	March 21	3:00 PM
7	Food City Dirt Race	D Bristol Motor Speedway (Dirt)	Bristol, Tennessee	March 29 (Note: The Food City Dirt Race was supposed to be held on Sunday, March 28, but was postponed to Monday due to heavy rain and flooding. The heat qualifying races were also cancelled.)	4:00 PM
8	Blue-Emu Maximum Pain Relief 500	O Martinsville Speedway	Ridgeway, Virginia	April 10–11 (Note: Race started on Saturday, but finished on Sunday due to rainfall after over 50 laps.)	7:30 PM
9	Toyota Owners 400	O Richmond Raceway	Richmond, Virginia	April 18	3:00 PM
10	GEICO 500	O Talladega Superspeedway	Lincoln, Alabama	April 25	2:00 PM
11	Buschy McBusch Race 400	O Kansas Speedway	Kansas City, Kansas	May 2	3:00 PM
12	Goodyear 400	O Darlington Raceway	Darlington, South Carolina	May 9	3:30 PM
13	Drydene 400	O Dover International Speedway	Dover, Delaware	May 16	2:00 PM
14	EchoPark Texas Grand Prix	R Circuit of the Americas	Austin, Texas	May 23	2:30 PM
15	**Coca-Cola 600**	O Charlotte Motor Speedway	Concord, North Carolina	May 30	6:00 PM
16	Toyota/Save Mart 350	R Sonoma Raceway	Sonoma, California	June 6	4:00 PM
	NASCAR All Star Open	O Texas Motor Speedway	Fort Worth, Texas	June 13	6:00 PM
	NASCAR All-Star Race	O Texas Motor Speedway	Fort Worth, Texas	June 13	8:00 PM
17	Ally 400	O Nashville Superspeedway	Lebanon, Tennessee	June 20	3:30 PM
18	Pocono Organics CBD 325	O Pocono Raceway	Long Pond, Pennsylvania	June 26	3:00 PM
19	Explore the Pocono Mountains 350	O Pocono Raceway	Long Pond, Pennsylvania	June 27	3:30 PM
20	Jockey Made in America 250	R Road America	Elkhart Lake, Wisconsin	July 4	2:30 PM
21	Quaker State 400	O Atlanta Motor Speedway	Hampton, Georgia	July 11	3:30 PM
22	Foxwoods Resort Casino 301	O New Hampshire Motor Speedway	Loudon, New Hampshire	July 18	3:00 PM
23	Go Bowling at The Glen	R Watkins Glen International	Watkins Glen, New York	August 8	3:00 PM
24	Verizon 200 at the Brickyard	R Indianapolis Motor Speedway (Road Course)	Speedway, Indiana	August 15	1:00 PM
25	FireKeepers Casino 400	O Michigan International Speedway	Brooklyn, Michigan	August 22	3:00 PM
26	Coke Zero Sugar 400	O Daytona International Speedway	Daytona Beach, Florida	August 28	7:00 PM
NASCAR Cup Series Playoffs
Round of 16
27	**Cook Out Southern 500**	O Darlington Raceway	Darlington, South Carolina	September 5	6:00 PM
28	Federated Auto Parts 400	O Richmond Raceway	Richmond, Virginia	September 11	7:30 PM
29	Bass Pro Shops Night Race	O Bristol Motor Speedway	Bristol, Tennessee	September 18	7:30 PM
Round of 12
30	South Point 400	O Las Vegas Motor Speedway	Las Vegas, Nevada	September 26	7:00 PM
31	YellaWood 500	O Talladega Superspeedway	Lincoln, Alabama	October 4 (Note: The YellaWood 500 was supposed to be held on Sunday, October 3, but was postponed to Monday due to rain.)	1:00 PM
32	Bank of America Roval 400	R Charlotte Motor Speedway (Roval)	Concord, North Carolina	October 10	2:00 PM
Round of 8
33	Autotrader EchoPark Automotive 500	O Texas Motor Speedway	Fort Worth, Texas	October 17	2:00 PM
34	Hollywood Casino 400	O Kansas Speedway	Kansas City, Kansas	October 24	3:00 PM
35	Xfinity 500	O Martinsville Speedway	Ridgeway, Virginia	October 31	2:00 PM
Championship 4
36	NASCAR Cup Series Championship Race	O Phoenix Raceway	Avondale, Arizona	November 7	3:00 PM

=== Notes ===
O Oval track
R Road course

Bolded races indicate a NASCAR Major, also known as a Crown Jewel race.

=== Schedule changes ===
- The Busch Clash moved from the Sunday before the Daytona 500 to the Tuesday before (on February 9) in an effort to condense Speedweeks down to one week. The race was also moved from the oval to the infield road course for the first time, perhaps due to concerns created by a "Big One" in 2020.
- Nashville Superspeedway will host a Cup race, scheduled for Sunday, June 20 (Father's Day). It will be the first time the speedway will host a NASCAR Cup Series event, and the first time the track has hosted any NASCAR events since 2011. To put the track on the schedule, its owner, Dover Motorsports, moved one of their two Cup races at Dover (a track which they also own) to Nashville.
- Chicagoland Speedway did not receive a race on the 2021 schedule. Darlington Raceway, which was given a second race on the schedule after Chicagoland could not host a race in 2020 due to state COVID regulations in Illinois, received a second race permanently for the first time since 2004, and would be run in May on Mother's Day weekend. The track previously had a race on that weekend from 2005 to 2013.
- Atlanta Motor Speedway was given a second race for the first time since 2010, which replaced the race at Kentucky Speedway, the Quaker State 400. The new Atlanta race will have the same title sponsorship, race distance, and be run on the same July weekend that Kentucky previously had.
- Road America was added back to the schedule for the first time since 1956 where a Grand National race took place. The race is scheduled for July 4, replacing the race weekend at Indianapolis Motor Speedway, which has been moved to August and will see the track's road course configuration used.
- Subsequently, Michigan International Speedway loses one of its dates to Road America and will have only one race on the schedule for the first time since 1973.
- The Cup Series also raced on dirt for the first time since 1970 as the spring race at Bristol Motor Speedway had the concrete half-mile covered in dirt.
- After it lost one of its two races to Circuit of the Americas, NASCAR moved the All-Star Race, traditionally held at Charlotte Motor Speedway, to Texas Motor Speedway.
- The playoff races at Texas and Kansas swapped weekends, with Texas now being the first race of the Round of 8 and the fourth-to-last race of the season, and Kansas becoming the second race of the Round of 8 and the third-to-last race of the season.

=== Schedule changes due to the COVID-19 pandemic ===
- Owing to the ongoing COVID-19 pandemic, only 8 of the 36 points races were held with practice and qualifying; the remaining events were held as one-day shows. The races that featured practice and qualifying were limited to new venues/configurations and high-profile events and included: the Daytona 500, the Food City Dirt Race at Bristol, the EchoPark Texas Grand Prix at COTA, the Coca-Cola 600, the Ally 400 at Nashville, the Jockey Made in America 250 at Road America, the Verizon 200 at the Brickyard at the Indianapolis road course, and the Season Finale 500 at Phoenix.
- On December 8, 2020, it was announced that Auto Club Speedway would not host a race in 2021 due to state COVID regulations in California. With the season-opening races for all three series at Daytona being two weeks before, NASCAR made the Daytona Road Course the second race of the season and bumped the Homestead-Miami Speedway race back by one week to where Auto Club had been.

== Season summary ==
=== Race reports ===
Speedweeks 2021

In the Busch Clash, Ryan Blaney started on pole. Kevin Harvick spun twice early in the race. Martin Truex Jr. was leading when the competition caution came out but had to restart in the rear due to missing the final chicane while the race was under caution. Late in the race, Truex Jr. wrecked while leading. In the closing laps, Blaney and Chase Elliott were battling for the lead. In the final chicane on the last lap, Elliott took an aggressive line, which spun Blaney out of the lead. Elliott slowed, which allowed Kyle Busch to pass him and win the race. It was the first year that the race was run on the road course, and the second Cup Series race run on the track's road course layout.

In Daytona 500 qualifying, Alex Bowman won the pole while teammate William Byron qualified second.

In the Bluegreen Vacation Duel, Aric Almirola held off Joey Logano to win the first Duel. The start of the second Duel was delayed by rain. In the second Duel, there were multicar wrecks on lap 36 and with three laps to go in the race; the latter caution sent the race into an overtime finish. In overtime, Austin Dillon held off Bubba Wallace to win the second Duel.

Round 1: Daytona 500

Alex Bowman would start on pole, as the race was under threat from rain and thunderstorms. Derrike Cope would hit the wall on lap 4 to bring out the first caution while also causing damage to Bubba Wallace. On lap 14, "The Big One" would strike in turn 3 as Bowman and Aric Almirola would both spin into the outside wall and into the path of traffic, collecting 16 cars. Two laps later, while under the ensuing caution, the race was red-flagged for 5 hours and 40 minutes due to a lightning strike over the racetrack. The race would restart with Kevin Harvick as the leader. Defending winner Denny Hamlin would both win stages 1 and 2. Christopher Bell would lose a left-rear tire and spin, collecting Ricky Stenhouse Jr. and Jamie McMurray in stage 2. The final stage would remain caution-free as Hamlin, in contention to win the race for the third consecutive time, would pit from the lead on final pit stops, but would fall back to 13th as the pack fell in line single file with Joey Logano leading. On the last lap, Brad Keselowski attempted to pass Logano on the backstretch with help from a push from Michael McDowell, but the push incidentally spun Keselowski into Logano's left rear quarter panel, causing a fiery crash sending Keselowski into the catchfence and collecting Wallace, Logano, Austin Cindric, Kyle Larson, Kyle Busch, Ryan Preece, and Ross Chastain. McDowell would dodge the crash to win his first career NASCAR Cup Series race under caution as well as earning Front Row Motorsports their third Cup victory.

Round 2: O'Reilly Auto Parts 253

Chase Elliott was awarded the pole. Michael McDowell, who started second, got a flat tire before entering the first turn as Kyle Busch got damage by running into the grass. Elliott won the first stage while Denny Hamlin would win the second stage. Kurt Busch spun while leading and then made contact and spun Brad Keselowski the following lap. On a restart, Elliott got into the grass while Kyle Larson spun while battling for the lead. Elliott made his way back to the front, but spun after contact with Hamlin. Joey Logano pulled away from Kurt Busch, but was run down and passed by Christopher Bell, who would win the race for his first career Cup Series win.

Round 3: Dixie Vodka 400

Denny Hamlin was awarded the pole, but had to start at the rear due to an unapproved adjustment. Chris Buescher had the dominant car early and won the first stage, while Hamlin struggled to get to the front of the field. Buescher led early in the second stage, but Martin Truex Jr. took the lead and dominated most of the remainder of the stage. In a one lap dash to end the second stage, Hamlin slid into Truex and it allowed William Byron to win the stage. Kurt Busch had to return to pit road during a round of green flag pit stops due to a loose wheel. Aric Almirola got into the wall along with Ryan Blaney. Byron was able to get back to the lead and pulled away to hold off a charging Tyler Reddick for his second career Cup Series win.

Round 4: Pennzoil 400

Kevin Harvick was awarded the pole. Brad Keselowski would hold off Chase Elliott to win the first stage while Kyle Larson won the second stage. On a restart, Elliott spun after contact with Kurt Busch. Aric Almirola got into the wall after a flat tire. After the final round of green flag pit stops, Larson was able to take the lead from Daniel Suárez and hold off Keselowski for his first win with Hendrick Motorsports and his first win on an mile and a half track.

Round 5: Instacart 500

Brad Keselowski was awarded the pole. Alex Bowman spun after contact with Austin Dillon. Ryan Blaney won the first stage. Anthony Alfredo slammed the wall after contact with Cody Ware. Joey Logano won the second stage and dominated the final stage. Tyler Reddick got into the wall while Aric Almirola had to slow for a lapped car and got hit by Kyle Busch. On the restart, Martin Truex Jr. took the lead from Logano and pulled away for his 28th career win, tying Carl Edwards on NASCAR's all-time win list.

Round 6: Folds of Honor QuikTrip 500

Denny Hamlin was awarded the pole. Kyle Larson dominated the majority of the race by winning both stages. Kevin Harvick had to pit early in the first stage due to a flat tire. The race remained green for the majority of the race except for when Kurt Busch got into the wall after contact with Hamlin and when Chase Elliott blew an engine. Lapped traffic came in play at the end as Ryan Blaney was able to run down Larson and pass him for the lead and pull away to his fifth career win.

Round 7: Food City Dirt Race

This was the first dirt race for the Cup Series since the 1970 NASCAR Cup Series season. Kyle Larson was awarded the pole after the scheduled heat races were canceled due to rain, but had to start at the rear after changing engines in practice. The race was postponed from Sunday to Monday due to the rain. Martin Truex Jr. dominated most of the race. The first stage was littered with accidents caused. Aric Almirola got turned after contact with Stewart Friesen (who was making his first Cup Series start), involving multiple other drivers. Ryan Newman spun and Stewart–Haas teammates Kevin Harvick and Chase Briscoe got together trying to avoid the incident. Christopher Bell spun while running second and collected Larson and Ross Chastain. Truex would win the first stage. In the second stage, Truex would lose the lead to Daniel Suárez while Larson would wreck again, ending his race and collecting Ryan Blaney, Kyle Busch, Austin Dillon, Alex Bowman, Ryan Preece, and Michael McDowell. Briscoe would get in the wall again after contact with Brad Keselowski. After this crash, NASCAR elected to conduct all restarts going forward single-file to help with visibility, as the flying dust made it hard for drivers to see. Joey Logano would take the lead from Suarez and win the second stage. Logano would dominate the final stage and hold off Ricky Stenhouse Jr. in overtime to become the series' seventh different winner of the season.

Round 8: Blue-Emu Maximum Pain Relief 500

Denny Hamlin was awarded the pole. The race was postponed from Saturday to Sunday due to rain. Hamlin dominated and won both stages. Kurt Busch got into the wall after contact with Erik Jones while Aric Almirola spun into the wall after contact with Matt DiBenedetto. Brad Keselowski got into the wall along with Daniel Suárez, whose car caught fire. Keselowski again got into the wall along with Jones and Ross Chastain. Chris Buescher got turned and caused a huge stack up that collected Keselowski, DiBenedetto, Ryan Preece, Anthony Alfredo, Alex Bowman, and others. Martin Truex Jr. would outduel the dominant Hamlin and hold off Chase Elliott for his second win of the season.

Round 9: Toyota Owners 400

Martin Truex Jr. was awarded the pole. Truex, along with Denny Hamlin dominated, but Hamlin won both stages and led the most laps. Ryan Newman and Kevin Harvick both spun into the wall after having flat tires. Hamlin continued his domination, but would be passed for the lead by Alex Bowman, who recovered from an uncontrolled tire penalty, with ten laps to go and Bowman pulled away for his third career Cup Series victory and taking the 48 to victory lane for the first time since Jimmie Johnson at Dover in 2017.

Round 10: GEICO 500

Denny Hamlin was awarded the pole. Kyle Larson suffered a blown engine and fall out of the race on only the third lap. On the final lap of the first stage, Joey Logano spun and went airborne, flipping onto its roof. The car's spoiler scraped the roof of Bubba Wallace (who continued on) before rolling back onto all fours at the bottom of turn 3. Matt DiBenedetto was awarded the stage win. On the final lap of the second stage, Hamlin got turned into the wall and collected Chase Elliott, Alex Bowman, and Martin Truex Jr. while Wallace was awarded the stage win, the first of his career. Ricky Stenhouse Jr. would be spun off the bumper of Quin Houff and nose into the wall coming to pit road during green flag pit stops. Truex would suffer a flat tire, bringing out a caution and sending the race to overtime. Brad Keselowski would drive past DiBenedetto and hold off William Byron as several drivers crashed on the final lap to score his sixth career win at Talladega, tying Dale Earnhardt Jr. and Jeff Gordon for second on the all-time Talladega win list behind Dale Earnhardt.

Round 11: Buschy McBusch Race 400

Brad Keselowski was awarded the pole. Kyle Busch won the first stage while Kyle Larson won the second stage. Larson dominated the race, but was passed for the lead by Denny Hamlin. Hamlin got into the wall while battling Larson and then got into the wall again after a flat tire. On the restart, Ricky Stenhouse Jr. spun after contact with Austin Cindric. On the following restart, Christopher Bell spun and collected Stenhouse and Ryan Preece. In a two lap shootout, Larson got into Ryan Blaney and both fell back as Kyle Busch held off Kevin Harvick to win on his 36th birthday. NASCAR officials were criticized for their handling of an uncontrolled tire by Tyler Reddick's pit crew. They waited several laps until all the cars had pitted, then belatedly threw a caution, despite the tire presenting little apparent danger. This action disadvantaged several of the drivers.

Round 12: Goodyear 400

Brad Keselowski was awarded the pole for the second straight race. Aric Almirola slammed the wall after a flat tire while Kyle Busch spun while leading with a flat tire. Martin Truex Jr. dominated by leading the most laps and winning both stages. Cole Custer slammed the wall after contact with Anthony Alfredo while Kurt Busch got into the wall and caught fire after making contact with Bubba Wallace. Drivers split the final stage by pitting for green flag pit stops three different times. Kyle Larson was the only driver to challenge Truex for the lead as lapped traffic caused issues. Truex was able to pull away from Larson and win for his third win of the season.

Round 13: Drydene 400

Martin Truex Jr. started on the pole. Kyle Larson dominated, leading the most laps and winning both stages. Aric Almirola got a flat tire and got into the wall before catching fire. Anthony Alfredo spun after contact with Brad Keselowski and collected Ricky Stenhouse Jr. Alex Bowman took the lead from the dominant Larson and pulled away for his second win of the season followed by teammates Larson, Chase Elliott and William Byron, making Hendrick the first team since Roush-Fenway Racing to have all four cars finish 1, 2, 3, 4.

Round 14: EchoPark Texas Grand Prix

Tyler Reddick won his first career pole in qualifying. It began to rain on the first lap and all drivers pitted to change from slick tires to treaded rain tires. Kevin Harvick got heavy damage after making contact with Ryan Blaney, which also collected Christopher Bell and Bubba Wallace. Joey Logano won the first stage. In the second stage, the rain picked up, and the ensuing spray created visibility issues. In one incident, Martin Truex Jr. got into the back of Michael McDowell and then was rammed into by Cole Custer, severely damaging both cars, and causing Custer's car to catch on fire. Kyle Busch won the second stage. On a round of green flag pit stops, Kyle Larson passed Busch for the lead. Alex Bowman took the lead from Larson and was then passed by Chase Elliott. The race was red flagged again due to heavier rain and was called official with 14 laps to go. Elliott was awarded the win, giving Chevrolet its 800th win in NASCAR and Hendrick Motorsports its 268th win, tying Petty Enterprises for the most wins by team in NASCAR history.

Round 15: Coca-Cola 600

Kyle Larson won the pole in qualifying. Larson dominated, leading the most laps and winning the first two stages. Kurt Busch had an issue that sent him to the garage, but when he returned to the race, he blew his engine. Several drivers had tire problems including Joey Logano, Kevin Harvick, and Martin Truex Jr. Larson won the third stage and pulled away from teammate Chase Elliott to over a ten-second lead to win his second race of the season, earning the 269th win for Hendrick Motorsports, making them the winningest team in NASCAR history.

Round 16: Toyota/Save Mart 350

Kyle Larson was awarded the pole where he dominated and won both stages. William Byron spun and slammed into Kevin Harvick and collected Corey LaJoie. Cody Ware went through dirt and slammed into Ryan Preece as Matt DiBenedetto spun. Anthony Alfredo spun and collected Christopher Bell, sending the race to overtime. On the restart, Larson would hold off teammate Chase Elliott for his second straight win and third of the season for Hendrick Motorsports' 270th Cup win.

Exhibition: NASCAR All-Star Race

In the Open, Tyler Reddick was awarded the pole. Chris Buescher and Austin Cindric were penalized for beating the leader on the start and changing lanes before the start respectively. Bubba Wallace spun, bringing out a caution, and Buescher spun on the following restart after contact with Ricky Stenhouse Jr. Erik Jones and Daniel Suárez would both be involved in an accident soon after. Ross Chastain, who had to start at the back, passed Reddick and won the first stage to advance. Reddick held off Aric Almirola to win the second stage to advance. In the final 10 lap stage, Almirola held off Matt DiBenedetto to win the Open and advance. DiBenedetto advanced to the All-Star Race by winning the fan vote.

In the main event, Kyle Larson was awarded the pole. Christopher Bell spun on the first lap, but saved the car from hitting anything. The race was broken into six segments with Larson, Ryan Blaney, Alex Bowman, William Byron, and Chase Elliott winning the segments. Elliott's team won the pit road challenge for the final segment. In the first segment, Larson passed and held off Brad Keselowski for the $1 million and his second All-Star Race win.

Round 17: Ally 400

Aric Almirola won the pole in qualifying. Quin Houff got into the wall on the first lap. Ryan Blaney slammed the wall hard after losing his brakes. Chris Buescher got into the wall along with Justin Haley. Chase Elliott won the first stage while Kyle Larson won the second. Several had brake issues that caused them to get into the wall including Ryan Preece and Chase Briscoe. Larson was able to save enough fuel to hold off Ross Chastain for his third consecutive win and fourth of the season.

Round 18: Pocono Organics CBD 325

Kyle Larson was awarded the pole. Brad Keselowski, in an attempt to go under Cole Custer, hit Custer in the back and sent him into the wall. Kyle Busch would win the first stage. Ryan Newman and Ross Chastain both got in the wall in separate accidents. Kurt Busch would stay out and win the second stage. Larson passed Alex Bowman for the lead with four laps to go, and looked to have the win secured until his left front tire blew out entering the final corner. His car slammed into the outside wall, allowing Bowman to pass Larson back and win his third race of the season.

Round 19: Explore the Pocono Mountains 350

Owing to the top 20 finishers being inverted from the previous race to set the field, Chris Buescher started on the pole. Martin Truex Jr. won the first stage while William Byron won the second stage. The race came down to fuel mileage. Brad Keselowski had to pit from the lead, giving the lead to Byron. Byron then had to pit with three laps to go, handing the lead to Denny Hamlin. Hamlin pit coming to the white flag, giving the lead to Kyle Busch, who was also suffering from a transmission issue, had enough fuel for his second win of the season over Kyle Larson, who finished second despite suffering heating issues.

Round 20: Jockey Made in America 250 presented by Kwik Trip

William Byron won the pole in qualifying. Early, Ryan Preece suffered a blown engine and Daniel Suárez came to a stop on the track due to a broken transmission. Bryon won the first stage while Tyler Reddick won the second stage. At the beginning of the third stage, Austin Cindric was leading and suffered a gearing issue. Chase Elliott would take the lead from Matt DiBenedetto and hold off Christopher Bell for his second win of the season and his seventh road course win, putting him third behind Tony Stewart (8) and Jeff Gordon (9).

Round 21: Quaker State 400

Chase Elliott was awarded the pole. Ricky Stenhouse Jr. spun into the wall and collected Daniel Suárez. Kyle Busch won the first stage while Kurt Busch won the second stage. The race went under a red flag for 20 minutes to repair damage to the track surface. Kurt and Kyle traded the lead with lapped traffic causing problems. After Kyle got into the wall, Kurt was able to pull away and win the race.

Round 22: Foxwoods Resort Casino 301

Kyle Busch was awarded the pole. During the first few laps it began to rain and caused Busch to slam into the wall and others spun including Martin Truex Jr., and Alex Bowman. Busch would be unable to continue the race. The race was red flagged due to rain. When the race resumed, Joey Logano was penalized two laps for a crew member working on the car under the red flag. Bubba Wallace spun with a flat tire as Ryan Blaney won the first stage. Kevin Harvick would dominate, but Brad Keselowski won the second stage. In the closing laps, several laps were taken off of the distance due to darkness looming. Aric Almirola would take the lead from Matt DiBenedetto and hold off a charging Christopher Bell for the win, qualifying for the playoffs being 27th in points and needing a win to qualify.

Round 23: Go Bowling at The Glen

Brad Keselowski was awarded the pole. Keselowski spun early while leading as teammate Joey Logano won the first stage. Martin Truex Jr. would win the second stage and led the most laps. Keselowski returned to the lead, but spun again and collected Logano, causing small damage to both cars. Kyle Larson made contact with Christopher Bell, sending him spinning. Larson then took the lead from Truex and held off teammate Chase Elliott for his fifth win and second road win of the season.

Round 24: Verizon 200 at the Brickyard

William Byron won the pole in qualifying for the first Cup race on the Indianapolis Road Course. Pit strategy came into play for the start of the race, allowing Tyler Reddick to win both stages while Martin Truex Jr. suffered tire issues and Brad Keselowski spun into the wall. Late in the race, Byron spun with Kyle Busch while Joey Logano and Daniel Suárez both got into the tire barrier. On the restart, Reddick made contact with teammate Austin Dillon and collected Cole Custer and Alex Bowman. In overtime, Chase Briscoe was penalized for not stopping after missing a corner while battling Denny Hamlin for the lead and then spun Hamlin (Briscoe said after the race that he wasn't told about the penalty.) A. J. Allmendinger took advantage and took the lead and held off Ryan Blaney for his second career Cup victory and the first Cup win for Kaulig Racing.

Round 25: FireKeepers Casino 400

Kyle Larson started on pole. Chase Elliott won the first stage while Kyle Busch won the second stage. At the end of the second stage, Brad Keselowski made contact with Austin Dillon and sent Dillon spinning into the wall, ending his race. In the final stage, drivers had different pit strategies, with William Byron gaining the lead. A caution came out for rain with 21 laps to go and for a multicar wreck with 14 laps to go. Following a restart with eight laps to go, Ryan Blaney gained the lead and held off Byron and Kyle Larson to win the race, his second win of the season.

Round 26: Coke Zero Sugar 400

Kyle Larson was awarded the pole for the race. Chase Elliott won the first stage while Joey Logano won the second stage. Logano led the most laps in the race. Several lead changes occurred and the race was red-flagged due to a multicar wreck late in the race. In overtime, Ryan Blaney took the lead and won the race as a nine-car wreck occurred in turn 3 on the final lap. Blaney scored his second consecutive win and third win of the season. Larson won the regular season championship while Tyler Reddick clinched the final spot in the playoffs.

=== NASCAR Cup Series Playoffs ===
Round 27: Cook Out Southern 500

Ryan Blaney started the race from the pole position. Early in the race, playoff driver Alex Bowman scraped the wall while playoff driver Michael McDowell was taken out of the race after hitting the wall. Denny Hamlin won the first stage of the race. In the second stage, Austin Dillon and playoff driver Kyle Busch made contact, with Busch hitting the wall and going to the garage, ending his night. Kyle Larson won the second stage of the race. Several other playoff drivers had trouble during the race including William Byron, who hit the wall after cutting a tire, Chase Elliott, who hit the wall after going three-wide with Bubba Wallace and Christopher Bell, and Blaney, who spun late in the race. In the closing laps, Hamlin was leading Larson. On the final lap, Larson tapped Hamlin, but Hamlin blocked the top line to win the race, his first win of the season, to move on to the next round of the playoffs.

Round 28: Federated Auto Parts 400

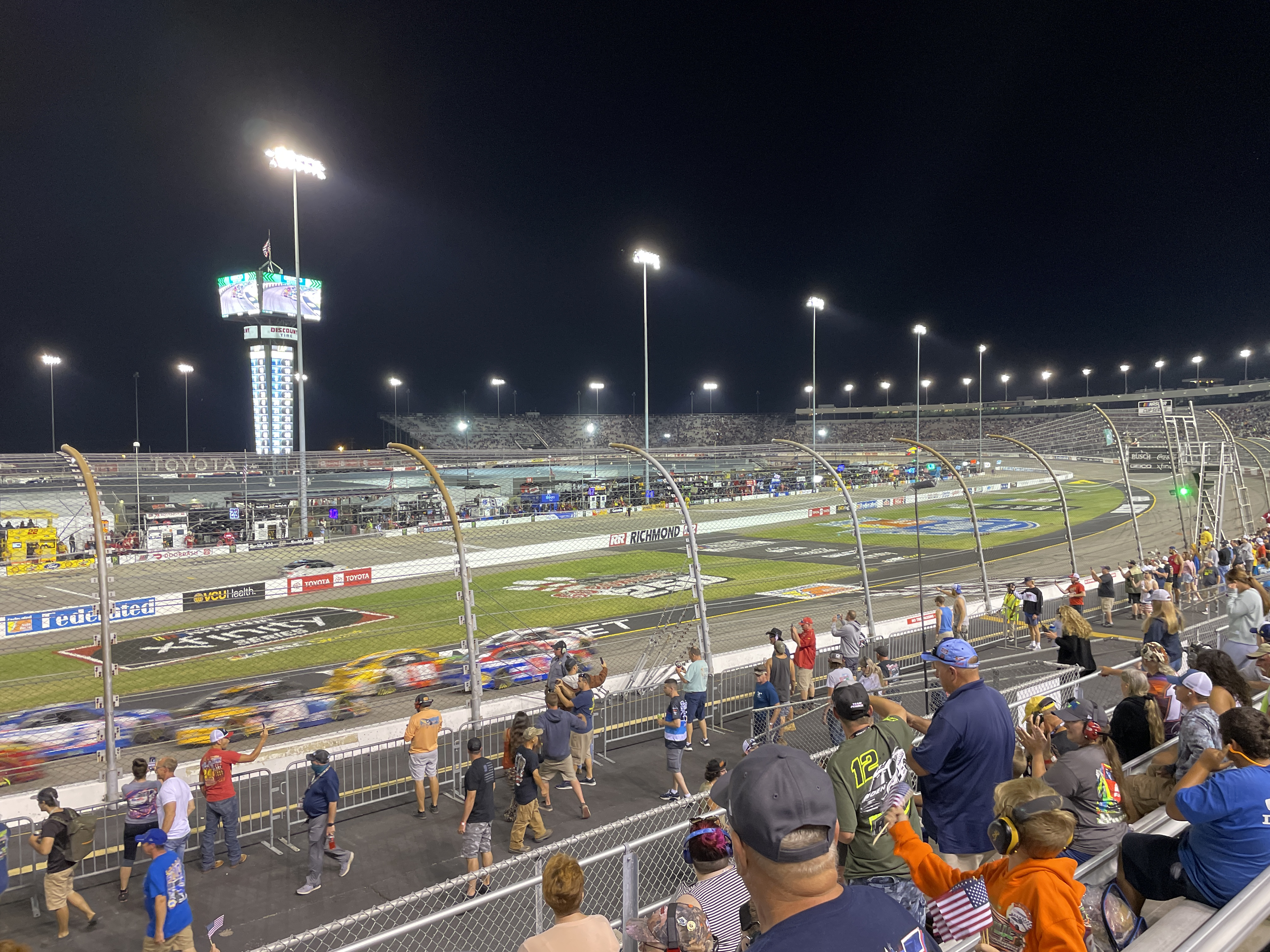
The Federated Auto Parts 400 at Richmond Raceway in September

Kyle Larson was awarded the pole for the race, but dropped to the rear at the start. At the start of the race, Martin Truex Jr. was penalized for crossing the start/finish line ahead of leader Denny Hamlin. Early in the race, Kurt Busch cut a tire and slammed the wall. Hamlin won both stages and led the most laps in the race. Kyle Busch was leading late in the race but was penalized for speeding on pit road during a round of green-flag pit stops. Truex Jr. gained the lead and went on to win the race, advancing to the next round of the playoffs. Larson also advanced to the next round of the playoffs on points.

Round 29: Bass Pro Shops NRA Night Race

Martin Truex Jr. earned the pole position for the start of the race, where he led the first five laps. Denny Hamlin won stage one after passing Kyle Larson on lap 90. A red flag occurred for nearly eight minutes following a turn 4 incident that involved four vehicles on lap 221. Larson led at the end of stage two. On lap 464, Chase Elliott was forced to pit from the lead when he had a flat tire from damage he received when Kevin Harvick got into his rear quarter panel. When back on the track, Elliott attempted to retaliate by getting into the side of then race leader Harvick and then running Harvick's preferred line, thus slowing him down. Larson was able to pass Harvick on lap 497, and secure his 12th overall Cup Series win. Following the race, Harvick and Elliott bumped cars on pit road and confronted each other when they eventually parked. Elliott said, "It's something [Harvick] does all the time. He runs into your left side constantly at other tracks and sometimes it does cut down your left side (tires), other times it doesn't." The argument continued for several minutes continuing inside Elliott's hauler. Michael McDowell, Kurt Busch, Tyler Reddick, and Aric Almirola were eliminated from the Playoffs.

Round 30: South Point 400

Kyle Larson started on the pole for the race. Four cars (#10, #19, #24, #66) dropped to the rear for multiple inspection failures. Larson won stage one. Following an incident with Joey Gase only five laps into the run, most cars pitted with the four Hendrick Motorsports cars choosing to stay out. The Hendrick cars thought they were on the outside of the fuel window, but due to an extended caution the cars that pitted were able to make it to stage two. This forced the Hendrick cars to pit under green, forcing them a lap down. Chase Elliott was able to un-lap himself, and William Byron earned the lucky dog pass. Denny Hamlin won stage two and went on to win the race, beating Elliott by 0.442 seconds.

Round 31: YellaWood 500

Denny Hamlin was the pole sitter for the race. The race was forced to be delayed until the following day due to rain. The next day, NASCAR would be able to get the race started at 1PMET, 12 PM local time. Chris Buescher won Stage 1 for his 2nd stage win of the season and the first since February at Homestead-Miami Speedway. At the end of Stage 2, rain hit the area. And the race was past its halfway point (Lap 94), so whoever was leading could possibly win the race. Bubba Wallace was leading when the rain hit. After a long red flag, NASCAR declared the race official and Wallace won his first career Cup Series race along with Stage 2 of the race. It was also the first win for 23XI Racing, the new team co-owned by Denny Hamlin and Michael Jordan which debuted this season.

Round 32: Bank of America Roval 400

Denny Hamlin was the pole sitter for the race. Chase Elliot won Stage 1 and Kyle Busch won Stage 2. Despite dealing with an issue with the alternator belt during the race, Kyle Larson was able to overcome it to pass Hamlin with 8 laps to win the race. The victory made Larson the first Cup driver in NASCAR history to win three different road courses in a single season (Sonoma, Watkins Glen and the Charlotte Roval). Larson was also the first driver to sweep the Charlotte races since Kasey Kahne did it in 2006. William Byron, Alex Bowman, Christopher Bell and Kevin Harvick were eliminated from the playoffs.

Round 33: Autotrader EchoPark Automotive 500

Kyle Larson was the pole sitter for the race. Kyle Busch won Stage 1 and Larson won Stage 2. Multiple playoff drivers suffered issues late in the race, with Joey Logano blowing an engine and Denny Hamlin and Martin Truex Jr. involved in wrecks. Larson would lead 257 of the 334 laps to win his eighth race of the season and be the first to advance into the Championship 4.

Round 34: Hollywood Casino 400

Kyle Larson started from the pole position. Larson won Stage 1 and William Byron won Stage 2. Kyle Busch and Brad Keselowski were involved in incidents during the race while Ryan Blaney wrecked out of the race with 44 laps to go. Larson won the race, his third consecutive win and ninth for the season. He became the second driver after Joey Logano in 2015 to win three consecutive "post-season" races. He is the fourth driver in NASCAR "post-season" history to win four races in the post-season, following Jimmie Johnson (3 times), Tony Stewart (won 5 in 2011), and Martin Truex Jr. (2017). Larson also became the first driver to win three straight points-paying races twice in the same season since Dale Earnhardt did it in 1987.

Round 35: Xfinity 500

Kyle Larson was the pole sitter. Chase Elliott led 289 laps and won Stages 1 and 2, but a spin-out late in the race pushed him out of contention to win the race and he finished 16th, but he was still able to advance to the Championship 4 based on points. Late in the race, Alex Bowman wrecked leader Denny Hamlin. Bowman won the race for his fourth victory of the season. Martin Truex Jr. and Denny Hamlin also advanced to the Championship 4 based on points. Kyle Busch, Ryan Blaney, Brad Keselowski and Joey Logano were eliminated from the playoffs.

Round 36: NASCAR Cup Series Championship Race

Kyle Larson won the pole position for the race. The majority of the race saw the Championship 4 drivers in the front, with Martin Truex Jr. winning Stage 1 and Larson winning Stage 2. With 60 laps to go, Truex made a pit stop as rookie Anthony Alfredo wrecked, but Truex was able to exit pit road on the lead lap before the caution came out. Truex took the lead when the other Championship 4 drivers pitted during caution. Truex was leading the race with 30 laps to go when the caution came out for the wrecked David Starr. In the final pit stop of the season, Hamlin's pit crew conducted a 12.1 second pit stop that would have allowed Hamlin to exit pit road with the lead. But with Larson in the first pit stall and Larson's pit crew conducting a 11.8 second pit stop (the second fastest time for the crew in the season), Larson was able to exit pit road with the lead. When green flag racing resumed with 24 laps to go, Larson got a good jump to clear the other drivers, but Truex was able to follow close behind. Despite some close challenges from Truex in the final laps, Larson held on to win his tenth race of the season and his first career NASCAR Cup Championship. Truex, Hamlin and Elliott would finish 2nd, 3rd and 5th respectively in the race to finish in the point standings 2nd, 3rd and 4th respectively.

== Results and standings ==
=== Race results ===
No.	Race	Pole position	Most laps led	Winning driver	Manufacturer	Report
	Busch Clash	Ryan Blaney	Denny Hamlin	Kyle Busch	Toyota	Report
	Bluegreen Vacations Duel 1	Alex Bowman	Aric Almirola	Aric Almirola	Ford	Report
	Bluegreen Vacations Duel 2	William Byron	William Byron	Austin Dillon	Chevrolet	Report
1	Daytona 500	Alex Bowman	Denny Hamlin	Michael McDowell	Ford	Report
2	O'Reilly Auto Parts 253	Chase Elliott	Chase Elliott	Christopher Bell	Toyota	Report
3	Dixie Vodka 400	Denny Hamlin	William Byron	William Byron	Chevrolet	Report
4	Pennzoil 400	Kevin Harvick	Kyle Larson	Kyle Larson	Chevrolet	Report
5	Instacart 500	Brad Keselowski	Joey Logano	Martin Truex Jr.	Toyota	Report
6	Folds of Honor QuikTrip 500	Denny Hamlin	Kyle Larson	Ryan Blaney	Ford	Report
7	Food City Dirt Race	Kyle Larson	Martin Truex Jr.	Joey Logano	Ford	Report
8	Blue-Emu Maximum Pain Relief 500	Joey Logano	Denny Hamlin	Martin Truex Jr.	Toyota	Report
9	Toyota Owners 400	Martin Truex Jr.	Denny Hamlin	Alex Bowman	Chevrolet	Report
10	GEICO 500	Denny Hamlin	Denny Hamlin	Brad Keselowski	Ford	Report
11	Buschy McBusch Race 400	Brad Keselowski	Kyle Larson	Kyle Busch	Toyota	Report
12	Goodyear 400	Brad Keselowski	Martin Truex Jr.	Martin Truex Jr.	Toyota	Report
13	Drydene 400	Martin Truex Jr.	Kyle Larson	Alex Bowman	Chevrolet	Report
14	EchoPark Texas Grand Prix	Tyler Reddick	Joey Logano	Chase Elliott	Chevrolet	Report
15	Coca-Cola 600	Kyle Larson	Kyle Larson	Kyle Larson	Chevrolet	Report
16	Toyota/Save Mart 350	Kyle Larson	Kyle Larson	Kyle Larson	Chevrolet	Report
	NASCAR All Star Open	Tyler Reddick	Tyler Reddick	Aric Almirola	Ford	Report
	NASCAR All-Star Race	Kyle Larson	William Byron	Kyle Larson	Chevrolet	Report
17	Ally 400	Aric Almirola	Kyle Larson	Kyle Larson	Chevrolet	Report
18	Pocono Organics CBD 325	Kyle Larson	Kyle Busch	Alex Bowman	Chevrolet	Report
19	Explore the Pocono Mountains 350	Chris Buescher	Brad Keselowski	Kyle Busch	Toyota	Report
20	Jockey Made in America 250	William Byron	Chase Elliott	Chase Elliott	Chevrolet	Report
21	Quaker State 400	Chase Elliott	Kurt Busch	Kurt Busch	Chevrolet	Report
22	Foxwoods Resort Casino 301	Kyle Busch	Kevin Harvick	Aric Almirola	Ford	Report
23	Go Bowling at The Glen	Brad Keselowski	Martin Truex Jr.	Kyle Larson	Chevrolet	Report
24	Verizon 200 at the Brickyard	William Byron	Kyle Larson	A. J. Allmendinger	Chevrolet	Report
25	FireKeepers Casino 400	Kyle Larson	Kyle Larson	Ryan Blaney	Ford	Report
26	Coke Zero Sugar 400	Kyle Larson	Joey Logano	Ryan Blaney	Ford	Report
NASCAR Cup Series Playoffs
Round of 16
27	Cook Out Southern 500	Ryan Blaney	Kyle Larson	Denny Hamlin	Toyota	Report
28	Federated Auto Parts 400	Kyle Larson	Denny Hamlin	Martin Truex Jr.	Toyota	Report
29	Bass Pro Shops Night Race	Martin Truex Jr.	Kyle Larson	Kyle Larson	Chevrolet	Report
Round of 12
30	South Point 400	Kyle Larson	Denny Hamlin	Denny Hamlin	Toyota	Report
31	YellaWood 500	Denny Hamlin	Kevin Harvick	Bubba Wallace	Toyota	Report
32	Bank of America Roval 400	Denny Hamlin	William Byron	Kyle Larson	Chevrolet	Report
Round of 8
33	Autotrader EchoPark Automotive 500	Kyle Larson	Kyle Larson	Kyle Larson	Chevrolet	Report
34	Hollywood Casino 400	Kyle Larson	Kyle Larson	Kyle Larson	Chevrolet	Report
35	Xfinity 500	Kyle Larson	Chase Elliott	Alex Bowman	Chevrolet	Report
Championship 4
36	NASCAR Cup Series Championship Race	Kyle Larson	Kyle Larson	Kyle Larson	Chevrolet	Report

=== Drivers' championship ===
(key) Bold – Pole position awarded by time. Italics – Pole position by competition-based formula. * – Most laps led. ^{1} – Stage 1 winner. ^{2} – Stage 2 winner. ^{3} – Stage 3 winner. (Note: Stage 3 Winner only for Coca-Cola 600 and Daytona 500 qualifying race, but no playoff point at Daytona)^{1–10} - Regular season top 10 finishers.
. – Eliminated after Round of 16 . – Eliminated after Round of 12 . – Eliminated after Round of 8

Pos.	Driver	DAY	DRC	HOM	LVS	PHO	ATL	BRD	MAR	RCH	TAL	KAN	DAR	DOV	COA	CLT	SON	NSH	POC	POC	ROA	ATL	NHA	GLN	IRC	MCH	DAY	DAR	RCH	BRI	LVS	TAL	ROV	TEX	KAN	MAR	PHO	Pts.	Stage	Bonus
1	Kyle Larson	10	30	4	1*^{2}	7	2*^{12}	29	5	18	40	19*^{2}	2	2*^{12}	2	**1***^{123}	1*^{12}	1*^{2}	9	2	16	18	7	1	3*	3*	20	2*^{2}	6	1*^{2}	10^{1}	37	1	1*^{2}	1*^{1}	14	**1***^{2}	5040	–	65^{1}
2	Martin Truex Jr.	25	12	3	6	1	9	19*^{1}	1	5	31	6	1*^{12}	19	35	29	3	22	18	11^{1}	9	3	12	3*^{2}	15	10	29	4	1	7	4	12	29	25	7	4	2^{1}	5035	–	29^{7}
3	Denny Hamlin	5*^{12}	3^{2}	11	4	3	4	3	3*	2*^{12}	32*	12	5	7	14	7	8	21	4	14	5	13	10	5	23	5	13	1^{1}	2*^{12}	9^{1}	1*^{2}	7	5	11	5	24	3	5034	–	30^{2}
4	Chase Elliott	2	21*^{1}	14	13	5	38	10	2	12	24	5	7	3	1	2	2	39	12	27	1*	7	18	2	4	8^{1}	8^{1}	31	4	25	2	18	12^{1}	7	2	16*^{12}	5	5032	–	22^{3}
NASCAR Cup Series Playoffs cut-off
Pos.	Driver	DAY	DRC	HOM	LVS	PHO	ATL	BRD	MAR	RCH	TAL	KAN	DAR	DOV	COA	CLT	SON	NSH	POC	POC	ROA	ATL	NHA	GLN	IRC	MCH	DAY	DAR	RCH	BRI	LVS	TAL	ROV	TEX	KAN	MAR	PHO	Pts.	Stage	Bonus
5	Kevin Harvick	4	6	5	20	6	10	15	9	24	4	2	6	6	37	10	22	5	8	4	27	11	6*	8	14	14	15	5	8	2	9	8*	33	5	3	12	8	2361	57	2^{9}
6	Brad Keselowski	13	5	16	2^{1}	4	28	11	33	14	1	3	24	16	19	11	15	23	10	3*	13	10	3^{2}	35	24	9	33	7	13	6	7	2	20	4	17	3	10	2354	20	8^{10}
7	Ryan Blaney	30	15	29	5	10^{1}	1	8	11^{12}	11	9	21	8	12	17	13	10	37	5	6	20	5	5^{1}	14	2	1	1	22	10	4	5	15	9	6	37	11	4	2350	26	24^{6}
8	Joey Logano	12	2	25	9	2*^{2}	15	1^{2}	6	3	39	17	13	5	3*^{1}	17	4	10	7	10	15	19	4	22^{1}	34	33	23*^{2}	8	5	11	11	3	7	30	9	10	11	2336	4	13^{8}
9	Kyle Busch	14	35	10	3	25	5	17	10	8	18	1^{1}	3	27	10^{2}	3	5	11	2*^{1}	1	3	2^{1}	37	4	20	7^{2}	34	35	9	21	3	27	4^{2}	8^{1}	28	2	7	2318	23	23^{4}
10	William Byron	26	33	1*^{2}	8	8	8	6	4	7	2	9	4	4	11	4	35	3	3	12^{2}	**33**^{1}	20	21	6	**33**	2	37	34	19	3	18	36	11*	2	6^{2}	5	17	2306	65	14^{5}
11	Kurt Busch	22	4	8	19	15	39	16	21	13	35	15	35	13	27	38	6	8^{1}	6^{2}	20	4	1*^{2}	16	13	6	4	12	6	37	19	8	4	25	16	4	7	16	2297	60	8
12	Christopher Bell	16	1	20	7	9	21	34	7	4	17	28	14	21	38	24	24	9	17	32	2	8	2	7	36	13	32	20	3	29	24	5	8	3	8	17	9	2279	10	5
13	Tyler Reddick	27	38	2	22	29	26	7	8	20	7	7	12	8	**9**	9	19	18	11	9	8^{2}	6	13	10	21^{12}	29	5	18	15	12	6	39	2	9	22	18	19	2250	34	3
14	Alex Bowman	**35**	10	9	27	13	3	22	34	1	38	18	17	1	8	5	9	14	1	7	22	4	9	20	17	16	7	26	12	5	22	38	10	33	11	1	18	2240	23	15
15	Aric Almirola	34	17	30	38	11	20	36	20	6	15	29	37	37	26	22	27	**4**	16	16	14	23	1	16	19	17	14	16	14	18	19	26	24	18	26	6	6	2215	13	5
16	Michael McDowell	1	8	6	17	23	19	12	31	27	3	13	27	25	7	20	28	16	19	17	30	27	25	21	30	20	39	37	28	24	21	17	16	17	16	26	24	2152	2	5
17	Austin Dillon	3	34	12	12	17	6	21	14	10	8	10	16	14	12	6	13	12	21	13	11	12	17	15	31	36	17	10	11	15	13	11	15	14	10	13	15	935	113	–
18	Matt DiBenedetto	33	37	28	16	14	11	13	12	9	5^{1}	4	19	24	23	18	23	24	32	18	10	9	11	11	5	6	25	23	18	10	12	35	6	13	23	15	12	775	49	1
19	Chris Buescher	31	11	19^{1}	14	18	7	14	13	25	21	8	9	17	13	8	16	36	20	19	18	16	29	17	12	15	40	9	24	23	25	6^{1}	3	21	12	9	25	771	57	2
20	Ross Chastain	7	39	17	23	19	14	35	17	15	16	14	15	15	4	37	7	2	33	26	7	21	8	12	29	35	18	3	7	14	23	33	23	28	13	27	14	729	63	–
21	Bubba Wallace	17	26	22	28	16	16	27	16	26	19^{2}	26	21	11	39	14	14	20	14	5	24	14	26	23	13	19	2	21	32	16	16	1^{2}	14	32	14	25	39	699	56	6
22	Ricky Stenhouse Jr.	18	18	13	11	12	12	2	15	17	33	34	20	20	22	12	37	6	15	38	12	37	15	19	11	12	22	17	23	20	17	16	21	34	24	19	36	666	40	–
23	Chase Briscoe **(R)**	19	32	18	21	22	23	20	27	22	11	20	11	35	6	23	17	31	24	21	6	15	27	9	26	11	21	19	16	13	14	14	22	15	19	22	35	655	30	–
24	Erik Jones	39	14	27	10	20	24	9	30	19	27	25	18	22	16	16	11	19	22	31	19	24	19	27	7	18	11	32	21	8	26	9	17	12	29	8	22	641	14	–
25	Daniel Suárez	36	16	15	26	21	17	4	32	16	23	11	23	9	33	15	12	7	13	15	36	36	20	31	37	22	19	13	17	22	15	23	13	10	15	28	21	634	30	–
26	Cole Custer	11	13	23	25	31	18	24	18	23	10	24	36	10	36	21	20	30	38	24	17	17	14	18	25	23	24	11	22	28	29	13	18	19	18	23	13	575	8	–
27	Ryan Preece	6	9	21	15	26	25	18	36	29	14	32	25	18	15	26	21	32	23	8	40	25	22	28	35	21	4	12	25	17	28	32	19	36	21	36	20	557	35	–
28	Ryan Newman	38	20	7	18	28	13	5	19	30	13	16	10	23	24	27	33	13	37	22	32	28	24	25	10	24	3	14	20	38	20	21	39	35	27	32	23	546	9	–
29	Corey LaJoie	9	31	36	37	27	29	38	37	21	22	27	22	26	20	19	18	15	36	23	21	22	23	24	16		16	15	29	26	30	22	35	20	25	21	32	448	15	–
30	Anthony Alfredo **(R)**	32	22	24	24	37	27	39	26	31	12	23	26	28	18	25	31	17	26	34	37	26	32	26	38	34	26	24	26	35	27	10	26	29	38	20	34	352	1	–
31	Quin Houff	29	40	35	33	32	33	25	24	34	37	37	30	29	34	32	36	38	31	33	34	35	35	32	22	30	38	30	35	34	34	19	30	31	35	34	37	176	–	–
32	James Davison		23	37		33	32		22	33			31	33	29	33	25		28	30	28		36	37	32			36		33		34						117	–	–
33	Jamie McMurray	8																																				30	–	–
34	Scott Heckert		28														26																31					26	–	–
35	Joey Hand																																27					10	–	–
36	Mike Marlar							31																														6	–	–
37	Chris Windom							33																														4	–	–
38	David Ragan	37																																				4	–	–
39	R. C. Enerson																							34														3	–	–
40	Shane Golobic							37																														3	–	–
41	Ryan Eversley																				39																	2	–	–
42	Derrike Cope	40																																				1	–	–
Ineligible for driver points
Pos.	Driver	DAY	DRC	HOM	LVS	PHO	ATL	BRD	MAR	RCH	TAL	KAN	DAR	DOV	COA	CLT	SON	NSH	POC	POC	ROA	ATL	NHA	GLN	IRC	MCH	DAY	DAR	RCH	BRI	LVS	TAL	ROV	TEX	KAN	MAR	PHO	Pts.	Stage	Bonus
	A. J. Allmendinger		7												5						29				1								38							
	Justin Haley		24	26	29	24	30		35	38	30	30	28		40	28		35	27		25	29	28	29	8	25	6	25	27	36	32	20	37	37	39	31	26			
	Kaz Grala	28									6																35													
	Austin Cindric	15					22			28		22			25						38				9															
	B. J. McLeod	23		34	30	30	34		29	32	25	31	32	36		31		28	30	29		30	30			28	9	27	30	37	33	30		22	30	29	27			
	Josh Bilicki	24	36	33	35	35	37	30	23	37	36	39	33	34	30	35	29	26	34	35	23	34	34	33	18	31	10	28	36	31	36	31	28	26	33	35	30			
	Ty Dillon	DNQ	19					26							21						26																			
	Joey Gase	20			34		35				34	35						29								37	31	29	33		37	25		39	32	38	29			
	Harrison Burton										20																													
	Parker Kligerman																																		20					
	Cody Ware	21	25	32	32	36	31	32	28	36	28	36	34	31	32	30	34		25	28	31	33	31		40	27	28	33			31	28	36	38	31	30	28			
	David Starr															36		34									27			32				23	34		33			
	Stewart Friesen							23																																
	Garrett Smithley	DNQ	27	31	31	34				35		33		32	28	34	32	25	29	36		31	33	36	28	32	30		31	30	35	29	34	24		33	31			
	Landon Cassill																										36					24								
	J. J. Yeley							28	25		26		29					27											34	27	38									
	Justin Allgaier																			25												40								
	Josh Berry													30												26														
	Timmy Hill	DNQ	29	38	36	38	36				29								35	37					27								32	27		37	38			
	Kyle Tilley														31						35			30																
	Ben Rhodes																30																							
	Bayley Currey																					32																		
	Chad Finchum																	33																	40					
	Ryan Ellis																																		36					
	Matt Mills											38																												
	Andy Lally																								39															
	Noah Gragson	DNQ																																						
Pos.	Driver	DAY	DRC	HOM	LVS	PHO	ATL	BRD	MAR	RCH	TAL	KAN	DAR	DOV	COA	CLT	SON	NSH	POC	POC	ROA	ATL	NHA	GLN	IRC	MCH	DAY	DAR	RCH	BRI	LVS	TAL	ROV	TEX	KAN	MAR	PHO	Pts.	Stage	Bonus

=== Manufacturers' championship ===
Pos	Manufacturer	Wins	Points
1	Chevrolet	19	1336
2	Toyota	10	1239
3	Ford	7	1236

== See also ==
- 2021 NASCAR Xfinity Series
- 2021 NASCAR Camping World Truck Series
- 2021 ARCA Menards Series
- 2021 ARCA Menards Series East
- 2021 ARCA Menards Series West
- 2021 NASCAR Whelen Modified Tour
- 2021 NASCAR Pinty's Series
- 2021 NASCAR Whelen Euro Series
- 2021 CARS Tour
- 2021 eNASCAR iRacing Pro Invitational Series
- 2021 SRX Series
- 2021 Southern Modified Auto Racing Teams season
