= Ben Beshore =

NASCAR crew chief

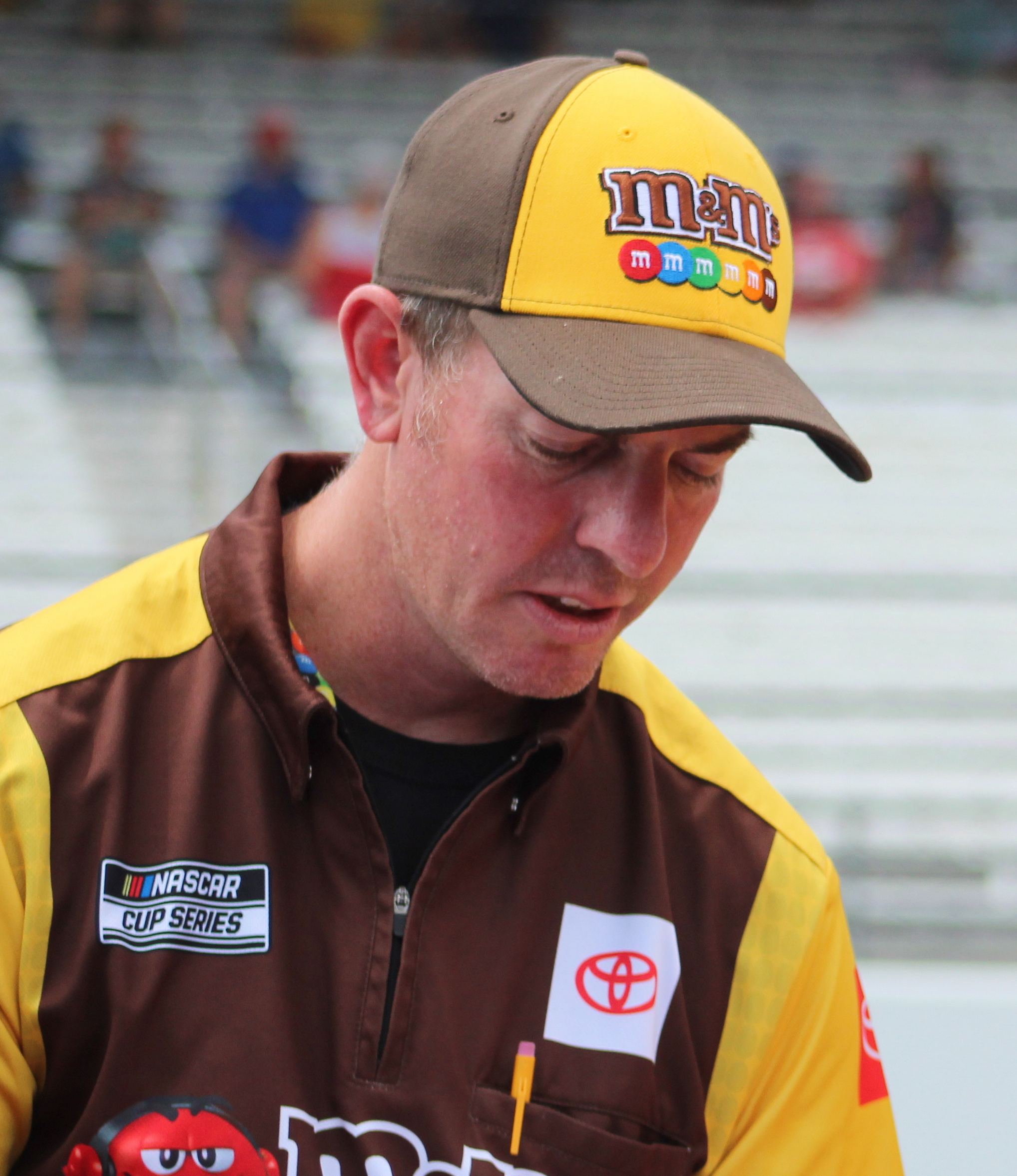
- Beshore at Indianapolis Motor Speedway in 2022

Personal information
- Born: Benjamin Edwin Beshore; October 21, 1981 (age 45) York, Pennsylvania, U.S.
- Education: Virginia Tech
- Years active: 2004–present

Sport
- Sport: NASCAR
- Position: Crew chief
- Team: Legacy Motor Club

Benjamin Edwin Beshore (born October 21, 1981) is an American NASCAR crew chief at Legacy Motor Club. He is currently the crew chief for Erik Jones of the No. 43 Toyota Camry in the NASCAR Cup Series. He had previously been with Joe Gibbs Racing.

== Career ==
Beshore began his career in NASCAR working for smaller teams, eventually joining Brewco Motorsports as a jack-of-all trades, working as the car chief, engineer, and rear-tire changer for the #66 car in the NASCAR Busch Series. After moving over to Roush Fenway Racing in 2007 as a race engineer, he joined Joe Gibbs Racing in 2014, serving as the race engineer for Kyle Busch in the NASCAR Cup Series from 2015 to 2018. He served as the interim crew chief on Busch's car for three races in 2017 when regular crew chief Adam Stevens was suspended after a wheel came off the car following a pit stop at Dover International Speedway. Beshore himself was later suspended one race for lug nut infractions suffered at Sonoma Raceway, leading to Busch's third crew chief in five races.

Beshore was named a crew chief for Joe Gibbs Racing in the NASCAR Xfinity Series in 2019, where he worked with multiple drivers in the program's No. 18 car. He moved over to the No. 20 car for the 2020 season, working with Harrison Burton. The duo won four races in 2020 as Burton won the series' Rookie of the Year award despite Beshore having missed a race due to possible exposure to COVID-19.

Beshore was promoted to the NASCAR Cup Series before the 2021 season to work with Busch once again, this time as his crew chief. The duo won their first race of the season, the exhibition Busch Clash at the Daytona International Speedway in a shocking last-lap pass as Busch passed drivers Ryan Blaney and Chase Elliott who wrecked coming out of the last turn. Beshore earned his first career points-paying Cup Series race in May when Busch won at Kansas Speedway on his 36th birthday, also extending a record-tying streak of 17 consecutive seasons with a win for the driver. On October 10, 2021, NASCAR announced that Beshore would be suspended for the Texas race after the No. 18 had two loose lug nuts following the race at the Charlotte Roval.

On October 18, 2022, Beshore was suspended for four races for a loose wheel violation at Las Vegas.

On December 8, 2022, it was announced that Beshore would move back to the Xfinity Series for the 2023 season, this time as crew chief for John Hunter Nemechek in the No. 20 car.

After nearly a decade with Joe Gibbs Racing, it was announced on November 13, 2023, that Beshore would return to the Cup Series with Legacy Motor Club's No. 42 car with Nemechek in 2024.

Upon the departure of Dave Elenz from LMC on October 8, 2024, it was announced that Beshore would move over to the 43 team to partner with Erik Jones for the remainder of the 2024 NASCAR Cup Series season. On November 19, 2024, LMC announced that Beshore would crew chief the 43 team with Jones during the 2025 season.
