= 2021 Bluegreen Vacations Duels =

NASCAR Bluegreen Vacations Duels

Race details
- Date: February 11, 2021
- Location: Daytona International Speedway; Daytona Beach, Florida
- Course: Permanent racing facility 2.5 mi (4 km)
- Distance: Race 1: 60 laps, 150 mi (240 km); Race 2: 63 laps, 157.5 mi (252 km)
- Avg Speed: Race 1: 191.966 miles per hour (308.939 km/h); Race 2: 158.071 miles per hour (254.391 km/h)

Race 1
- Pole position: Alex Bowman
- Most laps led: Aric Almirola (52)
- Winner: Aric Almirola

Race 2
- Pole position: William Byron
- Most laps led: William Byron (34)
- Winner: Austin Dillon

Television
- Network: FS1 & MRN
- Announcers: Mike Joy, Jeff Gordon and Clint Bowyer (Television); Alex Hayden, Jeff Striegle and Rusty Wallace (Booth); Dave Moody (1 & 2), Mike Bagley (Backstretch) and Kyle Rickey (3 & 4) (Turns) (Radio)

The 2021 Bluegreen Vacations Duels were a pair of NASCAR Cup Series stock car races held on February 11, 2021, at Daytona International Speedway in Daytona Beach, Florida. Both contested over 60 laps, they were the qualifying races for the 2021 Daytona 500.

== Report ==
=== Background ===
Daytona International Speedway, where the races were held.

Daytona International Speedway is one of six superspeedways to hold NASCAR races, the others being Michigan International Speedway, Auto Club Speedway, Indianapolis Motor Speedway, Pocono Raceway and Talladega Superspeedway. The standard track at Daytona International Speedway is a four–turn superspeedway that is 2.5-mile (4.0 km) long. The track's turns are banked at 31 degrees, while the front stretch, the location of the finish line, is banked at 18 degrees.

== Qualifying ==
Alex Bowman scored the pole for the race with a time of 47.056 and a speed of 191.261 mph (307.805 km/h).

=== Qualifying results ===
Pos	No.	Driver	Team	Manufacturer	Time
1	48	Alex Bowman	Hendrick Motorsports	Chevrolet	47.056
2	24	William Byron	Hendrick Motorsports	Chevrolet	47.314
3	10	Aric Almirola	Stewart-Haas Racing	Ford	47.324
4	23	Bubba Wallace	23XI Racing	Toyota	47.474
5	47	Ricky Stenhouse Jr.	JTG Daugherty Racing	Chevrolet	47.477
6	4	Kevin Harvick	Stewart-Haas Racing	Ford	47.489
7	20	Christopher Bell	Joe Gibbs Racing	Toyota	47.573
8	37	Ryan Preece	JTG Daugherty Racing	Chevrolet	47.585
9	3	Austin Dillon	Richard Childress Racing	Chevrolet	47.631
10	99	Daniel Suárez	Trackhouse Racing Team	Chevrolet	47.636
11	11	Denny Hamlin	Joe Gibbs Racing	Toyota	47.695
12	9	Chase Elliott	Hendrick Motorsports	Chevrolet	47.695
13	36	David Ragan	Front Row Motorsports	Ford	47.730
14	1	Kurt Busch	Chip Ganassi Racing	Chevrolet	47.742
15	5	Kyle Larson	Hendrick Motorsports	Chevrolet	47.752
16	18	Kyle Busch	Joe Gibbs Racing	Toyota	47.780
17	21	Matt DiBenedetto	Wood Brothers Racing	Ford	47.881
18	12	Ryan Blaney	Team Penske	Ford	47.895
19	33	Austin Cindric (i)	Team Penske	Ford	47.900
20	16	Kaz Grala	Kaulig Racing	Chevrolet	47.925
21	22	Joey Logano	Team Penske	Ford	47.943
22	14	Chase Briscoe (R)	Stewart-Haas Racing	Ford	47.956
23	6	Ryan Newman	Roush Fenway Racing	Ford	47.960
24	42	Ross Chastain	Chip Ganassi Racing	Chevrolet	47.972
25	41	Cole Custer	Stewart-Haas Racing	Ford	48.060
26	2	Brad Keselowski	Team Penske	Ford	48.072
27	34	Michael McDowell	Front Row Motorsports	Ford	48.124
28	19	Martin Truex Jr.	Joe Gibbs Racing	Toyota	48.165
29	43	Erik Jones	Richard Petty Motorsports	Chevrolet	48.189
30	17	Chris Buescher	Roush Fenway Racing	Ford	48.269
31	8	Tyler Reddick	Richard Childress Racing	Chevrolet	48.347
32	38	Anthony Alfredo (R)	Front Row Motorsports	Ford	48.422
33	96	Ty Dillon (i)	Gaunt Brothers Racing	Toyota	48.446
34	77	Jamie McMurray	Spire Motorsports	Chevrolet	48.746
35	7	Corey LaJoie	Spire Motorsports	Chevrolet	48.767
36	00	Quin Houff	StarCom Racing	Chevrolet	49.571
37	13	Garrett Smithley (i)	MBM Motorsports	Ford	49.880
38	78	B. J. McLeod (i)	Live Fast Motorsports	Ford	49.985
39	66	Timmy Hill (i)	MBM Motorsports	Ford	50.016
40	51	Cody Ware	Petty Ware Racing	Chevrolet	50.074
41	53	Joey Gase	Rick Ware Racing	Ford	50.630
42	52	Josh Bilicki	Rick Ware Racing	Ford	50.926
43	15	Derrike Cope	Rick Ware Racing	Chevrolet	0.000
44	62	Noah Gragson (i)	Beard Motorsports	Chevrolet	0.000
Official qualifying results

== Duels ==
=== Duel 1 ===
==== Duel 1 results ====
Pos	Grid	No	Driver	Team	Manufacturer	Laps	Points
1	2	10	Aric Almirola	Stewart-Haas Racing	Ford	60	10
2	4	20	Christopher Bell	Joe Gibbs Racing	Toyota	60	9
3	12	6	Ryan Newman	Roush Fenway Racing	Ford	60	8
4	11	22	Joey Logano	Team Penske	Ford	60	7
5	5	37	Ryan Preece	JTG Daugherty Racing	Chevrolet	60	6
6	17	96	Ty Dillon (i)	Gaunt Brothers Racing	Toyota	60	5
7	8	5	Kyle Larson	Hendrick Motorsports	Chevrolet	60	4
8	6	99	Daniel Suárez	Trackhouse Racing Team	Chevrolet	60	3
9	14	34	Michael McDowell	Front Row Motorsports	Ford	60	2
10	18	77	Jamie McMurray	Spire Motorsports	Chevrolet	60	1
11	3	47	Ricky Stenhouse Jr.	JTG Daugherty Racing	Chevrolet	60	0
12	9	21	Matt DiBenedetto	Wood Brothers Racing	Ford	60	0
13	7	11	Denny Hamlin	Joe Gibbs Racing	Toyota	60	0
14	13	41	Cole Custer	Stewart-Haas Racing	Ford	60	0
15	16	8	Tyler Reddick	Richard Childress Racing	Chevrolet	60	0
16	10	33	Austin Cindric (i)	Team Penske	Ford	59	0
17	15	43	Erik Jones	Richard Petty Motorsports	Chevrolet	59	0
18	19	00	Quin Houff	StarCom Racing	Chevrolet	58	0
19	20	66	Timmy Hill (i)	MBM Motorsports	Ford	57	0
20	1	48	Alex Bowman	Hendrick Motorsports	Chevrolet	56	0
21	21	51	Cody Ware	Petty Ware Racing	Chevrolet	56	0
22	22	52	Josh Bilicki	Rick Ware Racing	Ford	14	0
Official race results

NOTE: Points in italics are owner points only. The driver is ineligible because he declared points in another national series. Owner points, not driver points, will be used by NASCAR in calculating points for purposes of setting fields for the majority of Cup Series races in 2021.

=== Duel 2 ===
==== Duel 2 results ====
Pos	Grid	No	Driver	Team	Manufacturer	Laps	Points
1	4	3	Austin Dillon	Richard Childress Racing	Chevrolet	63	10
2	2	23	Bubba Wallace	23XI Racing	Toyota	63	9
3	3	4	Kevin Harvick	Stewart-Haas Racing	Ford	63	8
4	8	18	Kyle Busch	Joe Gibbs Racing	Toyota	63	7
5	5	9	Chase Elliott	Hendrick Motorsports	Chevrolet	63	6
6	9	12	Ryan Blaney	Team Penske	Ford	63	5
7	17	7	Corey LaJoie	Spire Motorsports	Chevrolet	63	4
8	6	36	David Ragan	Front Row Motorsports	Ford	63	3
9	7	1	Kurt Busch	Chip Ganassi Racing	Chevrolet	63	2
10	15	17	Chris Buescher	Roush Fenway Racing	Ford	63	1
11	13	2	Brad Keselowski	Team Penske	Ford	63	0
12	14	19	Martin Truex Jr.	Joe Gibbs Racing	Toyota	63	0
13	20	53	Joey Gase	Rick Ware Racing	Ford	63	0
14	10	16	Kaz Grala	Kaulig Racing	Chevrolet	63	0
15	11	14	Chase Briscoe (R)	Stewart-Haas Racing	Ford	61	0
16	18	13	Garrett Smithley (i)	MBM Motorsports	Ford	61	0
17	21	15	Derrike Cope	Rick Ware Racing	Chevrolet	59	0
18	22	62	Noah Gragson (i)	Beard Motorsports	Chevrolet	56	0
19	1	24	William Byron	Hendrick Motorsports	Chevrolet	56	0
20	12	42	Ross Chastain	Chip Ganassi Racing	Chevrolet	56	0
21	16	38	Anthony Alfredo (R)	Front Row Motorsports	Ford	35	0
22	19	78	B. J. McLeod (i)	Live Fast Motorsports	Ford	35	0
Official race results

== Media ==
=== Television ===
FS1
Booth announcers	Pit reporters	In-race analyst
Lap-by-lap: Mike Joy; Color-commentator: Jeff Gordon; Color-commentator: Clint Bowyer	Jamie Little; Regan Smith	Larry McReynolds

=== Radio ===
MRN Radio
Booth announcers	Turn announcers	Pit reporters
Lead announcer: Alex Hayden; Announcer: Jeff Striegle; Announcer: Rusty Wallace	Turns 1 & 2: Dave Moody; Backstretch: Mike Bagley; Turns 3 & 4: Kyle Rickey	Steve Post; Kim Coon
