= Jonathan Hassler =

American NASCAR crew chief

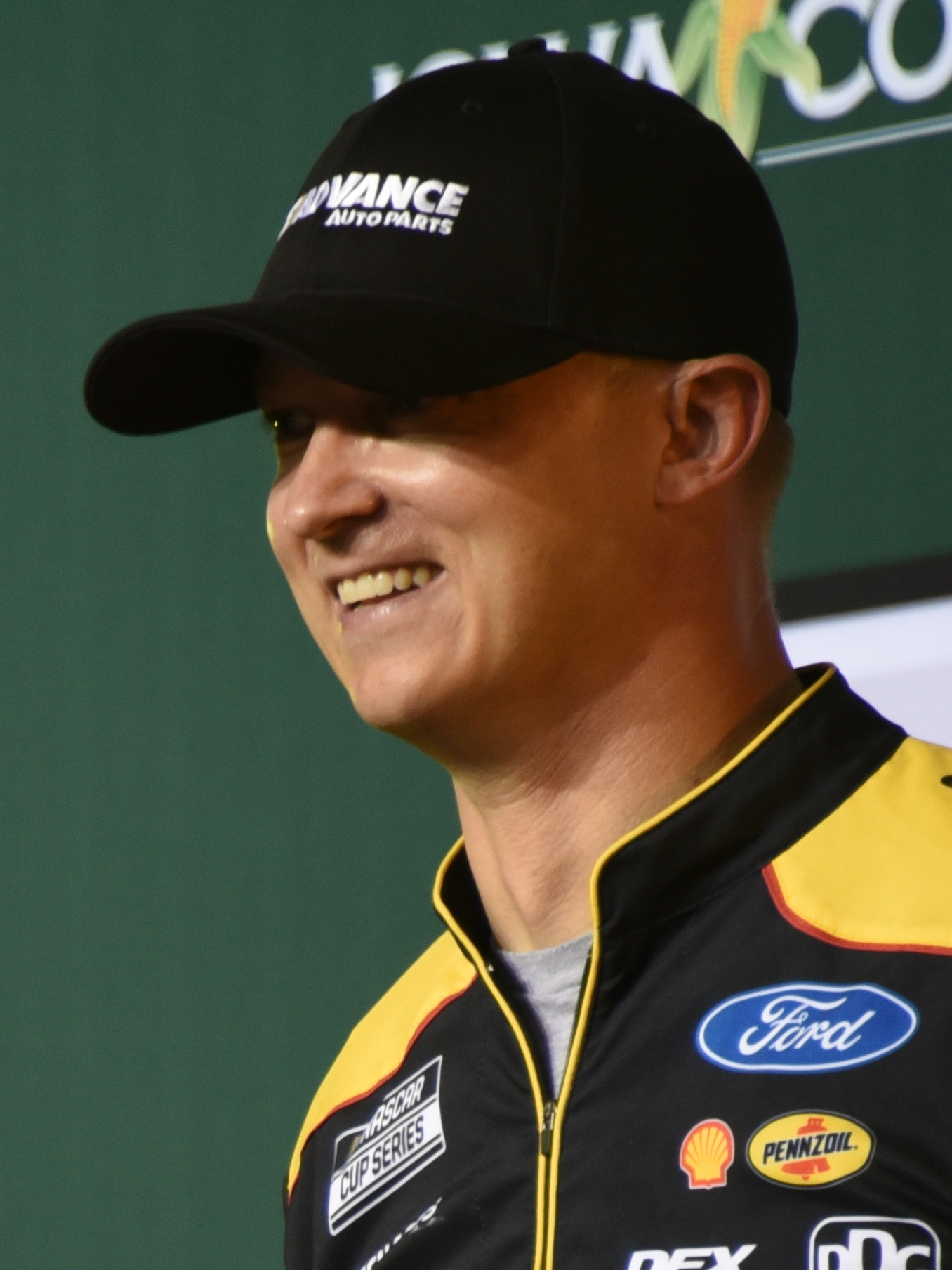
- Hassler celebrating his win in the 2024 Iowa Corn 350

Personal information
- Born: Jonathan Hassler Greencastle, Indiana, U.S.
- Education: Purdue University
- Occupation: Crew chief

Sport
- Country: United States
- Sport: Motor racing
- League: NASCAR Cup Series
- Team: 12. Team Penske

Jonathan Hassler is an American NASCAR crew chief who works for Team Penske as the crew chief of their No. 12 Ford Mustang Dark Horse in the NASCAR Cup Series driven by Ryan Blaney. He is the 2023 NASCAR Cup Series championship-winning crew chief.

== Racing career ==
Hassler is a native of Greencastle, Indiana and raced go-karts and mini sprint cars starting at the age of eight and had aspirations of becoming a driver. He decided he wanted to pursue racing as a career around the age of 13. He also played football for four years and basketball for three years in high school.

Hassler graduated from Purdue University in 2007 with an engineering degree. While in college, he and some of his classmates (including Chris Gabehart, who also went on to become a NASCAR crew chief) formed an organization called Opportunity Motorsports to help local race teams in the Midwest out as crew members during races, including Hendricks County Motorsports with Gabehart when he was a driver. The group of students would later travel to Charlotte, North Carolina to try to intern or be hired by NASCAR race teams. Hassler would intern as an engineer for MB2 Motorsports / Ginn Racing and then be hired by Penske straight out of college to be an engineer on their Xfinity Series team.

After five years working in the Xfinity Series, Hassler was promoted to Penske's Cup Series program and worked on the road crews of Kurt Busch, Brad Keselowski and Joey Logano as an engineer.

Hassler got his first permanent crew chiefing job partway through the 2021 season with the Penske-aligned Wood Brothers Racing crew chiefing their famous No. 21 car driven by Matt DiBenedetto, replacing Greg Erwin, who was released from the team. Earlier in the year, Hassler had previously filled in for Erwin as interim crew chief on the No. 21 car in the race at Martinsville in April when he had COVID-19 and was interim crew chief on Joey Logano's Penske No. 22 car at Dover when Paul Wolfe was suspended for a lug nut infraction.

Hassler returned to Penske in 2022 to crew chief Ryan Blaney's No. 12 car, replacing the retired Todd Gordon. They did go winless in their first season together but Blaney and the No. 12 qualified for the 2022 playoffs on points (the only team to do that that year). Their first win together was in the 2023 Coca-Cola 600. Hassler and Blaney went on to win the playoff races at Talladega and Martinsville in the fall and the 2023 Cup Series championship together in only his second full season as a crew chief. In 2024, Hassler and Blaney would win three races: Iowa (the first ever Cup Series race at that track), Pocono (Blaney's first win there since his first Cup Series win in 2017) and the fall Martinsville race (for the second year in a row) but finished second in the championship behind their teammate Logano. Hassler also missed the spring race at Talladega due to the birth of his daughter days before the race, and engineer Tony Palmer and Penske Competition Director Travis Geisler called the race in-person on the pit box while Hassler would still remotely play a role in race calls back home in North Carolina at the Penske shop.

== Personal life ==
Hassler has a wife and children. His youngest child was born in April 2024 before the race weekend at Talladega. Hassler had to miss the race but still assisted the team from the Penske shop in North Carolina.
