= 2021 Busch Clash =

Non-points exhibition NASCAR race

Race details
- Race 1 of 2 exhibition races in the 2021 NASCAR Cup Series
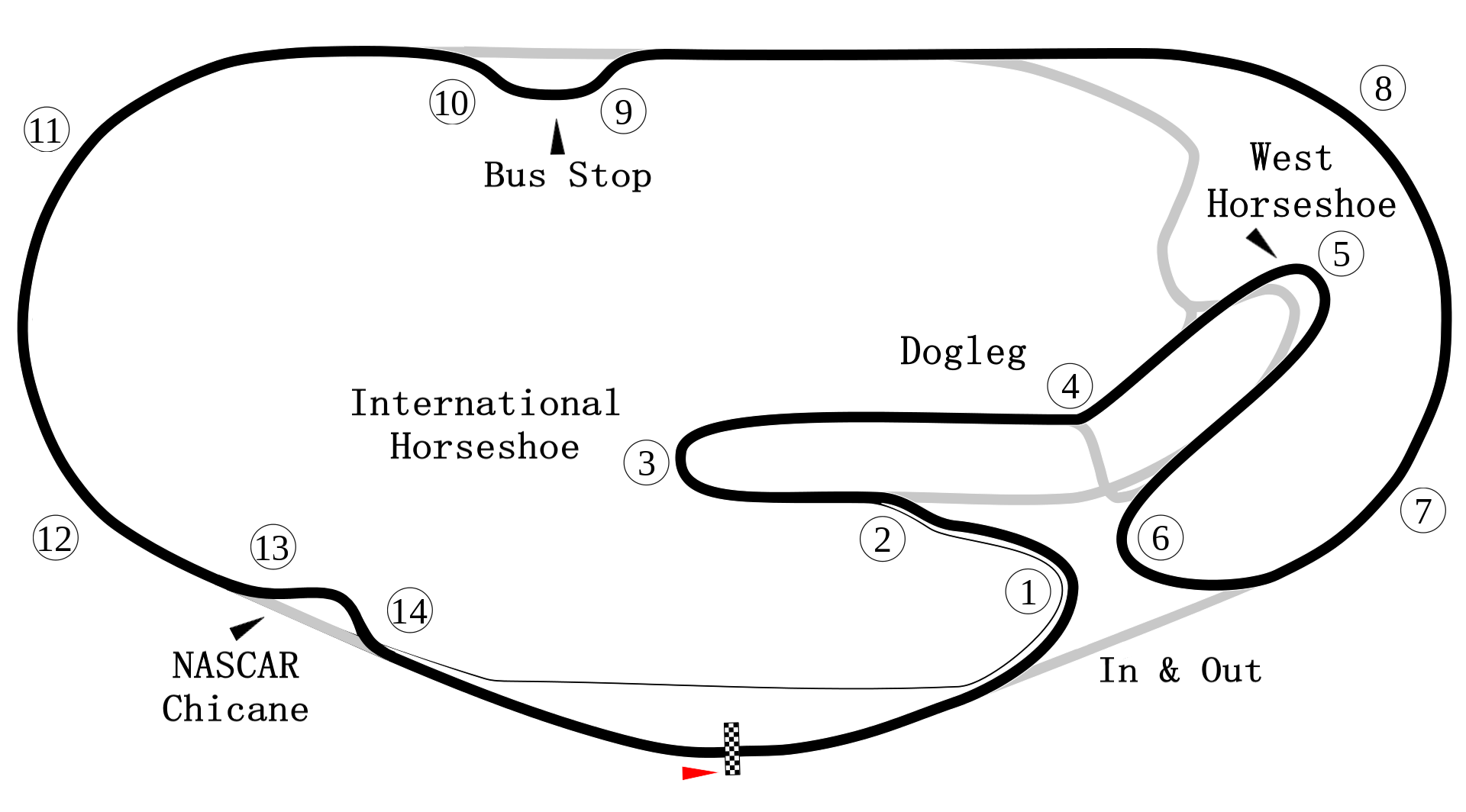
- Date: February 9, 2021
- Location: Daytona International Speedway in Daytona Beach, Florida
- Course: Permanent racing facility
- Course length: 3.610 miles (5.810 km)
- Distance: 35 laps, 126.35 mi (203.341 km)
- Weather: Snowy
- Average speed: 83.845 miles per hour (134.935 km/h)

Pole position
Driver	Ryan Blaney	Team Penske
- Grid positions set by ballot

Most laps led
Driver	Denny Hamlin	Joe Gibbs Racing
- Laps: 21

Winner
No. 18	Kyle Busch	Joe Gibbs Racing

Television in the United States
- Network: FS1
- Announcers: Mike Joy, Jeff Gordon and Clint Bowyer
- Nielsen ratings: 1.755 million

Radio in the United States
- Booth announcers: Alex Hayden, Jeff Striegle and Rusty Wallace
- Turn announcers: Dave Moody (Infield Section: Turns 2–6); Mike Bagley (Turns 7–10); Kyle Rickey (Turns 11–14)

The 2021 Busch Clash was a NASCAR Cup Series race that was held on February 9, 2021 at Daytona International Speedway in Daytona Beach, Florida. Contested over 35 laps, it was the first exhibition race of the 2021 NASCAR Cup Series season.

== Format and eligibility ==
On March 4, 2020, at a media event for the Daytona AMA Supercross Championship round in the tri-oval grass, NASCAR announced the Busch Clash would move to the road course at Daytona on a Tuesday night, in order to deal with a compressed schedule caused by Super Bowl LV in Tampa, which is 125 miles west of Daytona International Speedway via Interstate 4. In addition, with the intent to use the seventh-generation car for the 2021 season (which was delayed a year because of the 10-week suspension of season after the March Phoenix round), NASCAR used the road course move in order to alleviate issues after numerous major crashes marred the past two Clashes by having teams use the sixth-generation car on the road course. This was similar to the 1981 season, which started at the Riverside road course with the second-generation car using the 115 inch wheelbase, instead of the third-generation 110 inch wheelbase car, which debuted at the Daytona races in 1981.

The two segment format used since 2001 was continued, although the second segment was closer in distance to the first. The first segment consisted of 15 laps, while the second segment was 20 laps. For comparison, two weeks later, when the Daytona 400km race was held at the same circuit, the first stage was 14 laps and second stage was 18 laps.

Criteria for qualification the 2021 clash will be different as the race is open to drivers who won the Daytona 500, won a previous Busch Clash, or won a pole for a Daytona 500, all of these criteria require the driver to compete full time in the 2020 Cup Series season. The race is also open to the five 2020 Cup Series pole winners, 2020 Cup Series playoff drivers, 2020 Cup series race winners, and 2020 Cup Series stage winners, all drivers under those criteria do not need to compete full time in the 2020 Cup Series season to the eligible for the race. NASCAR has said the changed criteria for the clash was in response to the COVID-19 pandemic which has led to most races in the 2020 Cup Series season to held without qualifying.

== Entry list ==
No.	Driver	Team	Manufacturer
1	Kurt Busch	Chip Ganassi Racing	Chevrolet
2	Brad Keselowski	Team Penske	Ford
3	Austin Dillon	Richard Childress Racing	Chevrolet
4	Kevin Harvick	Stewart-Haas Racing	Ford
6	Ryan Newman	Roush Fenway Racing	Ford
8	Tyler Reddick	Richard Childress Racing	Chevrolet
9	Chase Elliott	Hendrick Motorsports	Chevrolet
10	Aric Almirola	Stewart-Haas Racing	Ford
11	Denny Hamlin	Joe Gibbs Racing	Toyota
12	Ryan Blaney	Team Penske	Ford
17	Chris Buescher	Roush Fenway Racing	Ford
18	Kyle Busch	Joe Gibbs Racing	Toyota
19	Martin Truex Jr.	Joe Gibbs Racing	Toyota
21	Matt DiBenedetto	Wood Brothers Racing	Ford
22	Joey Logano	Team Penske	Ford
23	Ty Dillon (i)	23XI Racing	Toyota
24	William Byron	Hendrick Motorsports	Chevrolet
41	Cole Custer	Stewart-Haas Racing	Ford
43	Erik Jones	Richard Petty Motorsports	Chevrolet
47	Ricky Stenhouse Jr.	JTG Daugherty Racing	Chevrolet
48	Alex Bowman	Hendrick Motorsports	Chevrolet
Official entry list

== Starting lineup ==
The lineup was determined by random draw, with Ryan Blaney drawing the top spot.

Pos	No	Driver	Team	Manufacturer
1	12	Ryan Blaney	Team Penske	Ford
2	48	Alex Bowman	Hendrick Motorsports	Chevrolet
3	11	Denny Hamlin	Joe Gibbs Racing	Toyota
4	2	Brad Keselowski	Team Penske	Ford
5	24	William Byron	Hendrick Motorsports	Chevrolet
6	8	Tyler Reddick	Richard Childress Racing	Chevrolet
7	9	Chase Elliott	Hendrick Motorsports	Chevrolet
8	41	Cole Custer	Stewart-Haas Racing	Ford
9	43	Erik Jones	Richard Petty Motorsports	Chevrolet
10	22	Joey Logano	Team Penske	Ford
11	6	Ryan Newman	Roush Fenway Racing	Ford
12	21	Matt DiBenedetto	Wood Brothers Racing	Ford
13	17	Chris Buescher	Roush Fenway Racing	Ford
14	23	Ty Dillon (i)	23XI Racing	Toyota
15	1	Kurt Busch	Chip Ganassi Racing	Chevrolet
16	18	Kyle Busch	Joe Gibbs Racing	Toyota
17	4	Kevin Harvick	Stewart-Haas Racing	Ford
18	19	Martin Truex Jr.	Joe Gibbs Racing	Toyota
19	3	Austin Dillon	Richard Childress Racing	Chevrolet
20	47	Ricky Stenhouse Jr.	JTG Daugherty Racing	Chevrolet
21	10	Aric Almirola	Stewart-Haas Racing	Ford
Official starting lineup

== Race ==
Under a clear night sky, the race began at 7:15 p.m., with Ryan Blaney on pole. The caution soon fell for dirt and debris compiling at the bus stop chicane. The competition caution came out on lap 15, with all 21 cars pitting for fuel and tires. Martin Truex Jr., who was leading when the competition caution came out, missed the last chicane and was sent to the rear of the field. By lap 28, he had retaken the lead, with a caution coming out shortly after for Cole Custer’s car catching fire after an engine issue. After the restart, Truex spun in a similar fashion to Kevin Harvick earlier in the race, bringing out the caution once more. The race restarted with Chase Elliott staying out and holding the lead. Tyler Reddick and Chris Buescher collided, sending the latter into Alex Bowman’s No. 48 car, however the race remained green. With a couple laps to go, Blaney caught up to and passed Elliott. Entering the frontstretch chicane on the final lap, Elliott dove inside Blaney, but they collided. Blaney spun while third-place Kyle Busch passed a slowed Elliott win the race, despite not having led any laps beforehand.

=== Race results ===
Pos	Grid	No	Driver	Team	Manufacturer	Laps
1	16	18	Kyle Busch	Joe Gibbs Racing	Toyota	35
2	7	9	Chase Elliott	Hendrick Motorsports	Chevrolet	35
3	10	22	Joey Logano	Team Penske	Ford	35
4	6	8	Tyler Reddick	Richard Childress Racing	Chevrolet	35
5	5	24	William Byron	Hendrick Motorsports	Chevrolet	35
6	3	11	Denny Hamlin	Joe Gibbs Racing	Toyota	35
7	2	48	Alex Bowman	Hendrick Motorsports	Chevrolet	35
8	9	43	Erik Jones	Richard Petty Motorsports	Chevrolet	35
9	20	47	Ricky Stenhouse Jr.	JTG Daugherty Racing	Chevrolet	35
10	12	21	Matt DiBenedetto	Wood Brothers Racing	Ford	35
11	19	3	Austin Dillon	Richard Childress Racing	Chevrolet	35
12	21	10	Aric Almirola	Stewart-Haas Racing	Ford	35
13	1	12	Ryan Blaney	Team Penske	Ford	35
14	11	6	Ryan Newman	Roush Fenway Racing	Ford	35
15	17	4	Kevin Harvick	Stewart-Haas Racing	Ford	35
16	13	17	Chris Buescher	Roush Fenway Racing	Ford	35
17	4	2	Brad Keselowski	Team Penske	Ford	35
18	14	23	Ty Dillon (i)	23XI Racing	Toyota	35
19	15	1	Kurt Busch	Chip Ganassi Racing	Chevrolet	35
20	8	41	Cole Custer	Stewart-Haas Racing	Ford	32
21	18	19	Martin Truex Jr.	Joe Gibbs Racing	Toyota	27
Official race results

== Media ==
FS1 covered the race on the television side; Mike Joy, Jeff Gordon and Clint Bowyer handled the call in the booth for the race; Jamie Little and Regan Smith handled pit road for the television side. Larry McReynolds provided insight from the Fox Sports studio in Charlotte.

=== Television ===
FS1
Booth announcers	Pit reporters	In-race analyst
Lap-by-lap: Mike Joy; Color-commentator: Jeff Gordon; Color-commentator: Clint Bowyer	Jamie Little; Regan Smith	Larry McReynolds

=== Radio ===
MRN Radio
Booth announcers	Turn announcers	Pit reporters
Lead announcer: Alex Hayden; Announcer: Jeff Striegle; Announcer: Rusty Wallace	Turns 2–6 (Infield section): Dave Moody; Turns 7–10: Mike Bagley; Turns 11–14: Kyle Rickey	Steve Post; Kim Coon
