= Beaver Dam Raceway =

American clay oval track

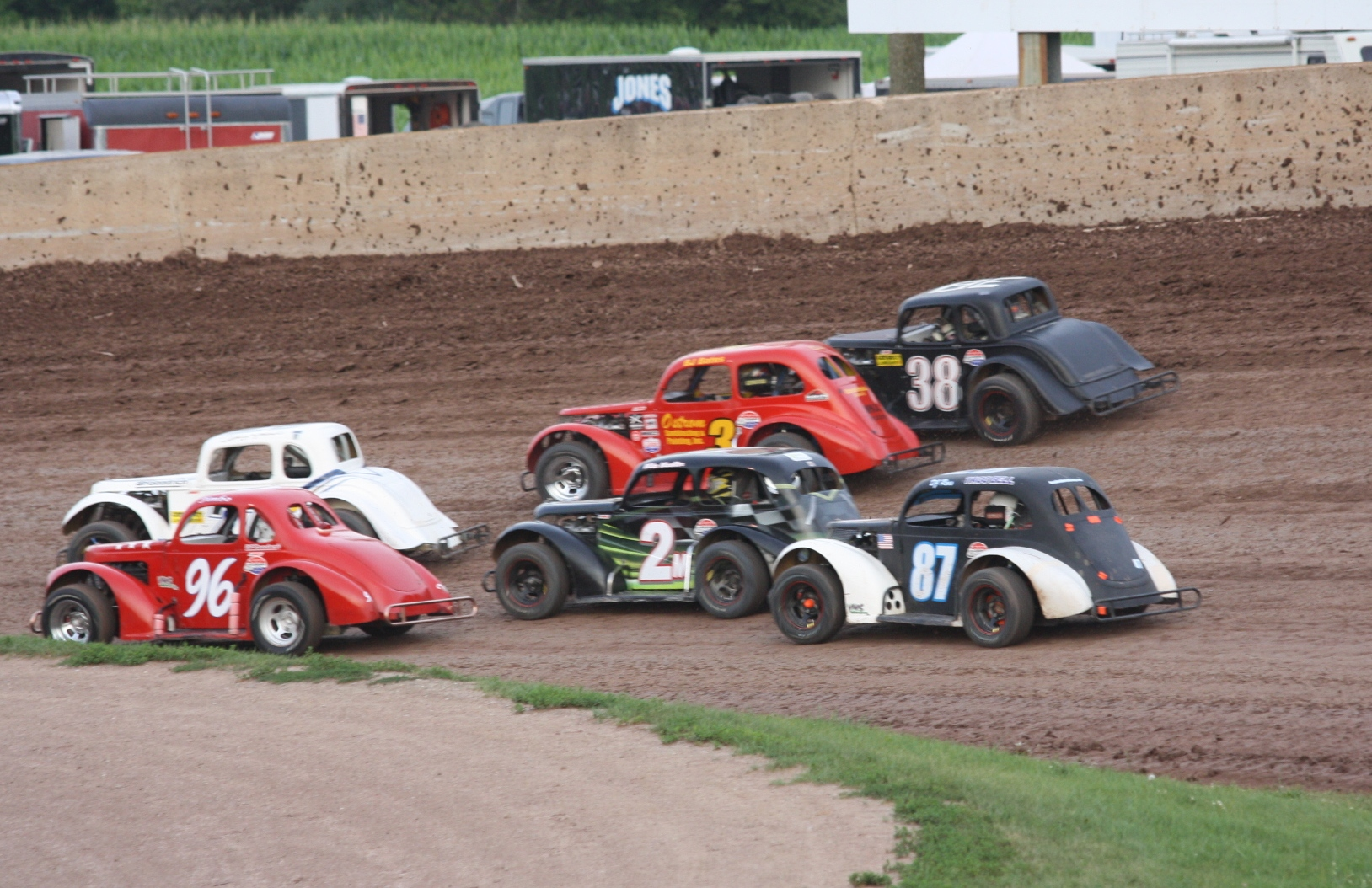
- Legends cars racing at Beaver Dam Raceway, 2010
- Location: N7086 Raceway Road; Beaver Dam, Wisconsin, U.S.A.
- Coordinates: 43.448514°N 88.811873°W
- Capacity: ~7,000
- Broke ground: 1992
- Opened: 1993
- Closed: 1998 (re-opened in 2000)
- Major events: World of Outlaw Sprints; World of Outlaws Late Model Series; IRA Sprints

Clay oval track
- Length: 0.332 mi (0.535 km)

Beaver Dam Raceway was a one-third mile banked clay oval track located in Beaver Dam, Wisconsin, U.S.A. The track holds weekly races over the Northern American summer months. It hosts an annual World of Outlaws sprint car races. The 2013 U.S. Dirt Legends Nationals event was held at the track. The World of Outlaws Late Model Series added an event in 2020. It has held midget car events on the POWRi Midget Racing and USAC National Midgets national tours. The track announced in 2024 it is completing the 2024 race schedule and will no longer have "weekly racing" in 2025. The track has since confirmed that it will cease operation following their "Grand Finale" event which will take place on September 19th & 20th of 2025.

== Divisions ==
This track has an average of 90 to 110 cars participating in every Saturday night race with some specials on holidays and weekdays. The current weekly divisions are modifieds, IMCA Stock Cars, Legends, sport modifieds, and street stocks. Well-known race car drivers, such as Kasey Kahne, (currently in NASCAR), Kenny Schrader, Tony Stewart, Josh Wise (all retired from NASCAR) and Steve Kinser (also retired from NASCAR), have competed here. Drivers from the United States, Canada, and other countries have competed at Beaver Dam Raceway - including Japan and Australia. The racetrack is located exactly 860 feet (260 m) above sea level. The current track record is 11.025 seconds, set by Sheldon Haudenschild on June 17, 2022. The track also features a 1/5th mile Go-Kart track in the infield, which runs on Tuesday nights.

== History ==
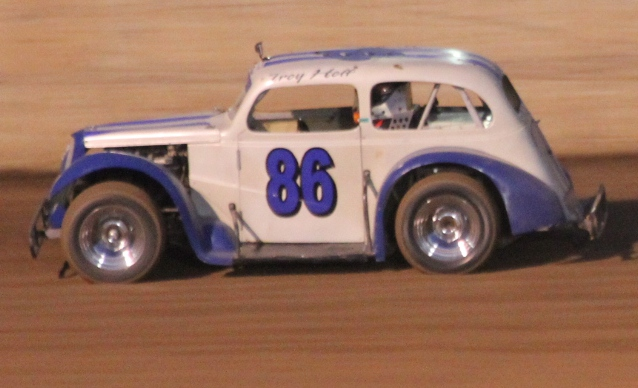
Troy Hoff of Flasher, North Dakota, 2013 U.S. Dirt Legends Nationals Young Lions class winner

The modern track opened on May 29, 1993, operating through 1998, and reopening in 2000. Its alternative names are Powercom Park Raceway, The Raceway at Powercom Park, Charter Raceway Park, Wisconsin Motorsports Park and Raceway Park. The track held a World of Outlaws sprint car event from 1996 to 1998, and from 2002 until the present, and have also held multiple World of Outlaws Late Model events. The track hosts legends cars and held the 2013 U.S. Dirt Legends Nationals in October.

A fatality occurred at the track September 20, 2014, when the IRA Outlaw Sprint Series driver Scott Semmelmann flipped his car during a practice. The 410 sprint car tour event was canceled.

On June 23, 2018, another fatal incident occurred when former Knoxville Nationals champion Jason Johnson crashed on lap 18 while racing for the lead in the World of Outlaws series A-main. The car made contact with another car and tumbled violently into the Turn 3 billboards.

=== Past Champions ===
Modified racing
Dirt modifieds racing at Beaver Dam Raceway — 2.1 MB

Season	Modifieds	Sport Modifieds	Street Stocks	Grand Nationals	Legends
2021	Noah Schepp	Nick Schultz	Jason White	Justin Pearson	Jordan Miklas
2020	Jimmy Berkevich	Geoff Jeche	James Fletcher	Aaron Streblow	Mike Mueller
2019	Dave Schoenberger	Elijah Koenig	Mike Winters	Tommy Moore	Ryan Mech
2018	Matt Rechek	Mike Mueller	Mike Winters	Aaron Streblow	Justin Pearson
2017	Tim Lemirande	Elijah Koenig	Mike Winters	Roger Lee	Cody Apfelbeck
2016	Don Sheffler	James Berkevich, Jr.	Mike Winters	Roger Lee	Mike Mueller
2015	Matt Rechek	Brandon Riedner	Brandon Riedner	Kenny Richards	Mike Mueller
2014	Jeremy Christians	Jeff Schmuhl	Scott Riedner	Tommy Moore	Joe Bongiorno
2013	Don Scheffler	Jeff Steenbergen	Scott Riedner	Kenny Richards	Joe Johnson
2012	Jeremy Christians	Leroy Ostrowski	Brandon Riedner	Roger Lee	Brandon Schmitt
2011	Jeremy Christians	Zeke Bishofberger	Brandon Riedner	Kenny Richards	Eric Barth
2010	Craig Priewe	Jeff Steenbergen	Aaron Streblow	Roger Lee	Brandon Schmitt
2009	Craig Priewe	Jeff Schmuhl	Jesse Kanas	Roger Lee	Eric Barth

=== World of Outlaws Sprint Cars A-Feature Winners ===
Year	Winner
2024	Sheldon Haudenschild (May 31) (5)
2023	Giovanni Scelzi (June 16); Sheldon Haudenschild (June 17) (4)
2022	Sheldon Haudenschild (June 17) (2); Sheldon Haudenschild (June 18) (3)
2021	Sheldon Haudenschild (June 19)
2020	Brad Sweet (June 5) (3); Brad Sweet (June 6) (4)
2019	Brad Sweet (June 22) (2)
2018	Daryn Pittman (June 23) (4)
2017	Shane Stewart (June 24)
2016	Bill Balog (June 25)^{*}
2015	Donny Schatz (June 27) (2)
2014	Brad Sweet (June 28)
2013	Craig Dollansky (June 29) (2)
2012	Kraig Kinser (July 7)
2011	Joey Saldana (July 9) (3)
2010	Joey Saldana (July 10) (2)
2009	Danny Lasoski (July 11)
2008	Steve Kinser (Aug. 2nd) (2)
2007	Jason Solwold (Aug. 3rd)^{*}; Daryn Pittman (Sept. 16th) (3)
2006	Jac Haudenschild (June 14) (2)
2005	Craig Dollansky (July 6); Daryn Pittman (Sept. 24th) (2)
2004	Steve Kinser (June 12); Tim Shaffer (Sept. 25th)
2003	Joey Saldana (April 22); Daryn Pittman (Aug. 3rd)
2002	Donny Schatz (July 10)
1998	Jac Haudenschild (June 17)
1997	Mark Kinser (May 4); Dave Blaney (June 18) (2)
1996	Dave Blaney (May 5)

^{*} First career Outlaws win
