= Mark Kinser =

American sprint car racing driver

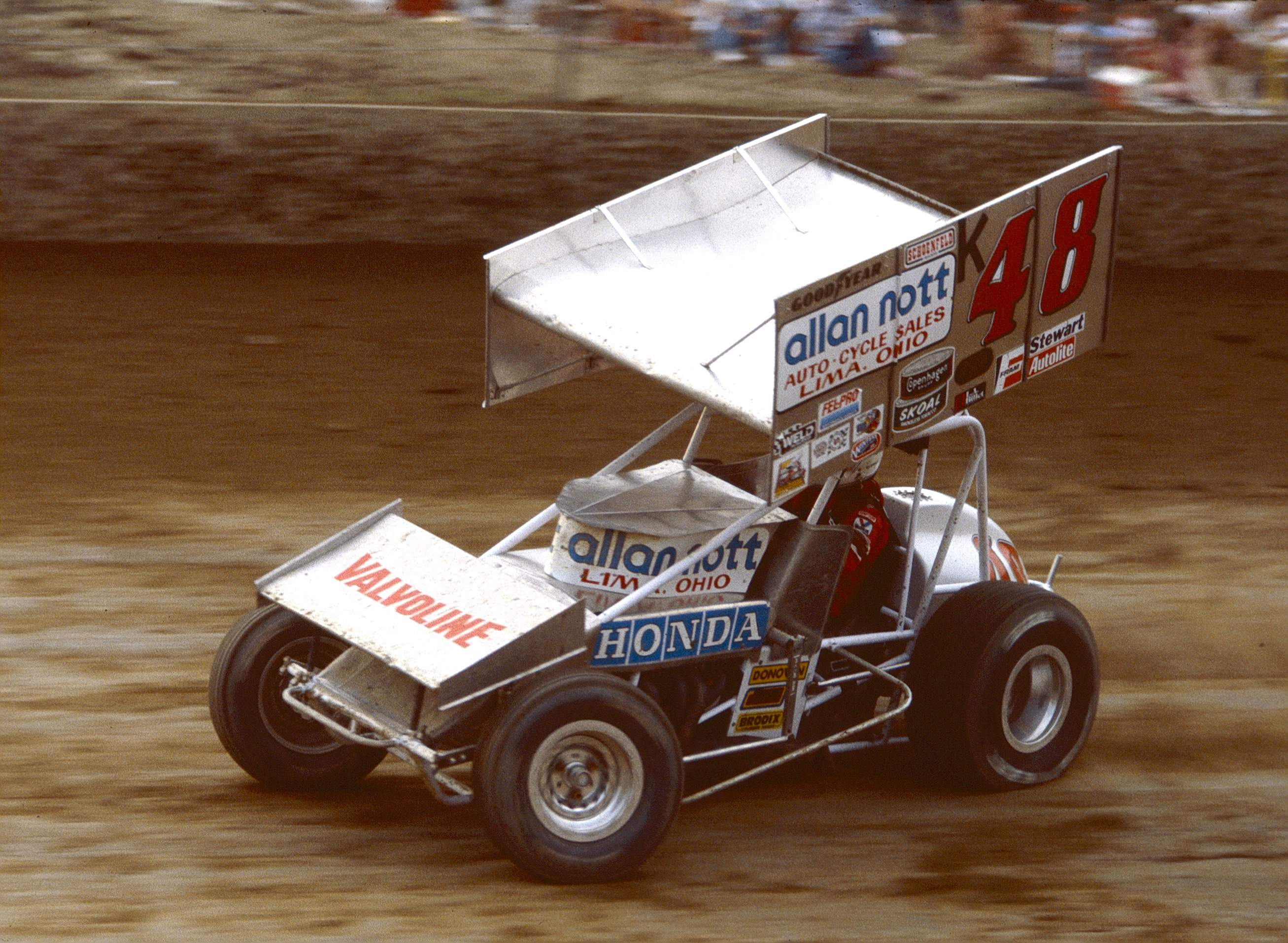
Kinser racing a sprint car

Mark Kinser (born May 5, 1964) is an American former sprint car racing driver. He hails from Oolitic, Indiana.

Cousin to Steve Kinser, Mark won the 1996 and 1999 World of Outlaws championship and was runner-up in 1991, 1998, and 2001. He is the 1996, 1999, and 2000 Knoxville Nationals champion as well as the 2001 King's Royal winner. In 2006, one of the World of Outlaws Sprint Car Series’ most successful drivers suddenly retired. After winning 153 features, standing on the podium 214 times, capturing the famed Knoxville Nationals three times and being crowned WoO champion in 1996 and 1999, he suddenly retired from professional racing.

Kinser is fourth on the all-time wins list with 153 A-feature wins, behind Donny Schatz, Sammy Swindell and cousin Steve, respectively.

In 1997, Kinser attempted to qualify for four NASCAR Craftsman Truck Series races, driving the No. 92 Chevrolet for SKB Racing, but failed to qualify for any of them. Unlike his cousin, Steve, or Kraig Kinser, Mark Kinser never ventured into NASCAR Sprint Cup or IndyCar.

In 2014, Kinser was inducted into the National Sprint Car Hall of Fame.

== Motorsports career results ==
=== NASCAR ===
(key) (Bold - Pole position awarded by time. Italics - Pole position earned by points standings. * – Most laps led.)

==== Craftsman Truck Series ====
NASCAR Craftsman Truck Series results
Year	Team	No.	Make	1	2	3	4	5	6	7	8	9	10	11	12	13	14	15	16	17	18	19	20	21	22	23	24	25	26	NCTC	Pts
1997	SKB Racing	92	Chevy	WDW; DNQ	TUS	HOM	PHO; DNQ	POR	EVG; DNQ	I70; DNQ	NHA	TEX	BRI	NZH	MLW	LVL	CNS	HPT	IRP	FLM	NSV	GLN	RCH	MAR	SON	MMR	CAL	PHO	LVS	108th	96

Sporting positions
Preceded by Dave Blaney	World of Outlaws Champion; 1996	Succeeded by Sammy Swindell
Preceded by Steve Kinser	World of Outlaws Champion; 1999	Succeeded by Steve Kinser
