= Erin Crocker =

American racing driver (born 1981)

Erin Crocker Evernham
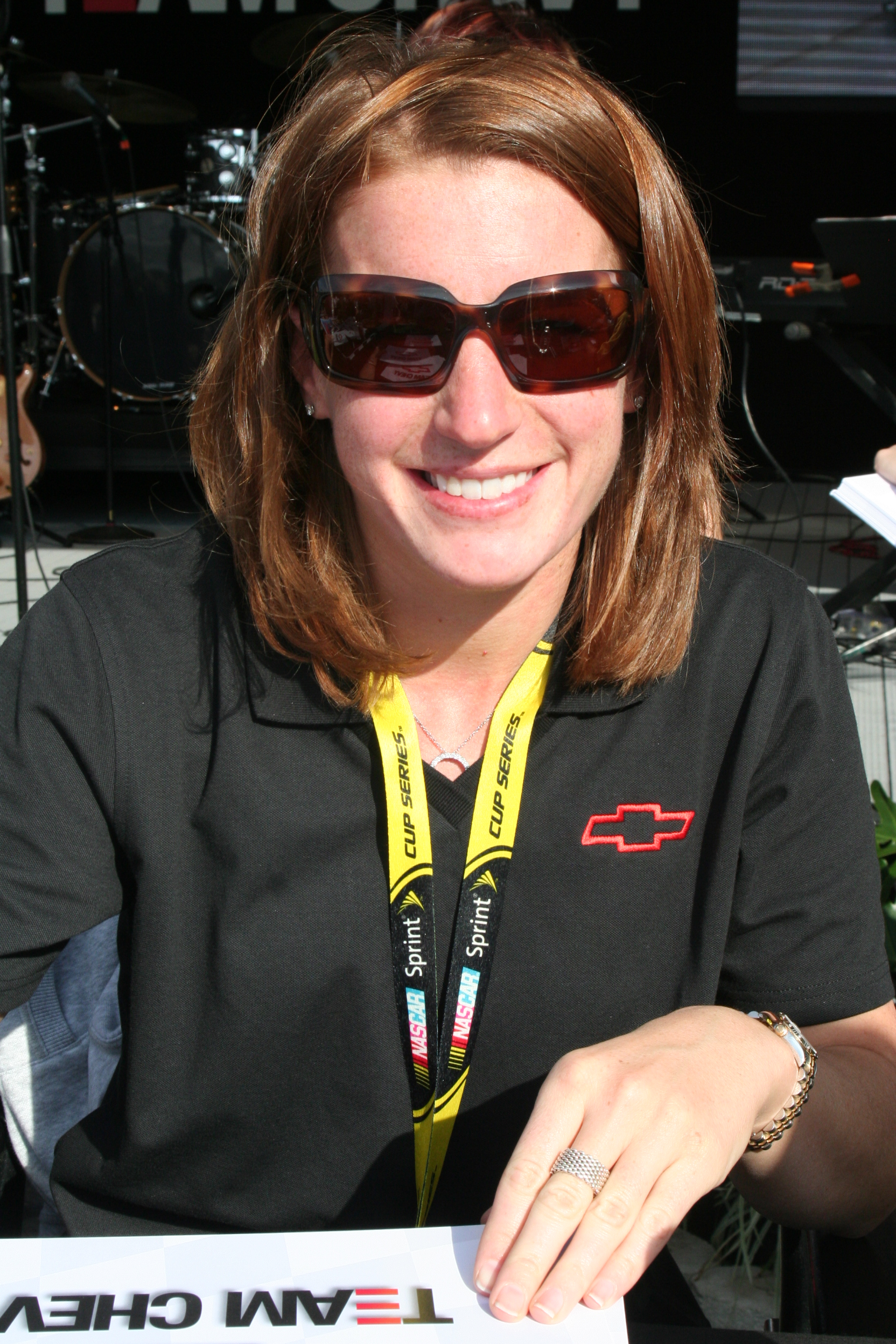
- Crocker at Daytona in 2008
- Born: Erin Mary Crocker; March 23, 1981 (age 45); Wilbraham, Massachusetts, U.S.
- Achievements: 1993–1996 Quarter Midgets of America Northeast Regional Champion
- Awards: 1993–1995 Quarter Midgets of America Female Driver of the Year; 2003 Knoxville Nationals Rookie of the Year

NASCAR O'Reilly Auto Parts Series career
- 10 races run over 2 years
- Best finish: 67th (2006)
- First race: 2005 Emerson Radio 250 (Richmond)
- Last race: 2006 Ford 300 (Homestead)
Wins	Top tens	Poles
0	0	0

NASCAR FedEx Freight Truck Series career
- 29 races run over 3 years
- Best finish: 25th (2006)
- First race: 2005 Chevy Silverado 150 (Phoenix)
- Last race: 2008 San Bernardino County 200 (Fontana)
Wins	Top tens	Poles
0	0	0

ARCA Menards Series career
- 25 races run over 3 years
- Best finish: 21st (2007)
- First race: 2005 PFG Lester 150 (Nashville)
- Last race: 2007 ARCA Re/Max 250 (Talladega Superspeedway)
Wins	Top tens	Poles
0	16	5

Erin Mary Crocker Evernham (born March 23, 1981) is an American race car driver and broadcaster with the Motor Racing Network's Winged Nation. In the past, she played soccer, tennis, and varsity lacrosse on both her high school and college teams. She eventually moved to focus more on building a family after starting a personal relationship with her team owner and superior, Ray Evernham, whom she eventually married.

== Early career ==
Crocker first started racing quarter midgets at the age of seven in the Custom Quarter Midget Club, based in Thompson, Connecticut, and the Silver City Quarter Midget Club from Meriden, Connecticut and was named the Most Improved Novice during her first year of competition. She then moved on to win several awards and three Northeast Regional Quarter Midgets of America championships from 1993 to 1996 while in middle and high school. In 1997, Crocker began running Mini Sprints at Whip City Speedway in Westfield, MA. She became the youngest driver and the first female to win a race at the track. In 1998 she again competed in a 1200cc Mini sprint at Whip City and also with the Central New York Mini Sprint Association (CNYMS). In 1999, she moved to the Eastern Limited Sprint Series, and was named Rookie of the Year.

Crocker started racing professionally in the World of Outlaws while attending Rensselaer Polytechnic Institute in Troy, New York, where she graduated with a bachelor's degree in industrial and management engineering in 2003. In 2002, Crocker signed with Woodring Racing to drive a 360 winged sprint car. She won five feature races as well as twelve heat events, earning her the National Sprint Car Hall of Fame Outstanding Newcomer Award. The following season, she switched to 410 Dirt Sprints, and became the first woman to qualify for the Knoxville Nationals. She won the 410 division's Rookie of the Year honors at season's end.

== NASCAR and ARCA ==
=== 2004 ===
In 2004, Crocker won an opportunity to drive for Ford Motor Company's driver development program, and tested a Ford sprint for Bob East (racing) and Steve Lewis that season. She also became the first female World of Outlaws driver to win a feature race that year in Tulare, California.

=== 2005 ===
The following season, she left Ford to join Evernham Motorsports' driver development program. During the season, she raced in the ARCA RE/MAX Series and collected three top-fives, including a second-place finish, five top-tens, and two poles in six starts. She also made her NASCAR debut that season at Richmond International Raceway driving the No. 6 Dodge for Evernham in the Busch Series. She started 42nd after a wreck in qualifying, and proceeded to finish 39th after another wreck. In her next start at Dover International Speedway, she qualified ninth, but wrecked eleven laps into the race after being tapped by Justin Labonte. Crocker sustained a cracked rib from the incident forcing her to sit out some races she was scheduled to compete in. She ran two more races that season, one for Evernham and the other for FitzBradshaw Racing, her best finish coming at Memphis Motorsports Park, where she finished 29th for FitzBradshaw in the No. 40 Dodge Charger. She also ran a pair of Truck races for Bobby Hamilton Racing, at Phoenix and Homestead-Miami Speedway. Crocker crashed in both races.

=== 2006 ===
In 2006 Crocker drove the No. 98 full-time in the Truck Series. She finished 25th in the Craftsman Truck standings. After struggling during the 2006 season, Evernham decided to close the No. 98 team.

During her tenure as a Truck Series driver, a dispute between then-Evernham Cup driver Jeremy Mayfield and Ray Evernham resulted in a series of lawsuits between Mayfield and Evernham. In Mayfield’s legal filings, he asserted that the No. 19 team’s lack of on-track success was due in large part to Evernham’s attention being focused on his personal relationship with an unnamed female driver. At the time, Crocker was the only female driver employed by Evernham Motorsports. Evernham confirmed in an interview with ESPN that the relationship exists and has hurt Crocker's career.

=== 2007 ===
In 2007, Crocker ran a select number of ARCA Series events. She won the pole for the season-opening ARCA race at Daytona International Speedway in 2007. She however struggled, finishing 20th in the race.

=== 2008 ===
Following the fall 2007 ARCA race at Talladega Superspeedway, it was confirmed that Crocker had left Evernham Motorsports. She ran a limited two-race schedule in the truck series for Morgan-Dollar Motorsports, before she was replaced by Red Bull drivers A. J. Allmendinger and Scott Speed. For the ARCA/REMAX race on September 6, 2008, she joined the broadcast booth for SPEED.

== Personal life ==
Crocker and former boss/team owner Ray Evernham were wed on August 26, 2009 in Las Vegas.

On July 25, 2015, Crocker gave birth to a daughter, Cate Susan Evernham.

== Motorsports career results ==
=== NASCAR ===
(key) (Bold – Pole position awarded by qualifying time. Italics – Pole position earned by points standings or practice time. * – Most laps led.)

==== Busch Series ====
NASCAR Busch Series results
Year	Team	No.	Make	1	2	3	4	5	6	7	8	9	10	11	12	13	14	15	16	17	18	19	20	21	22	23	24	25	26	27	28	29	30	31	32	33	34	35	NBSC	Pts	Ref
2005	Evernham Motorsports	6	Dodge	DAY	CAL	MXC	LVS	ATL	NSH	BRI	TEX	PHO	TAL	DAR	RCH	CLT	DOV	NSH	KEN	MLW	DAY	CHI	NHA	PPR	GTY	IRP	GLN	MCH	BRI	CAL	RCH; 39	DOV; 35	KAN	CLT		TEX	PHO; 40	HOM	90th	223	
2005	Fitz Racing	40	Dodge																																MEM; 29				90th	223	
2006	Evernham Motorsports	98	Dodge	DAY	CAL	MXC	LVS	ATL	BRI	TEX	NSH; 37	PHO	TAL	RCH	DAR	CLT	DOV	NSH	KEN	MLW; 28	DAY	CHI	NHA	MAR	GTY; 19	IRP; 26	GLN	MCH	BRI	CAL	RCH	DOV	KAN	CLT	MEM	TEX	PHO; 30		67th	474	
2006	Curb-Agajanian Motorsports	43	Dodge																																			HOM; 28	67th	474	

==== Craftsman Truck Series ====
NASCAR Craftsman Truck Series results
Year	Team	No.	Make	1	2	3	4	5	6	7	8	9	10	11	12	13	14	15	16	17	18	19	20	21	22	23	24	25	NCTC	Pts	Ref
2005	Bobby Hamilton Racing	4	Dodge	DAY	CAL	ATL	MAR	GTY	MFD	CLT	DOV	TEX	MCH	MLW	KAN	KEN	MEM	IRP	NSH	BRI	RCH	NHA	LVS	MAR	ATL	TEX	PHO; 36		91st	55	
2005	Bobby Hamilton Racing	05	Dodge																									HOM; 30	91st	55	
2006	Evernham Motorsports	98	Dodge	DAY; 27	CAL; 27	ATL; 26	MAR; 25	GTY; 22	CLT; 18	MFD; 28	DOV; 24	TEX; 33	MCH; 24	MLW; 25	KAN; 16	KEN; 27	MEM; 30	IRP; 27	NSH; 29	BRI; 35	NHA; 32	LVS; 24	TAL; 20	MAR; 26	ATL; 23	TEX; 36	PHO; 16	HOM; 34	25th	2113	
2008	Morgan-Dollar Motorsports	46	Chevy	DAY; 14	CAL; 27	ATL	MAR	KAN	CLT	MFD	DOV	TEX	MCH	MLW	MEM	KEN	IRP	NSH	BRI	GTW	NHA	LVS	TAL	MAR	ATL	TEX	PHO	HOM	60th	203	

=== ARCA Re/Max Series ===
(key) (Bold – Pole position awarded by qualifying time. Italics – Pole position earned by points standings or practice time. * – Most laps led.)

ARCA Re/Max Series results
Year	Team	No.	Make	1	2	3	4	5	6	7	8	9	10	11	12	13	14	15	16	17	18	19	20	21	22	23	ARSC	Pts	Ref
2005	Evernham Motorsports	98	Dodge	DAY	**NSH**; 12	SLM	KEN	TOL	LAN	MIL	POC	MCH; 7	KAN	**KEN**; 2	BLN	POC; 3	GTW	LER	NSH; 3	MCH	ISF	TOL	DSF	CHI	SLM	TAL; 4	33rd	1285	
2006	Evernham Motorsports	98	Dodge	DAY; 15	NSH; 14	SLM	WIN	KEN	TOL	POC	MCH; 4	KAN; 2	**KEN**; 27	BLN	POC	GTW; 8	NSH; 36	MCH	ISF	MIL	TOL	DSF	CHI	SLM	TAL	IOW	36th	1110	
2007	Evernham Motorsports	98	Dodge	**DAY**; 20	USA	NSH; 3	SLM	KAN; 7	WIN	KEN; 2	TOL	IOW	POC; 20	MCH; 3	BLN	**KEN**; 5	POC; 4	NSH; 6	ISF	MIL	GTW; 17	DSF	CHI; 5	SLM	TAL; 18	TOL	21st	2240	
