= Bobby Allen (racing driver) =

American racing driver (1943–2025)

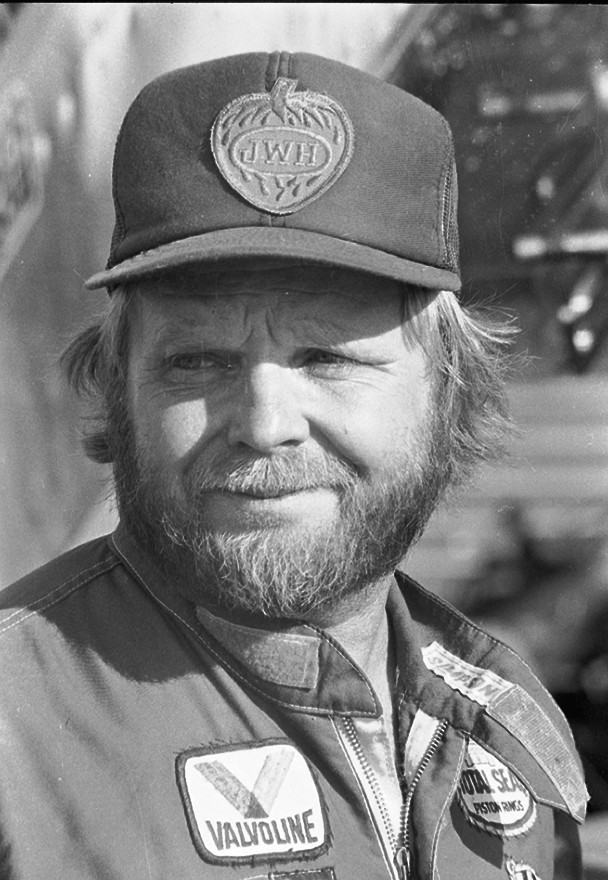
Allen in 1986

Bobby Allen (December 28, 1943 – October 5, 2025) was an American racecar driver known for racing winged sprint cars. Up until his death, he owned Shark Racing, a World of Outlaws sprint car team that fielded two cars driven by his son Jacob Allen and his grandson Logan Schuchart.

== Early life ==
Allen was born to Joe and Jane Allen in Daytona, Florida. His father had driven stock cars with NASCAR during its early years before becoming a pilot and moving the family to Miami. In his teenage years, Allen had dreamed of driving at the Indianapolis 500.

== Racing career ==
Allen's first racing experience came in Florida at twelve years old in half midgets, and he soon moved up into kart racing. In 1960, he won the World Champion karting event in Nassau, Bahamas, organized by the Go Kart Club of America. The following year in 1961, he won the 100cc karting World Championship in Milan, Italy.

=== Modified and supermodified racing ===
In the early 1960s, Allen raced modified and supermodified racecars in Florida. In the mid-1960s, he moved north and settled in Hanover, Pennsylvania. As Allen convinced several other out-of-state drivers to move north to join him, they became known as the "Hanover Gang".

=== Sprint car racing ===
Allen built his first sprint car in 1968. He claimed over 276 sprint car wins across numerous tracks and series. He was a charter member of the World of Outlaws sprint car series when it debuted in 1978, and finished third in the point standings that inaugural year. He recorded 30 wins in that series, joining fewer than two dozen drivers in Outlaws history who have achieved 25 or more wins. He could also claim 46 wins in the All Star Circuit of Champions, putting him in the top 10 all-time in that series.

== Death ==
Allen died on October 5, 2025, at the age of 81.

== Accomplishments ==
- Knoxville Nationals winner, 1990
- National Sprint Car Hall of Fame, 1998 inductee
- Eastern Motorsport Press Association Hall of Fame, 2006 inductee
