= Sammy Swindell =

American racing driver (born 1955)

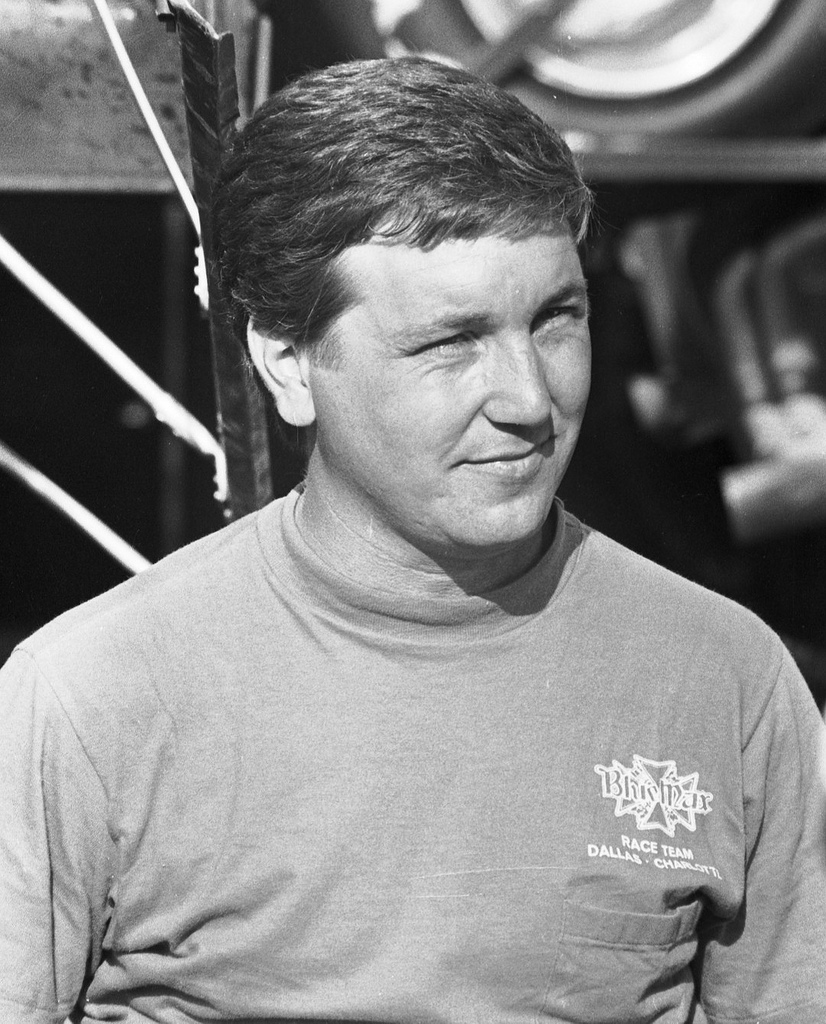
- Swindell in the 1980s
- Born: October 26, 1955 (age 71); Bartlett, Tennessee, U.S.
- Achievements: 1981, 1982, 1997 World of Outlaws Champion; 1981 Ascot Pacific Coast Nationals Winner; 1982, 1984, 1985, 1990, 1991 Super DIRT Week Sprint Nationals Winner; 1983 Knoxville Nationals Winner; 1989, 1992, 1996, 1998, 2009 Chili Bowl Nationals Winner; 1992, 1999, 2012 Kings Royal Winner; 2009, 2011, 2012, 2015 Vacuworx Invitational Race of Champions Winner; 2011/12 New Zealand Sprintcar Champion; 2016 Knoxville 360 Nationals Winner

NASCAR Cup Series career
- 2 races run over 2 years
- Best finish: 85th (1985)
- First race: 1985 Atlanta Journal 500 (Atlanta)
- Last race: 1991 Daytona 500 (Daytona)
| Wins | Top tens | Poles |
|---|---|---|
| 0 | 0 | 0 |

NASCAR O'Reilly Auto Parts Series career
- 10 races run over 4 years
- Best finish: 55th (1993)
- First race: 1984 Goody's 300 (Daytona)
- Last race: 1993 Kroger 200 (IRP)
| Wins | Top tens | Poles |
|---|---|---|
| 0 | 0 | 0 |

NASCAR FedEx Freight Truck Series career
- 20 races run over 1 year
- Best finish: 12th (1995)
- First race: 1995 Skoal Bandit Copper World Classic (Phoenix)
- Last race: 1995 GM Goodwrench/Delco Battery 200 (Phoenix)
| Wins | Top tens | Poles |
|---|---|---|
| 0 | 5 | 0 |

Champ Car career
- 3 races run over 2 years
- Years active: 1985–1986
- Team(s): Patrick Racing; A.J. Foyt Racing
- Best finish: 29th (1985)
- First race: 1985 Michigan 500 (Michigan)
- Last race: 1986 Domino's Pizza 500 (Pocono)
| Wins | Podiums | Poles |
|---|---|---|
| 0 | 0 | 0 |

Samuel Alan "Slammin Sammy" Swindell (born October 26, 1955) is an American sprint car driver. He is a three-time champion and four-time runner-up in the World of Outlaws series; he has also competed in NASCAR and Champ Car competition and attempted to qualify for the 1987 Indianapolis 500.

== Career ==
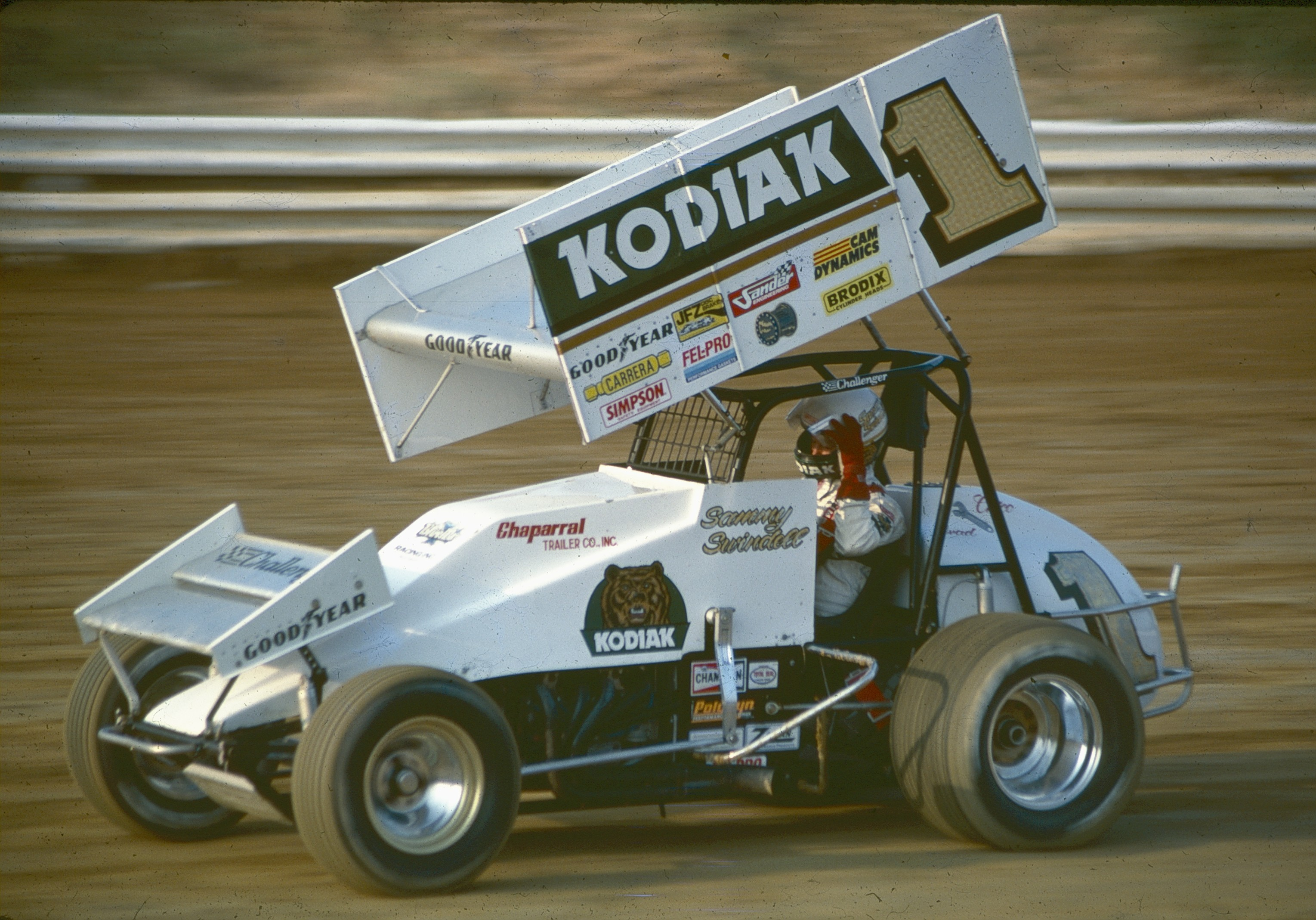
Swindell racing in the World of Outlaws

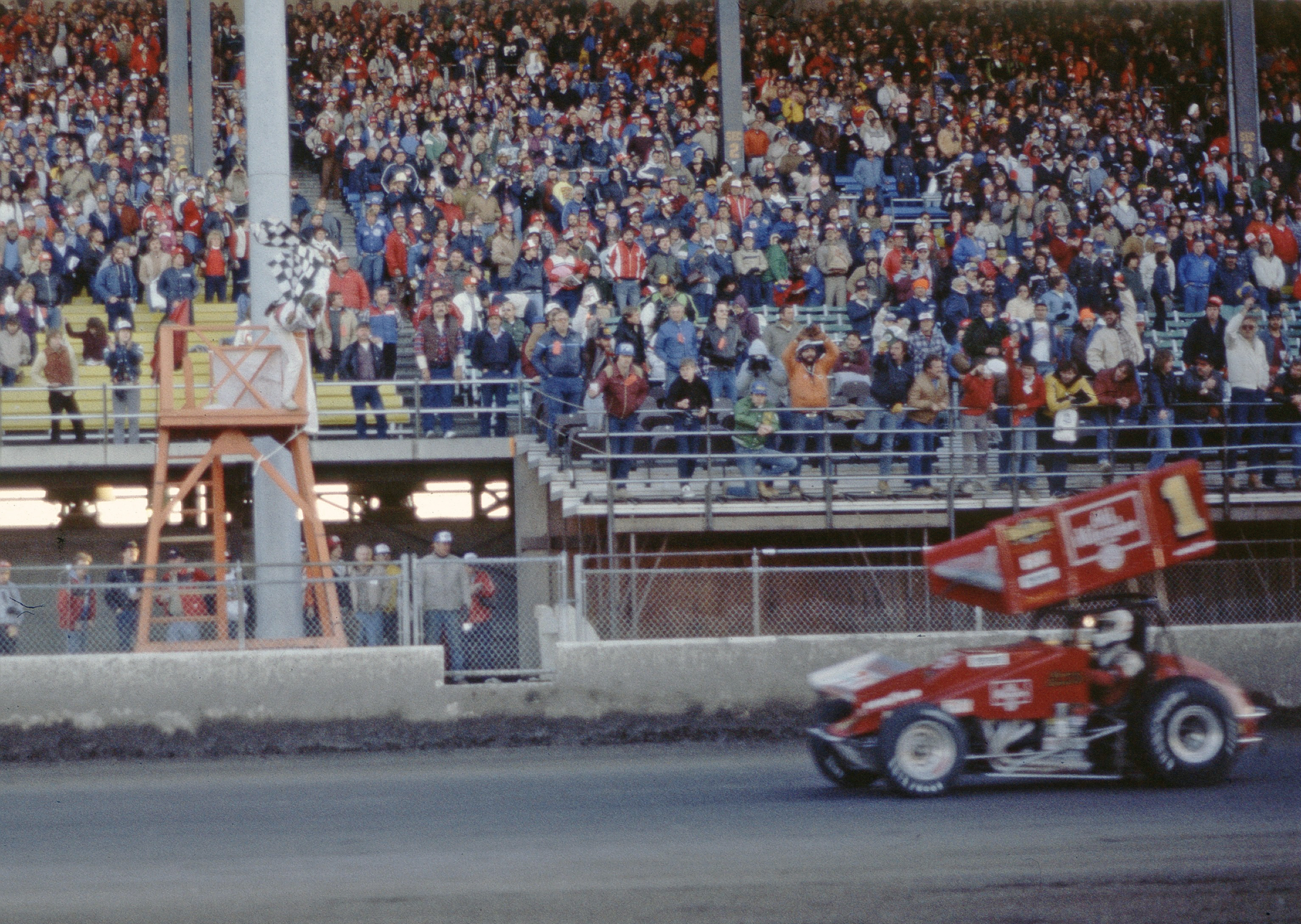
Swindell taking the checkered flag at the Syracuse Mile in 1984

Swindell is a three-time World of Outlaws champion. He won his first two titles in 1981 and 1982 driving the famous Nance Speed Equipment #1n house car. He won his third title in 1997 driving his own Channel Lock sponsored No. 1 team car. Sammy has 394 World of Outlaws A-main victories to his credit. He also competed in the CART series in 1985 and 1986 and failed to qualify for the 1987 Indianapolis 500 in a March-Pontiac. Swindell took off the wings in 1981, to win the prestigious Pacific Coast Nationals at Ascot.

Swindell made his debut in the NASCAR Winston Cup Series in the 1985 Atlanta Journal 500; in 1991, he planned to move full-time to the Winston Cup Series, competing for Rookie of the Year for Moroso Racing, but he was fired by the team following several spins during Speedweeks and crashing again in qualifying for the second race of the year at Richmond International Raceway. Following his release he returned to sprint car racing.

Swindell ran a limited schedule in the NASCAR Busch Series in 1993; the team closed mid-season, and he returned to sprint car racing once more. Swindell also competed in a full season of the NASCAR Craftsman Truck Series in 1995, driving for Akins-Sutton Motorsports; he finished 12th in points, scoring five top-ten finishes in the series' inaugural season.

2007 was Swindell's 35th consecutive year as a race car driver, racing beside his eighteen-year-old son Kevin. He's a five-time winner of the prestigious Chili Bowl Midget Nationals, the only driver to win it more than three times, until his son Kevin won his fourth straight race in 2013. During the 2008 season he raced in northern California winning a main event in the California Civil War Series in Placerville and also at the famed Silver Dollar Speedway in Chico, California. Swindell is considered one of the best driver/setup men in the business. He is known for experimenting with innovative technology.

Swindell's father Sam, was a successful driver and his brother Jeff, is still an active and successful sprint car driver.

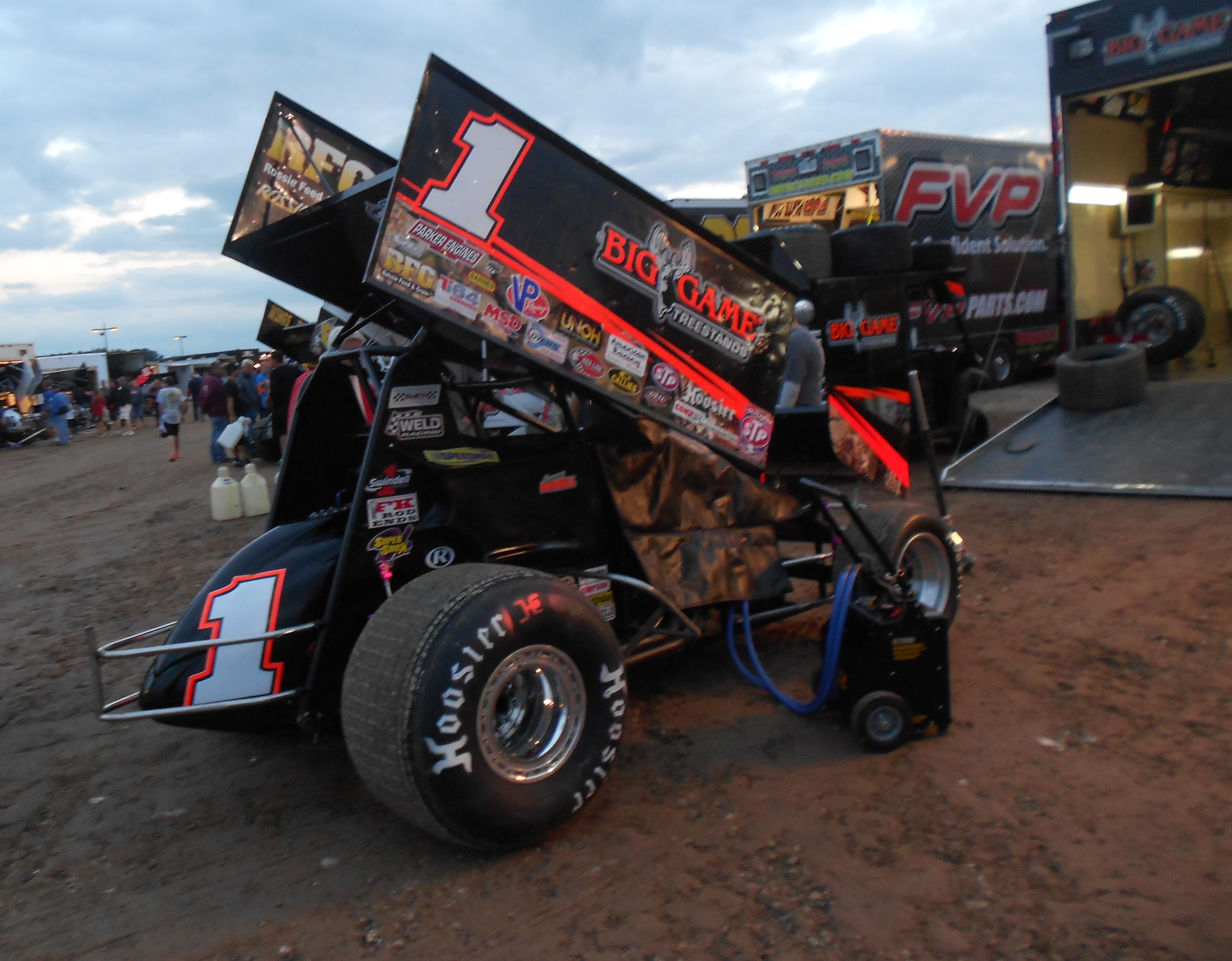
Sammy's 2013 car in the pits at the Beaver Dam Raceway.

On August 25, 2014, Swindell announced he was retiring from racing, though he intends to race in the Chili Bowl Nationals.

In 2015, Swindell made short work of retirement and signed with Chad and Jenn Clemens owners of CJB Motorsports out of Telford, Pennsylvania. Swindell ran a partial schedule and will do the same in 2016. He stated he has no intention of running a full schedule anymore, but picks and chooses the races he wants to run. This benefits the team with testing and keeps him active in the sport he loves. As of September 2020, he has 394 World of Outlaws Sprint Car wins.

Swindell continues to compete in various sprint car events. He scored two wins in 2023, his first wins in a sprint car since 2018. He also won a race in 2025. In July 2025, Swindell raced a pavement sprint car for the first time since 1992.

== Motorsports career results ==
=== World of Outlaws ===
- 1978: 9th in points – 2 wins
- 1979: 2nd in points – 11 wins
- 1980: 5th in points – 10 wins
- 1981: Champion – 28 wins
- 1982: Champion – 14 wins
- 1983: 3rd in points – 17 wins
- 1984: 2nd in points – 13 wins
- 1985: 7th in points – 14 wins
- 1986: 11th in points – 12 wins
- 1987: 12th in points – 6 wins
- 1988: 2nd in points – 8 wins
- 1990: 10th in points – 14 wins
- 1991: 9th in points – 15 wins
- 1992: 11th in points – 20 wins
- 1994: 5th in points – 7 wins
- 1995: 12th in points – 5 wins
- 1996: 3rd in points – 11 wins
- 1997: Champion – 19 wins
- 1998: 3rd in points – 7 wins
- 1999: 5th in points – 8 wins
- 2000: 2nd in points – 11 wins
- 2001: 18th in points – 2 wins
- 2002: 17th in points – 1 win
- 2003: 11th in points – 1 win
- 2004: 18th in points – 3 wins
- 2005: 19th in points – 3 wins
- 2006
- 2007
- 2008
- 2009: 13th in points – 0 wins
- 2010: 16th in points – 4 wins
- 2011: 12th in points – 4 wins
- 2012: 3rd in points – 13 wins
- 2013: 6th in points – 3 wins
- 2014: 14th in points – 2 wins
- 2015: 16th in points – 0 wins
- 2016: 16th in points – 0 wins
- 2017: 74th in points – 0 wins
- 2018: 57th in points – 0 wins
- 2019: 45th in points – 0 wins
- 2020: 38th in points – 0 wins
- 2021: 188th in points – 0 wins
- 2022: 93rd in points – 0 wins
- 2024: 134th in points – 0 wins

=== Indy Car World Series ===
(key) (Races in bold indicate pole position)

| Year | Team | 1 | 2 | 3 | 4 | 5 | 6 | 7 | 8 | 9 | 10 | 11 | 12 | 13 | 14 | 15 | 16 | 17 | Rank | Points | Ref |
|---|---|---|---|---|---|---|---|---|---|---|---|---|---|---|---|---|---|---|---|---|---|
| 1985 | Patrick Racing | LBH | INDY | MIL | POR | MEA | CLE | MCH; 23 | ROA | POC; 25 | MOH | SAN | MCH | LAG | PHX | MIA | | | **53rd** | **0** | |
| 1986 | A. J. Foyt Racing | PHX | LBH | INDY | MIL | POR | MEA | CLE | TOR | MIC | POC; 9 | MOH | SAN | MIC | ROA | LAG | PHX | MIA | **29th** | **4** | |
| 1987 | Machinists Union Racing | LBH | PHX | INDY; DNQ | MIL | POR | MEA | CLE | TOR | MIC | POC | ROA | MOH | NAZ | LAG | MIA | | | NC | - | |

=== NASCAR ===
(key) (Bold – Pole position awarded by qualifying time. Italics – Pole position earned by points standings or practice time. * – Most laps led.)

==== Winston Cup Series ====
NASCAR Winston Cup Series results
| Year | Team | No. | Make | 1 | 2 | 3 | 4 | 5 | 6 | 7 | 8 | 9 | 10 | 11 | 12 | 13 | 14 | 15 | 16 | 17 | 18 | 19 | 20 | 21 | 22 | 23 | 24 | 25 | 26 | 27 | 28 | 29 | NWCC | Pts | Ref |
|---|---|---|---|---|---|---|---|---|---|---|---|---|---|---|---|---|---|---|---|---|---|---|---|---|---|---|---|---|---|---|---|---|---|---|---|
| 1985 | Blue Max Racing | 72 | Pontiac | DAY | RCH | CAR | ATL | BRI | DAR | NWS | MAR | TAL | DOV | CLT | RSD | POC | MCH | DAY | POC | TAL | MCH | BRI | DAR | RCH | DOV | MAR | NWS | CLT | CAR | ATL; 30 | RSD | | 100th | 73 | |
| 1991 | Moroso Racing | 20 | Olds | DAY; 41 | RCH; Wth^{†} | CAR | ATL | DAR | BRI | NWS | MAR | TAL | CLT | DOV | SON | POC | MCH | DAY | POC | TAL | GLN | MCH | BRI | DAR | RCH | DOV | MAR | NWS | CLT | CAR | PHO | ATL | 90th | 40 | |
^{†} - Fired after first round qualifying and replaced by Bobby Hillin Jr.

===== Daytona 500 =====
| Year | Team | Manufacturer | Start | Finish |
|---|---|---|---|---|
| 1991 | Moroso Racing | Oldsmobile | 32 | 41 |

==== Busch Series ====
NASCAR Busch Series results
| Year | Team | No. | Make | 1 | 2 | 3 | 4 | 5 | 6 | 7 | 8 | 9 | 10 | 11 | 12 | 13 | 14 | 15 | 16 | 17 | 18 | 19 | 20 | 21 | 22 | 23 | 24 | 25 | 26 | 27 | 28 | 29 | 30 | 31 | NBGNC | Pts | Ref |
|---|---|---|---|---|---|---|---|---|---|---|---|---|---|---|---|---|---|---|---|---|---|---|---|---|---|---|---|---|---|---|---|---|---|---|---|---|---|
| 1984 | Blue Max Racing | 27 | Pontiac | DAY; 12 | RCH | CAR | HCY | MAR | DAR | ROU | NSV | LGY | MLW | DOV | | | | | | | | | | | | | | | | | | | | | 69th | 200 | |
| 1984 | Blue Max Racing | 27 | Olds | | | | | | | | | | | | CLT; 30 | SBO | HCY | ROU | SBO | ROU | HCY | IRP | LGY | SBO | BRI | DAR | RCH | NWS | CLT | HCY | CAR | MAR | | | 69th | 200 | |
| 1985 | Blue Max Racing | 27 | Pontiac | DAY; 20 | CAR | HCY | BRI | MAR | DAR | SBO | LGY | DOV | CLT; 32 | SBO | HCY | ROU | IRP | SBO | LGY | HCY | MLW | BRI | DAR | RCH | NWS | ROU | | | | | | | | | 61st | 216 | |
| 1985 | Blue Max Racing | 77 | Pontiac | | | | | | | | | | | | | | | | | | | | | | | | CLT; 39 | HCY | CAR | MAR | | | | | 61st | 216 | |
| 1986 | Barcomb Racing | 51 | Pontiac | DAY; 17 | CAR | HCY | MAR | BRI | DAR | SBO | LGY | JFC | DOV | CLT | SBO | HCY | ROU | IRP | SBO | RAL | OXF | SBO | HCY | LGY | ROU | BRI | DAR | RCH | DOV | MAR | ROU | CLT | CAR | MAR | 91st | 112 | |
| 1993 | TMC Racing Team | 26 | Ford | DAY | CAR | RCH | DAR; 21 | BRI | HCY | ROU | MAR | NZH | CLT | DOV; 19 | MYB | GLN | MLW; 20 | TAL | IRP; 34 | MCH | NHA | BRI | DAR | RCH | DOV | ROU | CLT | MAR | CAR | HCY | ATL | | | | 56th | 370 | |

==== SuperTruck Series ====
NASCAR SuperTruck Series results
| Year | Team | No. | Make | 1 | 2 | 3 | 4 | 5 | 6 | 7 | 8 | 9 | 10 | 11 | 12 | 13 | 14 | 15 | 16 | 17 | 18 | 19 | 20 | NSTSC | Pts | Ref |
|---|---|---|---|---|---|---|---|---|---|---|---|---|---|---|---|---|---|---|---|---|---|---|---|---|---|---|
| 1995 | Akins-Sutton Motorsports | 38 | Ford | PHO; 17 | TUS; 7 | SGS; 24 | MMR; 10 | POR; 13 | EVG; 17 | I70; 24 | LVL; 13 | BRI; 4^{*} | MLW; 12 | CNS; 26 | HPT; 21 | IRP; 33 | FLM; 10 | RCH; 17 | MAR; 36 | NWS; 24 | SON; 10 | MMR; 32 | PHO; 39 | 12th | 2109 | |

=== Trans-Am Championship ===
SCCA Trans Am Championship results
| Year | Team | No. | Make | 1 | 2 | 3 | 4 | 5 | 6 | 7 | 8 | 9 | 10 | 11 | 12 | Pos | Pts |
|---|---|---|---|---|---|---|---|---|---|---|---|---|---|---|---|---|---|
| 1987 | Rocketsports | 81 | Oldsmobile Toronado | LBX | SON | PIR | DET | MOH | BIR | LRP | ROA | MEM; 6 | MSP | RAT | SPG | 31st | 10 |

Sporting positions
| Preceded by Steve Kinser | World of Outlaws Champion; 1981, 1982 | Succeeded by Steve Kinser |
| Preceded by Mark Kinser | World of Outlaws Champion; 1997 | Succeeded by Steve Kinser |
