= Kasey Kahne Racing =

Sprint car racing team

- Team principal(s): Kasey Kahne; Mike Curb
- Current series: World of Outlaws Sprint Car Series
- Former series: USAC
- Current drivers: No. 9 Kasey Kahne; No. 49 Brad Sweet
- Drivers' Championships: 6 (2013, 2019, 2020, 2021, 2022, 2023)
- Website: Official website

The Kasey Kahne owned Kasey Kahne Racing with Mike Curb team originated in Mooresville, North Carolina. The N.C based company was formed in 2005 and employs over 15 people dedicated to sprint car racing. KKR fields two full-time entries in the World of Outlaws Sprint Car Series, the No. 49 for Brad Sweet and the No. 9 for Kasey Kahne. The team has over 140 Outlaw wins and has won six Outlaw titles, five consecutive titles in 2019, 2020, 2021, 2022, and 2023 with Brad Sweet, in addition to the 2013 championship with Daryn Pittman. KKR has won the prestigious Kings Royal three times, in 2006 with Joey Saldana and in 2013 and 2019 with Brad Sweet. KKR also won the Knoxville Nationals in 2019 with Sweet.

== Sprint Car No. 4 ==
=== Cody Darrah (2013–2014) ===
Cody Darrah drove the No. 4 from 2013 to 2015. He also drove the Nos. 89 and 91 for KKR.

== Sprint Car No. 9 ==
=== Joey Saldana (2006–2012) ===
Joey Saldana drove the number 9 full-time from 2006 to 2012.

In 2006, Saldana collected 7 wins, including the Kings Royal, finishing third in points. In 2007, he collected 12 wins and finished second in points behind Donny Schatz. In 2008, he had 5 wins, finishing fourth in standings. In 2009, despite collecting 20 feature wins, Saldana finished 3rd in standings.

For the 2011 season, Red Bull, which owned and sponsored Kahne's No. 4 NASCAR Cup Series car, sponsored Saldana's No. 9 sprint car. In July, at the Kings Royal at Eldora, Saldana suffered a horrible crash, in which he sustained a shattered right forearm, a punctured lung and five broken ribs in the scary crash. Despite this, Saldana returned to racing a little over two months later at Hartford Motor Speedway.

Throughout Saldana's tenure in the No. 9, the car was primarily sponsored by Budweiser, which had sponsored Kahne's No. 9 NASCAR Sprint Cup car.

=== Daryn Pittman (2013–2018) ===
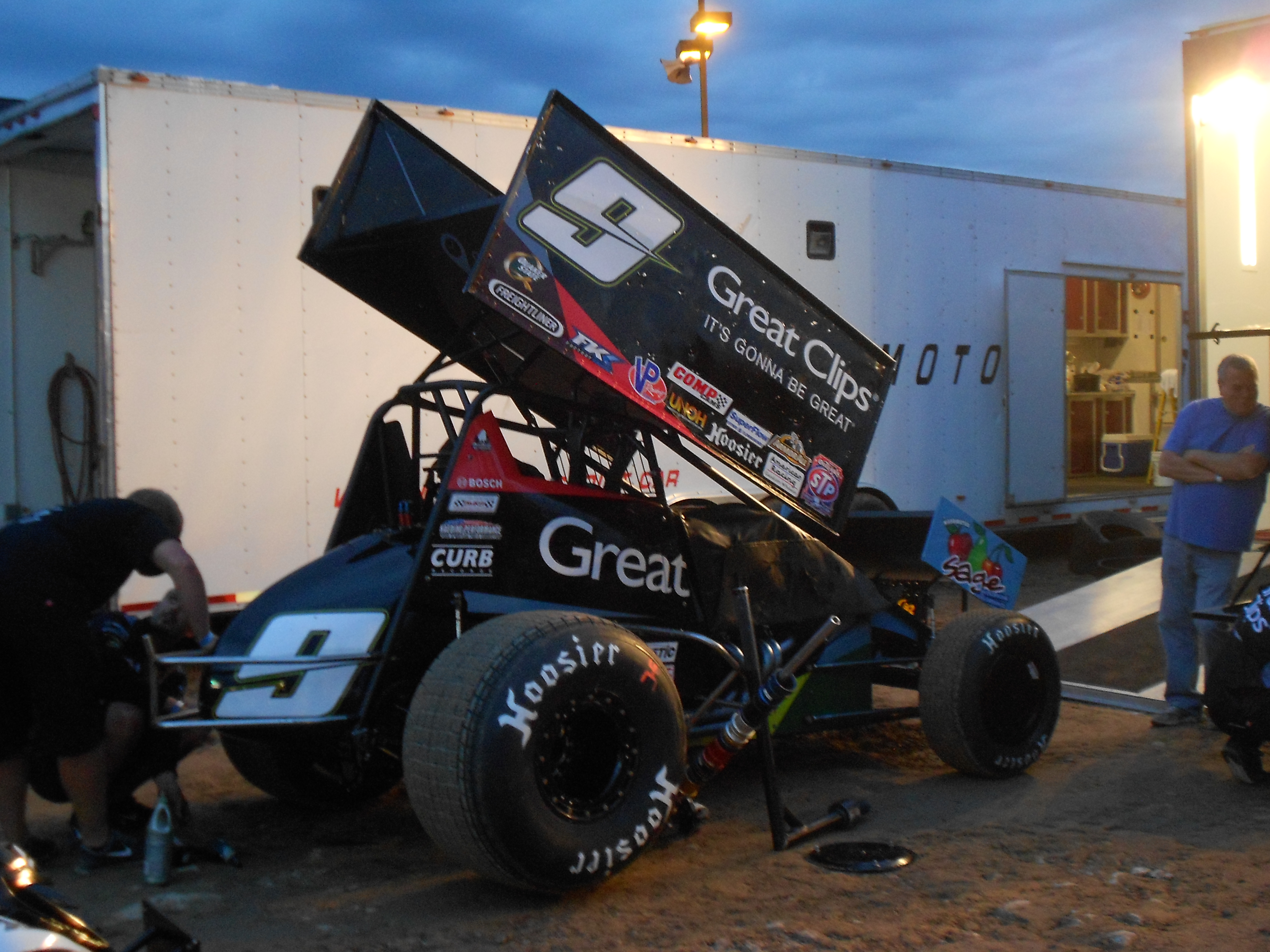
Daryn Pittman's 2013 Championship Car

Daryn Pittman drove the number 9 full-time from 2013 until 2018. Pittman won the 2013 World of Outlaws championship with KKR by leading the points from start to finish. Pittman followed up his championship season in 2014 with 14 wins, 50 top-five finishes and completed the season second in the championship standings. In 2015, after missing a couple of races due to injury, Pittman finished the season third in year ending points. In 2016, the team rebounded with eight wins and second in the points standings. Pittman won three races and finished fourth in the standings in 2017. In 2018 he grabbed 9 wins and once again finished fourth in standings.

=== James McFadden (2019–2021) ===
James McFadden drove the No. 9 part-time starting in 2019, going full-time in 2021. McFadden scored a single win in 2020 while driving part-time.

At the start of the 2021 season, James McFadden had to return to Australia for the birth of his son. Kahne ran the first six races of 2021 in the No. 9 in place of McFadden, including earning a top-five at Magnolia Motor Speedway after starting 23rd. McFadden finished out 2021 7th in points with two wins.

After 2021 he moved to the Roth Motorsports No. 83, switching rides with team owner Kasey Kahne, who replaced him in the No. 9.

=== Kasey Kahne (2019, 2021–present) ===
Team owner Kasey Kahne drives the No. 9 FuelMe/Karavan sprint car full-time in the 2023 season. Kahne began racing full-time in the 2022 season and had previously filled in the No. 9 in select races for James McFadden in 2021. Kahne finished out the 2022 season in 14th place in the standings, with 2 top-fives and 6 top-tens.

== Sprint Car No. 49 ==
=== Brad Sweet (2013–present) ===
Brad Sweet drives the No. 49 NAPA Auto Parts/CURB sprint car in the 2022 Outlaws season. He joined World of Outlaws ranks for KKR in 2013, showing no signs of slowing down, winning the prestigious King's Royal. 2014 was another breakthrough season for Sweet as he scored rookie-of-the-year honors and five feature wins. Sweet continued to be a threat on the World of Outlaws Series in 2015 with five wins, 31 top-five finishes, 60 top-ten finishes and two quick time awards. In 2016 Sweet won a career high eight races and also captured a series high 13 quick time awards. 2017 saw Sweet and the NAPA AUTO PARTS team capture five wins 72 top-ten finishes on their way to second in the season standings. In 2018 he got 8 wins. He had a runner up in the Kings Royal to Donny Schatz. When it came time to the Knoxville Nationals it would flip as Sweet would win with a cool $150,000 payday. He won the return to the Terre Haute Action Track. Brad Sweet and his Ollie's Bargain Outlet/Sage Fruit/ASE team won Rookie of the Year honors while winning five features that same season. Sweet won the Kings Royal in 2019.

Sweet won five consecutive World of Outlaws titles in 2019, 2020, 2021, 2022 and 2023.
