= High Limit Racing =

American motorsports circuit

- Sport: Sprint car racing
- Jurisdiction: United States
- Founded: 2022
- CEO: Kyle Larson & Brad Sweet

Official website
- www.highlimitracing.com
- Other key staff: Kendra Jacobs

The High Limit Racing series, currently known as Interstate Batteries High Limit Racing for sponsorship reasons, is an American touring sprint car racing series. It was founded in 2022 by five-time World of Outlaws sprint car series champion Brad Sweet and two-time and current NASCAR Cup Series champion Kyle Larson.

== Overview ==
Brad Sweet and Kyle Larson first announced the creation of the series in July 2022. The 2023 inaugural season consisted of 12 events, which were all held mid-week. Kyle Larson was crowned the series' first champion, winning three of the 12 races scheduled.

In late 2023 High Limit acquired the All Star Circuit of Champions sprint car racing series from former owner Tony Stewart. The series did not compete in 2024, but returned for 2025 with Fremont Speedway veteran Rich Farmer promoting a separate regional series.

In 2024, Larson and Sweet expanded the High Limit schedule to more than 50 race nights and increased the purse to $5 million in total prize money for the season. Kubota also assumed the naming rights for the series. Sweet claimed the 2024 championship after winning 10 races.

In 2025, High Limit aired its first race on FS1, marking the first time a race was seen on national TV.

Ahead of the 2026 season, Interstate Batteries became the new title sponsor.

== Champions ==
| Season | Winning driver | Event Wins |
|---|---|---|
| 2026 | Rico Abreu | 9 |
| 2025 | Rico Abreu | 13 |
| 2024 | Brad Sweet | 10 |
| 2023 | Kyle Larson* | 3 |

- * High Limit Racing did not become a nationally touring series until 2024.

== Current High Rollers ==
The 2026 season consists of 15 full time drivers, also known as High Rollers.

| Number | Driver | Team |
|---|---|---|
| 5 | Brenham Crouch | CJB Motorsports |
| 7BC | Tyler Courtney | Clauson Marshall Racing |
| 9 | Daison Pursley | Kasey Kahne Racing |
| 9R | Chase Randall | Chase Randall Racing |
| 13 | Tanner Holmes | Buch Motorsports |
| 17GP | Brock Zearfoss* | Michael Dutcher Motorsports |
| 19 | Brent Marks | Brent Marks Racing |
| 24 | Rico Abreu | Tony Stewart Racing |
| 24D | Danny Sams III | Randerson Racing Company |
| 26 | Justin Peck | Rudeen Racing |
| 42 | Sye Lynch | Mosites Lynch Racing |
| 55 | Kerry Madsen | Vermeer Motorsports |
| 77 | Giovanni Scelzi | Spire Motorsports |
| 87 | Aaron Reutzel | Ridge and Son Racing |
| 88 | Tanner Thorson | Rod Gross Motorsports |

- * Brock Zearfoss replaced Hank Davis, who parted ways with Michael Dutcher Motorsports earlier in the season.

== Franchise system ==
The series created a Franchise System to give team owners enterprise value, awarding 10 charters total over the 2024 and 2025 seasons, with the first batch going to the top five full-time teams in the year-end points championship of 2024. The five that get awarded after the 2025 season will go to the highest finishing teams that didn't already have a franchise, based on their average year-end points totals from the 2024 and 2025 seasons. A pathway will be possible for up to five additional teams to enter the Franchise System over the 2026-27 seasons, creating up to 15 franchisees. Media revenue distribution will then start in 2026. The chartered teams will get 50% of High Limit's digital streaming revenue annually. Under the terms of the system teams must compete in every race.

== High Limit Events (Scheduled) ==
Scheduled High Limit Events in 2025 (note some events did not take place due to cancellations)
- High Limit events
