= Joey Saldana =

American racing driver

Joey Saldana (born March 14, 1972), known as "'the Brownsburg Bullet", is an American sprint car racing driver. He is the son of former sprint car and Indy car driver Joe Saldana.

Saldana began racing at the local Indiana tracks close to his home in the early 1990s. He then moved up to the All Star Circuit of Champions, where he won 18 races in 1995. He ran occasionally with the World of Outlaws winning his first race with the series in 1995 and then began touring full-time with the series in 1996 capturing Rookie of the Year honors. He finished third in points in 2003 and 2006 and second in 2007. He won 20 races (one of only six racers to do so in a season) in 2009 on his way to third in points for Kasey Kahne's race team. He finished fourth in points in 2010 with 13 wins driving for the same team. He was contending for the 2011 title when he broke his arm, ribs and punctured a lung at the King's Royal race in July which caused him to be out for nine weeks.

Saldana parted ways with Kasey Kahne Racing at the end of the 2012 season and teamed up with Dan and Ruth Motter of the famed yellow Motter Motorsports Sprint Car Team from 2013 to 2015. The Motter family due to lack of sponsorship scaled back their racing schedule leaving Joey looking for a ride the following year. He took the checkered flag for 11 WoO races and one All Star race, and a series best 48 Top-Qualifier awards in his three years in the seat of the Motter Motorsports entry from 2013 to 2015. Saldana wrapped up his three-year run with Motter Motorsports by notching his 100th career WoO win at Charlotte, North Carolina, on November 8, 2015.

Saldana moved back to a previous seat (1996, 2001) for the 2016 season in the Roth Motorsports #83 team owned by Dennis and Teresa Roth. Even with numerous crew changes, he was able to pilot the famed maroon-colored Roth No. 83 to five WoO wins, 62 top-ten finishes, and a fifth-place finish in WoO season points.

For 2017, Saldana joined forces with Stenhouse Jr/Wood Racing. This team was made up of Matt Wood Racing and Ricky Stenhouse Jr. https://www.facebook.com/SJWRacing/ In late June of that year, Saldana left the team and raced with the Indy Race Parts #71 with great success, winning several ASCoC races.

For 2018, Saldana signed on with Kevin Rudeen Racing out of Monroe, WA. They would run a pick and choose schedule of WoO and other races to fill out his true outlaw schedule.

Saldana has finished second in the Knoxville Nationals three times. Joey has won events such as the Devil's Bowl Speedway Winter and Summer Nationals, Silver Dollar Speedway's Gold Cup, Eldora Speedway's 4 Crown Sprint Nationals, and I-55 Speedway's inaugural Iron Man 55 which is the longest race on the season. His father Joe Saldana won the esteemed Knoxville Nationals race in 1970. Joey has distinguished himself as one of the greatest sprint car drivers of his generation. The future Sprint Car Hall of Famer grew up watching his dad race. Saldana claims his dad Joe Saldana, Doug Wolfgang, and Lee Osborne as his racing heroes and mentors.

Saldana is one of only five drivers to ever win 20 features in a World of Outlaws season. He accomplished this remarkable feat in 2009.

During the mid-late 1990s, Saldana also raced in Australia in the World Series Sprintcars, racing for popular South Australian based former driver Bill Barrows. Racing the Barrows owned OTR (for Oval Track Racing, an Australian designed and built chassis), Joey finished second in the 1995/96 World Series Sprintcars behind multiple Australian Sprintcar Champion Brooke Tatnell.

In 2020, Saldana started up Saldana Racing Oil Tanks. His business model builds dry sump oil tanks and overflow catch cans for race engines. Primarily focusing on sprint car and midgets.

On December 16, 2022, it was announced Saldana was elected on his first ballot into the 2023 class of the National Sprint Car Hall of Fame.

Saldana is married to Shannon, and has two sons: Reece & Ragan.

== World of Outlaws career ==
Year	Points Finish	Wins	Awards & Accomplishments
1995	-	1	* Won first World of Outlaws Feature Event
1996	11th	0	Rookie of the Year
1997	18th	0	
1998	28th	1	
1999	19th	0	
2000	6th	3	
2001	7th	1	Winter Nationals Champion
2002	4th	7	Kings Royal Champion; Summer Nationals Champion
2003	3rd	2	
2004	6th	5	
2005	13th	1	
2006	3rd	7	Kings Royal Champion
2007	2nd	12	Brad Doty Classic Champion; Gold Cup Champion; 4 Crown Sprint Car Champion; Eagle Nationals Champion; Caterpillar Clash Champion
2008	4th	5	4 Crown Sprint Car Champion
2009	3rd	20	Iron Man 55 Champion; Gold Cup Champion
2010	4th	13	Dirt Car Nationals Champion
2011	11th	6	4 Crown Sprint Car Champion
2012	4th	5	NAPA SoCal Showdown; Night Before the Kings Royal
2013	4th	1	
2014	5th	7	4 Crown Sprint Car Champion
2015	6th	3	Bad Boy Buggies World Finals
2016	5th	5	FVP Outlaw Showdown; Texas Outlaw Nationals; FVP Missouri High-Banked Nationals
2017	17th	0	
2018	15th	0	

105 Total A-Main Wins: 7th All-time as of September 17, 2016

== All Star Circuit of Champions career ==
Saldana has posted 74 ASCoC career wins for 3rd place of All-time
