= Doug Wolfgang =

American racing driver

Doug Wolfgang (born July 26, 1952 in Sioux Falls, South Dakota) is a retired American racing driver. He holds 140 World of Outlaws sprint car series wins (fifth all-time), 37 All Star Circuit of Champions wins, and is a five-time Knoxville Nationals champion and two-time Kings Royal winner. He finished second in the Outlaws standings four times and had four seasons with over ten wins.

== Racing career ==
=== Early career ===
As a teenager, Wolfgang hung out and eventually worked for local racer Darryl Dawley's transmission shop. Wolfgang's first experience behind the wheel of a race car came in a B-modified at Huset's Speedway in 1970. His early goal was simply to make a living driving racecars. As he put it, "My design from day one was to become a full-time race car driver. Not to win Daytona, not to win Knoxville or Indianapolis--but to make my living in a race car." He began driving sprint cars in the mid-1970s with that aim in mind.

=== Sprint car racing ===
Wolfgang found his first regular sprint car seat with Dave Van Patten in the mid-1970s. Shortly thereafter, he teamed up with car owner Bob Trostle in 1976 and won 45 races the following year, including the Knoxville Nationals. Amid talk that Bill Smith was planning an Indy program, Wolfgang teamed with Smith in the Speedway Motors 4x. The team won 24 races in 1978 along with Wolfgang's second Knoxville Nationals. 1980 saw Wolfgang driving for Doug Howells, and the pair spent three seasons together, resulting in two second-place World of Outlaws point finishes. Wolfgang spent 1983 in the No. 18 Gambler house car owned by C. K. Spurlock, however despite 11 feature victories in that car, he was let go before the end of the year. It wasn't long before he found his way to Pennsylvania owner Bob Weikert, where he would remain for several years and raise the bar on sprint car racing success with a mind-boggling 52 wins in 1985. In his time with Weikert and mechanic Davey Brown, Sr., he won the Knoxville Nationals twice and the 1985 Kings Royal, as well as three straight victories at the Williams Grove National Open, but ran a varied schedule across multiple series and therefore his final position in the World of Outlaws standings from 1984 to 1987 was unremarkable. By 1988, Wolfgang felt the lure of a World of Outlaws title and left Pennsylvania to run full-time in that series in the Fred Marks/Les Kepler Kodiak No. 18. In 1989, he joined forces with 21-year-old team owner Danny Peace and ran a true outlaw pick and choose schedule, Wolfgang earned over $500,000 in prize money, 44 wins, and won his final Knoxville Nationals as well as a $50,000-to-win race at Selinsgrove. Wolfgang would grab his final major victory in 1990, winning the Kings Royal in the Ray & Jay Williams owned #8, before being released at the end of the year. He rejoined Max Rogers in 1991 for a reduced schedule, hitting the major races and otherwise staying relatively local.

=== Other racing series ===
Wolfgang took the checker flag in a USAC Midget race, two USAC Silver Crown races and three USAC Sprint car races. Doug claimed one victory in the NCRA 100-inch Champ Car division and an ASCS 360 Sprint division triumph. Wolfgang also claimed victory in a MARA midget race.

==== Injury ====
On April 3, 1992, Wolfgang was competing in a World of Outlaws event at Lakeside Speedway in Kansas City. During qualifying, he was involved in a fiery crash that resulted in burns over 30% of his body, a broken vertebrae, and injuries to his right hand. Following his recovery, upon climbing back into the seat, Wolfgang was never again as dominant as he had once been. Speaking about the incident, Wolfgang stated, "I have absolutely zero interest in getting hurt again. I've had all the fun I can handle with that. I also know what it takes to win, and I guarantee you I don't have that anymore." While he would never again be a dominant force in the World of Outlaws, he did go on to win the IMCA 360 sprint car championship in 1996 and the ASCS 360 National race in 1996 before retiring in 1997 after a second serious crash, this time in Granite City, Illinois.

==== Knoxville Nationals ====
Wolfgang is a five-time Knoxville Nationals champion. His first, in 1977, was with Bob Trostle. He followed that up with Bill Smith in 1978, Bob Weikert in 1984 & 1985, and Danny Peace in 1989. In 1990, he famously "ran the alphabet", advancing from the D-main, through the C & B, to finish fifth in the A-feature driving the Williams Racing #8.

=== Awards and recognition ===
Wolfgang won 481 sprint car races for 17 car owners in 29 states at 105 tracks. He was inducted into numerous Hall of Fames. His career was cut short from two near-fatal accidents in 1992 and 1997.

- National Sprint Car Hall of Fame inductee, 2003
- South Dakota Sports Hall of Fame inductee, 2007
- Nebraska Auto Racing Hall of Fame inductee, 2002
- National Sprint Car Poll Driver of the Year, 1985 & 1989
- National Motor Press Association Driver of the Year, 1985

== Motorsports career results ==
(key)

=== World of Outlaws ===
Year	Owner	Wins	Finish	Points
1978	Bill Smith	3	4th	3024
1979	Bob Trostle/Bill Smith	8	5th	5988
1980	Doug Howells	10	2nd	9000
1981	Doug Howells	20	2nd	10292
1982	Doug Howells/Gary Stanton	6	6th	5123
1983	C.K. Spurlock/Lavern Nance	3	2nd	6832
1984	Lavern Nance/Doug Howells/Bob Weikert	1	13th	4017
1985	Bob Weikert	6	15th	2643
1986	Bob Weikert	4	15th	3010
1987	Bob Weikert	2	20th	3225
1988	Fred Marks & Les Kepler	6	9th	7655
1989	Danny Peace	20	9th	5508
1990	Ray & Jay Williams	11	2nd	9899
1991	Max Rogers	6	14th	4814

=== Knoxville Nationals ===
Year	Car #	Owner	Finish
1977	20	Bob Trostle	1
1978	4x	Speedway Motors	1
1979	4x	Speedway Motors	17
1980	4	Doug Howells	C-main
1981	4	Doug Howells	3
1982	75	Gary Stanton	2
1983	18	C. K. Spurlock	2
1984	29	Bob Weikert	1
1985	29	Bob Weikert	1
1986	29	Bob Weikert	3
1987	29	Bob Weikert	B-main
1988	18	Fred Marks & Les Kepler	5
1989	8D	Danny Peace	1
1990	8	Ray & Jay Williams	5
1991	49	Max Rogers	7

=== Kings Royal ===
Year	Car #	Owner	Finish
1984	29	Bob Weikert	6
1985	29	Bob Weikert	1
1986	29	Bob Weikert	6
1987	29	Bob Weikert	2
1988	18	Fred Marks & Les Kepler	DNF
1989	8D	Danny Peace	19
1990	8	Ray & Jay Williams	1
1991	49	Max Rogers	22
