= All Star Circuit of Champions =

American motorsports circuit

- Sport: Sprint car racing
- Jurisdiction: United States
- Abbreviation: ASCoC
- Founded: 1970
- Regional affiliation: High Limit Racing
- Affiliation date: 2024
- Headquarters: Fremont, Ohio
- Director: Rich Farmer

Official website
- www.allstarsprintcar.com

The All Star Circuit of Champions (abbreviated ASCoC) is an American motorsports sanctioning body of winged sprint car racing. It was founded in 1970 and purchased by Tony Stewart in the winter of 2015. High Limit Racing acquired the series from Stewart at the conclusion of their 2023 season.

== History ==
The ASCoC was founded by Bud Miller in 1970 after a failed venture by himself, Chris Economaki, and Wellman Lehman, to build a new race track near Youngstown, OH. Through the meetings about building the track the idea was conceived to create a touring sprint car series in the area. The idea of the All Star Circuit of Champions was then born in 1970 and began operating that year. The series was dormant in 1971 and 1972 and suspended operations after the 1973 season, when the 1973 oil crisis triggered fuel price increases and shortages.

The series would reform in 1979 with new owner, Bert Emick. Emick lost the rights to the MOSS sanctioning body in the Ohio area. He brought back the All Star name in 1980. Emick would run the series until 2002 when Guy Webb took over.

Joey Saldana set a series record with 18 wins in 1995 piloting the Art Wendt 77w.

Guy Webb took over as owner in 2002, running the series for 12 years. In January 2015, Webb sold the series to former NASCAR driver Tony Stewart.

== Tony Stewart ownership ==
Stewart took sole ownership of the ASCoC in 2015 after an organization called Renegade Sprints competed with Webb's group. Stewart brought the two groups back together in under the All Star banner.

In January 2016 it was announced that the series gained Arctic Cat as the series title sponsor.

The series had 29 different winners in 2017. Chad Kemenah would control the 2017 season and back up the 2016 championship with his 6th championship in 2017, tying Dale Blaney for most titles in series history. 19 different drivers won in 2018. Aaron Reutzel from Clute, TX took on the series full-time and was crowned champion after a 9 win season.

In December 2018, MAVTV announced they had acquired the rights to broadcast the highlights of select events. Starting in 2020, all races are broadcast live in full on FloSports.

Ollie's Bargain Outlet took over title sponsorship of the series beginning in 2019, sharing naming rights with Mobil 1. FloRacing became the title sponsor for the 2021 season. The following season, Tezos assumed naming rights on a three-year deal.

== High Limit ownership ==
On October 23, 2023, High Limit Racing announced the acquisition of the All Star Circuit of Champions.

The series did not compete in 2024, but for 2025 the High Limit Racing co-founders Brad Sweet and Kyle Larson partnered with promoter Rich Farmer to reinstate the regional series and continue Ohio Sprint Speedweek. Most of the races are set to be held in Ohio, with additional visits to Indiana, Michigan, New York and Pennsylvania.

== Champions ==
Year	Driver	Wins	Year	Driver	Wins	Year	Driver	Wins
1970	Ralph Quarterson	2	1996	Dale Blaney	17	2014	Dale Blaney	16
1973	Jan Opperman	3	1997	Frankie Kerr	4	2015	Dale Blaney	12
1980	Bobby Allen	6	1998	Kenny Jacobs	11	2016	Chad Kemenah	1
1981	Lee Osborne	4	1999	Kenny Jacobs	7	2017	Chad Kemenah	3
1982	Lee Osborne	6	2000	Kenny Jacobs	6	2018	Aaron Reutzel	9
1983	Lee Osborne	5	2001	Kenny Jacobs	5	2019	Aaron Reutzel	16
1984	Fred Linder	1	2002	Chad Kemenah	2	2020	Aaron Reutzel	11
1985	Jack Hewitt	12	2003	Chad Kemenah	5	2021	Tyler Courtney	8
1986	Fred Linder	0	2004	Chad Kemenah	6	2022	Tyler Courtney	8
1987	Joe Gaerte	4	2005	Chad Kemenah	8	2023	Zeb Wise	9
1988	Joe Gaerte	6	2006	Greg Wilson	1	2025	Kalib Henry	4
1989	Robbie Stanley	3	2007	Greg Wilson	1			
1990	Terry Shepherd	0	2008	Dale Blaney	9			
1991	Frankie Kerr	5	2009	Tim Shaffer	8			
1992	Kevin Huntley	14	2010	Tim Shaffer	16			
1993	Kevin Huntley/Frankie Kerr	6/5	2011	Tim Shaffer	10			
1994	Frankie Kerr	12	2012	Tim Shaffer	6			
1995	Dale Blaney	12	2013	Dale Blaney	6			

== Notable drivers ==
- Dale Blaney, 137 wins, 6 championships
- Kenny Jacobs, 98 wins, 4 championships
- Joey Saldana, 74 wins
- Tim Shaffer, 58 wins, 4 championships
- Jack Hewitt, 56 wins, 1 championship
- Frankie Kerr, 53 wins, 4 championships
- Dave Blaney, 48 wins
- Bobby Allen, 46 wins, 1 championship
- Kevin Huntley, 44 wins
- Kelly Kinser, 42 wins
- Jeff Shepard, 40 wins
- Steve Kinser, 37 wins
- Doug Wolfgang, 37 wins
- Danny Lasoski, 37 wins
- Rickey Hood, 34 wins
- Chad Kemenah, 33 wins, 6 championships
- Aaron Reutzel, 25 wins, 3 championships
- Lee Osborne, 17 wins, 3 championships

== Series owners ==
- C.H. "Bud" Miller (1970–1973)
- Bert Emick (1980–2002)
- Guy Webb (2002–2015)
- Tony Stewart (2015–2023)
- Kyle Larson and Brad Sweet (2023-)
