= World of Outlaws =

Car racing organization

World of Outlaws NOS Energy Drink Sprint Car Series
- The Greatest Show on Dirt
- Category: Sprint car racing
- Country: United States; Canada
- Inaugural season: 1978
- Drivers: 356 (2017)
- Tire suppliers: Continental AG
- Drivers' champion: David Gravel
- Makes' champion: Maxim
- Teams' champion: Big Game Motorsports
- Official website: World of Outlaws NOS Energy Drink Sprint Car Series

World of Outlaws Sprint Car Series, originally known as the World of Outlaws (often abbreviated WoO) is an American national touring dirt track racing series. It is owned and operated by World Racing Group, and was rebranded when the World of Outlaws Late Model Series was introduced. The Sprint Car Series has been sponsored by Monster Beverage's NOS Energy Drink since 2019.

== Overview ==
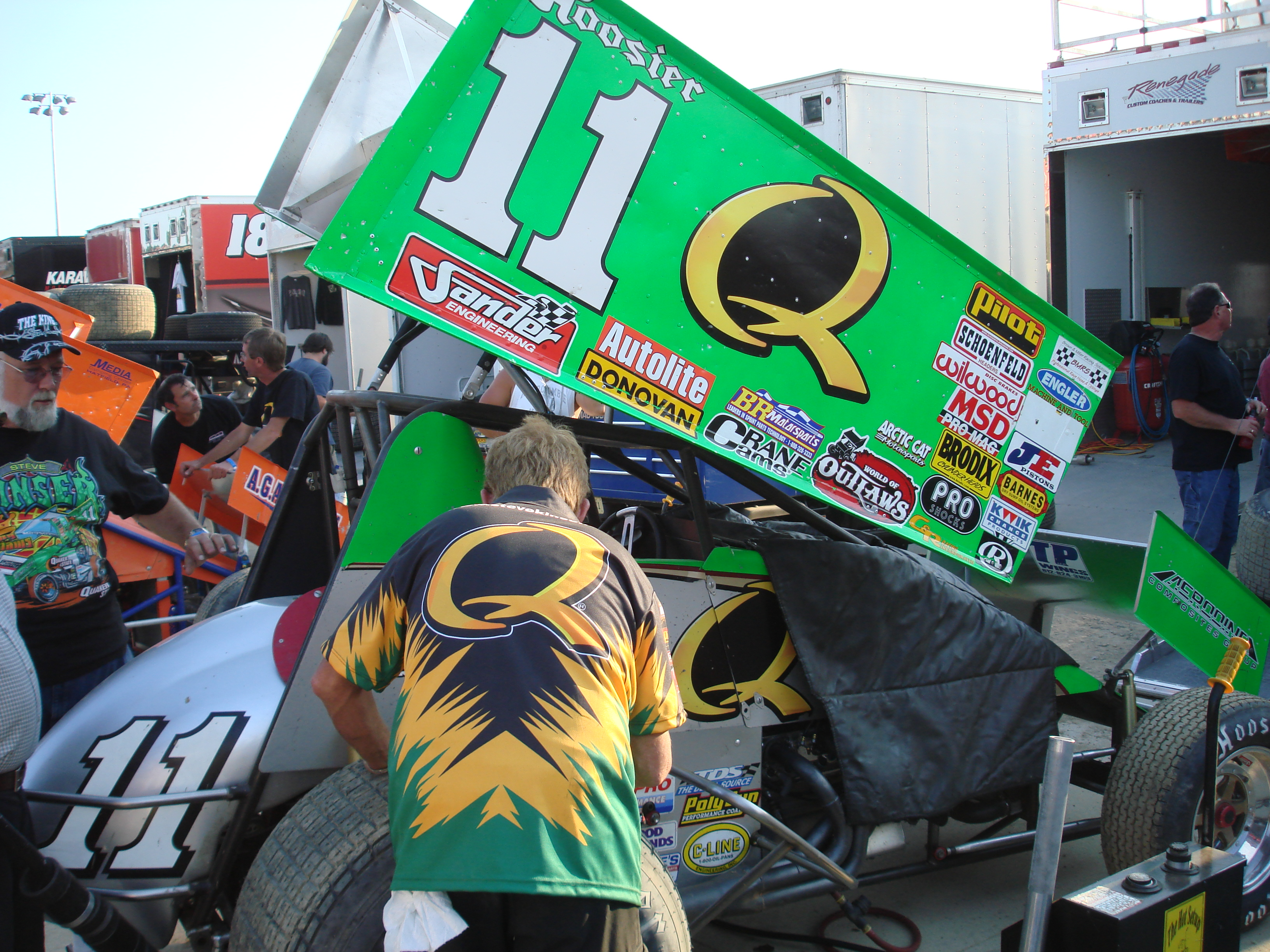
Steve Kinser's 2007 World of Outlaws sprint car at the King's Royal race

The series is a national tour of high power to weight, custom fabricated sprint cars. The race cars feature large adjustable wings on the top and large rear tires that transfer their power to the dirt tracks they race on. The series travels primarily the United States, but has sanctioned races in Canada, Mexico, and Australia. The series was founded in 1978 by Ted Johnson, a former midget racer from Madison, Wisconsin. At the time sprint car racing in the United States lacked a true national series. Johnson organized the World of Outlaws sanctioning body and established a national schedule, a set of rules and a points system to crown a champion of his series.

In 2003, Johnson sold the series to Boundless Motor Sports Racing, later renamed Dirt Motorsports and currently World Racing Group (WRG). In 2004 WRG extended its subscription-based streaming service (DIRTVision), to the Outlaw series. It originally offered radio broadcasts of all races, and added video streaming to select races, until reaching the full calendar in 2018. Select races are broadcast on delay nationally on the CBS Sports Network with MavTV showing the Knoxville Nationals since 2013. Previous broadcasters include The Nashville Network and Speed Channel shown live or on delay.

=== Sprint car specifications ===
A WoO Sprint Car must weigh at least 1,425 pounds (646kg) with the driver in the car. The mandated 410-cubic inch engine (6.7 litre) produces over 900 horsepower, uses mechanical fuel injection and must run on methanol fuel. The series' specification tire manufacturer works with the World of Outlaws to designate legal tire compounds for a circuit among different compounds available to competitors, as the tire must suitably respond to the track surface. Tire technicians will reject certain compounds at certain circuits if they are unfit for the surface or may provide an unfair advantage. The series' cars have a large top mounted wing with sideboards that face opposite directions to help produce a great amount of downforce to help the car turn and maximize grip, both in the corners and on the straightaways. The cars also have smaller wings on the nose to provide more downforce to the front wheels.

Sprint cars use "quick change" rear ends. This allows the teams to quickly change the gear ratio for different size tracks. Most cars use a torsion bar suspension system. Different size bars either soften or stiffen the suspension. Torsion bars, and specialty shock absorbers are the key ingredients in the handling of sprint cars. That coupled with the wings, tire stagger, light weight, and enormous horsepower make these cars some of the fastest race cars in the world. The monstrous power-to-weight ratios of Sprint Cars can exceed that of Formula 1 cars in the right circumstances.

Sprint Cars have a very distinct stance since they have two very different sized rear tires. The right rear tire on a sprint car is 105 inches in circumference. In contrast, the left rear tire is only between 90 and 98 inches in circumference, depending on the track size and conditions. The difference in the tire sizes is called stagger. The more stagger the car has, the sharper the car can turn, but at the expense of straight line speed. Sprint cars do not have starters, so push trucks are used to push the cars to start the engines. Sprint Cars only have an in/out direct drive with a fixed gear ratio, no reverse gear and no clutch.

=== Typical race night program ===
1. Motor Heat & Wheel pack
2. Hot laps (practice laps)
3. Time trials (time trials or qualifying, usually two laps with the fastest lap being the qualifying time)
4. Heat races (set based on qualifying time)
5. Toyota Dash (sets the top three or four rows of the fastest cars for the A-main)
6. Last Chance Showdown (B-Main, C-Main or D-Main depending on car count)
7. Feature (A-Main, which can be anywhere from 25 to 55 laps)

== Achievements ==
=== Past champions ===
Season	Driver	Team
2026	David Gravel	Big Game Motorsports
2025	David Gravel	Big Game Motorsports
2024	David Gravel	Big Game Motorsports
2023	Brad Sweet	Kasey Kahne Racing
2022	Brad Sweet	Kasey Kahne Racing
2021	Brad Sweet	Kasey Kahne Racing
2020	Brad Sweet	Kasey Kahne Racing
2019	Brad Sweet	Kasey Kahne Racing
2018	Donny Schatz	Tony Stewart Racing
2017	Donny Schatz	Tony Stewart Racing
2016	Donny Schatz	Tony Stewart Racing
2015	Donny Schatz	Tony Stewart Racing
2014	Donny Schatz	Tony Stewart Racing
2013	Daryn Pittman	Kasey Kahne Racing
2012	Donny Schatz	Tony Stewart Racing
2011	Jason Meyers	Elite Racing
2010	Jason Meyers	Elite Racing
2009	Donny Schatz	Tony Stewart Racing
2008	Donny Schatz	Tony Stewart Racing
2007	Donny Schatz	Donny Schatz Motorsports
2006	Donny Schatz	Donny Schatz Motorsports
2005	Steve Kinser	Steve Kinser Racing
2004	Steve Kinser	Steve Kinser Racing
2003	Steve Kinser	Steve Kinser Racing
2002	Steve Kinser	Steve Kinser Racing
2001	Danny Lasoski	Tony Stewart Racing
2000	Steve Kinser	Steve Kinser Racing
1999	Mark Kinser	Karl Kinser Racing
1998	Steve Kinser	Steve Kinser Racing
1997	Sammy Swindell	Swindell Motorsports
1996	Mark Kinser	Karl Kinser Racing
1995	Dave Blaney	Casey Luna Ford Racing
1994	Steve Kinser	Karl Kinser Racing
1993	Steve Kinser	Karl Kinser Racing
1992	Steve Kinser	Karl Kinser Racing
1991	Steve Kinser	Karl Kinser Racing
1990	Steve Kinser	Karl Kinser Racing
1989	Bobby Davis, Jr.	Casey Luna Ford Racing
1988	Steve Kinser	Karl Kinser Racing
1987	Steve Kinser	Karl Kinser Racing
1986	Steve Kinser	Karl Kinser Racing
1985	Steve Kinser	Karl Kinser Racing
1984	Steve Kinser	Karl Kinser Racing
1983	Steve Kinser	Karl Kinser Racing
1982	Sammy Swindell	Nance Speed Equipment
1981	Sammy Swindell	Nance Speed Equipment
1980	Steve Kinser	Karl Kinser Racing
1979	Steve Kinser	Karl Kinser Racing
1978	Steve Kinser	Karl Kinser Racing

=== Top 25 all-time A-Feature winners ===
Note: Includes all full-field preliminary race wins. Those with a yellow background indicates Knoxville National winners. Updated July 11, 2026.

Driver	Wins	Championships
1. Steve Kinser	690	20
2. Sammy Swindell	394	3
3. Donny Schatz	317	10
4. Mark Kinser	203	2
5. Doug Wolfgang	140	
6. David Gravel	127	3
7. Danny Lasoski	122	1
8. Joey Saldana	105	
9. Dave Blaney	95	1
10. Brad Sweet	93	5
11. Daryn Pittman	86	1
12. Stevie Smith	84	
13. Jac Haudenschild	72	
14. Bobby Davis Jr.	66	1
14. Craig Dollansky	66	
16. Carson Macedo	62	
17. Jason Meyers	58	2
18. Sheldon Haudenschild	52	
19. Jeff Swindell	51	
20. Logan Schuchart	45	
21. Andy Hillenburg	42	
22. Kyle Larson	39	
23. Shane Stewart	36	
24. Buddy Kofoid	31	
25. Bobby Allen	30	

=== World of Outlaws Kevin Gobrecht Rookie of the Year ===
Season	Driver
1979	Tim Green
1980	Bobby Davis, Jr.
1981	Jeff Swindell
1982	Brad Doty
1983	No award issued
1984	Mark Kinser, Greg Wooley
1985	No award issued
1986	Johnny Herrera
1987	Cris Eash
1988	Andy Hillenburg
1989	Joe Gaerte
1990	Stevie Smith
1991	Jim Carr
1992	Aaron Berryhill
1993	Greg Hodnett
1994	Sid Blandford
1995	Randy Hannagan
1996	Joey Saldana
1997	Donny Schatz
1998	Dale Blaney
1999	Tim Shaffer
2000	Danny Wood
2001	Jeff Shepard
2002	No award issued
2003	Jason Sides
2004	Kraig Kinser
2005	Shane Stewart
2006	Chad Kemenah
2007	Kerry Madsen
2008	Lucas Wolfe
2009	Brian Ellenberger
2010	Ben Gregg
2011	Cody Darrah
2012	No award issued
2013	David Gravel
2014	Brad Sweet
2015	Jason Johnson
2016	Greg Wilson
2017	Sheldon Haudenschild
2018	Ian Madsen
2019	Carson Macedo
2020	Wayne Johnson
2021	James McFadden
2022	Spencer Bayston
2023	Giovanni Scelzi
2024	Michael Kofoid
2025	Garet Williamson
2026	Emerson Axsom

=== Popular events ===
Here is a list of top paying and more popular race events each year. Most are two days or more.

Final night features are usually based on points earned on the previous night's races.

An asterisk marks single-day events where the entire program is run on one day.

Track	Event	Winner's purse
Eldora Speedway	* Kings Royal	$175,000
Knoxville Raceway	Knoxville Nationals	$150,000
Huset's Speedway	Huset's High Bank Nationals	$250,000
Eldora Speedway	Historical Big 1	$100,000
Williams Grove Speedway	National Open	$75,000
Jackson Motorplex	Jackson Nationals	$25,000
Skagit Speedway	Skagit Nationals	$25,000
Williams Grove Speedway	Summer Nationals	$25,000
Beaver Dam Speedway	Jim "JB" Boyd Memorial	$20,000
Federated Auto Parts Raceway at I-55	Ironman 55	$20,000
Devil's Bowl Speedway	Texas Outlaw Nationals	$20,000
Williams Grove Speedway	Summer Nationals	$20,000
Attica Raceway Park	* Brad Doty Classic	$15,000
Port Royal Speedway	Nittany Showdown	$15,000
Eldora Speedway	Knight Before the Kings Royal	$12,000
Silver Dollar Speedway	Gold Cup Race of Champions	$12,000
The Dirt Track at Charlotte	World Finals	$12,000

=== Notable drivers who have raced with the World of Outlaws Sprint Cars Series ===
Driver	
Steve Kinser	20-time series champion, 690 career WoO wins, 12-time Knoxville Nationals winner, "The King of Sprint Car Racing", National Sprint Car Hall of Fame member
Sammy Swindell	1981–1982, 1997 WoO Series champion, 394 WoO series wins, 1983 Knoxville Nationals winner, National Sprint Car Hall of Fame member
Doug Wolfgang	140 career WoO wins and 5-time Knoxville Nationals winner, 1976–1977 Knoxville Raceway track champion, National Sprint Car Hall of Fame member
Donny Schatz	10-time Series Champion, 306 career WoO wins, 11-time Knoxville Nationals winner.
Mark Kinser	1996 and 1999 WoO Series Champion, 203 WoO series wins, 3-time Knoxville Nationals winner, National Sprint Car Hall of Fame member
Danny Lasoski	2001 Champion, 122 WoO series wins, 4-time Knoxville Nationals winner, IROC race winner, 11-time Knoxville Raceway Champion, National Sprint Car Hall of Fame member
Joey Saldana	105 career WoO wins, won 20 feature events in 2009, 2-time Kings Royal winner, 2-time Gold Cup winner, 74 All Star Circuit of Champions wins
Lee Osborne	founding member of WoO, 6 career WoO wins. Won the 1981, 1982, 1983 All Star Circuit of Champions Championship, National Sprint Car Hall of Fame member. Founder of OzCar chassis, builds custom hot rods in New York.
Bobby Allen	founding member of WoO and posted 30 career wins, 1990 Knoxville Nationals winner, National Sprint Car Hall of Fame member, WoO Shark Racing team owner
Rick Ferkel	founding member of WoO, 21 series wins, known as the Ohio Traveler, National Sprint Car Hall of Fame member
Jac Haudenschild	Winner of the biggest race in Sprint Car history Mopar Million, 72 WoO series wins, National Sprint Car Hall of Fame member
Ron Shuman	1979 Knoxville Nationals winner, 24 WoO series wins, 4-time CRA Sprint car champion, 3-time SCRA sprint car champion, National Sprint Car Hall of Fame member
Dave Blaney	Former NASCAR Cup Series driver, 1995 WoO Series Champion, 94 WoO wins, National Sprint Car Hall of Fame member
Shane Carson	former WoO driver, promoter, VP of race operations, National Sprint Car Hall of Fame member and board member, 1978 Knoxville Track Champion, 1986 NCRA Dirt Champ series champion
Jeff Gordon	4-time NASCAR Cup Series Champion, 12 USAC Midget wins, 2 USAC Silver Crown wins, 5 USAC Sprint wins, 1990 USAC Midget Champion, 1991 USAC Silver Crown Champion
Kasey Kahne	NASCAR Cup Series driver, 2000 USAC Midget Champion, 11 USAC Midget wins, 3 USAC Silver Crown wins, WoO team owner
Tony Stewart	3-time NASCAR Cup Series Champion, 1995 USAC Triple Crown Champion, WoO Team owner, Eldora Speedway track owner, All Star Circuit of Champions series owner.
Ken Schrader	NASCAR Cup Series driver, 21 USAC Midget wins, 6 USAC Silver Crown wins, 4 USAC Sprint wins, 1982 USAC Silver Crown Champion, 1983 USAC Sprint Champion
Kyle Larson	2021 Kings Royal champion, 2021, 2023 and 2024 Knoxville Nationals champion, 2013 NASCAR Xfinity Series Rookie of the Year, 2014 NASCAR Cup Series Rookie of the Year, 2020, 2021 and 2025 Chili Bowl Nationals midget champion, 2021 and 2025 NASCAR Cup Series champion
Johnny Herrera	1996 Eldora Speedway Kings Royal Winner, 1995 410 sprint car track champion at Knoxville Raceway
Greg Hodnett	5-time Williams Grove track champion, 73 Williams Grove track wins, 20-time WoO race winner, 52 wins at Port Royal Speedway, 4-time Central PA Champion
Don Kreitz Jr	National Sprint Car Hall of Fame member, 12 WoO series wins, 83 Williams Grove Speedway wins and 4-time track champion, Pennsylvania team owner
Keith Kauffman	National Sprint Car Hall of Fame member, 13-time Port Royal Speedway Champion (129 wins), 2-time Williams Grove Speedway Champion (51 wins)
Bobby Davis Jr.	1989 WoO Series Champion, 66 WoO series wins, National Sprint Car Hall of Fame member
Lealand McSpadden	1978, 1993, 1995 Western World Champion, 1991 Chili Bowl (race) Midget Champion, 1992 Belleville Midget Champion, National Sprint Car Hall of Fame member
Christopher Bell	2017, 2018, and 2019 Chili Bowl Nationals champion, NASCAR Cup Series driver
Rico Abreu	Former NASCAR Camping World Truck Series driver. 2015 and 2016 Chili Bowl Nationals midget champion
Brad Doty	18 WoO series wins, National Sprint Car Hall of Fame member, Media member and Doty Classic race promoter
Erin Crocker	First female driver to win a World of Outlaws event, former NASCAR Camping World Truck Series driver, radio journalist.
Bryan Clauson	38 USAC Midget wins, 2 USAC Silver Crown wins, 41 USAC Sprint wins, 2010–2011 USAC Midget Champion, 2012–2013 USAC Sprint Champion, 2014 Chili Bowl Nationals champion, 2012, 2015, 2016 Indianapolis 500 starter, National Sprint Car Hall of Fame member.
Jason Johnson	2016 Knoxville Nationals winner, 12 WoO series wins, 5-time ASCS National Sprint car champion, 79 ASCS National wins, 9 All Star Circuit of Champions wins
Brad Sweet	2019, 2020 and 2021 WoO Series Champion, 74 career WoO wins, 2018 Knoxville Nationals winner, former NASCAR Camping World Truck Series and NASCAR Xfinity Series driver.
