= Knoxville Nationals =

Sprint car event

- Venue: Knoxville Raceway
- Location: Knoxville, Iowa
- Corporate sponsor: NOS Energy Drink | Casey's General Stores
- First race: 1961
- Distance: 25 mi (40 km)
- Laps: 50
- Previous names: Super Modified National Championship (1961–1974); Super Sprint National Championship (1975–1976); National Sprint Car Championships (1977); Knoxville Nationals (1978–1982, 1984, 1986–1990, 1994); Coors Knoxville Nationals (1983); Silver Anniversary Knoxville Nationals (1985); NAPA Knoxville Nationals (1991–1993); Amoco Knoxville Nationals (1995–2000); Amoco Ultimate Knoxville Nationals (2001); Mopar Parts Knoxville Nationals (2002); Ford Dealers of Iowa Knoxville Nationals (2003); Knoxville Nationals presented by Midwest Ford Dealers (2004–2005); Knoxville Nationals presented by Super Clean, Midwest Ford Dealers and Hoosier Racing Tires (2006); Super Clean Knoxville Nationals (2007–2009); Goodyear Knoxville Nationals presented by Lucas Oil (2010); Goodyear Knoxville Nationals (2011–2012); FVP Knoxville Nationals (2013–2015); 5-hour ENERGY Knoxville Nationals presented by Casey's General Stores (2016–2018); NOS Energy Drink Knoxville Nationals presented by Casey's General Stores (2019, 2021–present)
- Most wins (driver): Steve Kinser (12)

Circuit information
- Surface: Dirt | Black Iowa soil (zook clay)
- Length: 0.5 mi (0.80 km)
- Turns: 4

The Knoxville Nationals, known as the NOS Energy Drink Knoxville Nationals presented by Casey's General Store, is an annual sprint car event held at Knoxville Raceway in Knoxville, Iowa. The race is nicknamed "The Granddaddy of Them All." The event is the biggest and most prestigious race of the year in sprint car racing. The Saturday finale is held on the second Saturday in August. The event is held for four days (Wednesday-Saturday) and is attended annually by approximately 25,000 fans. The event has the highest paying purse in sprint car racing at $1,000,000 which attracts roughly 100 race teams to compete.

An Associated Press writer called winning the event "sprint car racing’s premiere title". Kyle Larson is the defending race winner, having won it in 2026.

== History ==
The idea of the Knoxville Nationals was the brainchild of promoter Marion Robinson. The Knoxville Nationals began as a one-day event for Super Modifieds and was later expanded to two, three, and finally four days of racing for Sprint Cars. The first Knoxville Nationals was held in 1961 with Roy Robbins taking the win.

The prize money for the event has grown over the years. The 1961 winner received $1,000 to win and the total purse was $5,455. In 1971 it was $3,000 to win and a total of $22,000. 1982 was $10,000 to win and $100,500. 1991 the winner received $50,000 and the total was $300,120. 1995 it grew to $100,000 to win and $501,000 over all; by 2003 it had risen to $750,000. The purse continued to swell each year and in 2010 it paid $150,000 to win and the total for four days reached $1,000,255.

Some of the events highlights are its surprise upset winners, most notably being Kenny Gritz in 1969, Bobby Allen in 1990, Tim Shaffer in 2010, and Jason Johnson in 2016.

The 1990 Nationals is regarded as one of the best of all time as Doug Wolfgang, off a poor performance in his qualifying day, was sent to the D Main (one of the lowest levels on Finals Saturday) and advanced through the "alphabet soup" of the D-Main, C-Main, B-Main, and finished fifth in the A-Main. Meanwhile, Mark Kinser led the first 22 laps before his engine expired setting up an epic shootout between Sammy Swindell and Bobby Allen, with Allen winning with a pass with two laps remaining. The 1991 event featured 170 entrants and 75,000 fans (in a city of 8,200). There were drivers from 27 states, 6 from Australia, and one from Canada.

For the 2010 Nationals, the feature race was extended to 50 laps, as a celebration for the 50th anniversary of the event. Sammy Swindell led the first 46 laps before his left rear tire blew up. This handed the lead to Donny Schatz who had engine problems, and Tim Shaffer was able to lead the final two circuits to get the win.

In 1969 Kenny Gritz won the Nationals, passing Jan Opperman with four laps remaining. Gritz was fairly new to super modified racing, only competing for four or five seasons. He had won only one feature at Knoxville a couple of months prior and was beginning to peak as a driver. Unfortunately Gritz lost his life two weeks later in a crash at the Nebraska State Fair where IMCA rules at the time did not allow roll cages. His accident sparked the rule change in which roll cages were mandated after that.

Because of the COVID-19 pandemic, the 2020 race was deliberately billed as The One And Only as part of the Capitani Classic. The replacement event was won by Kyle Larson.

In 2025, Ryan Timms won the event at 18-years old, the second youngest Knoxville National winner.

=== Drivers ===
The most successful driver in Nationals history is Steve Kinser who has won the event a record 12 times. He leads virtually every major statistic, 17 top five finishes, 26 top ten finishes, won 14 preliminary night features, led 301 championship A-Main laps, set quick time in qualifying 9 times, qualified for the championship race 35 times in 37 entries, including a streak of 34 from 1978 through 2011. In 2005 Steve's son Kraig Kinser won this event, making Steve and Kraig the first father and son to win the Knoxville Nationals.

Donny Schatz has won the event eleven times (2006-2009, 2011–2015, 2017, 2022). Other multiple event winners are Doug Wolfgang a five-time champion, Kenny Weld,Danny Lasoski, and Kyle Larson are four-time winners, Mark Kinser is a three time champions, and Eddie Leavitt has taken the checkers twice. Larson has four wins on Nationals weekend, as he also won the replacement race in 2020, The One and Only featuring the Capitani Classic.

As an 18-years old, Kenny Weld's 1964 win made him the youngest Knoxville Nationals. In 2025, 18-years old Ryan Timms became the second youngest winner of the event.

=== Statistics ===
The event record car count is 166 cars in 1991. Mark Kinser has set the quickest time in qualifying a record ten times. Cody Darrah holds the Nationals event one lap track record with a lap 14.547 in 2009.

Donny Schatz won the championship race in 2013 from 21st starting position, the lowest starting position for a winner since the race was changed to being run in two (2) separate 25 lap segments. The previous record for the lowest position anyone had won from had been 14th by Steve Kinser in 1995 and Jerry Richert 1962, and both drivers accomplished this feat in a single 30 lap race without a controlled break in the middle of the race.

Car owner Karl Kinser has graced victory lane a record 14 times with three different drivers (Dick Gaines, Steve Kinser and Mark Kinser).

=== Sanctioning body ===
From 1961 through 1977, the race was unsanctioned (with the exception of 1973) meaning that it was 'open competition'. The All Star Circuit of Champions sanctioned the 1973 event with winged cars. In 1978 Ted Johnson's World of Outlaws began to sanction the event, and did so through 2005. Because of the sanctioning body split between the WoO and National Sprint Tour in 2006, the Nationals became sanctioned under the Knoxville Raceway track rules. Since 2012 the WoO name has been associated with the race, but the event is still operated by Knoxville Raceway officials.

=== Female participants ===
15 women have participated in the Nationals. Erin Crocker is the only participant to qualify for the championship race and has accomplished that feat twice in 2003 and 2010. The first female entrant was also the first African-American driver, Cheryl Glass in 1982. Other female entrants include Melinda Dumesny (part of both the Nationals-winning Kinser and Dumesny sprint car families) 1991–1992, Lisa French 1992–1993, Shawna Wilsky 1994–1995, Judi Bates 1996–1997, Sarah Fisher 1997–1998, Christi Passmore 2000–2001, Natalie Sather 2005–2006, Becca Anderson 2006, Jessica Friesen (née Zemken) 2006 & 2011, Paige Polyak 2014–2019, Harli White 2017–2019 & 2021-2022, Jenna Frazier 2018, McKenna Haase 2021-2022, and Tori Knutson 2021.

=== International competition ===
In 1979, multiple Australian Sprintcar Champion Garry Rush became the first Australian driver to qualify for the Nationals championship race and finished 7th. Kerry Madsen is the highest finishing Australian, finishing second in 2015 (although he is now legally registered as a local resident). The event is annually attended by over 1,000 people from Australia, Canada, New Zealand, and England.

Drivers from Australia who have become or were regular competitors at Knoxville include Australian Championship winners Garry Rush, Max Dumesny who won the 1985 Race of States at the Nationals, becoming the first Australian to win a feature at Knoxville. Others have included Skip Jackson, Jaymie Moyle, Kerry Madsen, Ian Madsen, Garry Brazier, Trevor Green, Mitchell Dumesny, Jamie Veal, James McFadden and current one lap track record holder Brooke Tatnell. In 2018, multiple World Champion BriSCA Formula 1 Stock Car driver Tom Harris became the first British driver to compete at the Nationals.

== Past winners ==
=== Knoxville Nationals Winners ===
Year	Driver	Car #	Owner
1961	Roy Robbins	37	O. J. Huffman
1962	Jerry Richert, Sr.	69	Ted Ready
1963	Greg Weld	92	Taylor "Pappy" Weld
1964	Kenny Weld	94	Taylor "Pappy" Weld
1965	Kenny Weld	94	Taylor "Pappy" Weld
1966	Jay Woodside	9	Ted Hall
1967	Thad Dosher	74	Jack Cunningham
1968	Ray Lee Goodwin	24	Swenson/Williams
1969	Ken Gritz	12	Larry Snyder
1970	Joe Saldana	2	C&L Racing
1971	Jan Opperman	6	Cahill Racing
1972	Kenny Weld	29	Bob Weikert
1973	Kenny Weld	29	Bob Weikert
1974	Dick Gaines	71	Karl Kinser
1975	Eddie Leavitt	40	Ricke/Hill
1976	Eddie Leavitt	4J	Galden, Inc.
1977	Doug Wolfgang	20	Bob Trostle
1978	Doug Wolfgang	4x	Speedway Motors
1979	Ron Shuman	75A	Gary Stanton
1980	Steve Kinser	20	Bob Trostle/Karl Kinser
1981	Steve Kinser	11	Karl Kinser
1982	Steve Kinser	11	Karl Kinser
1983	Sammy Swindell	1	Raymond Beadle
1984	Doug Wolfgang	29	Bob Weikert
1985	Doug Wolfgang	29	Bob Weikert
1986	Steve Kinser	11	Karl Kinser
1987	Steve Kinser	11	Karl Kinser
1988	Steve Kinser	11	Karl Kinser
1989	Doug Wolfgang	8D	Danny Peace
1990	Bobby Allen	1a	Allen Enterprises
1991	Steve Kinser	11	Karl Kinser
1992	Steve Kinser	11	Karl Kinser
1993	Steve Kinser	11	Karl Kinser
1994	Steve Kinser	11	Karl Kinser
1995	Steve Kinser	11	Steve Kinser
1996	Mark Kinser	5M	Karl Kinser
1997	Dave Blaney	10	Blaney/Hylton
1998	Danny Lasoski	83	Dennis Roth
1999	Mark Kinser	5M	Karl Kinser
2000	Mark Kinser	5M	Karl Kinser
2001	Danny Lasoski	20L	Tony Stewart
2002	Steve Kinser	11	Steve Kinser
2003	Danny Lasoski	20	Tony Stewart
2004	Danny Lasoski	20	Tony Stewart
2005	Kraig Kinser	11K	Steve Kinser
2006	Donny Schatz	15	Schatz Motorsports
2007	Donny Schatz	15	Schatz Motorsports
2008	Donny Schatz	15	Tony Stewart
2009	Donny Schatz	15	Tony Stewart
2010	Tim Shaffer	83	Call/Holbrook Motorsports
2011	Donny Schatz	15	Tony Stewart
2012	Donny Schatz	15	Tony Stewart
2013	Donny Schatz	15	Tony Stewart
2014	Donny Schatz	15	Tony Stewart
2015	Donny Schatz	15	Tony Stewart
2016	Jason Johnson	41	Jason Johnson Racing
2017	Donny Schatz	15	Tony Stewart
2018	Brad Sweet	49	Kasey Kahne Racing
2019	David Gravel	41	Jason Johnson Racing
2020	Not held due to the COVID-19 pandemic; Replaced by The One and Only		
2021	Kyle Larson	57	Silva Motorsports
2022	Donny Schatz	15	Tony Stewart
2023	Kyle Larson	57	Silva Motorsports
2024	Kyle Larson	57	Silva Motorsports
2025	Ryan Timms	10	Liebig Motorsports
2026	Kyle Larson	57	Silva Motorsports

==== Multiple victories by driver ====
# of wins	Driver	Years won
12	Steve Kinser	1980, 1981, 1982, 1986, 1987, 1988, 1991, 1992, 1993, 1994, 1995, 2002
11	Donny Schatz	2006, 2007, 2008, 2009, 2011, 2012, 2013, 2014, 2015, 2017, 2022
5	Doug Wolfgang	1977, 1978, 1984, 1985, 1989
4	Danny Lasoski	1998, 2001, 2003, 2004
4	Kenny Weld	1964, 1965, 1972, 1973
4	Kyle Larson	2021, 2023, 2024, 2026
3	Mark Kinser	1996, 1999, 2000
2	Eddie Leavitt	1975, 1976

==== Additional Info ====
- Steve Kinser and Donny Schatz both hold the record for most consecutive wins at 5.
- Steve Kinser and Kraig Kinser are the only father-son duo to have won the Knoxville Nationals.
- Greg Weld and Kenny Weld are the only brothers that have both won the Knoxville Nationals.
- Steve Kinser (1986–1987 and 1991–1992) and Kyle Larson (2023–2024) are the only two drivers to lead all laps in the A-Main in back to back years.

=== 360 Knoxville Nationals ===
In 1991, the Knoxville Raceway started a Nationals event for 360 cubic inch engine sprint cars. It has been held annually each year since and is held the week before the Knoxville Nationals. Shane Stewart and Terry McCarl hold the record for most wins with five victories each. Rico Abreu is the defending winner.

=== 360 Knoxville Nationals Champions ===
Year	Driver	Car #	Owner
1991	David Hesmer	1	Action Auto Racing
1992	Garry Lee Maier	11x	Jimmie Rogers
1993	Garry Lee Maier	11x	Jimmie Rogers
1994	Lee Nelson	26	Bob Brody
1995	Danny Lasoski	45	Ray Lipsey
1996	Terry McCarl	51	Brad Gray
1997	David Hesmer	11	Ergenbright Motorsports
1998	Gary Wright	9	Gary Wright
1999	Dennis Moore Jr.	71	Dennis Moore Jr.
2000	Wayne Johnson	29J	Fred and Joe Threatt
2001	Terry McCarl	24x	Terry McCarl
2002	Jeff Swindell	6s	Don Goodson
2003	Dennis Moore Jr.	75x	Doug Brown
2004	Billy Alley	22	Stewart and Susette Alley
2005	Billy Alley	22	Stewart and Susette Alley
2006	Jesse Giannetto	D1	Bulldogg Motorsports
2007	Shane Stewart	1HD	Mike Doyle
2008	Wayne Johnson	94	Mike and Tim Hammers/Robbie Forbes
2009	Terry McCarl	24	Tod Quiring
2010	Shane Stewart	57	Paul Silva
2011	Shane Stewart	57	Paul Silva
2012	Shane Stewart	57	Paul Silva
2013	Shane Stewart	57	Paul Silva
2014	Brian Brown	21	Brian Brown
2015	Terry McCarl	24	Terry McCarl
2016	Sammy Swindell	3s	A.G. Rains
2017	Clint Garner	40	Boyd and Glenda Fluth
2018	Terry McCarl	24	Terry McCarl
2019	James McFadden	9M	Kasey Kahne
2020	Kerry Madsen	2M	Tod Quiring
2021	Giovanni Scelzi	18	Bret Nehring and Matthew Barbara
2022	Aaron Reutzel	8	Ridge & Sons Racing
2023	Brian Brown	21	Brian Brown
2024	Tyler Courtney	7BC	Clauson Marshall Racing
2025	Rico Abreu	24R	Rico Abreu Racing
2026	Ryan Timms	10	Liebig Motorsports

==== Multiple victories by driver ====
# of wins	Driver	Years won
5	Shane Stewart	2007, 2010, 2011, 2012, 2013
5	Terry McCarl	1996, 2001, 2009, 2015, 2018
2	Billy Alley	2004, 2005
2	Wayne Johnson	2000, 2008
2	Dennis Moore Jr.	1999, 2003
2	Garry Lee Maier	1992, 1993
2	David Hesmer	1991, 1997
2	Brian Brown	2014, 2023

=== Late Model Knoxville Nationals ===
In 2004, the Late Model Knoxville Nationals was created and is held annually at the end of September. Scott Bloomquist, Brian Birkhofer, Mike Marlar, and Jimmy Owens are the only repeat champions of the event. In 2021, Mike Marlar became the first three-time winner of the Late Model Knoxville Nationals.

=== Late Model Knoxville Nationals champions ===
Year	Driver	Car #
2004	Brian Birkhofer	15B
2005	Scott Bloomquist	0
2006	Brian Shirley	3s
2007	Brady Smith	2
2008	Tim McCreadie	39
2009	Scott Bloomquist	0
2010	Billy Moyer	21
2011	Don O'Neal	71
2012	Steve Francis	15
2013	Darrell Lanigan	29x
2014	Brian Birkhofer	15B
2015	Jared Landers	777
2016	Mike Marlar	157
2017	Mike Marlar	157
2018	Jimmy Owens	20
2019	Jimmy Owens	20
2020	Not held (Track closed after Capitani Classic incidents)	
2021	Mike Marlar	157
2022	Jonathan Davenport	49
2023	Ricky Thornton Jr.	20RT
2024	Bobby Pierce	32P
2025	Hudson O'Neal	71
2026	Not held (Inclement weather expectation for week)	

==== Multiple victories by driver ====
# of wins	Driver	Years won
3	Mike Marlar	2016, 2017, 2021
2	Jimmy Owens	2018, 2019
2	Scott Bloomquist	2005, 2009
2	Brian Birkhofer	2004, 2014
