= Brad Sweet =

American racing driver (born 1985)

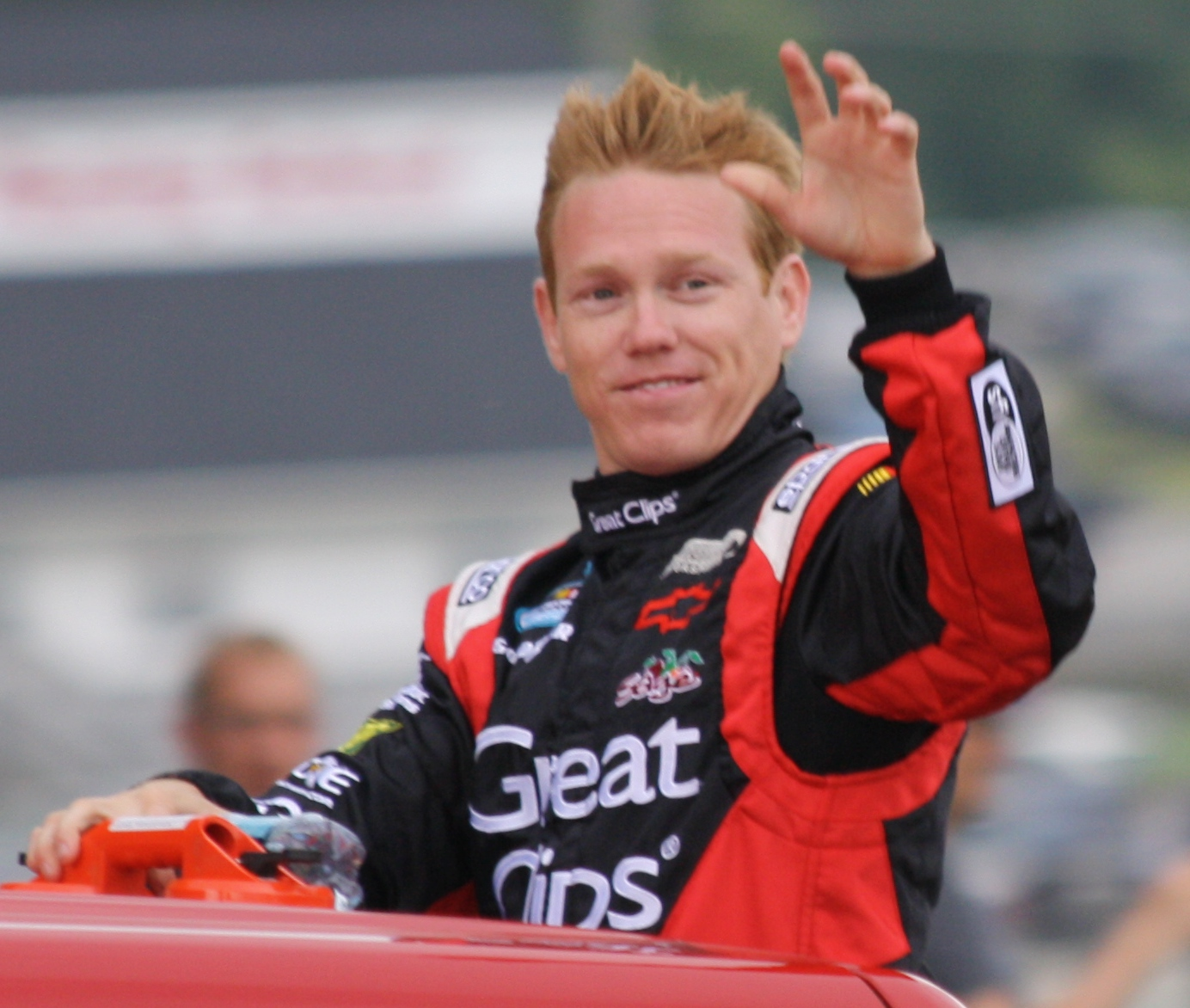
- Sweet at Road America in 2012
- Born: December 31, 1985 (age 40); Grass Valley, California, U.S.
- Achievements: 2019, 2020, 2021, 2022, 2023 World of Outlaws NOS Energy Drink Sprint Car Series champion 2024 High Limit Racing champion 2018 Knoxville Nationals winner 2013, 2019 Kings Royal winner 2009 4-Crown Nationals Midget winner 2008 4-Crown Nationals Wingless Sprint Car winner

NASCAR O'Reilly Auto Parts Series career
- 36 races run over 3 years
- 2013 position: 22nd
- Best finish: 18th (2012)
- First race: 2010 5-Hour Energy 250 (Gateway)
- Last race: 2013 Ford EcoBoost 300 (Homestead)
Wins	Top tens	Poles
0	6	0

NASCAR FedEx Freight Truck Series career
- 18 races run over 3 years
- 2011 position: 28th
- Best finish: 28th (2011)
- First race: 2009 Lucas Oil 150 (Phoenix)
- Last race: 2011 O'Reilly Auto Parts 250 (Kansas)
Wins	Top tens	Poles
0	3	0

World of Outlaws NOS Energy Drink Sprint Car Series career
- Debut season: 2003
- Current team: Kasey Kahne Racing
- Car number: 49
- Starts: 815
- Championships: 5
- Wins: 90
- Poles: 69
- Best finish: 1st in 2019, 2020, 2021, 2022, 2023
- Finished last season: 33rd (2024)
- Statistics up to date as of Nov 4, 2023.

Bradley Kirk Sweet (born December 31, 1985) is an American sprint car driver and co-founder of SLC promotions with Kyle Larson and Colby Copeland. After a spell as a JR Motorsports development driver in the NASCAR Nationwide Series, he won five World of Outlaws Sprint Car Series titles from 2019 to 2023 and earned a total 92 race wins. In 2022, he co-founded High Limit Racing, where he claimed the 2024 championship and 14 race wins. Nicknamed 'The Big Cat', Sweet competed for Kasey Kahne Racing from 2014 until his retirement as a full-time driver in 2025.

== Racing career ==
=== Early career ===
Sweet began his top-level racing career in 2008, driving for Kasey Kahne Racing in midget cars and sprint cars in the USAC National Midget Series and World of Outlaws series. Sweet proved competitive, winning some of the series' top races, including the Knoxville Midget Nationals, and won at Eldora Speedway, one of the most famous short tracks in America, in both sprint and midget cars. Sweet also began driving stock cars, making starts in the ARCA Racing Series and NASCAR Camping World Truck Series starting in 2009. In 2010 and 2011, he drove partial seasons in the Camping World Truck Series for Stringer Motorsports and Turner Motorsports, finishing 28th in points in 2011.

=== NASCAR Nationwide Series ===
In 2012 Sweet drove the No. 38 Nationwide Series car, a Chevrolet sponsored by Great Clips and owned by Turner Motorsports, in a limited schedule. He competed in 18 of the series' races, with Kasey Kahne driving the car during the remainder of the year. Sweet competed for the Nationwide Series Rookie of the Year award. In addition to driving in the Nationwide Series, he would also continue to drive for Kasey Kahne Racing in the World of Outlaws series, driving the No. 49. He finished 18th in series points, before moving to JR Motorsports to drive the No. 5 Chevrolet Camaro part-time in 2013.

=== World of Outlaws ===
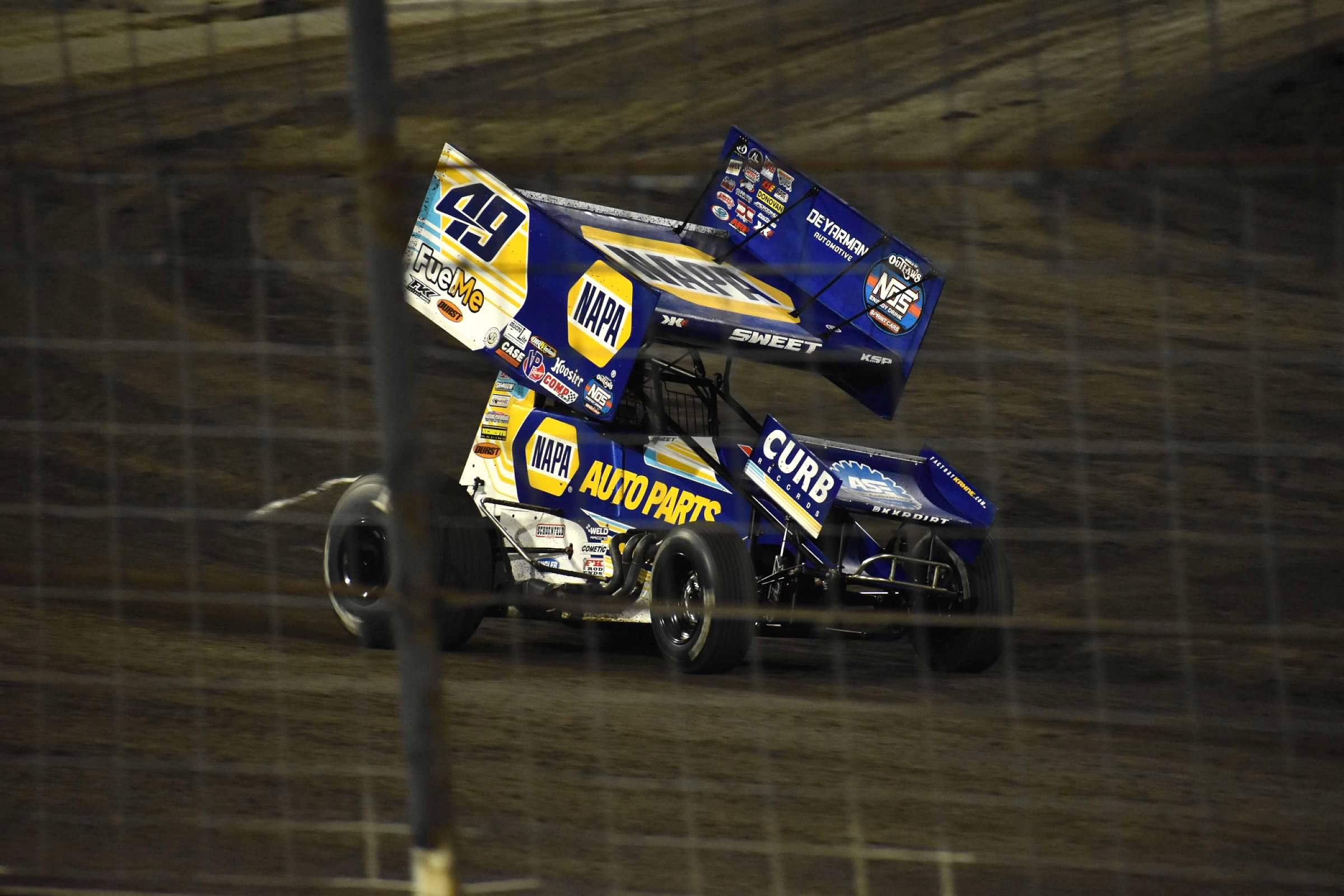
Brad Sweet at the 2022 Knoxville Nationals

Sweet became a full-time driver of the NAPA Auto Parts/Ollie's Bargain Outlet number 49 for Kasey Kahne Racing for the 2014 season. He collected his first World of Outlaws win in 2012 at the Clay County Speedway. In 2013, he won the Kings Royal at Eldora Speedway, one of the biggest races of the year for his only win that season. He ended 2013 ranked 18th in points. Sweet started the 2014 season by winning the season opener at Volusia Speedway for his third career World of Outlaws win. Sweet has said that the World of Outlaws is more of a home than NASCAR, his previous series. Sweet won the 2018 Knoxville Nationals, the first Nationals victory for Kasey Kahne Racing; he finished second in the 2018 Kings Royal to Donny Schatz, but returned in 2019 to win the event for the second time.

Sweet has won five World of Outlaws Sprint Car Series championships in a row, 2019, 2020, 2021, 2022, and 2023. He took the title in 2019 over Donny Schatz with 16 wins, and repeated a title run in 2020, winning eight times and becoming the sixth driver to win multiple WoO championships. He won a total 92 feature races out of 895 starts.

Brad Sweet qualifying his midget
Sweet setting the fast time in qualifying for the USAC National Midget Series race at Dodge County, Wisconsin, USA in 2008 — 681 kb

=== High Limit Racing ===
Sweet and Kyle Larson co-founded the High Limit Racing sprint car series in 2022. He left the World Outlaws for his new series in 2024, winning the championship with ten wins. In 2025, he was the runner-up with four wins, after which he retired from full-time racing.

== Motorsports career results ==
=== NASCAR ===
(key) (Bold – Pole position awarded by qualifying time. Italics – Pole position earned by points standings or practice time. * – Most laps led.)

==== Nationwide Series ====
NASCAR Nationwide Series results
Year	Team	No.	Make	1	2	3	4	5	6	7	8	9	10	11	12	13	14	15	16	17	18	19	20	21	22	23	24	25	26	27	28	29	30	31	32	33	34	35	NNSC	Pts	Ref
2010	Braun Racing	11	Toyota	DAY	CAL	LVS	BRI	NSH	PHO	TEX	TAL	RCH	DAR	DOV	CLT	NSH	KEN	ROA	NHA	DAY	CHI	GTY	IRP	IOW	GLN	MCH	BRI	CGV	ATL	RCH	DOV	KAN	CAL	CLT	GTY; 31	TEX	PHO	HOM	129th	70	
2012	Turner Motorsports	38	Chevy	DAY	PHO	LVS	BRI	CAL; 6	TEX	RCH	TAL; 33	DAR	IOW; 13	CLT	DOV; 23	MCH; 24	ROA; 20	KEN; 16	DAY; 24	NHA	CHI; 19	IND	IOW; 12	GLN	CGV; 20	BRI	ATL	RCH; 20	CHI	KEN; 10	DOV	CLT; 15	KAN; 23	TEX; 13	PHO	HOM; 17			18th	469	
2013	JR Motorsports	5	Chevy	DAY	PHO	LVS; 12	BRI; 22	CAL; 22	TEX	RCH	TAL	DAR	CLT	DOV	IOW; 34	MCH; 6	ROA	KEN; 14	DAY; 28	NHA	CHI; 9	IND	IOW; 15	GLN	MOH	BRI	ATL	RCH	CHI; 20	KEN; 30	DOV; 13	KAN; 8	CLT; 26	TEX; 10	PHO; 28	HOM; 31			22nd	420	

==== Camping World Truck Series ====
NASCAR Camping World Truck Series results
Year	Team	No.	Make	1	2	3	4	5	6	7	8	9	10	11	12	13	14	15	16	17	18	19	20	21	22	23	24	25	NCWTC	Pts	Ref
2009	Stringer Motorsports	90	Toyota	DAY	CAL	ATL	MAR	KAN	CLT	DOV	TEX	MCH	MLW	MEM	KEN	IRP	NSH	BRI	CHI	IOW	GTW	NHA	LVS	MAR	TAL	TEX	PHO; 22	HOM; 27	69th	179	
2010	Stringer Motorsports	90	Toyota	DAY	ATL; 12	MAR	NSH	KAN	DOV	CLT; 21	TEX	MCH; 19	IOW	GTY; 16	IRP; 8	POC	NSH	DAR	BRI; DNQ	CHI; 16	KEN	NHA	LVS	MAR	TAL	TEX	PHO; 15	HOM; 25	31st	911	
2011	Turner Motorsports	32	Chevy	DAY; 21	PHO; 11	DAR; 36	MAR; 15	NSH; 28	DOV; 30	CLT; 10	KAN; 9	TEX	KEN	IOW	NSH	IRP	POC	MCH	BRI	ATL	CHI	NHA	KEN	LVS	TAL	MAR	TEX	HOM	28th	193	

^{*} Season still in progress
^{1} Ineligible for series points

=== ARCA Re/Max Series ===
(key) (Bold – Pole position awarded by qualifying time. Italics – Pole position earned by points standings or practice time. * – Most laps led.)

ARCA Re/Max Series results
Year	Team	No.	Make	1	2	3	4	5	6	7	8	9	10	11	12	13	14	15	16	17	18	19	20	21	ARSC	Pts	Ref
2009	Stringer Motorsports	90	Toyota	DAY	SLM	CAR	TAL	KEN	TOL	POC	MCH	MFD	IOW	KEN; 16	BLN	POC	ISF	CHI; 34	TOL	DSF	NJE	SLM	KAN	CAR	107th	210	

== Personal life ==
Sweet's sister Katelyn is married to NASCAR driver Kyle Larson.
