= National Sprint Car Hall of Fame & Museum =

Auto racing museum in Knoxville, Iowa

Coordinates: 41.328°N 93.110°W

- Established: 1992
- Location: One Sprint Capital Place; Knoxville, Iowa, USA
- Type: Automotive
- Website: www.sprintcarhof.com

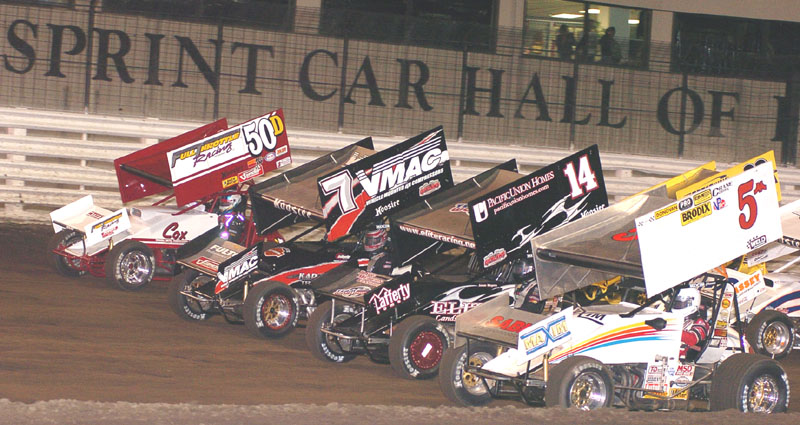
The National Sprint Car Hall of Fame & Museum is visible in the background at the Knoxville Raceway

The National Sprint Car Hall of Fame & Museum is a hall of fame and museum for sprint car drivers, owners, mechanics, builders, manufacturers, promoters, sanctioning officials and media members. The museum is located in Knoxville, Iowa, the home of the Knoxville Nationals at Knoxville Raceway.

The National Sprint Car Hall of Fame & Museum Foundation, Inc., is a 501(c)(3) non-profit organization incorporated in the state of Iowa on April 25, 1986, for the sole purpose of preserving the history of the sport of sprint car racing and honoring its greatest achievers. The $1.7-million facility, located on the Marion County Fairgrounds in Knoxville, officially opened on January 4, 1992.

The first floor of the four-story structure features the Donald Lamberti National Sprint Car Museum, a museum store and the administrative offices. The museum currently has twenty-five (25) restored ‘big cars’, supermodifieds and sprint cars on loan. The 8,000-square-foot (740 m^{2}) exhibit space also contains displays of trophies, paintings, photos, plaques, helmets and other memorabilia of the sport of sprint car racing.

== Foundation and facility ==
The National Sprint Car Hall of Fame honors outstanding achievers in the sport of ‘big car’ and sprint car racing, including those in the driver, owner/mechanic and promoter/sanctioning official/media member categories. The entire nomination and election process is carried out by the 72-member National Induction Committee, which consists of media members, historians and representatives of the major oldtimers organizations from across the United States.

The facility also include a library and research center, a 40-seat theater, a catering kitchen, an administrative office, a conference and banquet facility, and a 150-seat clubhouse for race-viewing on individual nights.

The Bryan Clauson Suite Tower opened in 2018 and is a five story suite complex that sits adjacent to the current museum suites to the west. This five-story suite tower houses 4 suites on each of the top three stories, for a total of 12 new suites, with an observation deck on the Bryan Clauson Suite Tower roof, reserved for the suite-holders of this building.

== Eligibility ==
Candidates for the National Sprint Car Hall of Fame must be nominated by September 1 of the year prior to induction. The 72-member panel, split into regions (East, West, Mideast, Midwest), consists of media members, historians, researchers, and organisations of retired personalities invited by the Hall of Fame itself.

Those eligible to be nominated may be a driver, owner, builder, sponsor, mechanic, manufacturer, promoter, official or media member for a minimum of five (5) racing seasons. Exceptions to the length of activity within the sport of sprint car racing may be made for those who moved on to other divisions of motorsports (i.e. -Indy Cars, Stock Cars). Nominee must either be retired five years, be 50 as of January 1 of the year of nomination, or have been deceased six months prior to the nomination of candidates.

The ballot is split into four types of inductees:

1. Driver-Oriented: Drivers
2. Vehicle-Oriented: Owners, Mechanics, Builders, Car Sponsors, Manufacturers
3. Event-Oriented: Promoters, Officials, Media, Event and Series Sponsors.
4. Pre-1945: All three above categories classified if their careers primarily took place before World War II.

The first ballot is then reduced to a second ballot that features nine drivers, five personalities in the Vehicle-Oriented class, Event-Oriented class, and Pre-1945 class.

The second ballot, votes will be tabulated, and the top three drivers, top two vehicle-oriented class and event-oriented class nominees, and the top pre-1945 category nominee in votes, provided they have accumulated a minimum of 25% of all ballots (18 votes), are inducted.

== See also ==
- Sprint car racing
- World of Outlaws
