= Mike Marlar =

American racing driver (born 1978)

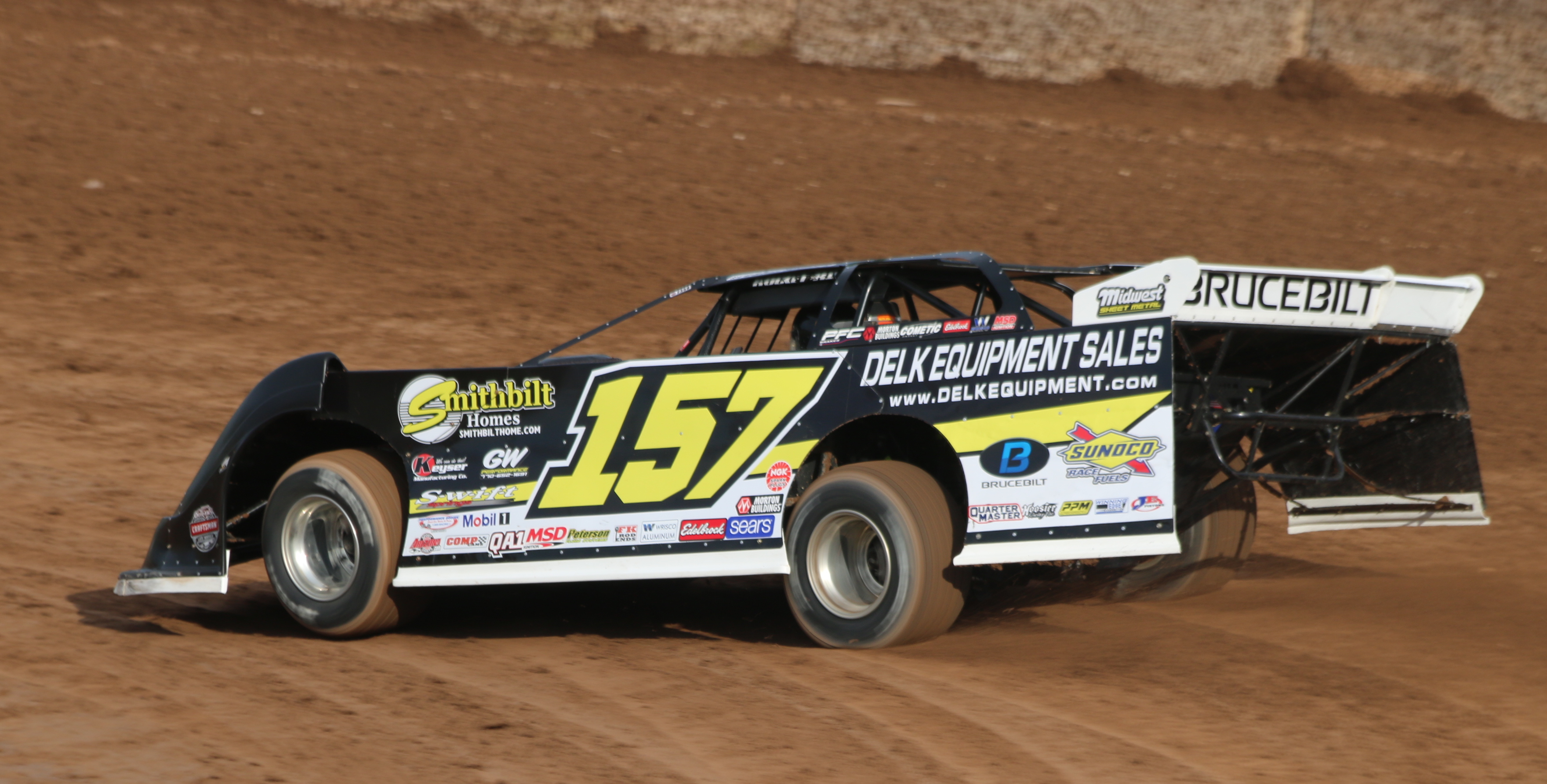
- Marlar's 2018 World of Outlaws Late Model Series championship car at Plymouth
- Born: Michael D. Marlar; January 30, 1978 (age 48); Winfield, Tennessee, U.S.
- Achievements: 2018 World of Outlaws Late Model Series Champion; 2018, 2022 Wild West Shootout Champion; 2003 Battle of the Bluegrass Super Late Model Series Champion; 2004, 2012 Hillbilly 100 Winner; 2004, 2010, 2019 Magnolia State Cotton Pickin' 100 Winner; 2013, 2017, 2019 Clash at the Mag Winner; 2016, 2017, 2021 Knoxville Dirt Late Model Nationals Winner; 2018 Gopher 50 Winner; 2020 Tennessee Tipoff Winner; 2022 FloRacing Late Model Challenge Winner

NASCAR Cup Series career
- 1 race run over 1 year
- 2021 position: 36th
- Best finish: 36th (2021)
- First race: 2021 Food City Dirt Race (Bristol Dirt)
Wins	Top tens	Poles
0	0	0

NASCAR O'Reilly Auto Parts Series career
- 1 race run over 1 year
- 2019 position: 108th
- Best finish: 108th (2019)
- First race: 2019 Go Bowling 250 (Richmond)
Wins	Top tens	Poles
0	0	0

NASCAR FedEx Freight Truck Series career
- 3 races run over 3 years
- 2022 position: 56th
- Best finish: 56th (2022)
- First race: 2019 Eldora Dirt Derby (Eldora)
- Last race: 2022 Pinty's Truck Race on Dirt (Bristol Dirt)
Wins	Top tens	Poles
0	1	0
- Statistics up to date as of November 5, 2022.

Michael D. Marlar (born January 30, 1978) is an American professional dirt track and stock car racing driver and team owner. He currently competes full-time in Dirt Late Model competition in the No. 157 Longhorn Chassis for Skyline Motorsports. Marlar is the 2018 World of Outlaws Late Model Series champion and has also previously competed in the NASCAR Cup Series, NASCAR Xfinity Series, and NASCAR Camping World Truck Series from 2018 to 2022.

== Racing career ==
=== Dirt racing ===
Marlar won the 2020 Butterball Memorial at Richmond Raceway in Kentucky and the associated $20,000 payday.

=== Stock car racing ===
Marlar made his NASCAR Gander Outdoors Truck Series debut at the 2019 Eldora Dirt Derby driving the No. 33 Toyota Tundra for Reaume Brothers Racing. Upon arriving at the track, Marlar was forced to remove the logos for his sponsor Marathon Oil off his truck, as it conflicted with Sunoco being the official fuel of NASCAR. He qualified for the main event by finishing fifth in the third qualifying race. He started in the 23rd position and finished fourth in the main event.

In September 2019, Marlar joined MBM Motorsports for his NASCAR Xfinity Series debut at Richmond Raceway. He spun on the first lap and suffered terminal damage that resulted in a last-place finish.

In March 2021, Marlar returned to MBM to make his NASCAR Cup Series debut in the dirt race at Bristol Motor Speedway. He also joined Hill Motorsports to run the supporting Truck event. In the Truck race, he was involved in a late crash with Kyle Larson. Marlar's maiden Cup start ended after completing 244 of 253 laps due to a spin and he finished 31st.

== Motorsports career results ==
=== NASCAR ===
(key) (Bold – Pole position awarded by qualifying time. Italics – Pole position earned by points standings or practice time. * – Most laps led.)

==== Cup Series ====
NASCAR Cup Series results
Year	Team	No.	Make	1	2	3	4	5	6	7	8	9	10	11	12	13	14	15	16	17	18	19	20	21	22	23	24	25	26	27	28	29	30	31	32	33	34	35	36	NCSC	Pts	Ref
2021	MBM Motorsports	66	Toyota	DAY	DAY	HOM	LVS	PHO	ATL	BRI; 31	MAR	RCH	TAL	KAN	DAR	DOV	COA	CLT	SON	NSH	POC	POC	ROA	ATL	NHA	GLN	IND	MCH	DAY	DAR	RCH	BRI	LVS	TAL	CLT	TEX	KAN	MAR	PHO	36th	6	

==== Xfinity Series ====
NASCAR Xfinity Series results
Year	Team	No.	Make	1	2	3	4	5	6	7	8	9	10	11	12	13	14	15	16	17	18	19	20	21	22	23	24	25	26	27	28	29	30	31	32	33	NXSC	Pts	Ref
2019	MBM Motorsports	66	Toyota	DAY	ATL	LVS	PHO	CAL	TEX	BRI	RCH	TAL	DOV	CLT	POC	MCH	IOW	CHI	DAY	KEN	NHA	IOW	GLN	MOH	BRI	ROA	DAR	IND	LVS	RCH; 38	CLT	DOV	KAN	TEX	PHO	HOM	108th	0^{1}	

==== Camping World Truck Series ====
NASCAR Camping World Truck Series results
Year	Team	No.	Make	1	2	3	4	5	6	7	8	9	10	11	12	13	14	15	16	17	18	19	20	21	22	23	NCWTC	Pts	Ref
2019	Reaume Brothers Racing	33	Toyota	DAY	ATL	LVS	MAR	TEX	DOV	KAN	CLT	TEX	IOW	GTW	CHI	KEN	POC	ELD; 4	MCH	BRI	MSP	LVS	TAL	MAR	PHO	HOM	57th	36	
2021	Hill Motorsports	56	Toyota	DAY	DAY	LVS	ATL	BRI; 28	RCH	KAN	DAR	COA	CLT	TEX	NSH	POC	KNX	GLN	GTW	DAR	BRI	LVS	TAL	MAR	PHO		112th	0^{1}	
2022	Reaume Brothers Racing	33	Toyota	DAY	LVS	ATL	COA	MAR	BRI; 17	DAR	KAN	TEX	CLT	GTW	SON	KNO	NSH	MOH	POC	IRP	RCH	KAN	BRI	TAL	HOM	PHO	56th	20	
