= Golobic =

Golobic or Golobič is a surname. Notable people with the surname include:

- Franz Golobic (1922–2010), Austrian footballer
- Gregor Golobič (born 1964), Slovenian politician
- Shane Golobic (born 1991), American racing driver
