= Shane Golobic =

American racing driver (born 1991)

- Born: Shane Mathew Golobic; August 15, 1991 (age 35) Fremont, California, U.S.

World of Outlaws Sprint Car Series career
- Debut season: 2007
- Current team: Matt Wood Racing
- Car number: 17W
- Wins: 2

USAC National Midget Series career
- Debut season: 2007
- Current team: Matt Wood Racing
- Car number: 17W
- Wins: 1
- Best finish: 2nd in 2017

NASCAR Cup Series career
- 1 race run over 1 year
- 2021 position: 40th
- Best finish: 40th (2021)
- First race: 2021 Food City Dirt Race (Bristol Dirt)
Wins	Top tens	Poles
0	0	0

NASCAR K&N Pro Series West
- Years active: 2013
- Teams: Roadrunner Motorsports, Bill McAnally Racing
- Starts: 3
- Best finish: 26th in 2013

Previous series
- 2008, 2011–2018, 2020 2006–2019: King of the West Sprint Car Series; California Sprint Car Civil War Series

Championship titles
- 2014 2012, 2014 2009: California Sprint Car Civil War Series; Ocean Speedway 360 Winged Sprints; Calistoga Speedway Sprints
- Statistics up to date as of December 25, 2021.

Shane Mathew Golobic (born August 15, 1991) is an American professional dirt track racing driver. He competes in the World of Outlaws Sprint Car Series and United States Auto Club (USAC) National Midget Series for Matt Wood Racing. Prior to racing nationally, much of his dirt racing participation came in his home state of California, which included winning track championships and the California Sprint Car Civil War Series in 2014.

He also has experience in stock car racing, competing in the NASCAR K&N Pro Series West and NASCAR Cup Series.

== Racing career ==
=== Dirt track racing ===
At the age of five, Golobic began Quarter Midget racing at tracks in his native California and driving a car built by his grandfather. When he turned 15, he moved into sprint car racing. While he continued racing in California, he expanded to include events in Indiana as a 16-year-old and won his first race in the state at Lawrenceburg Speedway.

In 2009, Golobic won the Calistoga Speedway 360 Winged Sprints championship by finishing in the top ten in every race. Additional track titles came at Ocean Speedway in 2012 and 2014, while the latter year also saw him win the California Civil War Series championship. In 2016 and 2017, Golobic won the Trophy Cup, a three-day charity race at Thunderbowl Raceway that has the largest sports-related prize money reward in the San Joaquin Valley. At Huset's Speedway in 2020, Golobic won the Midwest Sprint Touring Series 360 Winged Sprint feature over 45 competitors.

Golobic won his first World of Outlaws Sprint Car Series race at Antioch Speedway in 2013. A second victory came at Placerville Speedway in 2019.

In 2017, Golobic ran his first full season in the USAC National Midget Series for Clauson-Marshall Racing and Matt Wood Racing. He won the Indiana Midget Week championship and finished second in the USAC national standings. The following year, he entered the King of the West series with Tarlton Motorsports.

Golobic began competing in the Chili Bowl Nationals in 2008, where he reached the B-Main. He qualified for his first feature A-Main in the 2010 Nationals; additional A-Main runs came in 2011, 2013, and 2016 to 2020. His best A-Main finish during the 2010s was seventh in 2013.

=== Stock car racing ===
During the 2013 racing season, Golobic entered the NASCAR K&N Pro Series West and declared for NASCAR Rookie of the Year honors, though he failed to qualify in his first attempt at Stockton 99 Speedway for Valerie Inglebright. In October, he joined Bill McAnally Racing for a three-race schedule beginning at All American Speedway.

In 2021, Golobic joined Live Fast Motorsports for his NASCAR Cup Series debut in Bristol Motor Speedway's Food City Dirt Race. The effort was supported by Matt Wood Racing. After starting 35th, he finished 37th as the result of a lap 41 crash that saw him hit the spinning car of Aric Almirola.

== Personal life ==
Golobic is a third-generation driver as his father and grandfather competed on dirt tracks throughout California like San Jose Speedway before becoming chassis builders. Father John Golobic finished second in the 1996 California Sprint Car Civil War Series standings. Shane's younger brother, Dustin, often serves as his crew chief on his sprint car. He has a bachelor's degree in mechanical engineering from San Jose State University.

A native of Fremont, California, Golobic is nicknamed the "Fremont Flyer". He also has the nickname "Sugar".

== Motorsports career results ==
=== NASCAR ===
(key) (Bold – Pole position awarded by qualifying time. Italics – Pole position earned by points standings or practice time. * – Most laps led.)

==== Cup Series ====
NASCAR Cup Series results
Year	Team	No.	Make	1	2	3	4	5	6	7	8	9	10	11	12	13	14	15	16	17	18	19	20	21	22	23	24	25	26	27	28	29	30	31	32	33	34	35	36	NCSC	Pts	Ref
2021	Live Fast Motorsports	78	Ford	DAY	DAY	HOM	LVS	PHO	ATL	BRI; 37	MAR	RCH	TAL	KAN	DAR	DOV	COA	CLT	SON	NSH	POC	POC	ROA	ATL	NHA	GLN	IND	MCH	DAY	DAR	RCH	BRI	LVS	TAL	CLT	TEX	KAN	MAR	PHO	40th	1	

==== K&N Pro Series West ====
NASCAR K&N Pro Series West results
Year	Team	No.	Make	1	2	3	4	5	6	7	8	9	10	11	12	13	14	15	NKNPSWC	Pts	Ref
2013	Roadrunner Motorsports	1	Chevy	PHO	S99; DNQ	BIR	IOW	L44	SON	CNS	IOW	EVG	SPO	MMP	SMP				26th	112	
2013	Bill McAnally Racing	20	Toyota													AAS; 8	KCR; 8		26th	112	
2013	Bill McAnally Racing	16	Toyota															PHO; 21	26th	112	

^{*} Season still in progress
^{1} Ineligible for series points
