= 2019 Go Bowling 250 =

Race details
- Race 27 of 33 in the 2019 NASCAR Xfinity Series season
- Date: September 20, 2019
- Location: Richmond Raceway in Richmond, Virginia
- Course: Permanent racing facility
- Course length: 0.75 miles (1.2 km)
- Distance: 250 laps, 187.5 mi (301.8 km)

Pole position
Driver	Austin Cindric	Team Penske
- Time: 22.708

Most laps led
Driver	Christopher Bell	Joe Gibbs Racing
- Laps: 238

Winner
No. 20	Christopher Bell	Joe Gibbs Racing

Television in the United States
- Network: NBCSN

Radio in the United States
- Radio: MRN

The 2019 Go Bowling 250 is a NASCAR Xfinity Series race held on September 20, 2019, at Richmond Raceway in Richmond, Virginia. Contested over 250 laps on the 0.75 mile (1.2 km) asphalt short track, it was the 27th race of the 2019 NASCAR Xfinity Series season, first race of the Playoffs, and the first race of the Round of 12.

== Background ==
=== Track ===
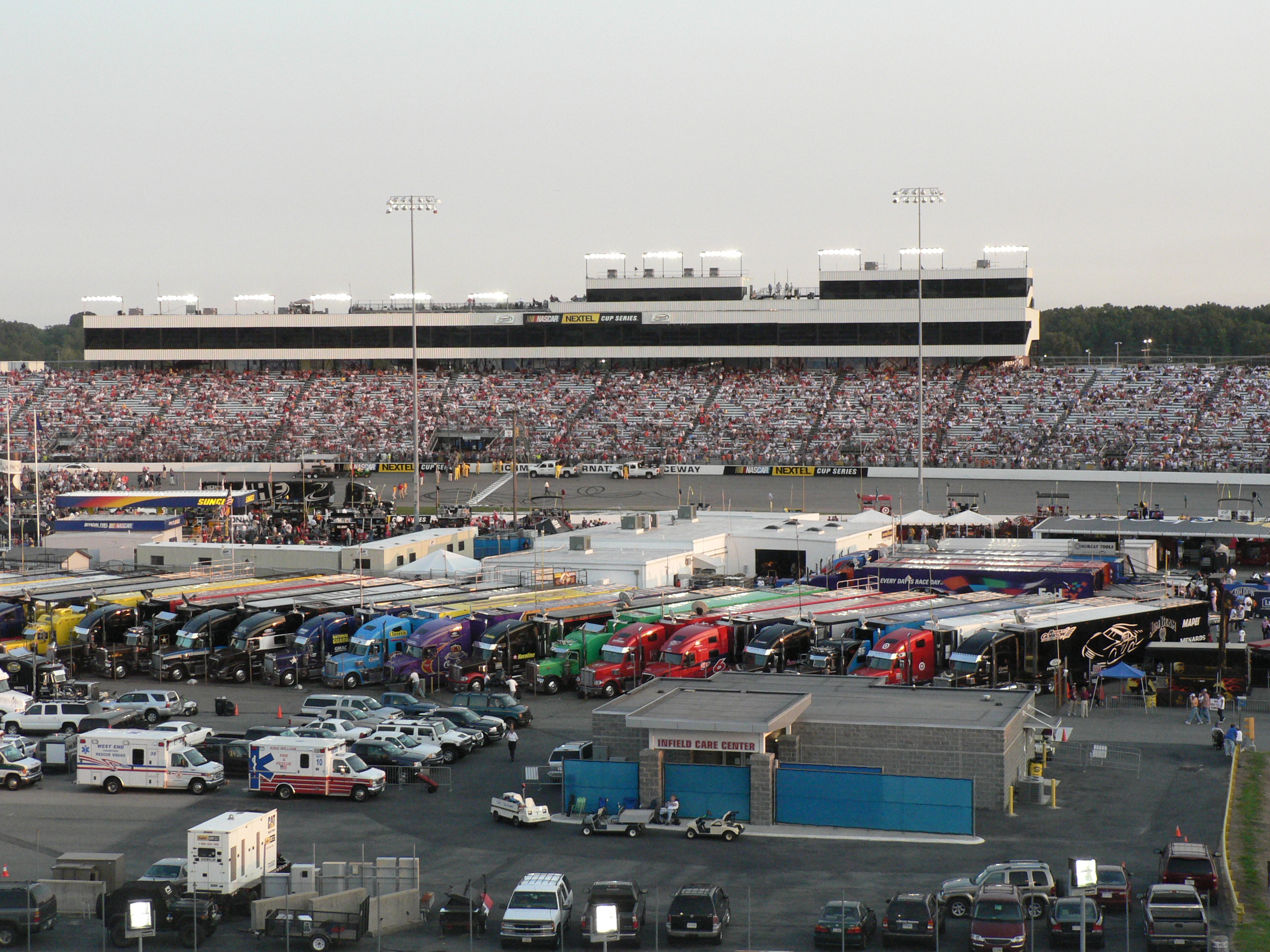
Richmond Raceway, the track where the race was held.

Richmond Raceway is a 3/4-mile (1.2 km), D-shaped, asphalt race track located just outside Richmond, Virginia in Henrico County. It hosts the Monster Energy NASCAR Cup Series and Xfinity Series. Known as "America's premier short track", it formerly hosted a NASCAR Gander Outdoors Truck Series race, an IndyCar Series race, and two USAC sprint car races. Richmond Raceway is also one of only a few tracks to host all of its events at night.

== Entry list ==
No.	Driver	Team	Manufacturer
00	Cole Custer	Stewart-Haas Racing with Biagi-DenBeste Racing	Ford
0	Garrett Smithley	JD Motorsports	Chevrolet
01	Ryan Repko	JD Motorsports	Chevrolet
1	Michael Annett	JR Motorsports	Chevrolet
2	Tyler Reddick	Richard Childress Racing	Chevrolet
4	Stephen Leicht	JD Motorsports	Chevrolet
5	Vinnie Miller	B. J. McLeod Motorsports	Chevrolet
07	Ray Black Jr.	SS-Green Light Racing	Chevrolet
7	Justin Allgaier	JR Motorsports	Chevrolet
08	Gray Gaulding (R)	SS-Green Light Racing	Chevrolet
8	Zane Smith	JR Motorsports	Chevrolet
9	Noah Gragson (R)	JR Motorsports	Chevrolet
11	Justin Haley (R)	Kaulig Racing	Chevrolet
13	Stan Mullis	MBM Motorsports	Toyota
15	B. J. McLeod	JD Motorsports	Chevrolet
17	Joe Nemechek (i)	Rick Ware Racing	Chevrolet
18	Harrison Burton (i)	Joe Gibbs Racing	Toyota
19	Brandon Jones	Joe Gibbs Racing	Toyota
20	Christopher Bell	Joe Gibbs Racing	Toyota
21	Joe Graf Jr.	Richard Childress Racing	Chevrolet
22	Austin Cindric	Team Penske	Ford
23	John Hunter Nemechek (R)	GMS Racing	Chevrolet
35	Joey Gase	MBM Motorsports	Toyota
36	Josh Williams	DGM Racing	Chevrolet
38	C. J. McLaughlin	RSS Racing	Chevrolet
39	Ryan Sieg	RSS Racing	Chevrolet
51	Jeremy Clements	Jeremy Clements Racing	Chevrolet
52	David Starr	Jimmy Means Racing	Chevrolet
61	Chad Finchum	MBM Motorsports	Toyota
66	Mike Marlar (i)	MBM Motorsports	Toyota
74	Tyler Matthews	Mike Harmon Racing	Chevrolet
78	J. J. Yeley	B. J. McLeod Motorsports	Toyota
86	Brandon Brown (R)	Brandonbilt Motorsports	Chevrolet
89	Landon Cassill	Shepherd Racing Ventures	Chevrolet
90	Dillon Bassett	DGM Racing	Chevrolet
93	Hermie Sadler	RSS Racing	Chevrolet
98	Chase Briscoe (R)	Stewart-Haas Racing with Biagi-DenBeste Racing	Ford
99	Matt Mills	B. J. McLeod Motorsports	Chevrolet

== Practice ==
Gray Gaulding was the fastest in the practice session with a time of 22.241 seconds and a speed of 121.397 mph (195.370 km/h).

Pos	No.	Driver	Team	Manufacturer	Time	Speed
1	08	Gray Gaulding (R)	SS-Green Light Racing	Chevrolet	22.241	121.397
2	00	Cole Custer	Stewart-Haas Racing with Biagi-DenBeste Racing	Ford	22.251	121.343
3	20	Christopher Bell	Joe Gibbs Racing	Toyota	22.314	121.000

== Qualifying ==
Austin Cindric scored the pole for the race with a time of 22.708 seconds and a speed of 118.901 mph (191.353 km/h).

=== Qualifying results ===
Pos	No	Driver	Team	Manufacturer	Time
1	22	Austin Cindric	Team Penske	Ford	22.708
2	7	Justin Allgaier	JR Motorsports	Chevrolet	22.826
3	2	Tyler Reddick	Richard Childress Racing	Chevrolet	22.863
4	20	Christopher Bell	Joe Gibbs Racing	Toyota	22.961
5	98	Chase Briscoe (R)	Stewart-Haas Racing with Biagi-DenBeste Racing	Ford	22.973
6	18	Harrison Burton (i)	Joe Gibbs Racing	Toyota	22.975
7	11	Justin Haley (R)	Kaulig Racing	Chevrolet	23.037
8	9	Noah Gragson (R)	JR Motorsports	Chevrolet	23.042
9	08	Gray Gaulding (R)	SS-Green Light Racing	Chevrolet	23.088
10	1	Michael Annett	JR Motorsports	Chevrolet	23.095
11	19	Brandon Jones	Joe Gibbs Racing	Toyota	23.107
12	00	Cole Custer	Stewart-Haas Racing with Biagi-DenBeste Racing	Ford	23.111
13	39	Ryan Sieg	RSS Racing	Chevrolet	23.116
14	51	Jeremy Clements	Jeremy Clements Racing	Chevrolet	23.121
15	8	Zane Smith	JR Motorsports	Chevrolet	23.136
16	21	Joe Graf Jr.	Richard Childress Racing	Chevrolet	23.166
17	89	Landon Cassill	Shepherd Racing Ventures	Chevrolet	23.189
18	07	Ray Black Jr.	SS-Green Light Racing	Chevrolet	23.310
19	01	Ryan Repko	JD Motorsports	Chevrolet	23.456
20	61	Chad Finchum	MBM Motorsports	Toyota	23.492
21	4	Stephen Leicht	JD Motorsports	Chevrolet	23.522
22	86	Brandon Brown (R)	Brandonbilt Motorsports	Chevrolet	23.525
23	99	Matt Mills	B. J. McLeod Motorsports	Chevrolet	23.629
24	74	Tyler Matthews	Mike Harmon Racing	Chevrolet	23.638
25	17	Joe Nemechek (i)	Rick Ware Racing	Chevrolet	23.652
26	90	Dillon Bassett	DGM Racing	Chevrolet	23.660
27	5	Vinnie Miller	B. J. McLeod Motorsports	Chevrolet	23.667
28	36	Josh Williams	DGM Racing	Chevrolet	23.685
29	52	David Starr	Jimmy Means Racing	Chevrolet	23.810
30	35	Joey Gase	MBM Motorsports	Toyota	23.863
31	66	Mike Marlar (i)	MBM Motorsports	Toyota	23.883
32	0	Garrett Smithley	JD Motorsports	Chevrolet	23.906
33	15	B. J. McLeod	JD Motorsports	Chevrolet	23.919
34	78	J. J. Yeley	B. J. McLeod Motorsports	Chevrolet	23.942
35	93	Hermie Sadler	RSS Racing	Chevrolet	24.361
36	38	C. J. McLaughlin	RSS Racing	Chevrolet	24.394
37	13	Stan Mullis	MBM Motorsports	Toyota	25.289
38	23	John Hunter Nemechek (R)	GMS Racing	Chevrolet	0.000

. – Playoffs driver

== Race ==
=== Summary ===
Austin Cindric started on pole. On lap 6, Christopher Bell took the lead from him and dominated the race, winning both stages. Aside from a few minor cautions, the race was relatively caution free. Bell was able to prevent Cindric and Cole Custer from passing him and won the stages with more than a 1-second gap. Bell won the race over Cindric by nearly a 2-second margin, locking himself into the next round. Custer also clinched a spot in the next round in points.

=== Stage Results ===
Stage One Laps: 75

Pos	No	Driver	Team	Manufacturer	Points
1	20	Christopher Bell	Joe Gibbs Racing	Toyota	10
2	22	Austin Cindric	Team Penske	Ford	9
3	9	Noah Gragson	JR Motorsports	Chevrolet	8
4	1	Michael Annett	JR Motorsports	Chevrolet	7
5	00	Cole Custer	Stewart-Haas Racing with Biagi-DenBeste	Ford	6
6	11	Justin Haley (R)	Kaulig Racing	Chevrolet	5
7	23	John Hunter Nemechek (R)	GMS Racing	Chevrolet	4
8	19	Brandon Jones	Joe Gibbs Racing	Toyota	3
9	98	Chase Briscoe (R)	Stewart-Haas Racing with Biagi-DenBeste	Ford	2
10	7	Justin Allgaier	JR Motorsports	Chevrolet	1

Stage Two Laps: 75

Pos	No	Driver	Team	Manufacturer	Points
1	20	Christopher Bell	Joe Gibbs Racing	Toyota	10
2	00	Cole Custer	Stewart-Haas Racing with Biagi-DenBeste	Ford	9
3	7	Justin Allgaier	JR Motorsports	Chevrolet	8
4	1	Michael Annett	JR Motorsports	Chevrolet	7
5	22	Austin Cindric	Team Penske	Ford	6
6	9	Noah Gragson	JR Motorsports	Chevrolet	5
7	98	Chase Briscoe (R)	Stewart-Haas Racing with Biagi-DenBeste	Ford	4
8	39	Ryan Sieg	RSS Racing	Chevrolet	3
9	18	Harrison Burton (i)	Joe Gibbs Racing	Toyota	0
10	23	John Hunter Nemechek (R)	GMS Racing	Chevrolet	1

=== Final Stage Results ===
Stage Three Laps: 100

Pos	Grid	No	Driver	Team	Manufacturer	Laps	Points
1	4	20	Christopher Bell	Joe Gibbs Racing	Toyota	250	60
2	1	22	Austin Cindric	Team Penske	Ford	250	50
3	12	00	Cole Custer	Stewart-Haas Racing with Biagi-Denbeste	Ford	250	49
4	2	7	Justin Allgaier	JR Motorsports	Chevrolet	250	42
5	5	98	Chase Briscoe (R)	Stewart-Haas Racing with Biagi-Denbeste	Ford	250	38
6	6	18	Harrison Burton (i)	Joe Gibbs Racing	Toyota	250	0
7	8	9	Noah Gragson (R)	JR Motorsports	Chevrolet	250	43
8	15	8	Zane Smith	JR Motorsports	Chevrolet	250	29
9	10	1	Michael Annett	JR Motorsports	Chevrolet	250	42
10	3	2	Tyler Reddick	Richard Childress Racing	Chevrolet	250	27
11	11	19	Brandon Jones	Joe Gibbs Racing	Toyota	250	29
12	13	39	Ryan Sieg	RSS Racing	Chevrolet	250	28
13	26	90	Dillon Bassett	DGM Racing	Chevrolet	249	24
14	16	21	Joe Graf Jr.	Richard Childress Racing	Chevrolet	249	23
15	38	23	John Hunter Nemechek (R)	GMS Racing	Chevrolet	249	27
16	14	51	Jeremy Clements	Jeremy Clements Racing	Chevrolet	249	21
17	7	11	Justin Haley (R)	Kaulig Racing	Chevrolet	249	25
18	18	07	Ray Black Jr.	SS-Green Light Racing	Chevrolet	248	19
19	19	01	Ryan Repko	JD Motorsports	Chevrolet	248	18
20	30	35	Joey Gase	MBM Motorsports	Toyota	248	17
21	34	78	J. J. Yeley	B. J. McLeod Motorsports	Toyota	247	16
22	9	08	Gray Gaulding (R)	SS-Green Light Racing	Chevrolet	247	15
23	28	36	Josh Williams	DGM Racing	Chevrolet	247	14
24	35	93	Hermie Sadler	RSS Racing	Chevrolet	247	0
25	29	52	David Starr	Jimmy Means Racing	Chevrolet	247	12
26	20	61	Chad Finchum	MBM Motorsports	Toyota	246	11
27	32	0	Garrett Smithley	JD Motorsports	Chevrolet	246	10
28	23	99	Matt Mills	B. J. McLeod Motorsports	Chevrolet	244	9
29	21	4	Stephen Leicht	JD Motorsports	Chevrolet	241	8
30	33	15	B. J. McLeod	JD Motorsports	Chevrolet	240	7
31	36	38	C. J. McLaughlin	RSS Racing	Chevrolet	125	6
32	25	17	Joe Nemechek (i)	Rick Ware Racing	Chevrolet	85	0
33	24	74	Tyler Matthews	Mike Harmon Racing	Chevrolet	58	4
34	22	86	Brandon Brown (R)	Brandonbilt Motorsports	Chevrolet	55	3
35	27	5	Vinnie Miller	B. J. McLeod Motorsports	Chevrolet	50	2
36	17	89	Landon Cassill	Shepherd Racing Ventures	Chevrolet	24	1
37	37	13	Stan Mullis	MBM Motorsports	Toyota	18	1
38	31	66	Mike Marlar (i)	MBM Motorsports	Toyota	1	0

. – Playoffs driver

Previous race: 2019 Rhino Pro Truck Outfitters 300	NASCAR Xfinity Series; 2019 season	Next race: 2019 Drive for the Cure 250
