= Watsonville Speedway =

Racetrack

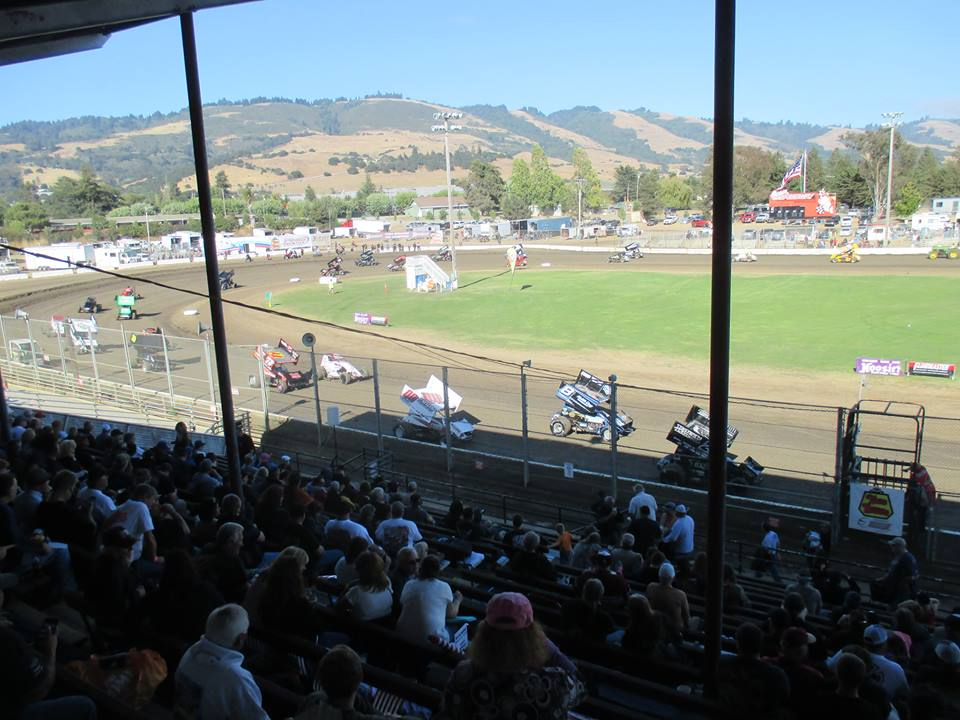
- The track (then as Ocean Speedway) on July 16, 2016
- Location: Watsonville, California
- Coordinates: 36.95201°N 121.73348°W
- Capacity: ~2,200
- Operator: SRE Promotions
- Opened: 1960
- Former names: Ocean Speedway
- Major events: Johnny Key Classic, Howard Kaeding Classic
- Surface: Clay
- Length: 0.250 mi (.402 km)
- Race lap record: 10.502 (Kaleb Montgomery, Kaleb Montgomery Racing, July 17, 2026, NARC King of the West Sprint Cars)

Watsonville Speedway, previously also known as Ocean Speedway, is a 1/4 mile dirt oval located in Watsonville, California, United States, at the Santa Cruz County Fairgrounds.

== History ==
The track was the brainchild of retired driver Bert Moreland and a small group of others in late 1959. They came up with a plan to put a 1/4 mile race track in the infield of the existing 1/2 mile horse track. The first race took place May 27, 1960 and was won by Art Eaton. Figure 8 racing was introduced to the area at the speedway in 1964 and was popular with fans and drivers. Ray Elder was one of the most notable drivers to compete at Watsonville Speedway in its early days. The track then turned to stock cars in the 1970s. Future NASCAR driver and Daytona 500 winner Ernie Irvan was turned away by the track for having illegal parts on his car, so he turned his attention to pavement-racing elsewhere. In the 1980s, the NASCAR late model stock cars were the feature division and were a part of the Winston Racing Series, where drivers could compete for national and regional points. Another NASCAR legend, Bobby Allison, raced at the track once, in 1983, in a late model. The Grand American Modifieds made their debut in 1990. Ken Schrader, Kenny Wallace, Geoff Bodine, Ernie Irvan and his father, Vic, ran a "Race of Champions" against each other in the modifieds in 1999 while they were in the area for the NASCAR race in Sonoma. A year later, Mike Skinner, Sterling Marlin, Jimmy Spencer, Vic Irvan, and track sponsor John Prentice competed in the second edition of the event. Super modifieds made sporadic appearances at the speedway in the 1960s and 1970s. Sprint cars also made appearances at the track on a staggered basis with local series, including the Northern Auto Racing Club (NARC) and the Golden State Challenge/King of California Series. The annual Trophy Cup was held once at the speedway in 2000.

== Ocean Speedway era ==
Former street stock and dwarf car driver Prentice took over operation of the track in 2006 and renamed it "Ocean Speedway", in alliance with the Ocean Chevrolet and Honda dealerships located in Santa Cruz County, where he worked as the general manager. Several years after Prentice acquired the track, a lawsuit was filed against the speedway and the fairgrounds by a neighborhood group called the Community Alliance for Fairgrounds Accountability, or CAFA, alleging the track was a nuisance due to the noise the cars produced. After being stayed three times while both parties looked for common ground, the lawsuit was dropped and races were allowed to continue with stricter sound rules and an earlier curfew. The track currently hosts a weekly 360 sprint car championship along with other divisions including IMCA modifieds and sportmods, midgets, dwarf cars, hobby stocks, and four-cylinders. The track also holds around six "police-N-pursuit" races a year, in which police officers, detectives, and other officials representing local agencies compete to raise money for Special Olympics of Northern California. In 2017, the group raised $34,000 for the charity. Travelling series that visit the track include the NARC/King of the West 410 sprint cars. The start of the 2020 season was delayed until June 19 due to the COVID-19 pandemic. The 2020 season was affected once more because of the CZU Lightning Complex fires burning nearby, cancelling races in August.

The name of the track was reverted to Watsonville Speedway ahead of the 2026 season. Past track champion, Robert Gallaher, was awarded the contract to operate the track for the 2026 season.

== Notable drivers ==
Some notable drivers who have made appearances at Ocean Speedway over the years include World of Outlaws champions Steve Kinser, Sammy Swindell, Mark Kinser, Danny Lasoski, Donny Schatz, Daryn Pittman, and Brad Sweet. Indianapolis 500 competitor, Bryan Clauson made his winged sprint car debut at the track in 2011. Current NASCAR driver Kyle Larson, former NASCAR drivers Kasey Kahne, Rico Abreu, Kraig Kinser, Tayler Malsam, and Tyler Walker have also raced at the track, along with Cheryl Glass, Doug McCoun, Ron Shuman, Lance Norick, Gio Scelzi, Jesse Love, Logan Seavey, Tanner Thorson, Shane Golobic, James Bondurant, David Gravel, Jac Haudenschild, Kerry Madsen, Joey Saldana, Lucas Wolfe, Dale Blaney, Johnny Herrera, Cory Kruseman, Brady Bacon, Brandon “Bud” Kaeding, Brent Kaeding, Michael Pickens, and Olympic athlete Josh Lakatos. 2023 NASCAR Xfinity Series champion Cole Custer won at the track in a USAC Jr. Ford Focus midget in 2011. Super Bowl XXIII champion linebacker, Sam Kennedy, races at the track in the hobby stocks on a now-and-then basis.

== List of track champions ==
Track championships have been awarded since the track opened in 1960 in the Claimer Division. The division was discontinued in 1964 in favor of the sportsman class. The micro 600s was a short-lived division at the track, awarding championships from 2008 to 2012. Champions in the division were: Devon Ostheimer in 2008, Orval Burke Jr. in 2009–10, Tomas Bray in 2011, and Alexander Mead in 2012.

Season	Sprint car	Wingless sprint	Modified	SportMod	Sportsman	Claimer/stock car	Street stock/late model	Figure 8	Dwarf car	American/hobby stock	4-banger
1960						Hap Barber					
1961						Art LaCost					
1962						Art LaCost					
1963						Lloyd Beard					
1964					Lloyd Beard						
1965					Ray Elder						
1966					Vic Irvan						
1967					Art LaCost	Dave Alonzo					
1968					Vic Irvan	Dave Snyder					
1969					Dennis Moomjean	Cecil Irvan		Cecil Irvan			
1970					Jerry Cecil	Joe Esperanca		Lloyd Keldsen Sr.			
1971					Ron Gravelle	Dave Tannahill		Lloyd Keldsen Sr.			
1972					Vern Willhoite	Johnny Brazil Jr.		Lloyd Keldsen Jr.			
1973					John Harper	Ray Johnson		Johnny Brazil Jr.			
1974					Jerry Cecil	Dennis Wilson		Ken Nott			
1975					Roy Pruett	Doug McCoun		Bob Benge			
1976					George Steitz	Ray Johnson		Ken Naber			
1977					Duane Noe	Dave Brightwell		Ken Nott			
1978					Jerry Cecil	Ray Morgan		Jerry Cutler			
1979					Duane Noe	Ray Morgan		John Keldsen			
1980					Duane Noe	Ted Stofle	Jim Reno	Johnny Brazil Jr.			
1981					Jerry Cecil	Ray Morgan	Bobby Large	Ken Nott			
1982						Doug McCoun	Kevin Pylant	John Keldsen			
1983						Dave Byrd	Kevin Pylant	Lloyd Keldsen Jr.			
1984						Doug McCoun	Kim Beard	Jim Pettit			
1985						Kevin Pylant	Ken Morgan	Peter Gates			
1986						Ray Morgan	Todd Souza	John Keldsen			
1987						Ed Sans Jr.	Lloyd Antonetti Jr.	John Keldsen			
1988						Ed Sans Jr.	Mike Brumit	Jim Gillespie			
1989						Jim Pettit II	Lloyd Antonetti Jr.	Jim Gillespie			
1990			Scott Busby			Jeff Silva	Bobby Large	Greg McGregor			
1991			Mike Brumit			Jeff Silva	Bart Reid	Paul Larsen			
1992			Scott Busby			Bobby Scott Jr.	Ron Parker				
1993			Scott Busby			Robert Miller	Kurt Slama				
1994			Dave Byrd				Don Silva	Fred Lind			
1995			Dave Byrd				Mike Cecil	Jim Gillespie			
1996			Kenny Nott				Ricky Sanders	John Keldsen		Ken Jepsen	
1997			Bobby Hogge IV				Doug Hagio	John Keldsen		Mike Meazell	
1998			Bobby Hogge IV				Dave Soito	Jim Gillespie		Jimmy Bowman	
1999			Bobby Hogge IV				Tim Clark Sr.	Mike Finlen Sr.		Sam Kennedy	
2000			Bobby Scott				Dennis Pelphrey	Doug Snodgrass		Sam Kennedy	
2001			Bobby Scott				Ken Gregg	Jim Gillespie		Rick Ray	
2002			Bobby Scott				Dennis Pelphrey	Doug Snodgrass		Sam Kennedy	
2003			Bobby Hogge IV				Dennis Pelphrey	John Keldsen	John Prentice	Sam Kennedy	
2004			Kenny Nott				Dennis Pelphrey	Jim Gillespie	Howard Fergerson	Sam Kennedy	
2005		Steve Pemberton	Garrett Steitz				Dennis Pelphrey	Keith Trusso	Todd Damron	Sam Kennedy	Andrew Camperud
2006		Steve Pemberton	Tim Balding				Jeff Decker	Jim Gillespie	Matt Sargent	Tim Clark Sr.	Andrew Camperud
2007	Brent Kaeding	N/A	Kenny Nott				Jeff Decker		N/A	Billy Nelson	Kyle Thorne
2008	Brent Kaeding	Ryan Bernal	Robert Marsh				Bobby Hogge IV		Ryan Diatte	Austin Burke	Jeff Wilson
2009	Tommy Tarlton	Billy Aton	Kenny Nott				Jeff Decker		Gilbert Toste	William Kennedy	Matt Sotomayor
2010	Tommy Tarlton	Ryan Bernal	Kenny Nott				Bobby Scott		Ryan Diatte	Billy Nelson	Adriane deSousa
2011	Ronnie Day	Jim Christian	Brian Cass				Clay Daly		Shawn Jones	Nick Silva	Adriane deSousa
2012	Shane Golobic	Jim Christian	Jim Pettit II	Matt Sotomayor			Clay Daly		Terre Rothweiler	Matt Kile	Dan McCabe
2013	Brad Furr	Tommy Laliberte	Andy Obertello	Stephen Hopf					Camron Diatte	Terry Campion	Al Sotomayor
2014	Shane Golobic	Bryan Grier	Kenny Nott	Nick Spainhoward					Terre Rothweiler	Billy Nelson	Justin McPherson
2015	Justin Sanders		Bobby Hogge IV	Matthew Hagio					Gene Pires Jr.	Terry Campion	Luke Babcock
2016	Brad Furr		Bobby Hogge IV	Jim DiGiovanni					David Teves	Robert Gallaher	DJ Keldsen
2017	Geoff Ensign		Nick DeCarlo	Matthew Hagio					Camron Diatte	Robert Gallaher	Bill Beardsley
2018	Brad Furr		Cody Burke	Jim DiGiovanni					Gene Pires Jr.	Matt Kile	Kate Beardsley
2019	JJ Ringo		Austin Burke	Jarrod Mounce					Mark Biscardi	Robert Gallaher	Nicole Beardsley
2020	Mitchell Faccinto		Cody Burke	Adriane deSousa						Joe Gallaher	Ryan McClelland
2021	Bud Kaeding		Cody Burke	Randy Miller						Joe Gallaher	Tony Gullo
2022	Kurt Nelson		Jim Pettit II	Jonathan Hagio						Joe Gallaher	Kenny Stragalinos
2023	Rickey Sanders		Jim Pettit II	Chuck Golden						Joe Gallaher	Jason Lazzerini
2024	Caleb Debem		Jim Pettit II	Emali VanHoff						Joe Gallaher	Peter Vannerus
2025	Caleb Debem		Jim Pettit II	Danny Wagner						Ryan Hart	Joshua Silva

== See also ==
- List of dirt track ovals in the United States
- West Coast Stock Car Hall of Fame
- Dirt track racing
