= 2021 Food City Dirt Race =

NASCAR Cup Series race

Race details
- Race 7 of 36 in the 2021 NASCAR Cup Series
- Date: March 29, 2021
- Location: Bristol Motor Speedway in Bristol, Tennessee
- Course: Permanent racing facility
- Course length: 0.533 miles (0.858 km)
- Distance: 253 laps, 134.849 mi (217.018 km)
- Scheduled distance: 250 laps, 133.25 mi (214.445 km)
- Average speed: 46.313 miles per hour (74.534 km/h)

Pole position
Driver	Kyle Larson	Hendrick Motorsports

Most laps led
Driver	Martin Truex Jr.	Joe Gibbs Racing
- Laps: 122

Winner
No. 22	Joey Logano	Team Penske

Television in the United States
- Network: Fox
- Announcers: Mike Joy, Jeff Gordon and Clint Bowyer
- Nielsen ratings: 3.114 million

Radio in the United States
- Radio: PRN
- Booth announcers: Doug Rice and Mark Garrow
- Turn announcers: Rob Albright (Backstretch)

The 2021 Food City Dirt Race was a NASCAR Cup Series race held on March 29, 2021, at Bristol Motor Speedway in Bristol, Tennessee. Contested over 250 laps on the 0.533 miles (0.858 km) short track, it was the seventh race of the 2021 NASCAR Cup Series season. The normal concrete racing surface at Bristol was covered with 2,300 truckloads of red clay, reducing the banking from 28 to 19 degrees, and making for the Cup Series' first race on dirt since 1970.

== Report ==
=== Background ===
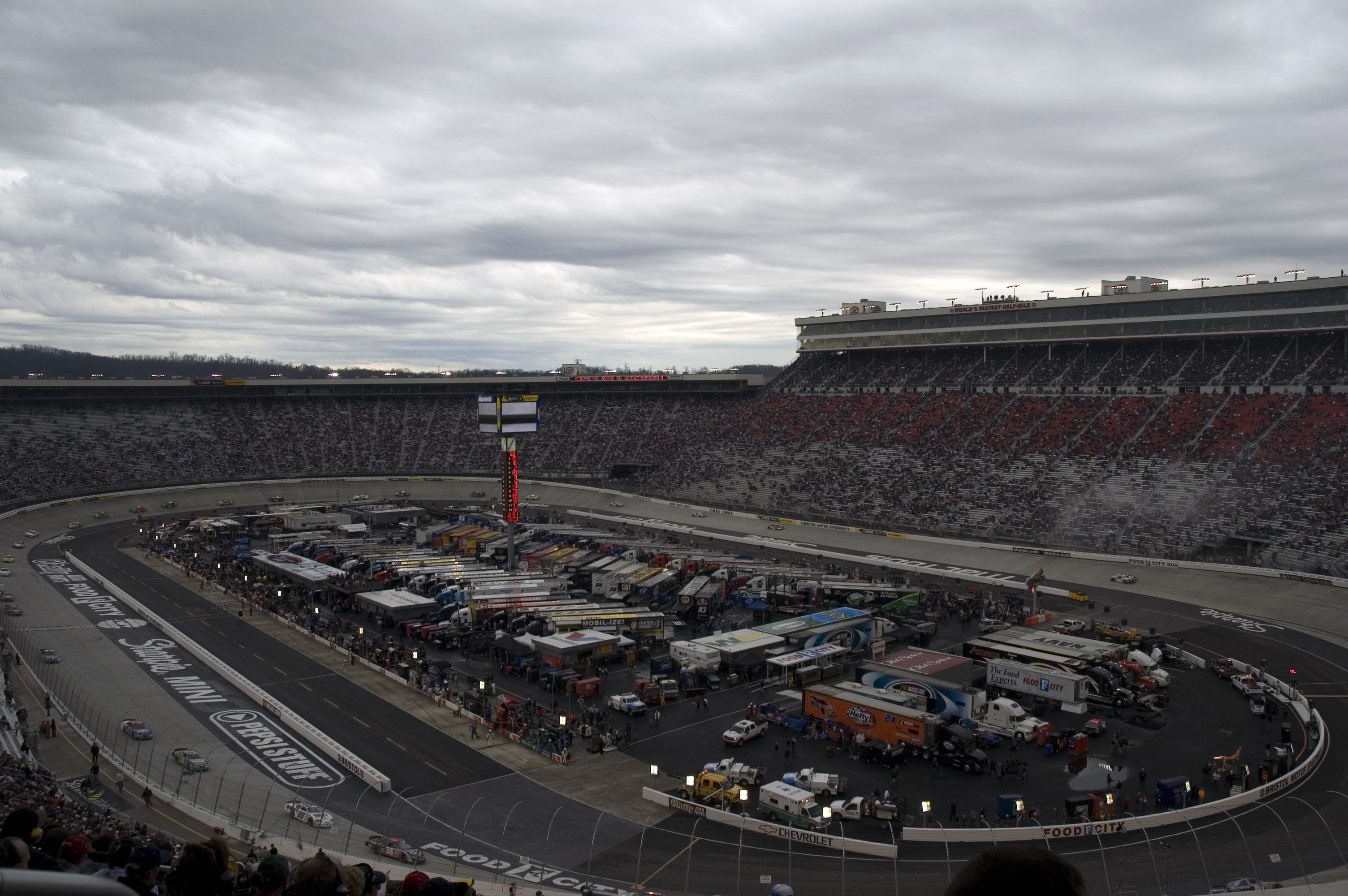
Bristol Motor Speedway, the track where the race was held.

Bristol Motor Speedway, formerly known as Bristol International Raceway and Bristol Raceway, is a NASCAR short track venue located in Bristol, Tennessee. Constructed in 1960, it held its first NASCAR race on July 30, 1961. Despite its short length, Bristol is among the most popular tracks on the NASCAR schedule because of its distinct features, which include extraordinarily steep banking, an all concrete surface, two pit roads, and stadium-like seating.

In 2021, the race shifted to a dirt surface version of the track and was renamed the Food City Dirt Race. On January 25, 2021, NASCAR announced the stage lengths of all events in all three series. According to the stage lengths, it states the race will consist of 250 laps.

==== Entry list ====
- (R) denotes rookie driver.
- (i) denotes driver who are ineligible for series driver points.

No.	Driver	Team	Manufacturer
00	Quin Houff	StarCom Racing	Chevrolet
1	Kurt Busch	Chip Ganassi Racing	Chevrolet
2	Brad Keselowski	Team Penske	Ford
3	Austin Dillon	Richard Childress Racing	Chevrolet
4	Kevin Harvick	Stewart-Haas Racing	Ford
5	Kyle Larson	Hendrick Motorsports	Chevrolet
6	Ryan Newman	Roush Fenway Racing	Ford
7	Corey LaJoie	Spire Motorsports	Chevrolet
8	Tyler Reddick	Richard Childress Racing	Chevrolet
9	Chase Elliott	Hendrick Motorsports	Chevrolet
10	Aric Almirola	Stewart-Haas Racing	Ford
11	Denny Hamlin	Joe Gibbs Racing	Toyota
12	Ryan Blaney	Team Penske	Ford
14	Chase Briscoe (R)	Stewart-Haas Racing	Ford
15	Chris Windom	Rick Ware Racing	Chevrolet
17	Chris Buescher	Roush Fenway Racing	Ford
18	Kyle Busch	Joe Gibbs Racing	Toyota
19	Martin Truex Jr.	Joe Gibbs Racing	Toyota
20	Christopher Bell	Joe Gibbs Racing	Toyota
21	Matt DiBenedetto	Wood Brothers Racing	Ford
22	Joey Logano	Team Penske	Ford
23	Bubba Wallace	23XI Racing	Toyota
24	William Byron	Hendrick Motorsports	Chevrolet
34	Michael McDowell	Front Row Motorsports	Ford
37	Ryan Preece	JTG Daugherty Racing	Chevrolet
38	Anthony Alfredo (R)	Front Row Motorsports	Ford
41	Cole Custer	Stewart-Haas Racing	Ford
42	Ross Chastain	Chip Ganassi Racing	Chevrolet
43	Erik Jones	Richard Petty Motorsports	Chevrolet
47	Ricky Stenhouse Jr.	JTG Daugherty Racing	Chevrolet
48	Alex Bowman	Hendrick Motorsports	Chevrolet
51	Cody Ware (i)	Petty Ware Racing	Chevrolet
52	Josh Bilicki	Rick Ware Racing	Ford
53	J. J. Yeley (i)	Rick Ware Racing	Chevrolet
66	Mike Marlar	MBM Motorsports	Toyota
77	Stewart Friesen (i)	Spire Motorsports	Chevrolet
78	Shane Golobic	Live Fast Motorsports	Ford
96	Ty Dillon (i)	Gaunt Brothers Racing	Toyota
99	Daniel Suárez	Trackhouse Racing Team	Chevrolet
Official entry list

== Practice ==
=== First practice ===
Alex Bowman was the fastest in the first practice session with a time of 20.155 seconds and a speed of 89.308 mph (143.727 km/h).

Pos	No.	Driver	Team	Manufacturer	Time	Speed
1	48	Alex Bowman	Hendrick Motorsports	Chevrolet	20.155	89.308
2	20	Christopher Bell	Joe Gibbs Racing	Toyota	20.225	88.999
3	18	Kyle Busch	Joe Gibbs Racing	Toyota	20.248	88.898
Official first practice results

=== Final practice ===
Ryan Blaney was the fastest in the final practice session with a time of 20.172 seconds and a speed of 89.233 mph (143.607 km/h).

Pos	No.	Driver	Team	Manufacturer	Time	Speed
1	12	Ryan Blaney	Team Penske	Ford	20.172	89.233
2	48	Alex Bowman	Hendrick Motorsports	Chevrolet	20.194	89.135
3	11	Denny Hamlin	Joe Gibbs Racing	Toyota	20.228	88.986
Official final practice results

== Qualifying heat races ==
Qualifying heat races were cancelled due to weather. As a result, NASCAR used the standard competition-based formula used in races where practice and qualifying are not being conducted for pandemic safety reasons. Denny Hamlin will start first as the control car, as Kyle Larson, who had the top score under the competition-based formula from the previous week, was penalised for an engine change in Friday practice over concerns of overheating in second practice.

=== Starting Lineup ===
Pos	No.	Driver	Team	Manufacturer
1	5	Kyle Larson	Hendrick Motorsports	Chevrolet
2	11	Denny Hamlin	Joe Gibbs Racing	Toyota
3	12	Ryan Blaney	Team Penske	Ford
4	18	Kyle Busch	Joe Gibbs Racing	Toyota
5	19	Martin Truex Jr.	Joe Gibbs Racing	Toyota
6	4	Kevin Harvick	Stewart-Haas Racing	Ford
7	48	Alex Bowman	Hendrick Motorsports	Chevrolet
8	24	William Byron	Hendrick Motorsports	Chevrolet
9	3	Austin Dillon	Richard Childress Racing	Chevrolet
10	22	Joey Logano	Team Penske	Ford
11	17	Chris Buescher	Roush Fenway Racing	Ford
12	21	Matt DiBenedetto	Wood Brothers Racing	Ford
13	47	Ricky Stenhouse Jr.	JTG Daugherty Racing	Chevrolet
14	6	Ryan Newman	Roush Fenway Racing	Ford
15	20	Christopher Bell	Joe Gibbs Racing	Toyota
16	34	Michael McDowell	Front Row Motorsports	Ford
17	42	Ross Chastain	Chip Ganassi Racing	Chevrolet
18	99	Daniel Suárez	Trackhouse Racing Team	Chevrolet
19	23	Bubba Wallace	23XI Racing	Toyota
20	2	Brad Keselowski	Team Penske	Ford
21	41	Cole Custer	Stewart-Haas Racing	Ford
22	37	Ryan Preece	JTG Daugherty Racing	Chevrolet
23	10	Aric Almirola	Stewart-Haas Racing	Ford
24	43	Erik Jones	Richard Petty Motorsports	Chevrolet
25	14	Chase Briscoe (R)	Stewart-Haas Racing	Ford
26	9	Chase Elliott	Hendrick Motorsports	Chevrolet
27	8	Tyler Reddick	Richard Childress Racing	Chevrolet
28	1	Kurt Busch	Chip Ganassi Racing	Chevrolet
29	38	Anthony Alfredo (R)	Front Row Motorsports	Ford
30	7	Corey LaJoie	Spire Motorsports	Chevrolet
31	51	Cody Ware (i)	Petty Ware Racing	Chevrolet
32	77	Stewart Friesen (i)	Spire Motorsports	Chevrolet
33	00	Quin Houff	StarCom Racing	Chevrolet
34	53	J. J. Yeley (i)	Rick Ware Racing	Chevrolet
35	78	Shane Golobic	Live Fast Motorsports	Ford
36	15	Chris Windom	Rick Ware Racing	Chevrolet
37	52	Josh Bilicki	Rick Ware Racing	Ford
38	66	Mike Marlar	MBM Motorsports	Toyota
39	96	Ty Dillon (i)	Gaunt Brothers Racing	Toyota
Official starting lineup

== Race ==
The race was delayed to Monday after rain caused flooding in the area. Logano won the race. There were some visibility problems because of dust and mud. Larson and Bell were the pre-race favorites but crashed out. Truex won the first stage and Suárez led in the second before being passed by Logano. The race was extended following a late caution-period. Hamlin was slow at the final restart and Truex had a flat tire, allowing Stenhouse to come second. Suárez was fourth behind Hamlin and ahead of Newman. During the race it was announced that the race would again be held on dirt during the 2022 NASCAR Cup Series.

=== Stage Results ===
Stage One Laps: 100

Pos	No	Driver	Team	Manufacturer	Points
1	19	Martin Truex Jr.	Joe Gibbs Racing	Toyota	10
2	24	William Byron	Hendrick Motorsports	Chevrolet	9
3	11	Denny Hamlin	Joe Gibbs Racing	Toyota	8
4	99	Daniel Suárez	Trackhouse Racing Team	Chevrolet	7
5	12	Ryan Blaney	Team Penske	Ford	6
6	22	Joey Logano	Team Penske	Ford	5
7	23	Bubba Wallace	23XI Racing	Toyota	4
8	6	Ryan Newman	Roush Fenway Racing	Ford	3
9	47	Ricky Stenhouse Jr.	JTG Daugherty Racing	Chevrolet	2
10	17	Chris Buescher	Roush Fenway Racing	Ford	1
Official stage one results

Stage Two Laps: 100

Pos	No	Driver	Team	Manufacturer	Points
1	22	Joey Logano	Team Penske	Ford	10
2	99	Daniel Suárez	Trackhouse Racing Team	Chevrolet	9
3	11	Denny Hamlin	Joe Gibbs Racing	Toyota	8
4	19	Martin Truex Jr.	Joe Gibbs Racing	Toyota	7
5	6	Ryan Newman	Roush Fenway Racing	Ford	6
6	47	Ricky Stenhouse Jr.	JTG Daugherty Racing	Chevrolet	5
7	23	Bubba Wallace	23XI Racing	Toyota	4
8	43	Erik Jones	Richard Petty Motorsports	Chevrolet	3
9	8	Tyler Reddick	Richard Childress Racing	Chevrolet	2
10	9	Chase Elliott	Hendrick Motorsports	Chevrolet	1
Official stage two results

=== Final Stage Results ===
Stage Three Laps: 50

Pos	Grid	No	Driver	Team	Manufacturer	Laps	Points
1	10	22	Joey Logano	Team Penske	Ford	253	55
2	13	47	Ricky Stenhouse Jr.	JTG Daugherty Racing	Chevrolet	253	42
3	2	11	Denny Hamlin	Joe Gibbs Racing	Toyota	253	50
4	18	99	Daniel Suárez	Trackhouse Racing Team	Chevrolet	253	49
5	14	6	Ryan Newman	Roush Fenway Racing	Ford	253	41
6	8	24	William Byron	Hendrick Motorsports	Chevrolet	253	40
7	27	8	Tyler Reddick	Richard Childress Racing	Chevrolet	253	32
8	3	12	Ryan Blaney	Team Penske	Ford	253	35
9	24	43	Erik Jones	Richard Petty Motorsports	Chevrolet	253	31
10	26	9	Chase Elliott	Hendrick Motorsports	Chevrolet	253	28
11	20	2	Brad Keselowski	Team Penske	Ford	253	26
12	16	34	Michael McDowell	Front Row Motorsports	Ford	253	25
13	12	21	Matt DiBenedetto	Wood Brothers Racing	Ford	253	24
14	11	17	Chris Buescher	Roush Fenway Racing	Ford	253	24
15	6	4	Kevin Harvick	Stewart-Haas Racing	Ford	253	22
16	28	1	Kurt Busch	Chip Ganassi Racing	Chevrolet	253	21
17	4	18	Kyle Busch	Joe Gibbs Racing	Toyota	253	20
18	22	37	Ryan Preece	JTG Daugherty Racing	Chevrolet	253	19
19	5	19	Martin Truex Jr.	Joe Gibbs Racing	Toyota	253	35
20	25	14	Chase Briscoe (R)	Stewart-Haas Racing	Ford	252	17
21	9	3	Austin Dillon	Richard Childress Racing	Chevrolet	252	16
22	7	48	Alex Bowman	Hendrick Motorsports	Chevrolet	252	15
23	32	77	Stewart Friesen (i)	Spire Motorsports	Chevrolet	252	0
24	21	41	Cole Custer	Stewart-Haas Racing	Ford	252	13
25	33	00	Quin Houff	StarCom Racing	Chevrolet	252	12
26	39	96	Ty Dillon (i)	Gaunt Bros Racing	Toyota	252	0
27	19	23	Bubba Wallace	23XI Racing	Toyota	251	18
28	34	53	J. J. Yeley (i)	Rick Ware Racing	Chevrolet	249	0
29	1	5	Kyle Larson	Hendrick Motorsports	Chevrolet	248	8
30	37	52	Josh Bilicki	Rick Ware Racing	Ford	247	7
31	38	66	Mike Marlar	MBM Motorsports	Toyota	244	6
32	31	51	Cody Ware (i)	Petty Ware Racing	Chevrolet	242	0
33	36	15	Chris Windom	Rick Ware Racing	Chevrolet	62	4
34	15	20	Christopher Bell	Joe Gibbs Racing	Toyota	54	3
35	17	42	Ross Chastain	Chip Ganassi Racing	Chevrolet	52	2
36	23	10	Aric Almirola	Stewart-Haas Racing	Ford	39	1
37	35	78	Shane Golobic	Live Fast Motorsports	Ford	39	1
38	30	7	Corey LaJoie	Spire Motorsports	Chevrolet	39	1
39	29	38	Anthony Alfredo (R)	Front Row Motorsports	Ford	39	1
Official race results

=== Race statistics ===
- Lead changes: 5 among 5 different drivers
- Cautions/Laps: 10 for 37
- Red flags: 1 for 6 minutes and 30 seconds
- Time of race: 2 hours, 43 minutes and 53 seconds
- Average speed: 46.313 miles per hour (74.534 km/h)

== Media ==
=== Television ===
The Food City Dirt Race was carried by Fox in the United States. Mike Joy, five-time Bristol winner Jeff Gordon and Clint Bowyer called the race from the broadcast booth. Jamie Little, Regan Smith and Vince Welch handled pit road duties for the television side. Larry McReynolds provided insight from the Fox Sports studio in Charlotte.

Fox
Booth announcers	Pit reporters	In-race analyst
Lap-by-lap: Mike Joy; Color-commentator: Jeff Gordon; Color-commentator: Clint Bowyer	Jamie Little; Regan Smith; Vince Welch	Larry McReynolds

=== Radio ===
PRN had the radio call for the race which was simulcasted on Sirius XM NASCAR Radio. Doug Rice and Mark Garrow called the race in the booth when the field raced down the frontstretch. Rob Albright called the race from atop the turn 3 suites when the field raced down the backstretch. Brad Gillie, Brett McMillan, Lenny Batycki and Wendy Venturini covered the action on pit lane for PRN.

PRN
Booth announcers	Turn announcers	Pit reporters
Lead announcer: Doug Rice; Announcer: Mark Garrow	Backstretch: Rob Albright	Brad Gillie; Brett McMillan; Lenny Batycki; Wendy Venturini

== Standings after the race ==
Drivers' Championship standings

	Pos	Driver	Points
	1	Denny Hamlin	327
1	2	Joey Logano	269 (–58)
1	3	Martin Truex Jr.	247 (–80)
2	4	Kyle Larson	242 (–85)
	5	Brad Keselowski	232 (–95)
2	6	William Byron	228 (–99)
	7	Ryan Blaney	226 (–101)
2	8	Kevin Harvick	225 (–102)
1	9	Chase Elliott	211 (–116)
1	10	Christopher Bell	186 (–141)
	11	Austin Dillon	186 (–141)
1	12	Michael McDowell	183 (–144)
1	13	Kyle Busch	183 (–144)
3	14	Ricky Stenhouse Jr.	180 (–147)
	15	Kurt Busch	173 (–154)
2	16	Alex Bowman	172 (–155)
Official driver's standings

Manufacturers' Championship standings

Pos	Manufacturer	Points
1	Ford	257
2	Chevrolet	250 (–7)
3	Toyota	247 (–10)

- Note: Only the first 16 positions are included for the driver standings.
- . – Driver has clinched a position in the NASCAR Cup Series playoffs.

Previous race: 2021 Folds of Honor QuikTrip 500	NASCAR Cup Series; 2021 season	Next race: 2021 Blue-Emu Maximum Pain Relief 500
