= Magnolia State 100 =

Annual dirt track race held at Magnolia Motor Speedway in Columbus, Mississippi

The Magnolia State 100 is an annual dirt track race for super late model cars held at Magnolia Motor Speedway in Columbus, Mississippi. First held in 1989, the race was considered unique as one of the last remaining major dirt track events that is not sanctioned by a touring series in 2015.

Originally held at Whynot Motorsports Park, the race moved to South Mississippi Speedway, Pike County Speedway and Jackson Motor Speedway before settling at Columbus Speedway for eleven years. Starting in 2012, the event was scheduled to be held at Magnolia Motor Speedway, but was cancelled; starting with its 2013 running, the race was merged with Magnolia's Cotton Pickin' 100 as a combined event.

The 2020 event was web streamed by FloRacing with Crate Racin' USA Dirt Late Model Touring Series, sportsman, and factory stock.
