= 2021 Folds of Honor QuikTrip 500 =

NASCAR Cup Series race

Race details
- Race 6 of 36 in the 2021 NASCAR Cup Series
- Date: March 21, 2021
- Location: Atlanta Motor Speedway in Hampton, Georgia
- Course: Permanent racing facility
- Course length: 1.54 miles (2.48 km)
- Distance: 325 laps, 500.5 mi (806 km)
- Average speed: 144.595 miles per hour (232.703 km/h)

Pole position
Driver	Denny Hamlin	Joe Gibbs Racing
- Grid positions set by competition-based formula

Most laps led
Driver	Kyle Larson	Hendrick Motorsports
- Laps: 269

Winner
No. 12	Ryan Blaney	Team Penske

Television in the United States
- Network: Fox
- Announcers: Mike Joy, Jeff Gordon and Clint Bowyer
- Nielsen ratings: 3.724 million

Radio in the United States
- Radio: PRN
- Booth announcers: Doug Rice and Mark Garrow
- Turn announcers: Rob Albright (1 & 2) and Pat Patterson (3 & 4)

The 2021 Folds of Honor QuikTrip 500 was a NASCAR Cup Series race held on March 21, 2021, at Atlanta Motor Speedway in Hampton, Georgia. Contested over 325 laps on the 1.54-mile-long (2.48 km) asphalt quad-oval intermediate speedway, it was the sixth race of the 2021 NASCAR Cup Series season. Ryan Blaney won the race, driving a Ford. Kyle Larson led for 269 laps, but Blaney overtook him 8 laps from the end because Larson's tires were wearing out.

== Report ==
=== Background ===
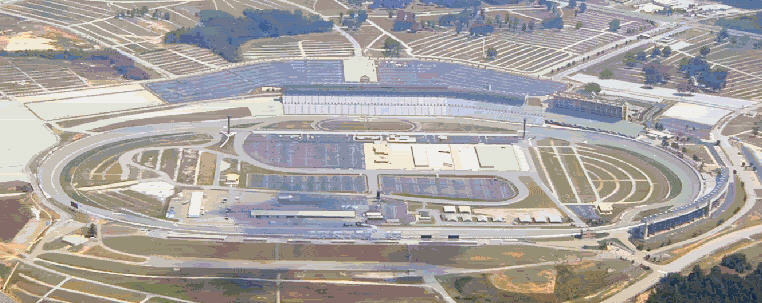
Atlanta Motor Speedway, the track where the race was held.

Atlanta Motor Speedway (formerly Atlanta International Raceway) is a track in Hampton, Georgia, 20 miles (32 km) south of Atlanta. It is a 1.54-mile (2.48 km) quad-oval track with a seating capacity of 111,000. It opened in 1960 as a 1.5-mile (2.4 km) standard oval. In 1994, 46 condominiums were built over the northeastern side of the track. In 1997, to standardize the track with Speedway Motorsports' other two 1.5-mile (2.4 km) ovals, the entire track was almost completely rebuilt. The frontstretch and backstretch were swapped, and the configuration of the track was changed from oval to quad-oval. The project made the track one of the fastest on the NASCAR circuit.

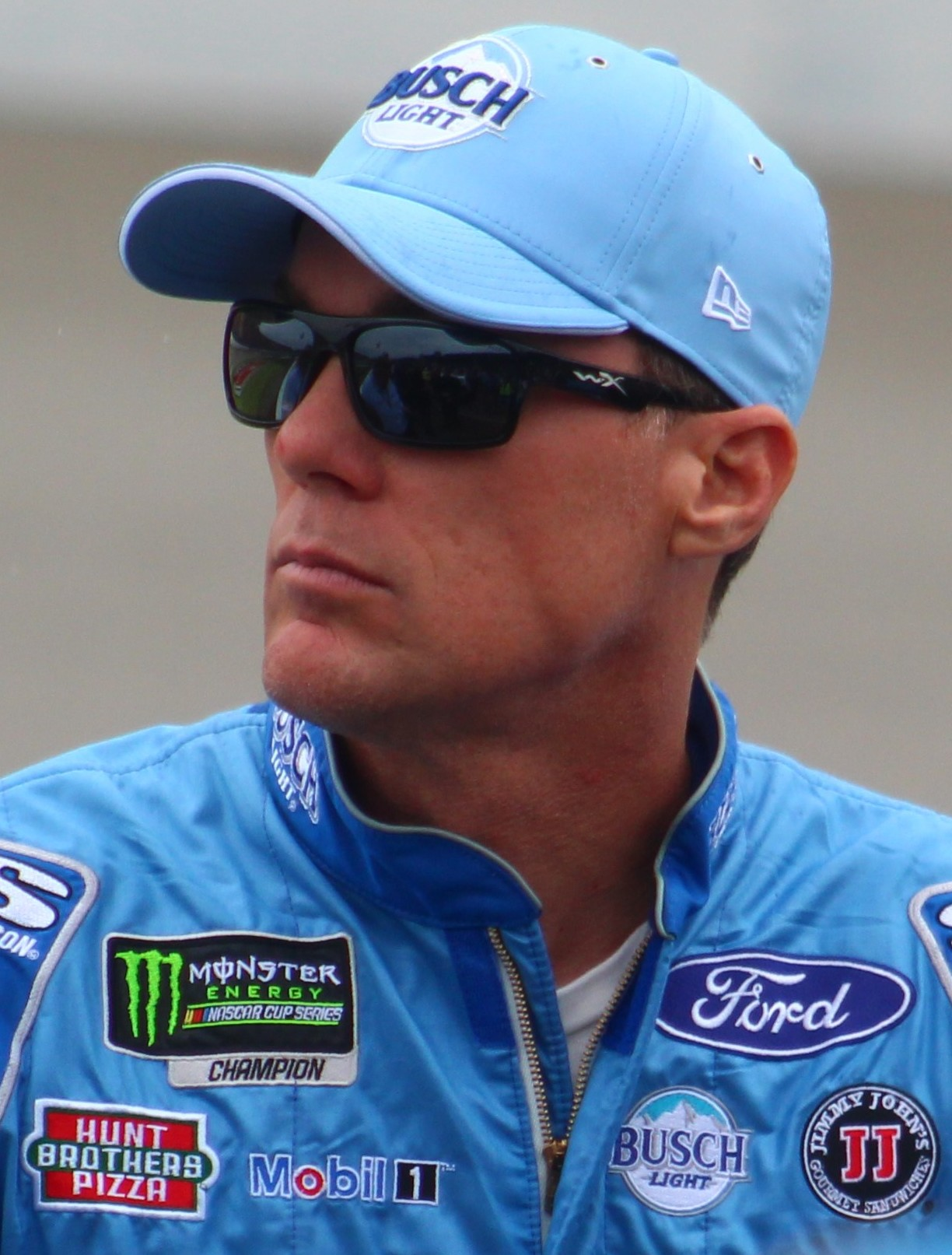
Defending race winner Kevin Harvick.

==== Entry list ====
- (R) denotes rookie driver.
- (i) denotes driver who are ineligible for series driver points.

No.	Driver	Team	Manufacturer
00	Quin Houff	StarCom Racing	Chevrolet
1	Kurt Busch	Chip Ganassi Racing	Chevrolet
2	Brad Keselowski	Team Penske	Ford
3	Austin Dillon	Richard Childress Racing	Chevrolet
4	Kevin Harvick	Stewart-Haas Racing	Ford
5	Kyle Larson	Hendrick Motorsports	Chevrolet
6	Ryan Newman	Roush Fenway Racing	Ford
7	Corey LaJoie	Spire Motorsports	Chevrolet
8	Tyler Reddick	Richard Childress Racing	Chevrolet
9	Chase Elliott	Hendrick Motorsports	Chevrolet
10	Aric Almirola	Stewart-Haas Racing	Ford
11	Denny Hamlin	Joe Gibbs Racing	Toyota
12	Ryan Blaney	Team Penske	Ford
14	Chase Briscoe (R)	Stewart-Haas Racing	Ford
15	James Davison	Rick Ware Racing	Chevrolet
17	Chris Buescher	Roush Fenway Racing	Ford
18	Kyle Busch	Joe Gibbs Racing	Toyota
19	Martin Truex Jr.	Joe Gibbs Racing	Toyota
20	Christopher Bell	Joe Gibbs Racing	Toyota
21	Matt DiBenedetto	Wood Brothers Racing	Ford
22	Joey Logano	Team Penske	Ford
23	Bubba Wallace	23XI Racing	Toyota
24	William Byron	Hendrick Motorsports	Chevrolet
33	Austin Cindric (i)	Team Penske	Ford
34	Michael McDowell	Front Row Motorsports	Ford
37	Ryan Preece	JTG Daugherty Racing	Chevrolet
38	Anthony Alfredo (R)	Front Row Motorsports	Ford
41	Cole Custer	Stewart-Haas Racing	Ford
42	Ross Chastain	Chip Ganassi Racing	Chevrolet
43	Erik Jones	Richard Petty Motorsports	Chevrolet
47	Ricky Stenhouse Jr.	JTG Daugherty Racing	Chevrolet
48	Alex Bowman	Hendrick Motorsports	Chevrolet
51	Cody Ware (i)	Petty Ware Racing	Chevrolet
52	Josh Bilicki	Rick Ware Racing	Ford
53	Joey Gase	Rick Ware Racing	Chevrolet
66	Timmy Hill (i)	MBM Motorsports	Ford
77	Justin Haley (i)	Spire Motorsports	Chevrolet
78	B. J. McLeod (i)	Live Fast Motorsports	Ford
99	Daniel Suárez	Trackhouse Racing Team	Chevrolet
Official entry list

== Qualifying ==
Denny Hamlin was awarded the pole for the race as determined by competition-based formula.

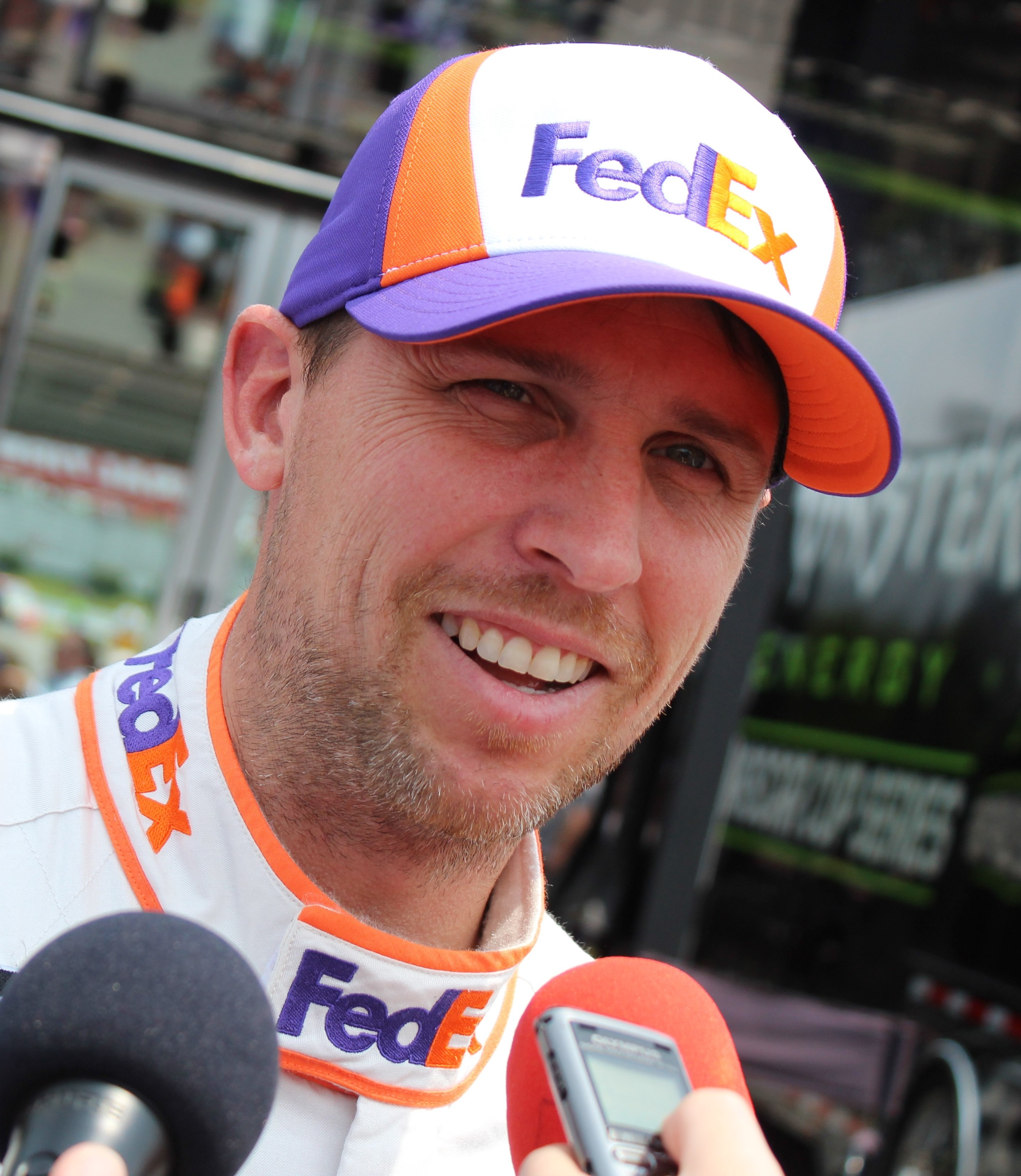
Pole sitter Denny Hamlin.

=== Starting Lineup ===
Pos	No.	Driver	Team	Manufacturer
1	11	Denny Hamlin	Joe Gibbs Racing	Toyota
2	19	Martin Truex Jr.	Joe Gibbs Racing	Toyota
3	22	Joey Logano	Team Penske	Ford
4	2	Brad Keselowski	Team Penske	Ford
5	9	Chase Elliott	Hendrick Motorsports	Chevrolet
6	5	Kyle Larson	Hendrick Motorsports	Chevrolet
7	4	Kevin Harvick	Stewart-Haas Racing	Ford
8	20	Christopher Bell	Joe Gibbs Racing	Toyota
9	24	William Byron	Hendrick Motorsports	Chevrolet
10	12	Ryan Blaney	Team Penske	Ford
11	1	Kurt Busch	Chip Ganassi Racing	Chevrolet
12	47	Ricky Stenhouse Jr.	JTG Daugherty Racing	Chevrolet
13	3	Austin Dillon	Richard Childress Racing	Chevrolet
14	48	Alex Bowman	Hendrick Motorsports	Chevrolet
15	23	Bubba Wallace	23XI Racing	Toyota
16	10	Aric Almirola	Stewart-Haas Racing	Ford
17	17	Chris Buescher	Roush Fenway Racing	Ford
18	34	Michael McDowell	Front Row Motorsports	Ford
19	18	Kyle Busch	Joe Gibbs Racing	Toyota
20	21	Matt DiBenedetto	Wood Brothers Racing	Ford
21	42	Ross Chastain	Chip Ganassi Racing	Chevrolet
22	43	Erik Jones	Richard Petty Motorsports	Chevrolet
23	37	Ryan Preece	JTG Daugherty Racing	Chevrolet
24	14	Chase Briscoe (R)	Stewart-Haas Racing	Ford
25	99	Daniel Suárez	Trackhouse Racing Team	Chevrolet
26	77	Justin Haley (i)	Spire Motorsports	Chevrolet
27	41	Cole Custer	Stewart-Haas Racing	Ford
28	6	Ryan Newman	Roush Fenway Racing	Ford
29	8	Tyler Reddick	Richard Childress Racing	Chevrolet
30	7	Corey LaJoie	Spire Motorsports	Chevrolet
31	78	B. J. McLeod (i)	Live Fast Motorsports	Ford
32	38	Anthony Alfredo (R)	Front Row Motorsports	Ford
33	51	Cody Ware (i)	Petty Ware Racing	Chevrolet
34	15	James Davison	Rick Ware Racing	Chevrolet
35	00	Quin Houff	StarCom Racing	Chevrolet
36	53	Joey Gase	Rick Ware Racing	Chevrolet
37	52	Josh Bilicki	Rick Ware Racing	Ford
38	66	Timmy Hill (i)	MBM Motorsports	Ford
39	33	Austin Cindric (i)	Team Penske	Ford
Official starting lineup

== Race ==
=== Stage 1 ===
The green flag was waved at 2:19 PM ET, with pole sitter Denny Hamlin jumping to an early lead, along with Martin Truex Jr. starting on his outside.

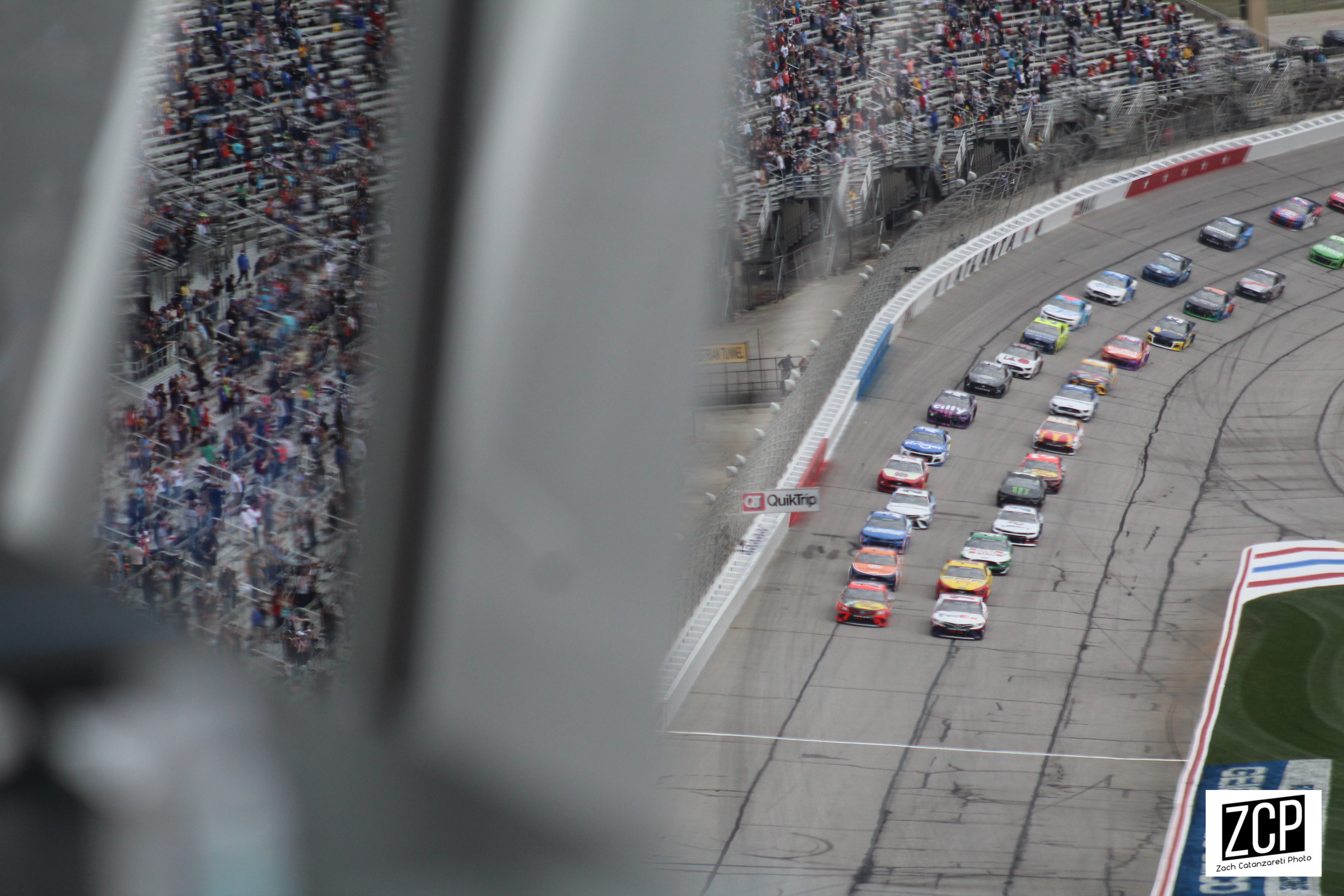
Initial lap 1 race start.

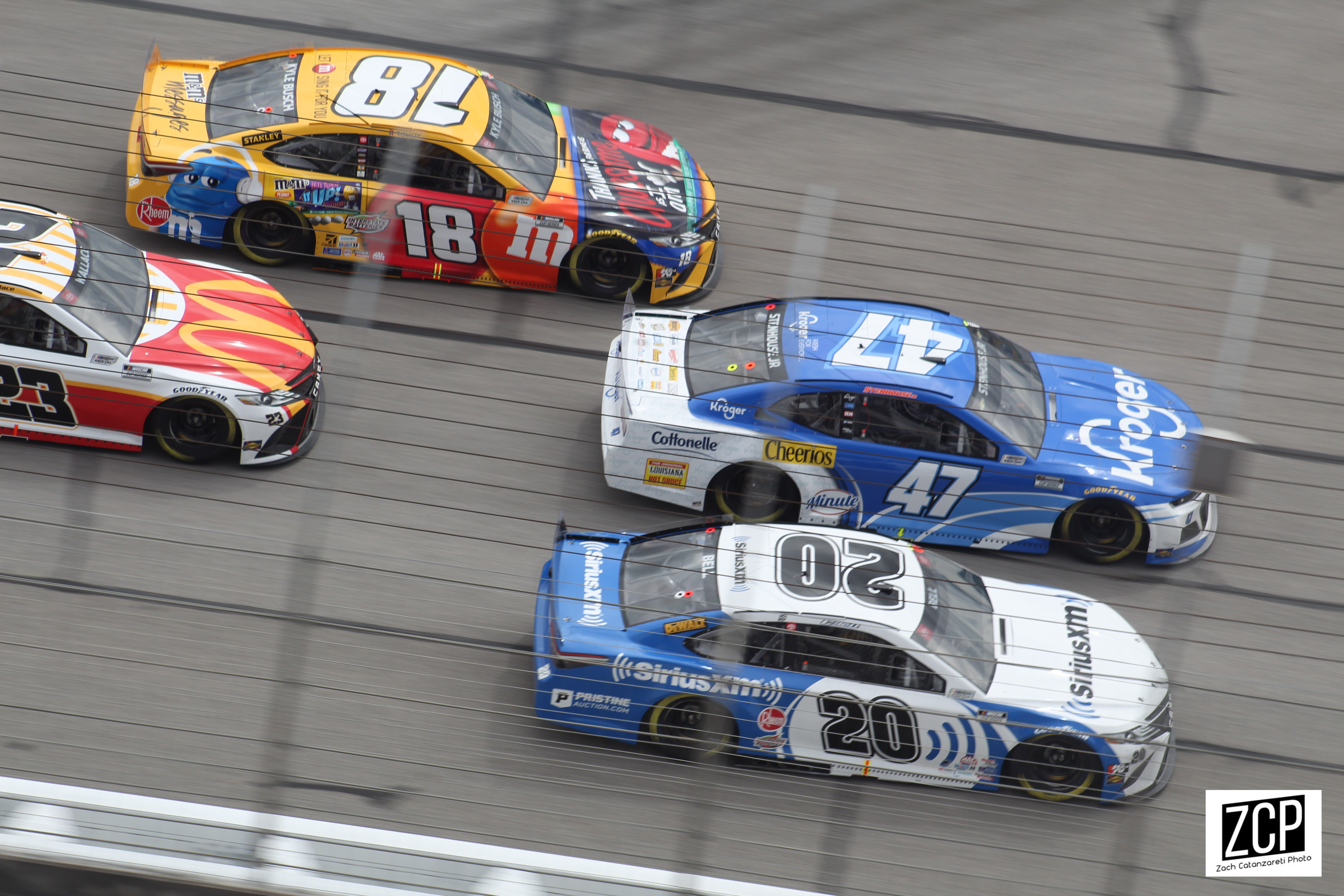
Ricky Stenhouse Jr., Christopher Bell, Kyle Busch, and Bubba Wallace battling for 12th coming to lap 4.

On lap 8, Ricky Stenhouse Jr. and Ross Chastain made slight contact while battling for 16th, as both were entering turn 3 off the back straightaway. Denny Hamlin would lead all 26 laps up until the competition caution waved on lap 26. Kyle Larson and Ryan Blaney notably moved up several positions early. Quin Houff, who was 32nd, would receive the free pass, and Kyle Larson would win the race off pit road with Denny Hamlin behind him in 2nd and Kevin Harvick in 3rd.

The race restarted on lap 31; however, Kevin Harvick, who was in 3rd, had to come down pit road before the green flag due to a tire issue. As Kyle Larson pulled ahead to the lead on the restart, Kevin Harvick barely stayed on the lead lap as he rejoined the field. No cautions would come out for the rest of Stage 1 as Kyle Larson dominated. Larson would cycle out to the lead once again after green-flag pit stops around lap 63 and eventually lapped Kevin Harvick, who was now 26th, on lap 74. Larson would go on to lead the rest of the stage. He was able to lap up to 20th place but could not pass 19th-place Daniel Suárez before Stage 1 concluded on lap 105.

=== Stage 2 ===
Aric Almirola would earn the free pass. Kyle Larson once again won the race off pit road with Kyle Busch and Ryan Blaney following behind him in 2nd and 3rd before the start of Stage 2. Ross Chastain was penalized because of an uncontrolled tire.

Stage 2 started on lap 113 with Kyle Larson leading on the inside and Kyle Busch in 2nd on the outside. Kyle Busch spun his tires on the restart, backing up the outside lane and stacking up those behind him, including Chase Elliott, Kurt Busch, Chris Buescher, and Denny Hamlin. Denny Hamlin made contact with Kurt Busch's bumper, sending him into the outside wall and ending Kurt Busch's day, while bringing out a caution on lap 113. Michael McDowell, who was running 21st before Kurt Busch wrecked, received the free pass.

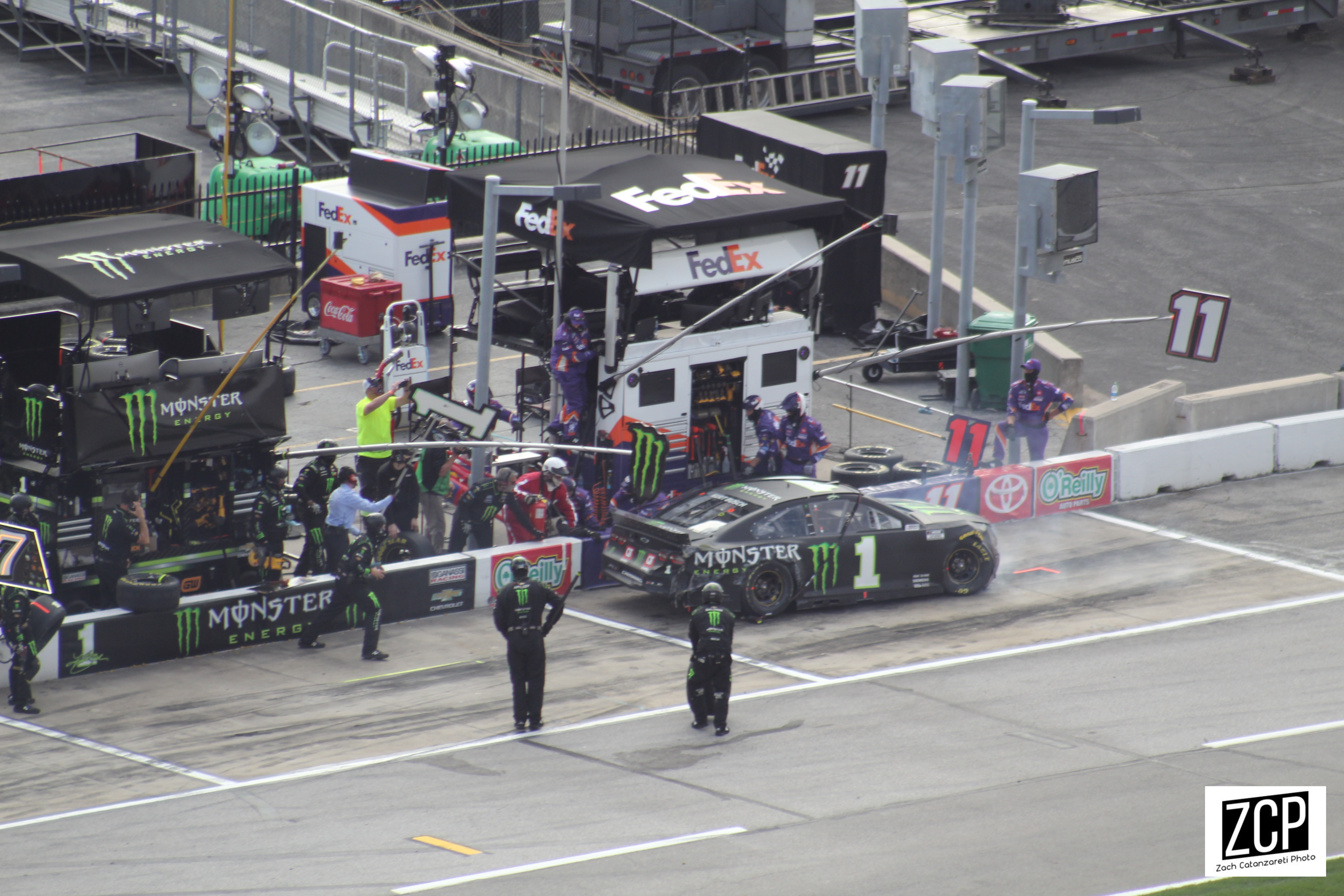
Kurt Busch on pit road after lap 113 accident.

On the ensuing restart on lap 119, Ryan Blaney briefly took the lead from Kyle Larson to lead the lap, but Larson quickly overtook him to regain control of the race. On lap 123, Martin Truex Jr., running 10th, slid up the track entering turn 3 and made contact with Brad Keselowski, who was running 12th, damaging the front end of Keselowski's car.

Green-flag pit stops began on lap 160 and continued until Brad Keselowski, who had been lapped by Kyle Larson on lap 141 and was running with a damaged car, finally pitted on lap 171. Kyle Larson once again cycled to the lead, and Stage 2 remained green the rest of the way, with Kyle Larson leading every lap after the lap 114 restart. As Stage 2 came to a close on lap 210, Larson had lapped up to 15th place, which included usual Atlanta contenders such as Kevin Harvick, the damaged and several-laps-down Brad Keselowski, and Joey Logano, who was running 15th and received the free pass.

=== Final stage ===
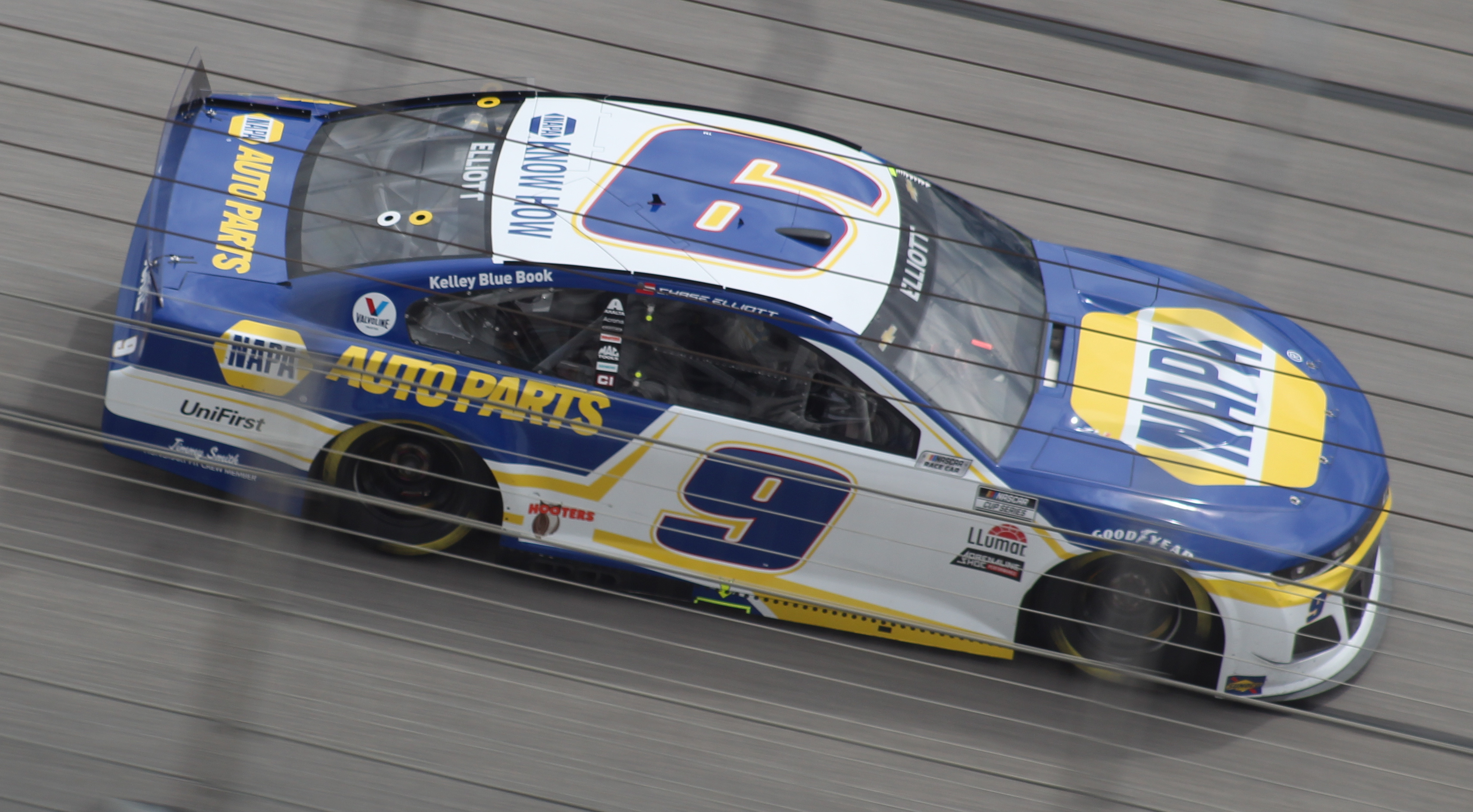
Chase Elliott racing at Atlanta.

Before the final stage, Kyle Larson narrowly won the race off pit road over Ryan Blaney in 2nd and Alex Bowman in 3rd. Both Blaney and Bowman chose the inside lane on the upcoming restart, setting William Byron up to lead the outside lane in 2nd.

On the lap 218 restart, Kyle Larson jumped out to another lead, bringing Ryan Blaney with him on the inside lane while William Byron and Matt DiBenedetto struggled to get a good jump on the outside lane. However, shortly after on lap 219, Chase Elliott's engine expired while running 14th, exiting turn 4 and bringing out a caution on lap 220, ending Elliott's day. Bubba Wallace received the free pass.

The leaders used the caution to pit on lap 221. This time, Ryan Blaney won the race off pit road ahead of Kyle Larson in 2nd and Alex Bowman in 3rd. Kyle Busch, who initially exited pit road 4th, was penalized for speeding on pit exit. 21 drivers waived their ability to pit and took the wave around. Cole Custer, Kevin Harvick, Ross Chastain, Michael McDowell, and Aric Almirola were the only ones among them able to get back onto the lead lap.

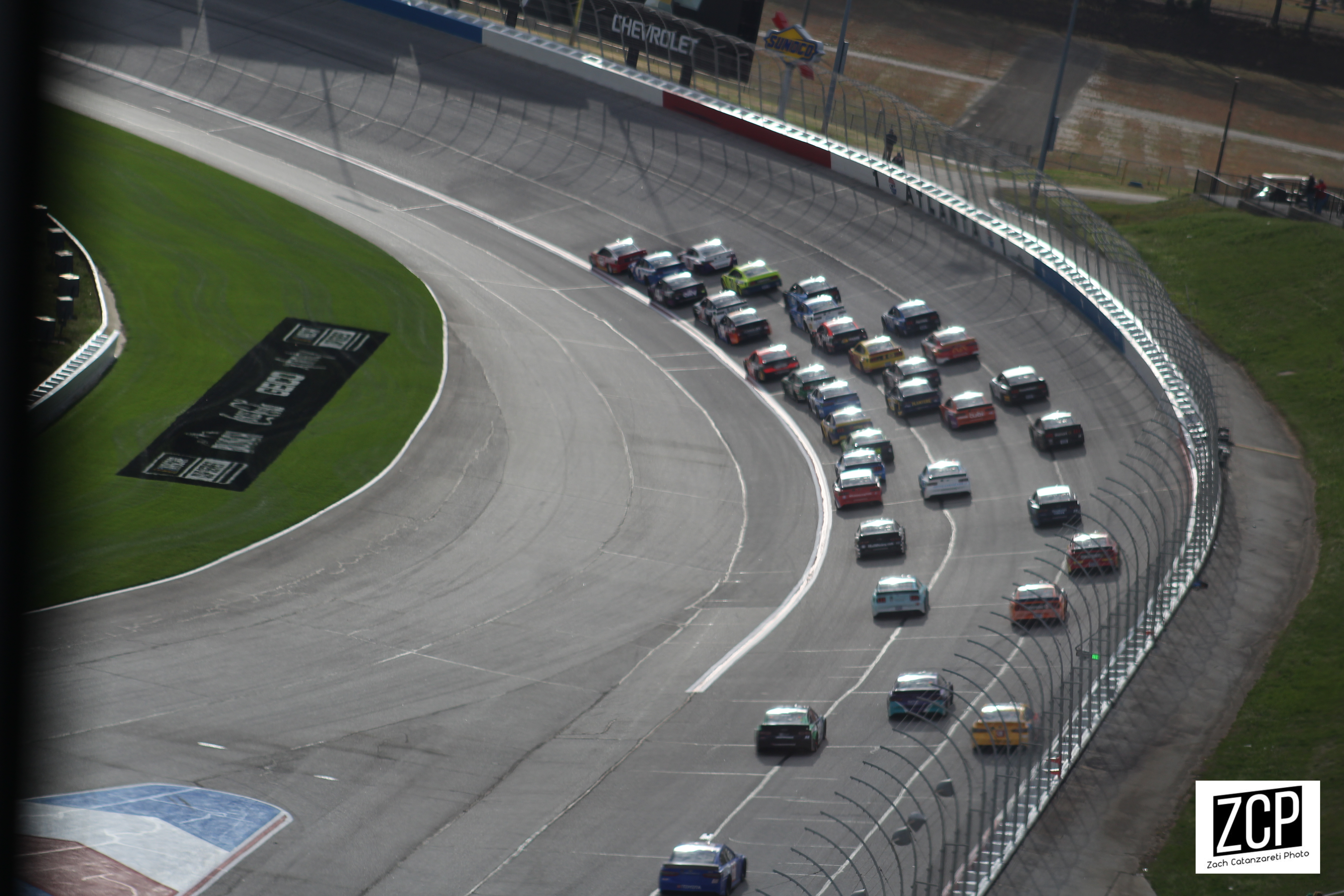
Lap 225 restart in Turn 1.

Ryan Blaney chose the inside lane to lead the restart while Hendrick Motorsports teammates Kyle Larson, Alex Bowman, and William Byron also rolled on the inside behind Blaney. Denny Hamlin elected to take Blaney's outside to restart in 2nd in front of Matt DiBenedetto and Ryan Newman.

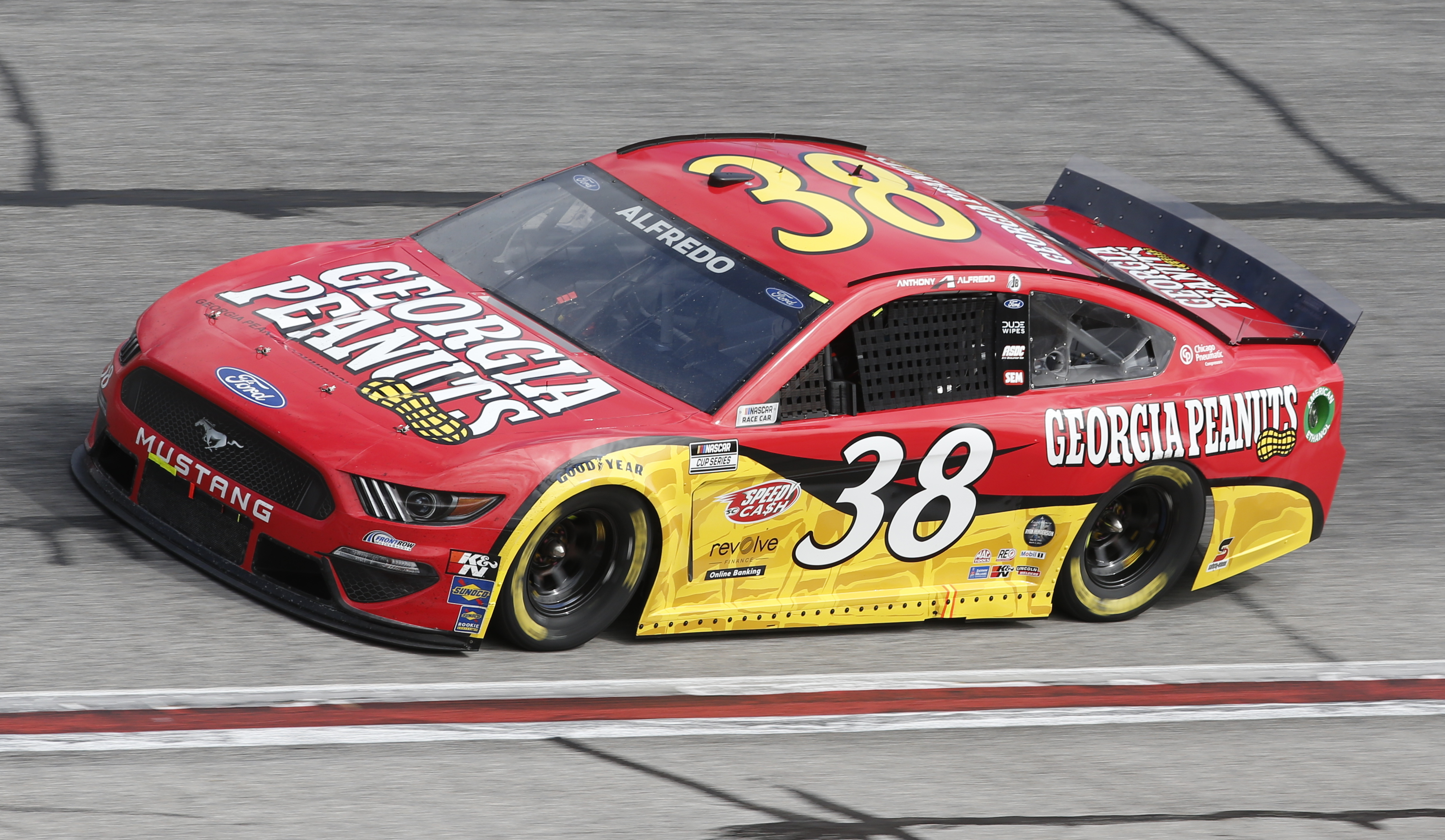
Anthony Alfredo racing at Atlanta.

The final restart went green on lap 225 with 100 to go in the race. Blaney managed to hold off Larson and Hamlin on the restart, building a 0.25-second lead before Larson managed to get around Hamlin. With 89 laps to go (lap 237), Ryan Blaney ceded the lead to a hard-charging Kyle Larson, so he could tuck in behind Larson's car and use the airflow to dislodge debris from his grill that was causing his engine to run hot. Blaney managed to get the debris off, but at the expense of Kyle Larson recapturing his lead, and extending it to continue his dominant day.

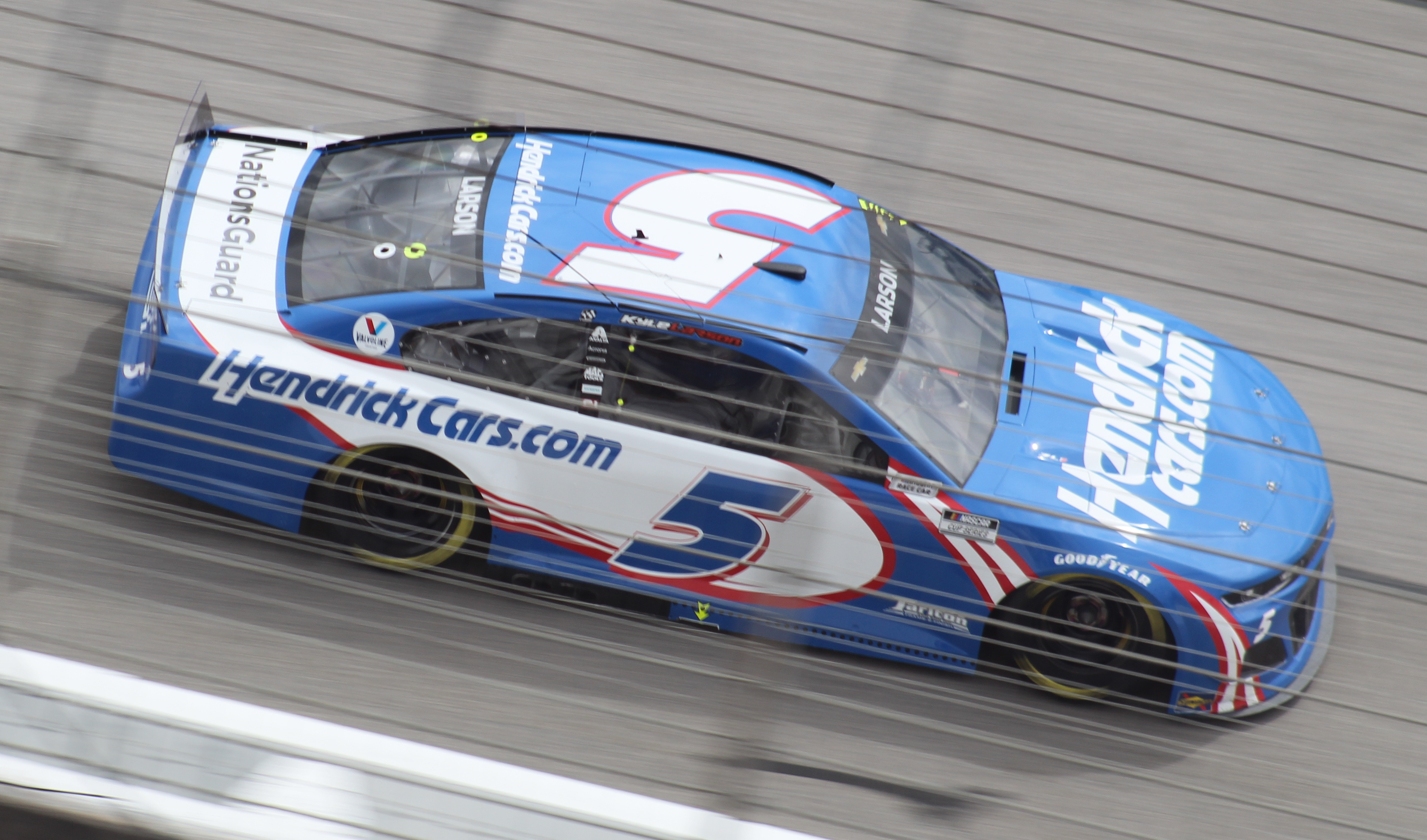
Kyle Larson racing at Atlanta.

Martin Truex Jr. kicked off the final cycle of green-flag pit stops on lap 267 with 59 to go. On lap 268, Daniel Suárez was penalized for speeding on pit-exit. Kyle Larson pitted from the lead shortly after on lap 269 along with Ryan Blaney in 2nd, who was 0.90 seconds behind Larson. Larson kept the lead on pit road and cycled to 2.25 seconds ahead of Ryan Blaney on lap 270. On the next lap, Anthony Alfredo, who was a lap down in 21st, spun fully around his box while pitting, almost hitting Aric Almirola's pit crew during the No. 10 team's pit stop, who were in 4th as they ran the last cycle long. No cars were damaged.

By lap 290, with 36 laps to go, Kyle Larson had extended his lead over Ryan Blaney to 3.1 seconds. However, by lap 296, Blaney had shrunken Larson's gap to only 2.1 seconds with 30 to go and continued to close in. Blaney's progress accelerated even more within the last twenty laps as Kyle Larson struggled to lap Ryan Blaney's Penske Racing teammate, Joey Logano, who was running in 15th. With 13 laps to go, Ryan Blaney was less than 0.85 seconds behind as Kyle Larson still couldn't find speed and remained five to six car lengths behind Logano. On lap 316 with 10 to go, Larson was hindered even more as he lost time navigating behind the lapped cars of Joey Gase and Timmy Hill, who were both running 35th and 36th. Blaney trailed Larson by just 0.45 seconds before reeling him in with 9 laps to go. Coming to the line with 8 laps remaining (lap 318), Blaney powered underneath Larson on the tri-oval to take the lead.

With 6 laps left, Corey LaJoie — running 29th — hit the wall entering Turn 1 but managed to bring his car down pit road without drawing a caution. Larson struggled to regain momentum, falling 0.97 seconds behind Blaney on worn tires, especially after getting held up by Blaney's Penske teammate Brad Keselowski, who was 28th and several laps down.

Ryan Blaney took the white flag and held off Kyle Larson by 2.083 seconds to capture the win. Despite leading a race-high 269 laps, Larson had to settle for 2nd, while Blaney secured his fifth career win after leading just 25 laps.

=== Stage Results ===
Stage One Laps: 105

Pos	No	Driver	Team	Manufacturer	Points
1	5	Kyle Larson	Hendrick Motorsports	Chevrolet	10
2	18	Kyle Busch	Joe Gibbs Racing	Toyota	9
3	12	Ryan Blaney	Team Penske	Ford	8
4	1	Kurt Busch	Chip Ganassi Racing	Chevrolet	7
5	11	Denny Hamlin	Joe Gibbs Racing	Toyota	6
6	48	Alex Bowman	Hendrick Motorsports	Chevrolet	5
7	19	Martin Truex Jr.	Joe Gibbs Racing	Toyota	4
8	9	Chase Elliott	Hendrick Motorsports	Chevrolet	3
9	17	Chris Buescher	Roush Fenway Racing	Ford	2
10	24	William Byron	Hendrick Motorsports	Chevrolet	1
Official stage one results

Stage Two Laps: 105

Pos	No	Driver	Team	Manufacturer	Points
1	5	Kyle Larson	Hendrick Motorsports	Chevrolet	10
2	12	Ryan Blaney	Team Penske	Ford	9
3	48	Alex Bowman	Hendrick Motorsports	Chevrolet	8
4	18	Kyle Busch	Joe Gibbs Racing	Toyota	7
5	24	William Byron	Hendrick Motorsports	Chevrolet	6
6	21	Matt DiBenedetto	Wood Brothers Racing	Ford	5
7	3	Austin Dillon	Richard Childress Racing	Chevrolet	4
8	17	Chris Buescher	Roush Fenway Racing	Ford	3
9	11	Denny Hamlin	Joe Gibbs Racing	Toyota	2
10	99	Daniel Suárez	Trackhouse Racing Team	Chevrolet	1
Official stage two results

=== Final Stage Results ===
Stage Three Laps: 115

Pos	Grid	No	Driver	Team	Manufacturer	Laps	Points
1	10	12	Ryan Blaney	Team Penske	Ford	325	57
2	6	5	Kyle Larson	Hendrick Motorsports	Chevrolet	325	55
3	14	48	Alex Bowman	Hendrick Motorsports	Chevrolet	325	47
4	1	11	Denny Hamlin	Joe Gibbs Racing	Toyota	325	41
5	19	18	Kyle Busch	Joe Gibbs Racing	Toyota	325	48
6	13	3	Austin Dillon	Richard Childress Racing	Chevrolet	325	35
7	17	17	Chris Buescher	Roush Fenway Racing	Ford	325	35
8	9	24	William Byron	Hendrick Motorsports	Chevrolet	325	36
9	2	19	Martin Truex Jr.	Joe Gibbs Racing	Toyota	325	32
10	7	4	Kevin Harvick	Stewart-Haas Racing	Ford	325	27
11	20	21	Matt DiBenedetto	Wood Brothers Racing	Ford	325	31
12	12	47	Ricky Stenhouse Jr.	JTG Daugherty Racing	Chevrolet	325	25
13	28	6	Ryan Newman	Roush Fenway Racing	Ford	325	24
14	21	42	Ross Chastain	Chip Ganassi Racing	Chevrolet	325	23
15	3	22	Joey Logano	Team Penske	Ford	324	22
16	15	23	Bubba Wallace	23XI Racing	Toyota	324	21
17	25	99	Daniel Suárez	Trackhouse Racing Team	Chevrolet	324	21
18	27	41	Cole Custer	Stewart-Haas Racing	Ford	324	19
19	18	34	Michael McDowell	Front Row Motorsports	Ford	324	18
20	16	10	Aric Almirola	Stewart-Haas Racing	Ford	324	17
21	8	20	Christopher Bell	Joe Gibbs Racing	Toyota	323	16
22	39	33	Austin Cindric (i)	Team Penske	Ford	323	0
23	24	14	Chase Briscoe (R)	Stewart-Haas Racing	Ford	323	14
24	22	43	Erik Jones	Richard Petty Motorsports	Chevrolet	323	13
25	23	37	Ryan Preece	JTG Daugherty Racing	Chevrolet	323	12
26	29	8	Tyler Reddick	Richard Childress Racing	Chevrolet	323	11
27	32	38	Anthony Alfredo (R)	Front Row Motorsports	Ford	322	10
28	4	2	Brad Keselowski	Team Penske	Ford	321	9
29	30	7	Corey LaJoie	Spire Motorsports	Chevrolet	319	8
30	26	77	Justin Haley (i)	Spire Motorsports	Chevrolet	319	0
31	33	51	Cody Ware (i)	Petty Ware Racing	Chevrolet	316	0
32	34	15	James Davison	Rick Ware Racing	Chevrolet	316	5
33	35	00	Quin Houff	StarCom Racing	Chevrolet	314	4
34	31	78	B. J. McLeod (i)	Live Fast Motorsports	Ford	313	0
35	36	53	Joey Gase	Rick Ware Racing	Chevrolet	308	2
36	38	66	Timmy Hill (i)	MBM Motorsports	Ford	305	0
37	37	52	Josh Bilicki	Rick Ware Racing	Ford	285	1
38	5	9	Chase Elliott	Hendrick Motorsports	Chevrolet	220	4
39	11	1	Kurt Busch	Chip Ganassi Racing	Chevrolet	113	8
Official race results

=== Race statistics ===
- Lead changes: 11 among 6 different drivers
- Cautions/Laps: 5 for 25
- Red flags: 0
- Time of race: 3 hours, 27 minutes and 41 seconds
- Average speed: 144.595 miles per hour (232.703 km/h)

== Media ==
=== Television ===
The Folds of Honor QuikTrip 500 was carried by Fox in the United States. Mike Joy, five-time Atlanta winner Jeff Gordon and Clint Bowyer called the race from the broadcast booth. Jamie Little and Regan Smith handled pit road for the television side. Larry McReynolds provided insight from the Fox Sports studio in Charlotte.

Fox
Booth announcers	Pit reporters	In-race analyst
Lap-by-lap: Mike Joy; Color-commentator: Jeff Gordon; Color-commentator: Clint Bowyer	Jamie Little; Regan Smith	Larry McReynolds

=== Radio ===
The race was broadcast on radio by the Performance Racing Network and simulcast on Sirius XM NASCAR Radio. Doug Rice and Mark Garrow called the race from the booth when the field raced down the front stretch. Rob Albright called the race from atop a billboard outside of turn 2 when the field raced through turns 1 and 2 & Pat Patterson called the race from a billboard outside of turn 3 when the field raced through turns 3 and 4. On pit road, PRN was manned by Brad Gillie, Doug Turnbull and Wendy Venturini.

PRN
Booth announcers	Turn announcers	Pit reporters
Lead announcer: Doug Rice; Announcer: Mark Garrow	Turns 1 & 2: Rob Albright; Turns 3 & 4: Pat Patterson	Brad Gillie; Doug Turnbull; Wendy Venturini

== Standings after the race ==
Drivers' Championship standings

	Pos	Driver	Points
	1	Denny Hamlin	277
3	2	Kyle Larson	234 (–43)
	3	Joey Logano	214 (–63)
	4	Martin Truex Jr.	212 (–65)
3	5	Brad Keselowski	206 (–71)
1	6	Kevin Harvick	203 (–74)
6	7	Ryan Blaney	191 (–86)
1	8	William Byron	188 (–89)
1	9	Christopher Bell	183 (–94)
4	10	Chase Elliott	183 (–94)
1	11	Austin Dillon	170 (–107)
3	12	Kyle Busch	163 (–114)
2	13	Michael McDowell	158 (–119)
3	14	Alex Bowman	157 (–120)
5	15	Kurt Busch	152 (–125)
2	16	Chris Buescher	144 (–133)
Official driver's standings

Manufacturers' Championship standings

	Pos	Manufacturer	Points
2	1	Ford	217
1	2	Chevrolet	215 (–2)
1	3	Toyota	213 (–4)

- Note: Only the first 16 positions are included for the driver standings.

Previous race: 2021 Instacart 500	NASCAR Cup Series; 2021 season	Next race: 2021 Food City Dirt Race
