= 2021 Instacart 500 =

NASCAR Cup Series race

Race details
- Race 5 of 36 in the 2021 NASCAR Cup Series
- Date: March 14, 2021
- Location: Phoenix Raceway in Avondale, Arizona
- Course: Permanent racing facility
- Course length: 1.022 miles (1.645 km)
- Distance: 312 laps, 318.864 mi (513.162 km)
- Average speed: 103.808 miles per hour (167.063 km/h)

Pole position
Driver	Brad Keselowski	Team Penske
- Grid positions set by competition-based formula

Most laps led
Driver	Joey Logano	Team Penske
- Laps: 143

Winner
No. 19	Martin Truex Jr.	Joe Gibbs Racing

Television in the United States
- Network: Fox
- Nielsen ratings: 3.857 million

Radio in the United States
- Radio: MRN
- Booth announcers: Alex Hayden and Jeff Striegle
- Turn announcers: Dan Hubbard (1 & 2) and Kyle Rickey (3 & 4)

The 2021 Instacart 500 was a NASCAR Cup Series race held on March 14, 2021, at Phoenix Raceway in Avondale, Arizona. Contested over 312 laps on the 1.022 mi (1.645 km) oval, it was the fifth race of the 2021 NASCAR Cup Series season.

== Report ==
=== Background ===
2021 Instacart 500 program cover

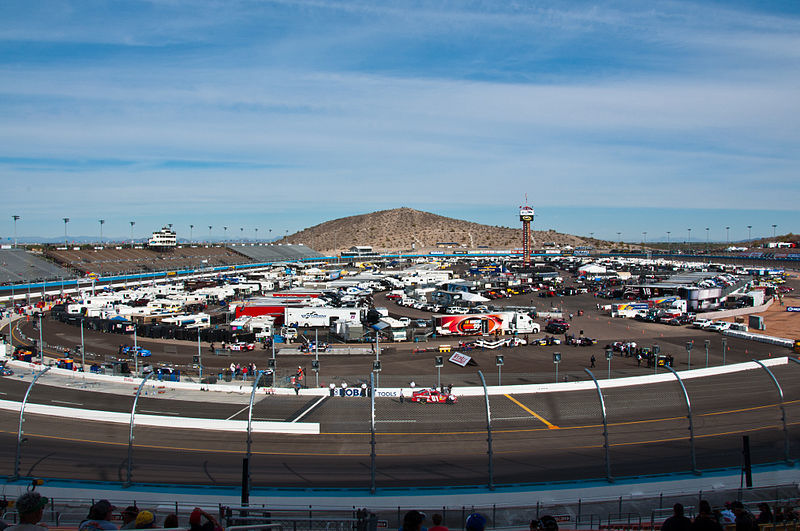
Phoenix Raceway was the site of the fifth race of the season

Phoenix Raceway, is a 1.022 mi (1.645 km), low-banked tri-oval race track located in Avondale, Arizona. The motorsport track opened in 1964 and currently hosts two NASCAR race weekends annually. PIR has also hosted the IndyCar Series, CART, USAC and the Rolex Sports Car Series. The raceway is currently owned and operated by International Speedway Corporation.

==== Entry list ====
- (R) denotes rookie driver.
- (i) denotes driver who are ineligible for series driver points.

No.	Driver	Team	Manufacturer
00	Quin Houff	StarCom Racing	Chevrolet
1	Kurt Busch	Chip Ganassi Racing	Chevrolet
2	Brad Keselowski	Team Penske	Ford
3	Austin Dillon	Richard Childress Racing	Chevrolet
4	Kevin Harvick	Stewart-Haas Racing	Ford
5	Kyle Larson	Hendrick Motorsports	Chevrolet
6	Ryan Newman	Roush Fenway Racing	Ford
7	Corey LaJoie	Spire Motorsports	Chevrolet
8	Tyler Reddick	Richard Childress Racing	Chevrolet
9	Chase Elliott	Hendrick Motorsports	Chevrolet
10	Aric Almirola	Stewart-Haas Racing	Ford
11	Denny Hamlin	Joe Gibbs Racing	Toyota
12	Ryan Blaney	Team Penske	Ford
14	Chase Briscoe (R)	Stewart-Haas Racing	Ford
15	James Davison	Rick Ware Racing	Chevrolet
17	Chris Buescher	Roush Fenway Racing	Ford
18	Kyle Busch	Joe Gibbs Racing	Toyota
19	Martin Truex Jr.	Joe Gibbs Racing	Toyota
20	Christopher Bell	Joe Gibbs Racing	Toyota
21	Matt DiBenedetto	Wood Brothers Racing	Ford
22	Joey Logano	Team Penske	Ford
23	Bubba Wallace	23XI Racing	Toyota
24	William Byron	Hendrick Motorsports	Chevrolet
34	Michael McDowell	Front Row Motorsports	Ford
37	Ryan Preece	JTG Daugherty Racing	Chevrolet
38	Anthony Alfredo (R)	Front Row Motorsports	Ford
41	Cole Custer	Stewart-Haas Racing	Ford
42	Ross Chastain	Chip Ganassi Racing	Chevrolet
43	Erik Jones	Richard Petty Motorsports	Chevrolet
47	Ricky Stenhouse Jr.	JTG Daugherty Racing	Chevrolet
48	Alex Bowman	Hendrick Motorsports	Chevrolet
51	Cody Ware (i)	Petty Ware Racing	Chevrolet
52	Josh Bilicki	Rick Ware Racing	Ford
53	Garrett Smithley (i)	Rick Ware Racing	Chevrolet
66	Timmy Hill (i)	MBM Motorsports	Toyota
77	Justin Haley (i)	Spire Motorsports	Chevrolet
78	B. J. McLeod (i)	Live Fast Motorsports	Ford
99	Daniel Suárez	Trackhouse Racing Team	Chevrolet
Official entry list

== Qualifying ==
Brad Keselowski was awarded the pole for the race as determined by competition-based formula.

=== Starting Lineup ===
Pos	No.	Driver	Team	Manufacturer
1	2	Brad Keselowski	Team Penske	Ford
2	5	Kyle Larson	Hendrick Motorsports	Chevrolet
3	11	Denny Hamlin	Joe Gibbs Racing	Toyota
4	20	Christopher Bell	Joe Gibbs Racing	Toyota
5	19	Martin Truex Jr.	Joe Gibbs Racing	Toyota
6	9	Chase Elliott	Hendrick Motorsports	Chevrolet
7	18	Kyle Busch	Joe Gibbs Racing	Toyota
8	12	Ryan Blaney	Team Penske	Ford
9	22	Joey Logano	Team Penske	Ford
10	24	William Byron	Hendrick Motorsports	Chevrolet
11	47	Ricky Stenhouse Jr.	JTG Daugherty Racing	Chevrolet
12	1	Kurt Busch	Chip Ganassi Racing	Chevrolet
13	3	Austin Dillon	Richard Childress Racing	Chevrolet
14	43	Erik Jones	Richard Petty Motorsports	Chevrolet
15	37	Ryan Preece	JTG Daugherty Racing	Chevrolet
16	34	Michael McDowell	Front Row Motorsports	Ford
17	17	Chris Buescher	Roush Fenway Racing	Ford
18	4	Kevin Harvick	Stewart-Haas Racing	Ford
19	6	Ryan Newman	Roush Fenway Racing	Ford
20	21	Matt DiBenedetto	Wood Brothers Racing	Ford
21	48	Alex Bowman	Hendrick Motorsports	Chevrolet
22	42	Ross Chastain	Chip Ganassi Racing	Chevrolet
23	8	Tyler Reddick	Richard Childress Racing	Chevrolet
24	41	Cole Custer	Stewart-Haas Racing	Ford
25	23	Bubba Wallace	23XI Racing	Toyota
26	14	Chase Briscoe (R)	Stewart-Haas Racing	Ford
27	99	Daniel Suárez	Trackhouse Racing Team	Chevrolet
28	38	Anthony Alfredo (R)	Front Row Motorsports	Ford
29	77	Justin Haley (i)	Spire Motorsports	Chevrolet
30	78	B. J. McLeod (i)	Live Fast Motorsports	Ford
31	51	Cody Ware (i)	Petty Ware Racing	Chevrolet
32	10	Aric Almirola	Stewart-Haas Racing	Ford
33	7	Corey LaJoie	Spire Motorsports	Chevrolet
34	53	Garrett Smithley (i)	Rick Ware Racing	Chevrolet
35	00	Quin Houff	StarCom Racing	Chevrolet
36	52	Josh Bilicki	Rick Ware Racing	Ford
37	66	Timmy Hill (i)	MBM Motorsports	Toyota
38	15	James Davison	Rick Ware Racing	Chevrolet
Official starting lineup

== Race ==
Martin Truex Jr. won the race, driving a Toyota. It was his first Cup Series win since the race at Martinsville Speedway in June 2020. He finished 1.698 seconds ahead of Ford driver Joey Logano. It was Truex's 28th Cup Series win and his first at Phoenix.

=== Stage Results ===
Stage One Laps: 75

Pos	No	Driver	Team	Manufacturer	Points
1	12	Ryan Blaney	Team Penske	Ford	10
2	22	Joey Logano	Team Penske	Ford	9
3	2	Brad Keselowski	Team Penske	Ford	8
4	11	Denny Hamlin	Joe Gibbs Racing	Toyota	7
5	9	Chase Elliott	Hendrick Motorsports	Chevrolet	6
6	18	Kyle Busch	Joe Gibbs Racing	Toyota	5
7	4	Kevin Harvick	Stewart-Haas Racing	Ford	4
8	24	William Byron	Hendrick Motorsports	Chevrolet	3
9	5	Kyle Larson	Hendrick Motorsports	Chevrolet	2
10	21	Matt DiBenedetto	Wood Brothers Racing	Ford	1
Official stage one results

Stage Two Laps: 115

Pos	No	Driver	Team	Manufacturer	Points
1	22	Joey Logano	Team Penske	Ford	10
2	19	Martin Truex Jr.	Joe Gibbs Racing	Toyota	9
3	11	Denny Hamlin	Joe Gibbs Racing	Toyota	8
4	2	Brad Keselowski	Team Penske	Ford	7
5	12	Ryan Blaney	Team Penske	Ford	6
6	4	Kevin Harvick	Stewart-Haas Racing	Ford	5
7	24	William Byron	Hendrick Motorsports	Chevrolet	4
8	10	Aric Almirola	Stewart-Haas Racing	Ford	3
9	9	Chase Elliott	Hendrick Motorsports	Chevrolet	2
10	20	Christopher Bell	Joe Gibbs Racing	Toyota	1
Official stage two results

=== Final Stage Results ===
Stage Three Laps: 122

Pos	Grid	No	Driver	Team	Manufacturer	Laps	Points
1	5	19	Martin Truex Jr.	Joe Gibbs Racing	Toyota	312	49
2	9	22	Joey Logano	Team Penske	Ford	312	54
3	3	11	Denny Hamlin	Joe Gibbs Racing	Toyota	312	49
4	1	2	Brad Keselowski	Team Penske	Ford	312	48
5	6	9	Chase Elliott	Hendrick Motorsports	Chevrolet	312	40
6	18	4	Kevin Harvick	Stewart-Haas Racing	Ford	312	40
7	2	5	Kyle Larson	Hendrick Motorsports	Chevrolet	312	32
8	10	24	William Byron	Hendrick Motorsports	Chevrolet	312	36
9	4	20	Christopher Bell	Joe Gibbs Racing	Toyota	312	29
10	8	12	Ryan Blaney	Team Penske	Ford	312	43
11	32	10	Aric Almirola	Stewart-Haas Racing	Ford	312	29
12	11	47	Ricky Stenhouse Jr.	JTG Daugherty Racing	Chevrolet	312	25
13	21	48	Alex Bowman	Hendrick Motorsports	Chevrolet	312	24
14	20	21	Matt DiBenedetto	Wood Brothers Racing	Ford	312	24
15	12	1	Kurt Busch	Chip Ganassi Racing	Chevrolet	312	22
16	25	23	Bubba Wallace	23XI Racing	Toyota	312	21
17	13	3	Austin Dillon	Richard Childress Racing	Chevrolet	312	20
18	17	17	Chris Buescher	Roush Fenway Racing	Ford	312	19
19	22	42	Ross Chastain	Chip Ganassi Racing	Chevrolet	312	18
20	14	43	Erik Jones	Richard Petty Motorsports	Chevrolet	312	17
21	27	99	Daniel Suárez	Trackhouse Racing Team	Chevrolet	312	16
22	26	14	Chase Briscoe (R)	Stewart-Haas Racing	Ford	312	15
23	16	34	Michael McDowell	Front Row Motorsports	Ford	312	14
24	29	77	Justin Haley (i)	Spire Motorsports	Chevrolet	312	0
25	7	18	Kyle Busch	Joe Gibbs Racing	Toyota	311	17
26	15	37	Ryan Preece	JTG Daugherty Racing	Chevrolet	311	11
27	33	7	Corey LaJoie	Spire Motorsports	Chevrolet	311	10
28	19	6	Ryan Newman	Roush Fenway Racing	Ford	311	9
29	23	8	Tyler Reddick	Richard Childress Racing	Chevrolet	310	8
30	30	78	B. J. McLeod (i)	Live Fast Motorsports	Ford	309	0
31	24	41	Cole Custer	Stewart-Haas Racing	Ford	308	6
32	35	00	Quin Houff	StarCom Racing	Chevrolet	305	5
33	38	15	James Davison	Rick Ware Racing	Chevrolet	303	4
34	34	53	Garrett Smithley (i)	Rick Ware Racing	Chevrolet	300	0
35	36	52	Josh Bilicki	Rick Ware Racing	Ford	258	2
36	31	51	Cody Ware (i)	Petty Ware Racing	Chevrolet	101	0
37	28	38	Anthony Alfredo (R)	Front Row Motorsports	Ford	87	1
38	37	66	Timmy Hill (i)	MBM Motorsports	Toyota	15	0
Official race results

=== Race statistics ===
- Lead changes: 22 among 9 different drivers
- Cautions/Laps: 7 for 45
- Red flags: 0
- Time of race: 3 hours, 0 minutes and 20 seconds
- Average speed: 103.808 miles per hour (167.063 km/h)

== Media ==
=== Television ===
Fox Sports covered their 16th race at the Phoenix Raceway. Mike Joy, two-time Phoenix winner Jeff Gordon and Clint Bowyer called the race from the broadcast booth. Jamie Little and Regan Smith handled pit road for the television side. Larry McReynolds provided insight from the Fox Sports studio in Charlotte.

Fox
Booth announcers	Pit reporters	In-race analyst
Lap-by-lap: Mike Joy; Color-commentator: Jeff Gordon; Color-commentator: Clint Bowyer	Jamie Little; Regan Smith	Larry McReynolds

=== Radio ===
MRN covered the radio action for the race which was also simulcasted on Sirius XM NASCAR Radio. Alex Hayden and Jeff Striegle called the race when the field raced past the start/finish line. Dan Hubbard called the action from turns 1 & 2 and Kyle Rickey called the action from turns 3 & 4. Pit lane was manned by Steve Post and Dillon Welch.

MRN
Booth announcers	Turn announcers	Pit reporters
Lead announcer: Alex Hayden; Announcer: Jeff Striegle	Turns 1 & 2: Dan Hubbard; Turns 3 & 4: Kyle Rickey	Steve Post; Dillon Welch

== Standings after the race ==
Drivers' Championship standings

	Pos	Driver	Points
	1	Denny Hamlin	235
	2	Brad Keselowski	197 (–38)
3	3	Joey Logano	192 (–43)
4	4	Martin Truex Jr.	180 (–55)
2	5	Kyle Larson	179 (–56)
2	6	Chase Elliott	179 (–56)
	7	Kevin Harvick	176 (–59)
3	8	Christopher Bell	167 (–68)
2	9	William Byron	152 (–83)
	10	Kurt Busch	144 (–91)
2	11	Michael McDowell	140 (–95)
	12	Austin Dillon	135 (–100)
2	13	Ryan Blaney	134 (–101)
1	14	Ryan Preece	123 (–112)
1	15	Kyle Busch	115 (–120)
1	16	Ricky Stenhouse Jr.	113 (–123)
Official driver's standings

Manufacturers' Championship standings

	Pos	Manufacturer	Points
	1	Chevrolet	180
1	2	Toyota	180 (–0)
1	3	Ford	177 (–3)

- Note: Only the first 16 positions are included for the driver standings.

Previous race: 2021 Pennzoil 400	NASCAR Cup Series; 2021 season	Next race: 2021 Folds of Honor QuikTrip 500
