= Jonathan Davenport =

American racing driver

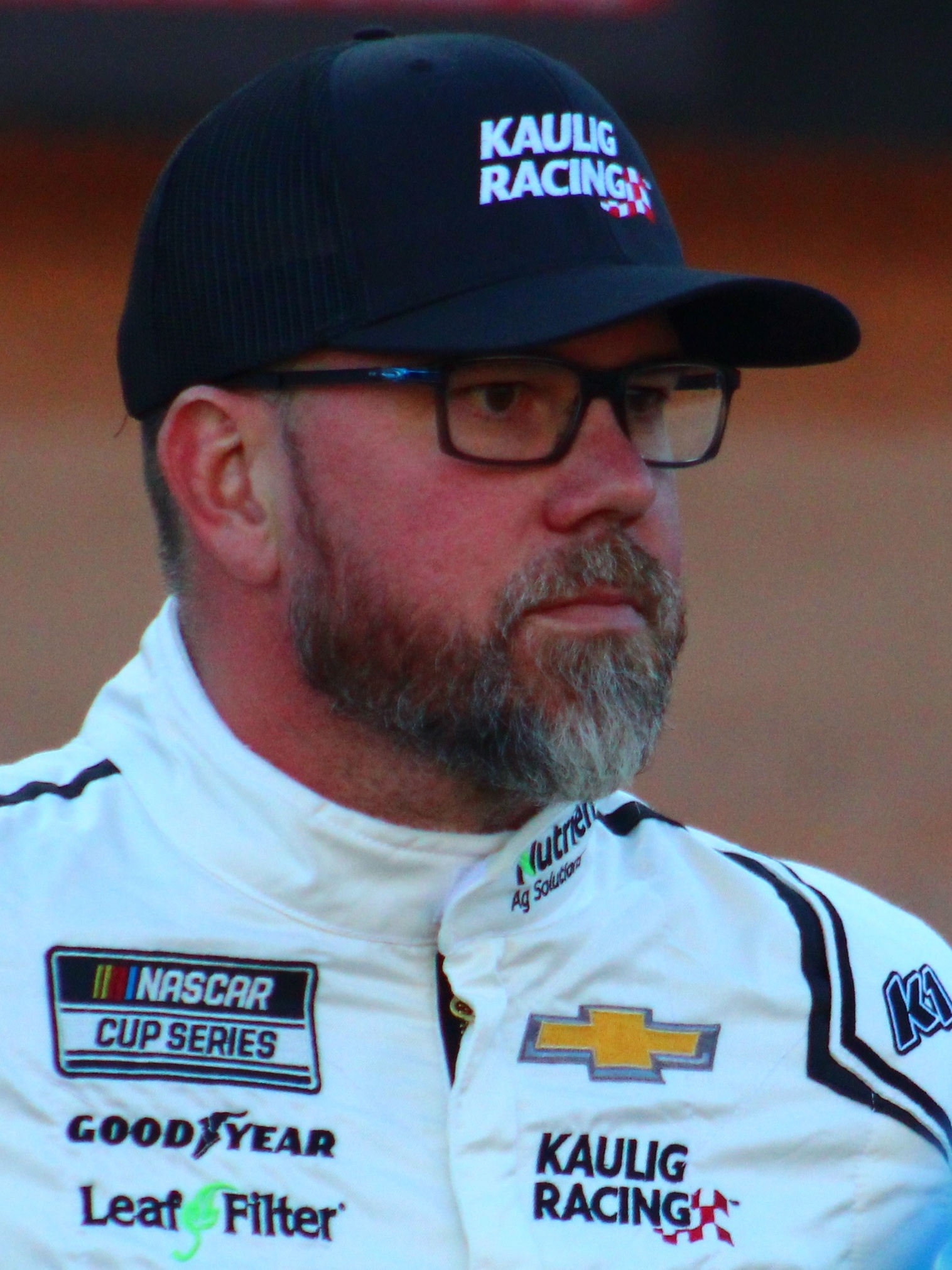
- Davenport at Bristol Motor Speedway in 2023
- Born: Jonathan Lee Davenport; October 31, 1983 (age 43) Blairsville, Georgia, U.S.

Late model career
- Debut season: 2002
- Current team: Double L Motorsports
- Car number: No. 49
- Wins: 264

Previous series
- 1996-2002 Wins 1994-1996 Wins 1991-1994 Wins: Legend cars 104; Mini-stocks; 30; Kart racing 50+

Championship titles
- 2023, 2021, 2016 Wild West Shootout Champion; 2022 XR Super Series Champion; 2019, 2018, 2015 Lucas Oil Late Model Dirt Series National Champion; 2013, 2010 Ray Cook's Southern National Series Champion; 2000, 1999 Legend Cars Semi-Pro National Champion

Awards
- 2012 Lucas Oil Late Model Dirt Series Rookie of the Year; 2023 Lucas Oil Late Model Dirt Series Most Popular Driver
- Achievements: 2001 Legends World Finals; 2004 Topless 40; 2009, 2011, 2014, 2019 March Madness; 2009, 2011, 2014 National 100; 2010, 2014 Patriot Nationals; 2011 Blue-Gray 100; 2014, 2018 King of the Commonwealth; 2015, 2023, 2024, 2025 Dirt Late Model Dream; 2015 Prairie Dirt Classic; 2015, 2017, 2019, 2020, 2021-B, 2022 World 100; 2015 Show-Me 100; 2015, 2022 North-South 100; 2015, 2021, 2022 USA Nationals; 2015 Jackson 100; 2016 Scorcher; 2016, 2018, 2022 Silver Dollar Nationals; 2017 Hillbilly 100; 2020, 2021 John Bradshaw Memorial; 2021 Bad Boy 98; 2022 Eldora Million; 2022 Late Model Knoxville Nationals

NASCAR Cup Series career
- 1 race run over 1 year
- 2023 position: 41st
- Best finish: 41st (2023)
- First race: 2023 Food City Dirt Race (Bristol Dirt)
Wins	Top tens	Poles
0	0	0

NASCAR FedEx Freight Truck Series career
- 1 race run over 1 year
- 2023 position: 103rd
- Best finish: 86th (2013)
- First race: 2023 Weather Guard Truck Race on Dirt (Bristol Dirt)
Wins	Top tens	Poles
0	0	0
- Statistics up to date as of November 26, 2025.

Jonathan Lee Davenport (born October 31, 1983), nicknamed Superman, is an American professional dirt track and stock car racing driver. He currently competes full-time in the Lucas Oil Late Model Dirt Series, driving the No. 49 Longhorn Chassis for Double L Motorsports. Davenport is a 3-time champion in the Lucas Oil Late Model Dirt Series, having won the title in 2015, 2018, and 2019, and a 5-time champion of the World 100 at Eldora Speedway.

== Racing career ==
=== Early career ===
Davenport began his racing career in go-karts at the age of 7, where he won his first ever race. At 10 years old he started racing Mini-stocks and by 1996 was racing asphalt Legend Cars and by 2002 asphalt Pro Late Models. Davenport made his dirt Late Model debut in 2004.

=== Dirt Late Models ===
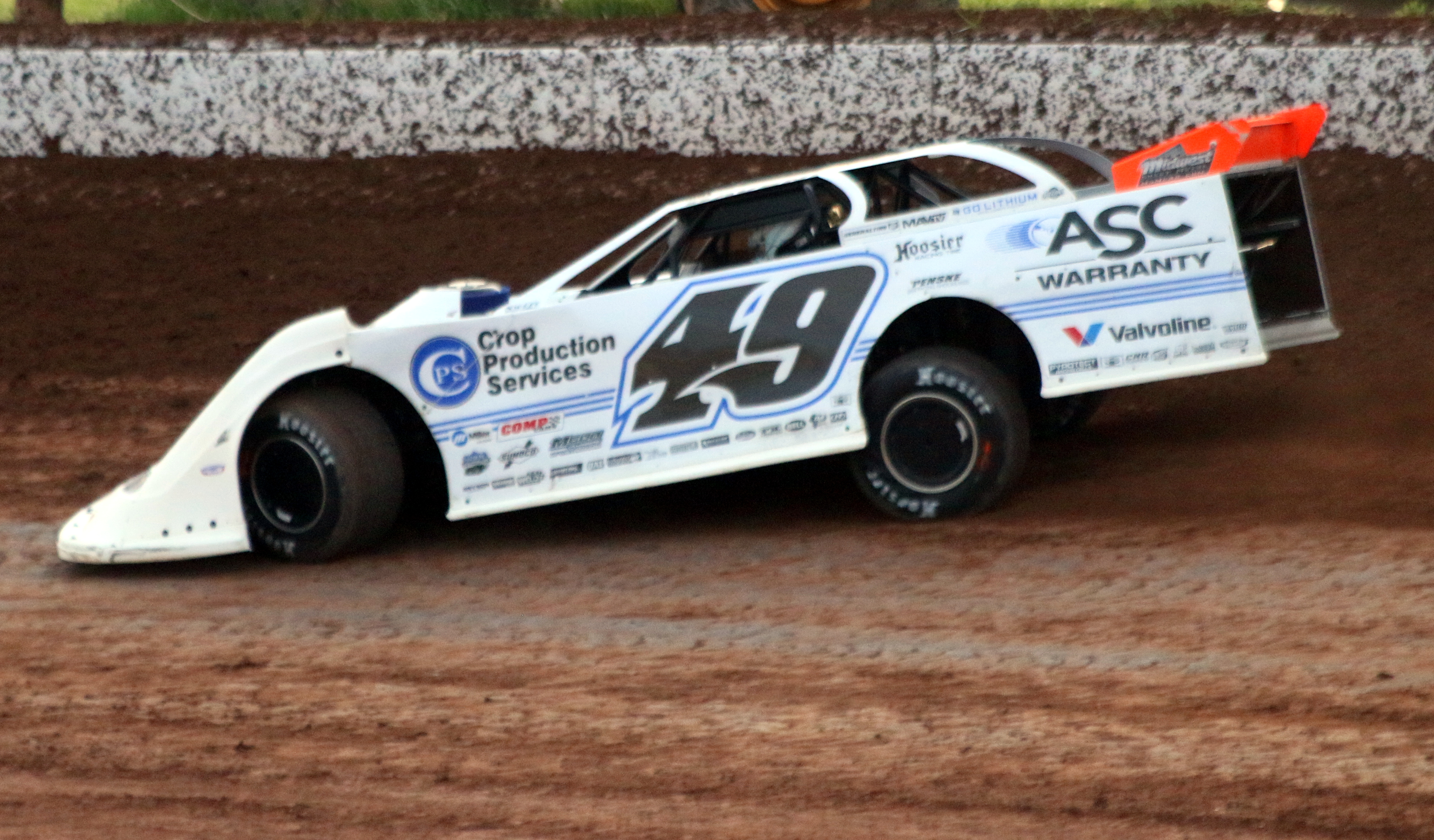
Davenport in 2018.

In 2005 Davenport competed in Super Late Models at Sugar Creek Raceway in Blue Ridge Ga, before eventually branching out into regional and national series, winning Rookie of the Year in the Lucas Oil Series in 2012, and the championship in 2015, 2018, and 2019. He has earned 75 wins, 191 top fives, and over 282 top tens, making him one of the most successful drivers in the series.

Davenport has also competed in the World of Outlaws Late Model Series, but mostly runs part-time to focus on running in other late model events. His best result was a sixteenth-place points finish in 2011, despite running eleven out of the 34 races, along with fifteen wins, 48 top fives, and 70 top tens.

Davenport has also competed in the World 100, which is the most prestigious dirt late model race in the United States. He would win the Eldora globe trophy five times: 2015, 2017, 2019, 2021, and 2022.

=== NASCAR Craftsman Truck Series ===
==== 2013 ====
In 2013, Davenport attempted to make his NASCAR Camping World Truck Series debut at the Martinsville Speedway spring race, driving the No. 1 for MAKE Motorsports, but would fail to qualify.

==== 2023 ====
On April 3, 2023, Spire Motorsports announced that Davenport will make his official debut in the NASCAR Craftsman Truck Series in the Weather Guard Truck Race on Dirt, along with running the Cup Series race for Kaulig Racing.

=== NASCAR Cup Series ===
==== 2023 ====
On March 9, 2023, Kaulig Racing announced that Davenport would make his NASCAR Cup Series debut at the Bristol dirt race, driving the No. 13 car. Davenport finished 36th after being involved in a multi-car crash midway through the race.

== Motorsports career results ==
=== NASCAR ===
(key) (Bold – Pole position awarded by qualifying time. Italics – Pole position earned by points standings or practice time. * – Most laps led.)

==== Cup Series ====
NASCAR Cup Series results
Year	Team	No.	Make	1	2	3	4	5	6	7	8	9	10	11	12	13	14	15	16	17	18	19	20	21	22	23	24	25	26	27	28	29	30	31	32	33	34	35	36	NCSC	Pts	Ref
2023	Kaulig Racing	13	Chevy	DAY	CAL	LVS	PHO	ATL	COA	RCH	BRD; 36	MAR	TAL	DOV	KAN	DAR	CLT	GTW	SON	NSH	CSC	ATL	NHA	POC	RCH	MCH	IRC	GLN	DAY	DAR	KAN	BRI	TEX	TAL	ROV	LVS	HOM	MAR	PHO	41st	1	

==== Craftsman Truck Series ====
NASCAR Craftsman Truck Series results
Year	Team	No.	Make	1	2	3	4	5	6	7	8	9	10	11	12	13	14	15	16	17	18	19	20	21	22	23	NCTC	Pts	Ref
2013	MAKE Motorsports	1	Chevy	DAY	MAR; DNQ	CAR	KAN	CLT	DOV	TEX	KEN	IOW	ELD	POC	MCH	BRI	MSP	IOW	CHI	LVS	TAL	MAR	TEX	PHO	HOM		86th	0	
2023	Spire Motorsports	7	Chevy	DAY	LVS	ATL	COA	TEX	BRD; 14	MAR	KAN	DAR	NWS	CLT	GTW	NSH	MOH	POC	RCH	IRP	MLW	KAN	BRI	TAL	HOM	PHO	103rd	0^{1}	

=== Superstar Racing Experience ===
(key) * – Most laps led. ^{1} – Heat 1 winner. ^{2} – Heat 2 winner.

Superstar Racing Experience results
Year	No.	1	2	3	4	5	6	SRXC	Pts
2023	49	STA	STA II	MMS	BER	ELD	LOS; 1*^{1}	10th	0^{1}

^{*} Season still in progress
^{1} Ineligible for series points

Sporting positions
Preceded by Incumbent	Legend Cars Semi-Pro National Champion; 1999, 2000	Succeeded by Harry Garber
Preceded by Don O'Neal	Lucas Oil Late Model Dirt Series Champion; 2015, 2018, 2019	Succeeded by Scott Bloomquist; Jimmy Owens
Preceded by Inaugural	XR Super Series Champion; 2022	Succeeded by Bobby Pierce
Achievements
Preceded by Dustin Bly	Legends World Finals Winner; 2001	Succeeded by Craig Lewis
Preceded by Austin Dillon; Ryan Atkins	Patriot Nationals Winner; 2010, 2014	Succeeded by Ron Parker; Trent Ivey
Preceded by Scott Bloomquist; Brandon Overton	King of the Commonwealth Winner; 2014, 2018	Succeeded by Randy Weaver; Brandon Overton
Preceded by Dale McDowell	Show-Me 100 Winner; 2015	Succeeded by Dennis Erb Jr.
Preceded by Jimmy Owens; Brandon Overton	USA Nationals Winner; 2015	Succeeded by Josh Richards; Incumbent
Preceded by Don O'Neal	Dirt Late Model Dream Winner; 2015, 2024, 2025	Succeeded by Jimmy Owens (2016); Incumbent
Preceded by Scott Bloomquist (2014); Bobby Pierce (2016); Tim McCreadie (2018); Brandon Overton (2021-a)	World 100 Winner; 2015, 2017, 2019, 2020 IC, 2021-b, 2022	Succeeded by Bobby Pierce (2016); Tim McCreadie (2018); Brandon Overton (2021-a); Hudson O'Neal (2023)
Preceded by Dale McDowell	Scorcher Winner; 2016	Succeeded by Dale McDowell
Preceded by Donnie Moran	Eldora Million Winner; 2022	Succeeded by Incumbent
Preceded by Mike Marlar	Lucas Oil Late Model Knoxville Nationals Winner; 2022	Succeeded by Incumbent
Awards
Preceded by Tyler Reddick	Lucas Oil Late Model Dirt Series Rookie of the Year; 2012	Succeeded by Billy Moyer Jr.
