= 2021 Lucas Oil Late Model Dirt Series =

16th season of American touring series

The 2021 Lucas Oil Late Model Dirt Series is the 16th season of the Lucas Oil Late Model Dirt Series, a national touring series for dirt late models owned & operated by Lucas Oil. The series began with the General Tire Winter Nationals at All-Tech Raceway on January 22, and ended with the Dirt Track World Championship at Portsmouth Raceway Park on October 16. Tim McCreadie won the 2021 drivers' championship. Ricky Thornton Jr. was crowned 2021 Rookie of the Year.

== Teams and drivers ==
=== Complete schedule ===
No.	Race driver	Team
1T	Tyler Erb	Best Performance Motorsports
14	Josh Richards	Clint Bowyer Racing
20	Jimmy Owens	Ramirez Motorsports
20RT	Ricky Thornton Jr.	SSI Motorsports
25	Shane Clanton	Skyline Motorsports
39	Tim McCreadie	Paylor Motorsports
40B	Kyle Bronson	Kyle Bronson Motorsports
49	Jonathan Davenport	Double L Motorsports
71	Hudson O'Neal	Double Down Motorsports
157	Mike Marlar	Mike Marlar Racing

== Schedule and results ==
The 2021 schedule was released on October 14, 2020.

MavTV Plus streamed all 2021 races online.

No.	Date	Race / Track	Winning driver	Heat winner	B-Main winner	Fastest Qualifier
1	Jan 23	General Tire Winter Nationals - All-Tech Raceway, Lake City, Florida	Kyle Larson ($15,000)	Tyler Erb	Jesse Stovall	Tyler Erb
1	Jan 23	General Tire Winter Nationals - All-Tech Raceway, Lake City, Florida	Kyle Larson ($15,000)	Devin Moran	Rick Eckert	Mike Marlar
1	Jan 23	General Tire Winter Nationals - All-Tech Raceway, Lake City, Florida	Kyle Larson ($15,000)	Brian Shirley		
1	Jan 23	General Tire Winter Nationals - All-Tech Raceway, Lake City, Florida	Kyle Larson ($15,000)	Brandon Overton		
1	Jan 23	General Tire Winter Nationals - All-Tech Raceway, Lake City, Florida	Kyle Larson ($15,000)	Kyle Bronson		
1	Jan 23	General Tire Winter Nationals - All-Tech Raceway, Lake City, Florida	Kyle Larson ($15,000)	Kyle Larson		57 cars entered
2	Jan 25	Winternationals - East Bay Raceway Park, Tampa, Florida	Hudson O'Neal ($5,000)	Kyle Bronson	Dennis Erb Jr.	Kyle Bronson
2	Jan 25	Winternationals - East Bay Raceway Park, Tampa, Florida	Hudson O'Neal ($5,000)	Brandon Sheppard	Jimmy Owens	Brandon Overton
2	Jan 25	Winternationals - East Bay Raceway Park, Tampa, Florida	Hudson O'Neal ($5,000)	Tyler Erb		
2	Jan 25	Winternationals - East Bay Raceway Park, Tampa, Florida	Hudson O'Neal ($5,000)	Brandon Overton		
2	Jan 25	Winternationals - East Bay Raceway Park, Tampa, Florida	Hudson O'Neal ($5,000)	Hudson O'Neal		
2	Jan 25	Winternationals - East Bay Raceway Park, Tampa, Florida	Hudson O'Neal ($5,000)	Tanner English		74 cars entered
3	Jan 26	Winternationals - East Bay Raceway Park, Tampa, Florida	Tyler Erb ($5,000)	Tanner English	Mike Marlar	Tanner English
3	Jan 26	Winternationals - East Bay Raceway Park, Tampa, Florida	Tyler Erb ($5,000)	Kyle Bronson	Kyle Strickler	Brian Shirley
3	Jan 26	Winternationals - East Bay Raceway Park, Tampa, Florida	Tyler Erb ($5,000)	Brandon Overton		
3	Jan 26	Winternationals - East Bay Raceway Park, Tampa, Florida	Tyler Erb ($5,000)	Brian Shirley		
3	Jan 26	Winternationals - East Bay Raceway Park, Tampa, Florida	Tyler Erb ($5,000)	Brandon Sheppard		
3	Jan 26	Winternationals - East Bay Raceway Park, Tampa, Florida	Tyler Erb ($5,000)	Shane Clanton		74 cars entered
4	Jan 27	Winternationals - East Bay Raceway Park, Tampa, Florida	Josh Richards ($7,000)	Brandon Sheppard	Tony Jackson Jr.	Brandon Sheppard
4	Jan 27	Winternationals - East Bay Raceway Park, Tampa, Florida	Josh Richards ($7,000)	Bobby Pierce	Billy Moyer Jr.	Mark Whitener
4	Jan 27	Winternationals - East Bay Raceway Park, Tampa, Florida	Josh Richards ($7,000)	Wil Herrington		
4	Jan 27	Winternationals - East Bay Raceway Park, Tampa, Florida	Josh Richards ($7,000)	Mark Whitener		
4	Jan 27	Winternationals - East Bay Raceway Park, Tampa, Florida	Josh Richards ($7,000)	Jimmy Owens		
4	Jan 27	Winternationals - East Bay Raceway Park, Tampa, Florida	Josh Richards ($7,000)	Brandon Overton		72 cars entered
5	Jan 28	Winternationals - East Bay Raceway Park, Tampa, Florida	Stormy Scott ($7,000)	Boom Briggs	Jonathan Davenport	Tim McCreadie
5	Jan 28	Winternationals - East Bay Raceway Park, Tampa, Florida	Stormy Scott ($7,000)	Brian Shirley	Ashton Winger	Bobby Pierce
5	Jan 28	Winternationals - East Bay Raceway Park, Tampa, Florida	Stormy Scott ($7,000)	Kyle Bronson		
5	Jan 28	Winternationals - East Bay Raceway Park, Tampa, Florida	Stormy Scott ($7,000)	Bobby Pierce		
5	Jan 28	Winternationals - East Bay Raceway Park, Tampa, Florida	Stormy Scott ($7,000)	Mason Zeigler		
5	Jan 28	Winternationals - East Bay Raceway Park, Tampa, Florida	Stormy Scott ($7,000)	Tyler Erb		78 cars entered
6	Jan 29	Winternationals - East Bay Raceway Park, Tampa, Florida	Brandon Overton ($12,000)	Brian Shirley	Jonathan Davenport	Brian Shirley
6	Jan 29	Winternationals - East Bay Raceway Park, Tampa, Florida	Brandon Overton ($12,000)	Boom Briggs	Hudson O'Neal	Brandon Overton
6	Jan 29	Winternationals - East Bay Raceway Park, Tampa, Florida	Brandon Overton ($12,000)	Shane Clanton		
6	Jan 29	Winternationals - East Bay Raceway Park, Tampa, Florida	Brandon Overton ($12,000)	Brandon Overton		
6	Jan 29	Winternationals - East Bay Raceway Park, Tampa, Florida	Brandon Overton ($12,000)	Jimmy Owens		
6	Jan 29	Winternationals - East Bay Raceway Park, Tampa, Florida	Brandon Overton ($12,000)	Bobby Pierce		77 cars entered
7	Jan 30	Winternationals - East Bay Raceway Park, Tampa, Florida	Tyler Erb ($15,000)	Kyle Bronson	Brandon Overton	Brandon Overton
7	Jan 30	Winternationals - East Bay Raceway Park, Tampa, Florida	Tyler Erb ($15,000)	Tim McCreadie	Gregg Saterlee	Brandon Sheppard
7	Jan 30	Winternationals - East Bay Raceway Park, Tampa, Florida	Tyler Erb ($15,000)	Mark Whitener		
7	Jan 30	Winternationals - East Bay Raceway Park, Tampa, Florida	Tyler Erb ($15,000)	Brandon Sheppard		
7	Jan 30	Winternationals - East Bay Raceway Park, Tampa, Florida	Tyler Erb ($15,000)	Tyler Erb		
7	Jan 30	Winternationals - East Bay Raceway Park, Tampa, Florida	Tyler Erb ($15,000)	Jonathan Davenport		71 cars entered
8	Feb 1	K&N Filters Winter Nationals - Bubba Raceway Park, Ocala, Florida	Ricky Thornton Jr. ($10,000)	Brian Shirley	Tyler Erb	Brian Shirley
8	Feb 1	K&N Filters Winter Nationals - Bubba Raceway Park, Ocala, Florida	Ricky Thornton Jr. ($10,000)	Mike Marlar	Rick Eckert	Kyle Bronson
8	Feb 1	K&N Filters Winter Nationals - Bubba Raceway Park, Ocala, Florida	Ricky Thornton Jr. ($10,000)	Kyle Bronson		
8	Feb 1	K&N Filters Winter Nationals - Bubba Raceway Park, Ocala, Florida	Ricky Thornton Jr. ($10,000)	Jonathan Davenport		49 cars entered
9	Feb 2	K&N Filters Winter Nationals - Bubba Raceway Park, Ocala, Florida	Shane Clanton ($10,000)	Jimmy Owens	Jonathan Davenport	Jimmy Owens
9	Feb 2	K&N Filters Winter Nationals - Bubba Raceway Park, Ocala, Florida	Shane Clanton ($10,000)	Bobby Pierce	Rick Eckert	Shane Clanton
9	Feb 2	K&N Filters Winter Nationals - Bubba Raceway Park, Ocala, Florida	Shane Clanton ($10,000)	Shane Clanton		
9	Feb 2	K&N Filters Winter Nationals - Bubba Raceway Park, Ocala, Florida	Shane Clanton ($10,000)	Stewart Friesen		46 cars entered
10	Mar 21	Buckeye Spring 50 - Atomic Speedway, Waverly, Ohio	Hudson O'Neal ($12,000)	Kyle Stricker		Jonathan Davenport
10	Mar 21	Buckeye Spring 50 - Atomic Speedway, Waverly, Ohio	Hudson O'Neal ($12,000)	Hudson O'Neal		Devin Moran
10	Mar 21	Buckeye Spring 50 - Atomic Speedway, Waverly, Ohio	Hudson O'Neal ($12,000)	Devin Moran		
10	Mar 21	Buckeye Spring 50 - Atomic Speedway, Waverly, Ohio	Hudson O'Neal ($12,000)	Earl Pearson Jr.		29 cars entered
11	Apr 17	Nininger Tribute - Hagerstown Speedway, Hagerstown, Maryland	Tim McCreadie ($15,000)	Dylan Yoder	Stormy Scott	Kyle Larson
11	Apr 17	Nininger Tribute - Hagerstown Speedway, Hagerstown, Maryland	Tim McCreadie ($15,000)	Gregg Saterlee	Devin Moran	Shane Clanton
11	Apr 17	Nininger Tribute - Hagerstown Speedway, Hagerstown, Maryland	Tim McCreadie ($15,000)	Ricky Thornton Jr.		
11	Apr 17	Nininger Tribute - Hagerstown Speedway, Hagerstown, Maryland	Tim McCreadie ($15,000)	Tim McCreadie		42 cars entered
12	Apr 18	River Valley 40 - Port Royal Speedway, Port Royal, Pennsylvania	Jonathan Davenport ($10,000)	Jonathan Davenport	Jimmy Owens	Mike Marlar
12	Apr 18	River Valley 40 - Port Royal Speedway, Port Royal, Pennsylvania	Jonathan Davenport ($10,000)	Devin Moran	Jeff Rine	Brandon Sheppard
12	Apr 18	River Valley 40 - Port Royal Speedway, Port Royal, Pennsylvania	Jonathan Davenport ($10,000)	Brandon Sheppard		
12	Apr 18	River Valley 40 - Port Royal Speedway, Port Royal, Pennsylvania	Jonathan Davenport ($10,000)	Shane Clanton		44 cars entered
13	Apr 30	John Bradshaw Memorial - Ponderosa Speedway, Junction City, Kentucky	Jonathan Davenport ($12,000)	Tim McCreadie		Tim McCreadie
13	Apr 30	John Bradshaw Memorial - Ponderosa Speedway, Junction City, Kentucky	Jonathan Davenport ($12,000)	Mike Marlar		Jonathan Davenport
13	Apr 30	John Bradshaw Memorial - Ponderosa Speedway, Junction City, Kentucky	Jonathan Davenport ($12,000)	Jonathan Davenport		
13	Apr 30	John Bradshaw Memorial - Ponderosa Speedway, Junction City, Kentucky	Jonathan Davenport ($12,000)			25 cars entered
14	May 1	Ralph Latham Memorial - Florence Speedway, Union, Kentucky	Josh Rice ($15,000)	Jonathan Davenport	Darrell Lanigan	Stormy Scott
14	May 1	Ralph Latham Memorial - Florence Speedway, Union, Kentucky	Josh Rice ($15,000)	Josh Richards	Tyler Erb	Devin Moran
14	May 1	Ralph Latham Memorial - Florence Speedway, Union, Kentucky	Josh Rice ($15,000)	Devin Moran		
14	May 1	Ralph Latham Memorial - Florence Speedway, Union, Kentucky	Josh Rice ($15,000)	Josh Rice		38 cars entered
15	May 21	Truck Country 50 - 300 Raceway, Farley, Iowa	Mike Marlar ($12,000)	Tim McCreadie	Bobby Pierce	Tim McCreadie
15	May 21	Truck Country 50 - 300 Raceway, Farley, Iowa	Mike Marlar ($12,000)	Josh Richards		Kyle Bronson
15	May 21	Truck Country 50 - 300 Raceway, Farley, Iowa	Mike Marlar ($12,000)	Kyle Bronson		
15	May 21	Truck Country 50 - 300 Raceway, Farley, Iowa	Mike Marlar ($12,000)	Mike Marlar		28 cars entered
16	May 27	Cowboy Classic - Lucas Oil Speedway, Wheatland, Missouri	Tim McCreadie ($6,000)	Brandon Sheppard	Jonathan Davenport	Brandon Sheppard
16	May 27	Cowboy Classic - Lucas Oil Speedway, Wheatland, Missouri	Tim McCreadie ($6,000)	Tim McCreadie	Rick Eckert	Frank Heckenast Jr.
16	May 27	Cowboy Classic - Lucas Oil Speedway, Wheatland, Missouri	Tim McCreadie ($6,000)	Bobby Pierce	Mike Marlar	
16	May 27	Cowboy Classic - Lucas Oil Speedway, Wheatland, Missouri	Tim McCreadie ($6,000)	Scott Crigler		
16	May 27	Cowboy Classic - Lucas Oil Speedway, Wheatland, Missouri	Tim McCreadie ($6,000)	Ryan Gustin		
16	May 27	Cowboy Classic - Lucas Oil Speedway, Wheatland, Missouri	Tim McCreadie ($6,000)	Hudson O'Neal		58 cars entered
17	May 28	Tribute to Don & Billie Gibson - Lucas Oil Speedway, Wheatland, Missouri	Josh Richards ($6,000)	Brian Shirley	Mike Marlar	Ricky Thornton Jr.
17	May 28	Tribute to Don & Billie Gibson - Lucas Oil Speedway, Wheatland, Missouri	Josh Richards ($6,000)	Kyle Bronson	Garrett Alberson	Scott Bloomquist
17	May 28	Tribute to Don & Billie Gibson - Lucas Oil Speedway, Wheatland, Missouri	Josh Richards ($6,000)	Shane Clanton	Billy Moyer Jr.	
17	May 28	Tribute to Don & Billie Gibson - Lucas Oil Speedway, Wheatland, Missouri	Josh Richards ($6,000)	Scott Bloomquist		
17	May 28	Tribute to Don & Billie Gibson - Lucas Oil Speedway, Wheatland, Missouri	Josh Richards ($6,000)	Ryan Gustin		
17	May 28	Tribute to Don & Billie Gibson - Lucas Oil Speedway, Wheatland, Missouri	Josh Richards ($6,000)	Josh Richards		58 cars entered
18	May 29	Show-Me 100 - Lucas Oil Speedway, Wheatland, Missouri	Hudson O'Neal ($30,000)		Jonathan Davenport	
18	May 29	Show-Me 100 - Lucas Oil Speedway, Wheatland, Missouri	Hudson O'Neal ($30,000)		Rick Eckert	
18	May 29	Show-Me 100 - Lucas Oil Speedway, Wheatland, Missouri	Hudson O'Neal ($30,000)		Logan Martin	58 cars entered
19	June 17	Clash at the Mag - Magnolia Motor Speedway, Columbus, Mississippi	Jonathan Davenport ($5,000)	Kyle Bronson	Spencer Hughes	Kyle Bronson
19	June 17	Clash at the Mag - Magnolia Motor Speedway, Columbus, Mississippi	Jonathan Davenport ($5,000)	Tim McCreadie		Josh Putnam
19	June 17	Clash at the Mag - Magnolia Motor Speedway, Columbus, Mississippi	Jonathan Davenport ($5,000)	Jonathan Davenport		
19	June 17	Clash at the Mag - Magnolia Motor Speedway, Columbus, Mississippi	Jonathan Davenport ($5,000)	Mike Marlar		43 cars entered
20	June 18	Clash at the Mag - Magnolia Motor Speedway, Columbus, Mississippi	Jonathan Davenport ($12,000)	Jonathan Davenport	Logan Martin	Jonathan Davenport
20	June 18	Clash at the Mag - Magnolia Motor Speedway, Columbus, Mississippi	Jonathan Davenport ($12,000)	Jimmy Owens	Hudson O'Neal	Brian Rickman
20	June 18	Clash at the Mag - Magnolia Motor Speedway, Columbus, Mississippi	Jonathan Davenport ($12,000)	Earl Pearson Jr.		
20	June 18	Clash at the Mag - Magnolia Motor Speedway, Columbus, Mississippi	Jonathan Davenport ($12,000)	Mike Marlar		42 cars entered
21	Jul 2	Independence 50 - Portsmouth Raceway Park, Portsmouth, Ohio	Jonathan Davenport ($12,000)	Tim McCreadie		Jonathan Davenport
21	Jul 2	Independence 50 - Portsmouth Raceway Park, Portsmouth, Ohio	Jonathan Davenport ($12,000)	Kyle Bronson		Tim McCreadie
21	Jul 2	Independence 50 - Portsmouth Raceway Park, Portsmouth, Ohio	Jonathan Davenport ($12,000)	Devin Moran		25 cars entered
22	Jul 3	Prime Solutions 50 - Muskingum County Speedway, Zanesville, Ohio	Tim McCreadie ($15,000)	Spencer Hughes	Shane Clanton	Jimmy Owens
22	Jul 3	Prime Solutions 50 - Muskingum County Speedway, Zanesville, Ohio	Tim McCreadie ($15,000)	Kyle Bronson		Tim McCreadie
22	Jul 3	Prime Solutions 50 - Muskingum County Speedway, Zanesville, Ohio	Tim McCreadie ($15,000)	Tim McCreadie		
22	Jul 3	Prime Solutions 50 - Muskingum County Speedway, Zanesville, Ohio	Tim McCreadie ($15,000)	Devin Moran		32 cars entered
23	Jul 17	Diamond Nationals - Lucas Oil Speedway, Wheatland, Missouri	Jonathan Davenport ($15,000)	Stormy Scott	Ricky Thornton Jr.	Stormy Scott
23	Jul 17	Diamond Nationals - Lucas Oil Speedway, Wheatland, Missouri	Jonathan Davenport ($15,000)	Kyle Bronson	Garrett Alberson	Jimmy Owens
23	Jul 17	Diamond Nationals - Lucas Oil Speedway, Wheatland, Missouri	Jonathan Davenport ($15,000)	Jimmy Owens		
23	Jul 17	Diamond Nationals - Lucas Oil Speedway, Wheatland, Missouri	Jonathan Davenport ($15,000)	Jonathan Davenport		34 cars entered
24	Jul 20	I-80 Nationals - I-80 Speedway, Greenwood, Nebraska	Brandon Overton ($7,000)	Jonathan Davenport	Jimmy Owens	Spencer Hughes
24	Jul 20	I-80 Nationals - I-80 Speedway, Greenwood, Nebraska	Brandon Overton ($7,000)	Tad Pospisil	Spencer Hughes	Brandon Overton
24	Jul 20	I-80 Nationals - I-80 Speedway, Greenwood, Nebraska	Brandon Overton ($7,000)	Shane Clanton		
24	Jul 20	I-80 Nationals - I-80 Speedway, Greenwood, Nebraska	Brandon Overton ($7,000)	Bill Leighton		43 cars entered
25	Jul 21	I-80 Nationals - I-80 Speedway, Greenwood, Nebraska	Tyler Erb ($7,000)	Kyle Bronson	Matt Cosner	Jonathan Davenport
25	Jul 21	I-80 Nationals - I-80 Speedway, Greenwood, Nebraska	Tyler Erb ($7,000)	Spencer Hughes	Scott Bloomquist	Jake Neal
25	Jul 21	I-80 Nationals - I-80 Speedway, Greenwood, Nebraska	Tyler Erb ($7,000)	Brandon Sheppard		
25	Jul 21	I-80 Nationals - I-80 Speedway, Greenwood, Nebraska	Tyler Erb ($7,000)	Ricky Weiss		44 cars entered
26	Jul 22	I-80 Nationals - I-80 Speedway, Greenwood, Nebraska	Tyler Erb ($30,000)		Josh Richards	
26	Jul 22	I-80 Nationals - I-80 Speedway, Greenwood, Nebraska	Tyler Erb ($30,000)		Chad Simpson	44 cars entered
27	Jul 23–24	I-80 Nationals - I-80 Speedway, Greenwood, Nebraska	Kyle Bronson ($53,000)	Brian Shirley	Terry Phillips	
27	Jul 23–24	I-80 Nationals - I-80 Speedway, Greenwood, Nebraska	Kyle Bronson ($53,000)	Chris Simpson	Josh Richards	
27	Jul 23–24	I-80 Nationals - I-80 Speedway, Greenwood, Nebraska	Kyle Bronson ($53,000)	Tad Pospisil		
27	Jul 23–24	I-80 Nationals - I-80 Speedway, Greenwood, Nebraska	Kyle Bronson ($53,000)	Kyle Bronson		
27	Jul 23–24	I-80 Nationals - I-80 Speedway, Greenwood, Nebraska	Kyle Bronson ($53,000)	Shane Clanton		
27	Jul 23–24	I-80 Nationals - I-80 Speedway, Greenwood, Nebraska	Kyle Bronson ($53,000)	Ricky Weiss		
27	Jul 23–24	I-80 Nationals - I-80 Speedway, Greenwood, Nebraska	Kyle Bronson ($53,000)	Scott Bloomquist		
27	Jul 23–24	I-80 Nationals - I-80 Speedway, Greenwood, Nebraska	Kyle Bronson ($53,000)	Stormy Scott		
27	Jul 23–24	I-80 Nationals - I-80 Speedway, Greenwood, Nebraska	Kyle Bronson ($53,000)	Jonathan Davenport		
27	Jul 23–24	I-80 Nationals - I-80 Speedway, Greenwood, Nebraska	Kyle Bronson ($53,000)	Hudson O'Neal		44 cars entered
28	Aug 12	North/South Shootout - Florence Speedway, Union, Kentucky	Brandon Overton ($10,000)	Ricky Thornton Jr.	James Rice	Ricky Thornton Jr.
28	Aug 12	North/South Shootout - Florence Speedway, Union, Kentucky	Brandon Overton ($10,000)	Mike Marlar	Shane Clanton	Brandon Overton
28	Aug 12	North/South Shootout - Florence Speedway, Union, Kentucky	Brandon Overton ($10,000)	Brandon Overton		
28	Aug 12	North/South Shootout - Florence Speedway, Union, Kentucky	Brandon Overton ($10,000)	Tim McCreadie		46 cars entered
29	Aug 13–14	North/South 100 - Florence Speedway, Union, Kentucky	Brandon Overton ($50,000)	Michael Chilton	Devin Gilpin	
29	Aug 13–14	North/South 100 - Florence Speedway, Union, Kentucky	Brandon Overton ($50,000)	Tyler Erb	Ricky Thornton Jr.	
29	Aug 13–14	North/South 100 - Florence Speedway, Union, Kentucky	Brandon Overton ($50,000)	Kyle Strickler		
29	Aug 13–14	North/South 100 - Florence Speedway, Union, Kentucky	Brandon Overton ($50,000)	Jonathan Davenport		
29	Aug 13–14	North/South 100 - Florence Speedway, Union, Kentucky	Brandon Overton ($50,000)	Tim McCreadie		
29	Aug 13–14	North/South 100 - Florence Speedway, Union, Kentucky	Brandon Overton ($50,000)	Tim McCreadie		
29	Aug 13–14	North/South 100 - Florence Speedway, Union, Kentucky	Brandon Overton ($50,000)	Brandon Overton		
29	Aug 13–14	North/South 100 - Florence Speedway, Union, Kentucky	Brandon Overton ($50,000)	Josh Rice		
29	Aug 13–14	North/South 100 - Florence Speedway, Union, Kentucky	Brandon Overton ($50,000)	Hudson O'Neal		
29	Aug 13–14	North/South 100 - Florence Speedway, Union, Kentucky	Brandon Overton ($50,000)	Jimmy Owens		46 cars entered
30	Aug 20	Topless 100 Prelims - Batesville Motor Speedway, Locust Grove, Arkansas	Jimmy Owens ($5,000)	Jimmy Owens	Wendell Wallace	Jimmy Owens
30	Aug 20	Topless 100 Prelims - Batesville Motor Speedway, Locust Grove, Arkansas	Jimmy Owens ($5,000)	Brandon Overton	Kylan Garner	Jonathan Davenport
30	Aug 20	Topless 100 Prelims - Batesville Motor Speedway, Locust Grove, Arkansas	Jimmy Owens ($5,000)	Tim McCreadie		
30	Aug 20	Topless 100 Prelims - Batesville Motor Speedway, Locust Grove, Arkansas	Jimmy Owens ($5,000)	Billy Moyer Jr.		
30	Aug 20	Topless 100 Prelims - Batesville Motor Speedway, Locust Grove, Arkansas	Jimmy Owens ($5,000)	Nick Hoffman		
30	Aug 20	Topless 100 Prelims - Batesville Motor Speedway, Locust Grove, Arkansas	Jimmy Owens ($5,000)	Hudson O'Neal		47 cars entered
31	Aug 21	Topless 100 - Batesville Motor Speedway, Locust Grove, Arkansas	Hudson O'Neal ($40,000)		Billy Moyer	
31	Aug 21	Topless 100 - Batesville Motor Speedway, Locust Grove, Arkansas	Hudson O'Neal ($40,000)		Kyle Bronson	47 cars entered
32	Aug 26	Rumble by the River - Port Royal Speedway, Port Royal, Pennsylvania	Hudson O'Neal ($10,000)	Jonathan Davenport	Andy Haus	Jonathan Davenport
32	Aug 26	Rumble by the River - Port Royal Speedway, Port Royal, Pennsylvania	Hudson O'Neal ($10,000)	Mike Marlar	Jimmy Owens	Jimmy Owens
32	Aug 26	Rumble by the River - Port Royal Speedway, Port Royal, Pennsylvania	Hudson O'Neal ($10,000)	Hudson O'Neal		
32	Aug 26	Rumble by the River - Port Royal Speedway, Port Royal, Pennsylvania	Hudson O'Neal ($10,000)	Shane Clanton		43 cars entered
33	Aug 27	Rumble by the River - Port Royal Speedway, Port Royal, Pennsylvania	Tim McCreadie ($12,000)	Jonathan Davenport	Earl Pearson Jr.	Jonathan Davenport
33	Aug 27	Rumble by the River - Port Royal Speedway, Port Royal, Pennsylvania	Tim McCreadie ($12,000)	Chris Ferguson	Gregg Satterlee	Tim McCreadie
33	Aug 27	Rumble by the River - Port Royal Speedway, Port Royal, Pennsylvania	Tim McCreadie ($12,000)	Tim McCreadie		
33	Aug 27	Rumble by the River - Port Royal Speedway, Port Royal, Pennsylvania	Tim McCreadie ($12,000)	Jimmy Owens		46 cars entered
34	Sep 4	Rumble River Days - Portsmouth Raceway Park, Portsmouth, Ohio	Tim McCreadie ($15,000)	Devin Moran	Josh Rice	Devin Moran
34	Sep 4	Rumble River Days - Portsmouth Raceway Park, Portsmouth, Ohio	Tim McCreadie ($15,000)	Tim McCreadie		Kyle Bronson
34	Sep 4	Rumble River Days - Portsmouth Raceway Park, Portsmouth, Ohio	Tim McCreadie ($15,000)	Kyle Bronson		
34	Sep 4	Rumble River Days - Portsmouth Raceway Park, Portsmouth, Ohio	Tim McCreadie ($15,000)	Spencer Hughes		29 cars entered
35	Sep 16	Lucas Oil Late Model Knoxville Nationals - Knoxville Raceway, Knoxville, Iowa	Tyler Erb ($7,000)	Chase Junghans	Ricky Thornton Jr.	Kyle Strickler
35	Sep 16	Lucas Oil Late Model Knoxville Nationals - Knoxville Raceway, Knoxville, Iowa	Tyler Erb ($7,000)	Tim McCreadie	Shane Clanton	Kyle Larson
35	Sep 16	Lucas Oil Late Model Knoxville Nationals - Knoxville Raceway, Knoxville, Iowa	Tyler Erb ($7,000)	Ricky Weiss		
35	Sep 16	Lucas Oil Late Model Knoxville Nationals - Knoxville Raceway, Knoxville, Iowa	Tyler Erb ($7,000)	Tyler Erb		
35	Sep 16	Lucas Oil Late Model Knoxville Nationals - Knoxville Raceway, Knoxville, Iowa	Tyler Erb ($7,000)	Hudson O'Neal		
35	Sep 16	Lucas Oil Late Model Knoxville Nationals - Knoxville Raceway, Knoxville, Iowa	Tyler Erb ($7,000)	Josh Richards		48 cars entered
36	Sep 17	Lucas Oil Late Model Knoxville Nationals - Knoxville Raceway, Knoxville, Iowa	Tyler Erb ($7,000)	Jonathan Davenport	Hudson O'Neal	Jonathan Davenport
36	Sep 17	Lucas Oil Late Model Knoxville Nationals - Knoxville Raceway, Knoxville, Iowa	Tyler Erb ($7,000)	Brandon Sheppard	Logan Martin	Tad Pospisil
36	Sep 17	Lucas Oil Late Model Knoxville Nationals - Knoxville Raceway, Knoxville, Iowa	Tyler Erb ($7,000)	Jimmy Owens		
36	Sep 17	Lucas Oil Late Model Knoxville Nationals - Knoxville Raceway, Knoxville, Iowa	Tyler Erb ($7,000)	Frank Heckenast Jr.		
36	Sep 17	Lucas Oil Late Model Knoxville Nationals - Knoxville Raceway, Knoxville, Iowa	Tyler Erb ($7,000)	Shane Clanton		
36	Sep 17	Lucas Oil Late Model Knoxville Nationals - Knoxville Raceway, Knoxville, Iowa	Tyler Erb ($7,000)	Tim McCreadie		47 cars entered
37	Sep 18	Lucas Oil Late Model Knoxville Nationals - Knoxville Raceway, Knoxville, Iowa	Mike Marlar ($50,000)		Tony Jackson Jr.	
37	Sep 18	Lucas Oil Late Model Knoxville Nationals - Knoxville Raceway, Knoxville, Iowa	Mike Marlar ($50,000)		Ryan Gustin	47 cars entered
38	Sep 23	Indiana Icebreaker - Brownstown Speedway, Brownstown, Indiana	Brandon Sheppard ($15,000)	Josh Richards	Shelby Miles	Josh Richards
38	Sep 23	Indiana Icebreaker - Brownstown Speedway, Brownstown, Indiana	Brandon Sheppard ($15,000)	Kyle Bronson	Joe Godsey	Brandon Sheppard
38	Sep 23	Indiana Icebreaker - Brownstown Speedway, Brownstown, Indiana	Brandon Sheppard ($15,000)	Brandon Sheppard		
38	Sep 23	Indiana Icebreaker - Brownstown Speedway, Brownstown, Indiana	Brandon Sheppard ($15,000)	Devin Moran		42 cars entered
39	Sep 24	Night Before the Jackson - Brownstown Speedway, Brownstown, Indiana	Tyler Erb ($10,000)	Scott James	Mike Marlar	Mike Marlar
39	Sep 24	Night Before the Jackson - Brownstown Speedway, Brownstown, Indiana	Tyler Erb ($10,000)	Hudson O'Neal	Stormy Scott	Josh Rice
39	Sep 24	Night Before the Jackson - Brownstown Speedway, Brownstown, Indiana	Tyler Erb ($10,000)	Josh Rice		
39	Sep 24	Night Before the Jackson - Brownstown Speedway, Brownstown, Indiana	Tyler Erb ($10,000)	Jimmy Owens		40 cars entered
40	Sep 25	Jackson 100 - Brownstown Speedway, Brownstown, Indiana	Jimmy Owens ($20,000)	Jimmy Owens	Johnny Scott	Devin Gilpin
40	Sep 25	Jackson 100 - Brownstown Speedway, Brownstown, Indiana	Jimmy Owens ($20,000)	Earl Pearson Jr.	Steve Casebolt	Billy Moyer Jr.
40	Sep 25	Jackson 100 - Brownstown Speedway, Brownstown, Indiana	Jimmy Owens ($20,000)	Spencer Hughes		
40	Sep 25	Jackson 100 - Brownstown Speedway, Brownstown, Indiana	Jimmy Owens ($20,000)	Mike Marlar		39 cars entered
41	Oct 1	Great Lakes 50 - Raceway 7, Monroe Center, Ohio	Tim McCreadie ($12,000)	Tim McCreadie	Stormy Scott	Tim McCreadie
41	Oct 1	Great Lakes 50 - Raceway 7, Monroe Center, Ohio	Tim McCreadie ($12,000)	Shane Clanton		
41	Oct 1	Great Lakes 50 - Raceway 7, Monroe Center, Ohio	Tim McCreadie ($12,000)	Tyler Erb		27 cars entered
42	Oct 2	Pittsburgher 100 - Pittsburgh's PA Motor Speedway, Imperial, Pennsylvania	Hudson O'Neal ($20,000)	Tim McCreadie	Hudson O'Neal	Tim McCreadie
42	Oct 2	Pittsburgher 100 - Pittsburgh's PA Motor Speedway, Imperial, Pennsylvania	Hudson O'Neal ($20,000)	Jonathan Davenport	Mason Zeigler	Earl Pearson Jr.
42	Oct 2	Pittsburgher 100 - Pittsburgh's PA Motor Speedway, Imperial, Pennsylvania	Hudson O'Neal ($20,000)	Earl Pearson Jr.		
42	Oct 2	Pittsburgher 100 - Pittsburgh's PA Motor Speedway, Imperial, Pennsylvania	Hudson O'Neal ($20,000)	Tyler Erb		34 cars entered
43	Oct 9	Dixie Shootout - Dixie Speedway, Woodstock, Georgia	Jonathan Davenport ($15,000)	Jonathan Davenport	Christian Hanger	Jonathan Davenport
43	Oct 9	Dixie Shootout - Dixie Speedway, Woodstock, Georgia	Jonathan Davenport ($15,000)	Brandon Overton	Jimmy Owens	Tim McCreadie
43	Oct 9	Dixie Shootout - Dixie Speedway, Woodstock, Georgia	Jonathan Davenport ($15,000)	Tim McCreadie		
43	Oct 9	Dixie Shootout - Dixie Speedway, Woodstock, Georgia	Jonathan Davenport ($15,000)	Chris Madden		38 cars entered
44	Oct 10	Rome Showdown - Rome Speedway, Rome, Georgia	Jonathan Davenport ($10,000)	Jimmy Owens		Jimmy Owens
44	Oct 10	Rome Showdown - Rome Speedway, Rome, Georgia	Jonathan Davenport ($10,000)	Jonathan Davenport		Josh Richards
44	Oct 10	Rome Showdown - Rome Speedway, Rome, Georgia	Jonathan Davenport ($10,000)	Tim McCreadie		26 cars entered
45	Oct 16	Dirt Track World Championship - Portsmouth Raceway Park, Portsmouth, Ohio	Ricky Thornton Jr. ($100,000)	Ricky Thornton Jr.	Tyler Erb	Ricky Thornton Jr.
45	Oct 16	Dirt Track World Championship - Portsmouth Raceway Park, Portsmouth, Ohio	Ricky Thornton Jr. ($100,000)	Spencer Hughes	Dustin Linville	Devin Moran
45	Oct 16	Dirt Track World Championship - Portsmouth Raceway Park, Portsmouth, Ohio	Ricky Thornton Jr. ($100,000)	Kyle Bronson		
45	Oct 16	Dirt Track World Championship - Portsmouth Raceway Park, Portsmouth, Ohio	Ricky Thornton Jr. ($100,000)	Devin Moran		
45	Oct 16	Dirt Track World Championship - Portsmouth Raceway Park, Portsmouth, Ohio	Ricky Thornton Jr. ($100,000)	Jimmy Owens		
45	Oct 16	Dirt Track World Championship - Portsmouth Raceway Park, Portsmouth, Ohio	Ricky Thornton Jr. ($100,000)	Scott Bloomquist		60 cars entered

=== Schedule notes and changes ===
- The Super Bowl of Racing scheduled for January 21–23 at the Golden Isles Raceway in Brunswick, Georgia was canceled due to concerns about COVID transmission in the local area.
- A rescheduled first night of the General Tire Winter Nationals at All-Tech Raceway in Lake City, Florida on January 22 was canceled due to rain.
- The Indiana Icebreaker scheduled for March 20 at the Brownstown Speedway was postponed mid-program after track conditions led to multiple flips during competition. The make-up was originally scheduled for May 2 was again postponed to September 23 after scheduled demolition of a track grandstand began in April.
- An Illinois doubleheader for the LOLMDS was canceled due to rain and cold. The canceled events included the Bullet Race Engines 50 at Tri-City Speedway in Granite City on April 23 and the Lucas Oil 100 at Macon Speedway on April 24.
- LOLMDS races scheduled for May 14 at the 411 Motor Speedway in Seymour, Tennessee and the Talladega Short Track in Eastaboga, Alabama were canceled due to gas shortages relating to the Colonial Pipeline hack.
- The CRST 50 at 34 Raceway in West Burlington, Iowa scheduled for May 22 was postponed to July 15 due to persistent rainfall.
- The June 19 finale of the Clash at the Mag at Magnolia Motor Speedway was canceled due to forecasts for heavy rain.
- The Gopher 50 scheduled for June 25 and 26 at Deer Creek Speedway in Spring Valley, Minnesota was rained out.
- The Grassy Smith Memorial scheduled for July 8 at the Cherokee Speedway in Gaffney, South Carolina was canceled due to Hurricane Elsa.
- The Mountain Moonshine Classic at Smoky Mountain Speedway in Maryville, Tennessee scheduled for July 9 was rained out. The second night of the event, originally scheduled for July 10, was postponed to October 8.
- The rescheduled CRST 50 at 34 Raceway was rained out for July 15.
- The NAPA Know How 50 at Tri-City Speedway in Granite City, Illinois scheduled for July 16 was canceled due to a bad forecast.
- The first preliminary night of the Topless 100 at Batesville Motor Speedway in Locust Grove, Arkansas scheduled for August 19 was rained out.
- The finale of the Rumble by the River at Port Royal Speedway in Port Royal, Pennsylvania scheduled for August 28 was rained out.
- The GO-50 scheduled for September 15 at I-80 Speedway in Greenwood, Nebraska was canceled due to ongoing tire shortages.
- The Hillbilly 100 scheduled for September 5 at Tyler County Speedway in Middlebourne, West Virginia was rained out and rescheduled for April 8, 2022.
- The rescheduled Mountain Moonshine Classic at Smoky Mountain Speedway in Maryville, Tennessee for October 8 was rained out.

== Season summary ==
=== Race reports ===
Round 1: 2021 General Tire Winter Nationals

Kyle Larson passed Tyler Erb for the lead on lap 14 and proceeded to obliterate the field in the LOLMDS season opener, lapping up to the eighth-place car and winning the 50-lap feature by more than 15 seconds over runner-up Devin Moran. The feature went caution-free.

Round 2: 2021 Winternationals - Feature #1

Hudson O'Neal used the low side to hold off a hard-charging Brandon Sheppard during a green-white-checkered finish to win the season's first feature at East Bay Raceway Park. O'Neal led the final 11 laps of the race after race leader Tyler Erb spun as a result of contact with Devin Moran. 10 yellow flags slowed the 30-lap Winternationals opener for the series.

Round 3: 2021 Winternationals - Feature #2

Tyler Erb snuck under Brandon Overton exiting turn 2 with three laps to go in the 30-lap feature, then prevailed on a one-lap restart after the caution flag flew on lap 30 to score his first win of 2021. Erb charged from ninth to the race lead to score the win in a caution-filled feature that was slowed by five yellows and a lap 1 red flag "Big One" that saw Tim McCreadie, Gregg Satterlee, Frank Heckenast Jr. and Dennis Erb Jr. collected after Shane Clanton got sideways in turn 2.

Round 4: 2021 Winternationals - Feature #3

Josh Richards led the final 34 laps of the first 40-lap Winternationals feature, taking the lead from Florida late model ace Mark Whitener on lap 7. For the second consecutive race, the finish came down to a one-lap shootout, with Richards holding off Brandon Overton. As with every race at East Bay this season, the feature was full of incidents, with the caution flag flying eight times, five of which were for multi-car incidents.

Round 5: 2021 Winternationals - Feature #4

Stormy Scott charged to the front early and took the lead from Brian Shirley on lap 7 of 40, riding the low side on a super slick East Bay surface to score his first career LOLMDS victory. Scott went unchallenged for the win during a long green-flag run to close out the feature. Two incidents of note marked this feature; lap 5 saw Mason Zeigler spin Tyler Erb in turn 1 after the two had been racing close-quarters since the drop of the green flag, while lap 14 saw a "Big One" involving more than a dozen cars block the track in turn 2 after Frank Heckenast Jr. came down on Shane Clanton in turn 1 and sent him spinning.

Round 6: 2021 Winternationals - Feature #5

Brandon Overton dominated the second half of Friday's 50-lap feature to score his first LOLMDS win of 2021, proving untouchable out front after the first half of the race produced four different leaders. The race went 20 caution-free laps to start but would be slowed by two lengthy stoppages; one under a lap 25 yellow after Bobby Pierce knocked down wall panels in turn 4, and again on lap 30 when the red flag flew for Chase Junghans flipping after contact with Mason Zeigler. Zeigler was in the middle of numerous incidents on the night, including contact with Tyler Erb in a heat race that would see Erb parked for the night; Erb slammed into Zeigler's car on the cooldown lap of their heat race.

Round 7: 2021 Winternationals - Feature #5

Tyler Erb returned to competition with a vengeance after being parked the night before at East Bay, besting Tim McCreadie with 18 laps to go and holding off a deep-charging Jonathan Davenport to win the Winternationals finale feature, becoming the first repeat LOLMDS tour winner in 2021.

Round 8: 2021 K&N Filters Winter Nationals - Feature #1

Ricky Thornton Jr. took the lead on lap 14 and weathered several late-race cautions and a mid-race charge from Hudson O'Neal to win the 40-lap feature at Bubba Raceway Park. Brian Shirley led the opening 11 laps before ceding to Jonathan Davenport. Davenport found trouble on a lap 14 restart, which saw Thornton take the lead after Davenport locked up a tire entering turn 1, triggering a wreck that took out contenders Brandon Sheppard and Jimmy Owens.

Round 9: 2021 K&N Filters Winter Nationals - Feature #2

Shane Clanton snapped a winless streak dating back to 2019 in the final Florida Speedweeks feature for the LOLMDS, taking the lead from Bobby Pierce on lap 22 of the 40-lap feature and never again being challenged for the win after spending the first half of the race dueling with defending series champion Jimmy Owens.

Round 10: 2021 Buckeye Spring 50

Prevailing in a three-wide battle for the lead on a lap 9 restart over Kyle Strickler and Devin Moran, Hudson O'Neal led the final 40-plus laps of the Buckeye Spring 50, scoring the $12,000 win after keeping Tim McCreadie at bay on a final restart with two laps to go. The track opted to start all 29 cars in the feature in lieu of running a B-main.

Round 11: 2021 Nininger Tribute

Tim McCreadie got underneath Ricky Thornton Jr. in turn 2 on the final lap to score his first LOLMDS win of the season in dramatic fashion, having erased a 1.1-second lead in the final five laps. Thornton Jr. had led every lap of the feature prior to the last one and seemed to struggle with trying to lap Devin Moran as the feature wound down. McCreadie had run second for much of the race and actually got to Thornton's bumper on lap 25 but couldn't challenge for the lead.

Round 12: 2021 River Valley 40

Jonathan Davenport became the first polesitter to win a LOLMDS feature in 2021, leading all 40 laps at Port Royal. Shane Clanton made it interesting in the closing laps, getting alongside Davenport several times but proving unable to make the pass stick.

Round 13: 2021 John Bradshaw Memorial

Jonathan Davenport scored a last-lap victory at Ponderosa Speedway, getting to the high side on race leader Tim McCreadie who got stuck behind lapped traffic exiting turn 4 coming to the checkers. McCreadie, who led all but a handful of laps in the feature after a mid-race duel with Mike Marlar, had actually been bailed out by a caution flag on lap 15, with Davenport set to pass him for the lead immediately prior to the yellow flag flying.

Round 14: 2021 Ralph Latham Memorial

Florence Speedway fixture Josh Rice pressed race leader Hudson O'Neal for more than 20 laps before finally besting him, passing O'Neal in turn 2 with four laps to go and driving off to the biggest win of his career in front of packed grandstands. O'Neal had kept Rice at bay despite repeated slide jobs in turn 2, but heavy lapped traffic in the closing laps got O'Neal off line just enough for Rice to make the winning pass.
