= Volunteer Speedway =

Dirt race track in Bulls Gap, Tennessee

The Gap
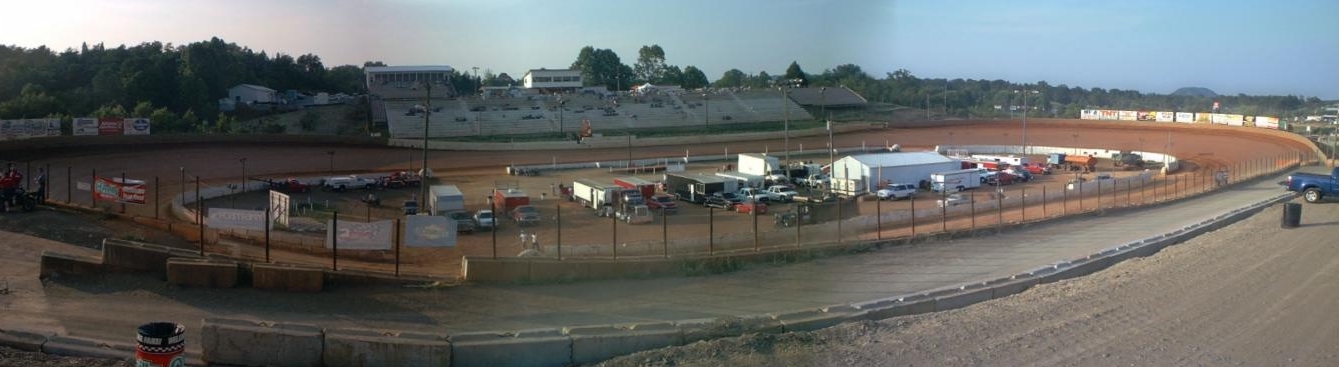
- Volunteer Speedway in 2006
- Location: near Bulls Gap, Tennessee
- Coordinates: 36.22318°N 83.05283°W
- Broke ground: 1973
- Opened: 1974

4/10 Mile
- Surface: dirt
- Length: 0.40 mi (0.65 km)
- Turns: 4
- Banking: 32° (turns)
- Race lap record: 10.258 (Kasey Kahne, Sprints)

Volunteer Speedway is a 4/10 mile long dirt race track located in Greene County in the eastern part of Tennessee, in Mosheim (14095 West Andrew Johnson Highway, Bulls Gap, TN postal address). It is known as "The World's Fastest Dirt Track". It has the nickname of "The Gap." The track is banked at 32 degrees in the corners and is known for its high speed. The track record of 10.258 seconds is held by Kasey Kahne in a sprint car.

== History ==
It was originally built in 1973 and opened during the 1974 racing season. The track was originally owned by Ed Turner before Joe and Phyllis Loven ran the track. Mitch McCarter (the owner of 411 Speedway) leased the track in 2017 and 2018. Stan Lester, owner of FASTRAK Racing Series, operated the track with Phyllis Loven in early 2019 before the track was leased to Landon Stallard. Stallard tried to put the track up for sale in February 2021 while continuing to operate the track.

== Racing Events ==
The track hosts regional and national dirt track events for several sanctioning bodies. It holds national events including the World of Outlaws Late Model Series and Crate Nationals. As of 2020, the World of Outlaws have raced at the track in 2004, 2007, 2008, 2018, and 2020. The Lucas Oil Late Model Dirt Series held races at the track in 2007, 2008, twice in 2009, three times in 2010, 2011, 2012, 2013, and 2014. Regional events include: Schaeffer’s Oil Iron-Man Championship Late Model Series, FASTRAK Racing Series, American Sprint Car Series, and the Southern Nationals. The track previously held events for the All Star Circuit of Champions sprint cars. Between 2004 and 2020, the track has hosted 17 national dirt late model races between the World of Outlaws and Lucas Oil sanctions. Winners in those 17 races include Jimmy Owens (3), Scott Bloomquist (2), and Tim McCreadie.

The track is still operating on a weekly basis running local events. Weekly classes include Crate late models, Steel Head Late Models, Sportsman Late Model, Modified Streets, and Classic. The track works with nearby 411 Motor Speedway, Smoky Mountain Speedway, and Tazewell Speedway for matters of mutual concern.
