= Baton Rouge Raceway =

Racetrack

Coordinates: 30.62205°N 91.12166°W

Baton Rouge Raceway located in Baker, Louisiana is a 3/8 mile dirt oval race track. It is the home track of the O'Reilly SUPR racing series. In 2007 the hosted a combined race of World of Outlaws Late Model Series and O'Reilly SUPR Late Model Series, the event was won by Chris Madden.
