= Nebraska Raceway Park =

Racing facility in Case County, Nebraska, U.S.

Coordinates: 40°58′47.84″N 96°23′43.14″W

I-80 Speedway
- Location: Cass County, at 14200 238th St Greenwood, NE 68366
- Owner: Land Developers Inc.
- Operator: Tom Gutowski
- Opened: 1994
- Closed: 2023
- Major events: NASCAR Whelen All-American Series

Oval
- Length: 0.37 mi (0.6 km)
- Banking: Turns - N/A; Straights - N/A

Nebraska Raceway Park was a multiuse racing facility in southeastern Nebraska near Greenwood, Nebraska.

The track was near the interchange of Interstate 80 and Nebraska Highway 63 at exit 420.

I-80 Speedway was part of the Nebraska Raceway Park, which also had Little Sunset Speedway made for go-kart racing and a motocross track located behind the track.

Nebraska Raceway Park closed in 2023, and the land was sold for commercial development.

== Events ==
=== Silver Dollar Nationals ===
Founded in 2011, I-80 Speedway hosted the Silver Dollar Nations for 12 years (2011-2022) before being moving to Huset’s Speedway in Brandon, S.D., from 2023-2025. Shelby County Speedway now hosts the Silver Dollar Nationals.

Year	Winner	Year	Winner
2011	Don O'Neal	2017	Tim McCreadie
2012	Brian Birkhofer	2018	Jonathan Davenport
2013	Jimmy Owens	2019	Bobby Pierce
2014	Scott Bloomquist	2020	Brandon Sheppard
2015	Scott Bloomquist	2021	Kyle Bronson
2016	Jonathan Davenport	2022	Jonathan Davenport
