= 2023 Food City Dirt Race =

NASCAR Cup Series race

Race details
- Race 8 of 36 in the 2023 NASCAR Cup Series
- Date: April 9, 2023
- Location: Bristol Motor Speedway in Bristol, Tennessee
- Course: Permanent racing facility
- Course length: 0.533 miles (0.858 km)
- Distance: 250 laps, 133.25 mi (214.445 km)
- Average speed: 46.68 miles per hour (75.12 km/h)

Pole position
| Driver | Kyle Larson | Hendrick Motorsports |
- Time: 15 Passing Points

Most laps led
| Driver | Christopher Bell | Joe Gibbs Racing |
- Laps: 100

Winner
| No. 20 | Christopher Bell | Joe Gibbs Racing |

Television in the United States
- Network: Fox
- Announcers: Mike Joy, Clint Bowyer, and Tony Stewart

Radio in the United States
- Radio: PRN
- Booth announcers: Doug Rice and Mark Garrow
- Turn announcers: Rob Albright (Backstretch)

The 2023 Food City Dirt Race was a NASCAR Cup Series race held on April 9, 2023, at Bristol Motor Speedway in Bristol, Tennessee. Contested over 250 laps on the 0.533 miles (0.858 km) short track, it was the eighth race of the 2023 NASCAR Cup Series season.

This was the final Cup Series race at the Bristol dirt track, as the race returned to concrete in 2024.

== Report ==
=== Background ===
Bristol Motor Speedway, formerly known as Bristol International Raceway and Bristol Raceway, is a NASCAR short track venue located in Bristol, Tennessee. Constructed in 1960, it held its first NASCAR race on July 30, 1961. Bristol is among the most popular tracks on the NASCAR schedule because of its distinct features, which include extraordinarily steep banking combined with short length, an all concrete surface, two pit roads, and stadium-like seating.

In 2021, the race shifted to a dirt surface version of the track and was renamed the Food City Dirt Race.

==== Entry list ====
- (R) denotes rookie driver.
- (i) denotes driver who is ineligible for series driver points.

| No. | Driver | Team | Manufacturer |
|---|---|---|---|
| 1 | Ross Chastain | Trackhouse Racing | Chevrolet |
| 2 | Austin Cindric | Team Penske | Ford |
| 3 | Austin Dillon | Richard Childress Racing | Chevrolet |
| 4 | Kevin Harvick | Stewart-Haas Racing | Ford |
| 5 | Kyle Larson | Hendrick Motorsports | Chevrolet |
| 6 | Brad Keselowski | RFK Racing | Ford |
| 7 | Corey LaJoie | Spire Motorsports | Chevrolet |
| 8 | Kyle Busch | Richard Childress Racing | Chevrolet |
| 9 | Josh Berry (i) | Hendrick Motorsports | Chevrolet |
| 10 | Aric Almirola | Stewart-Haas Racing | Ford |
| 11 | Denny Hamlin | Joe Gibbs Racing | Toyota |
| 12 | Ryan Blaney | Team Penske | Ford |
| 13 | Jonathan Davenport | Kaulig Racing | Chevrolet |
| 14 | Chase Briscoe | Stewart-Haas Racing | Ford |
| 15 | J. J. Yeley (i) | Rick Ware Racing | Ford |
| 16 | A. J. Allmendinger | Kaulig Racing | Chevrolet |
| 17 | Chris Buescher | RFK Racing | Ford |
| 19 | Martin Truex Jr. | Joe Gibbs Racing | Toyota |
| 20 | Christopher Bell | Joe Gibbs Racing | Toyota |
| 21 | Harrison Burton | Wood Brothers Racing | Ford |
| 22 | Joey Logano | Team Penske | Ford |
| 23 | Bubba Wallace | 23XI Racing | Toyota |
| 24 | William Byron | Hendrick Motorsports | Chevrolet |
| 31 | Justin Haley | Kaulig Racing | Chevrolet |
| 34 | Michael McDowell | Front Row Motorsports | Ford |
| 38 | Todd Gilliland | Front Row Motorsports | Ford |
| 41 | Ryan Preece | Stewart-Haas Racing | Ford |
| 42 | Noah Gragson (R) | Legacy Motor Club | Chevrolet |
| 43 | Erik Jones | Legacy Motor Club | Chevrolet |
| 45 | Tyler Reddick | 23XI Racing | Toyota |
| 47 | Ricky Stenhouse Jr. | JTG Daugherty Racing | Chevrolet |
| 48 | Alex Bowman | Hendrick Motorsports | Chevrolet |
| 51 | Matt Crafton (i) (Note: Matt Crafton replaced Cody Ware after Ware had to miss the race due to what at time was announced as a personal matter. On April 10, 2023, Ware was suspended indefinitely by NASCAR after he was arrested and charged with felony assault; the suspension ended on December 12, 2023 when the charges were dropped.) | Rick Ware Racing | Ford |
| 54 | Ty Gibbs (R) | Joe Gibbs Racing | Toyota |
| 77 | Ty Dillon | Spire Motorsports | Chevrolet |
| 78 | B. J. McLeod | Live Fast Motorsports | Chevrolet |
| 99 | Daniel Suárez | Trackhouse Racing | Chevrolet |
Official entry list

== Practice ==
Due to inclement weather, both practice sessions scheduled for Friday were canceled.

== Qualifying heat races ==
Qualifying race procedure similar to that used by the Chili Bowl qualifying nights and Bryan Clauson Classic. Starting order for heat races based on random draw. Grid determined by a combination of passing points and finishing points. Ties broken by owner points.

=== Race 1 ===
| Pos | Grid | No | Driver | Team | Manufacturer | Laps |
|---|---|---|---|---|---|---|
| 1 | 5 | 3 | Austin Dillon | Richard Childress Racing | Chevrolet | 15 |
| 2 | 6 | 45 | Tyler Reddick | 23XI Racing | Toyota | 15 |
| 3 | 8 | 20 | Christopher Bell | Joe Gibbs Racing | Toyota | 15 |
| 4 | 2 | 48 | Alex Bowman | Hendrick Motorsports | Chevrolet | 15 |
| 5 | 1 | 47 | Ricky Stenhouse Jr. | JTG Daugherty Racing | Chevrolet | 15 |
| 6 | 4 | 31 | Justin Haley | Kaulig Racing | Chevrolet | 15 |
| 7 | 10 | 1 | Ross Chastain | Trackhouse Racing | Chevrolet | 15 |
| 8 | 7 | 9 | Josh Berry (i) | Hendrick Motorsports | Chevrolet | 15 |
| 9 | 9 | 6 | Brad Keselowski | RFK Racing | Ford | 15 |
| 10 | 3 | 78 | B. J. McLeod | Live Fast Motorsports | Chevrolet | 15 |
Official race one results

=== Race 2 ===
| Pos | Grid | No | Driver | Team | Manufacturer | Laps |
|---|---|---|---|---|---|---|
| 1 | 1 | 12 | Ryan Blaney | Team Penske | Ford | 15 |
| 2 | 2 | 14 | Chase Briscoe | Stewart-Haas Racing | Ford | 15 |
| 3 | 5 | 24 | William Byron | Hendrick Motorsports | Chevrolet | 15 |
| 4 | 4 | 21 | Harrison Burton | Wood Brothers Racing | Ford | 15 |
| 5 | 6 | 10 | Aric Almirola | Stewart-Haas Racing | Ford | 15 |
| 6 | 9 | 38 | Todd Gilliland | Front Row Motorsports | Ford | 15 |
| 7 | 3 | 16 | A. J. Allmendinger | Kaulig Racing | Chevrolet | 15 |
| 8 | 8 | 11 | Denny Hamlin | Joe Gibbs Racing | Toyota | 15 |
| 9 | 7 | 42 | Noah Gragson (R) | Legacy Motor Club | Chevrolet | 15 |
Official race two results

=== Race 3 ===
| Pos | Grid | No | Driver | Team | Manufacturer | Laps |
|---|---|---|---|---|---|---|
| 1 | 6 | 5 | Kyle Larson | Hendrick Motorsports | Chevrolet | 15 |
| 2 | 5 | 41 | Ryan Preece | Stewart-Haas Racing | Ford | 15 |
| 3 | 9 | 15 | J. J. Yeley (i) | Rick Ware Racing | Ford | 15 |
| 4 | 1 | 43 | Erik Jones | Legacy Motor Club | Chevrolet | 15 |
| 5 | 8 | 34 | Michael McDowell | Front Row Motorsports | Ford | 15 |
| 6 | 4 | 51 | Matt Crafton (i) | Rick Ware Racing | Ford | 15 |
| 7 | 7 | 17 | Chris Buescher | RFK Racing | Ford | 15 |
| 8 | 3 | 77 | Ty Dillon | Spire Motorsports | Chevrolet | 15 |
| 9 | 2 | 7 | Corey LaJoie | Spire Motorsports | Chevrolet | 15 |
Official race three results

=== Race 4 ===
| Pos | Grid | No | Driver | Team | Manufacturer | Laps |
|---|---|---|---|---|---|---|
| 1 | 1 | 23 | Bubba Wallace | 23XI Racing | Toyota | 15 |
| 2 | 6 | 8 | Kyle Busch | Richard Childress Racing | Chevrolet | 15 |
| 3 | 7 | 2 | Austin Cindric | Team Penske | Ford | 15 |
| 4 | 2 | 13 | Jonathan Davenport | Kaulig Racing | Chevrolet | 15 |
| 5 | 8 | 22 | Joey Logano | Team Penske | Ford | 15 |
| 6 | 4 | 54 | Ty Gibbs (R) | Joe Gibbs Racing | Toyota | 15 |
| 7 | 5 | 19 | Martin Truex Jr. | Joe Gibbs Racing | Toyota | 15 |
| 8 | 9 | 4 | Kevin Harvick | Stewart-Haas Racing | Ford | 15 |
| 9 | 3 | 99 | Daniel Suárez | Trackhouse Racing | Chevrolet | 15 |
Official race four results

=== Starting Lineup ===
| Pos | No. | Driver | Team | Manufacturer |
|---|---|---|---|---|
| 1 | 5 | Kyle Larson | Hendrick Motorsports | Chevrolet |
| 2 | 3 | Austin Dillon | Richard Childress Racing | Chevrolet |
| 3 | 15 | J. J. Yeley (i) | Rick Ware Racing | Ford |
| 4 | 20 | Christopher Bell | Joe Gibbs Racing | Toyota |
| 5 | 8 | Kyle Busch | Richard Childress Racing | Chevrolet |
| 6 | 45 | Tyler Reddick | 23XI Racing | Toyota |
| 7 | 2 | Austin Cindric | Team Penske | Ford |
| 8 | 41 | Ryan Preece | Stewart-Haas Racing | Ford |
| 9 | 12 | Ryan Blaney | Team Penske | Ford |
| 10 | 24 | William Byron | Hendrick Motorsports | Chevrolet |
| 11 | 23 | Bubba Wallace | 23XI Racing | Toyota |
| 12 | 22 | Joey Logano | Team Penske | Ford |
| 13 | 34 | Michael McDowell | Front Row Motorsports | Ford |
| 14 | 14 | Chase Briscoe | Stewart-Haas Racing | Ford |
| 15 | 38 | Todd Gilliland | Front Row Motorsports | Ford |
| 16 | 1 | Ross Chastain | Trackhouse Racing | Chevrolet |
| 17 | 48 | Alex Bowman | Hendrick Motorsports | Chevrolet |
| 18 | 43 | Erik Jones | Legacy Motor Club | Chevrolet |
| 19 | 10 | Aric Almirola | Stewart-Haas Racing | Ford |
| 20 | 21 | Harrison Burton | Wood Brothers Racing | Ford |
| 21 | 13 | Jonathan Davenport | Kaulig Racing | Chevrolet |
| 22 | 47 | Ricky Stenhouse Jr. | JTG Daugherty Racing | Chevrolet |
| 23 | 54 | Ty Gibbs (R) | Joe Gibbs Racing | Toyota |
| 24 | 51 | Matt Crafton (i) | Rick Ware Racing | Ford |
| 25 | 31 | Justin Haley | Kaulig Racing | Chevrolet |
| 26 | 4 | Kevin Harvick | Stewart-Haas Racing | Ford |
| 27 | 19 | Martin Truex Jr. | Joe Gibbs Racing | Toyota |
| 28 | 17 | Chris Buescher | RFK Racing | Ford |
| 29 | 16 | A. J. Allmendinger | Kaulig Racing | Chevrolet |
| 30 | 11 | Denny Hamlin | Joe Gibbs Racing | Toyota |
| 31 | 9 | Josh Berry (i) | Hendrick Motorsports | Chevrolet |
| 32 | 77 | Ty Dillon | Spire Motorsports | Chevrolet |
| 33 | 6 | Brad Keselowski | RFK Racing | Ford |
| 34 | 99 | Daniel Suárez | Trackhouse Racing | Chevrolet |
| 35 | 7 | Corey LaJoie | Spire Motorsports | Chevrolet |
| 36 | 42 | Noah Gragson (R) | Legacy Motor Club | Chevrolet |
| 37 | 78 | B. J. McLeod | Live Fast Motorsports | Chevrolet |
Official starting lineup

== Race ==
=== Stage Results ===
Stage One Laps: 75

| Pos | No | Driver | Team | Manufacturer | Points |
|---|---|---|---|---|---|
| 1 | 5 | Kyle Larson | Hendrick Motorsports | Chevrolet | 10 |
| 2 | 3 | Austin Dillon | Richard Childress Racing | Chevrolet | 9 |
| 3 | 8 | Kyle Busch | Richard Childress Racing | Chevrolet | 8 |
| 4 | 41 | Ryan Preece | Stewart-Haas Racing | Ford | 7 |
| 5 | 12 | Ryan Blaney | Team Penske | Ford | 6 |
| 6 | 20 | Christopher Bell | Joe Gibbs Racing | Toyota | 5 |
| 7 | 14 | Chase Briscoe | Stewart-Haas Racing | Ford | 4 |
| 8 | 45 | Tyler Reddick | 23XI Racing | Toyota | 3 |
| 9 | 31 | Justin Haley | Kaulig Racing | Chevrolet | 2 |
| 10 | 24 | William Byron | Hendrick Motorsports | Chevrolet | 1 |
Official stage one results

Stage Two Laps: 75

| Pos | No | Driver | Team | Manufacturer | Points |
|---|---|---|---|---|---|
| 1 | 45 | Tyler Reddick | 23XI Racing | Toyota | 10 |
| 2 | 3 | Austin Dillon | Richard Childress Racing | Chevrolet | 9 |
| 3 | 5 | Kyle Larson | Hendrick Motorsports | Chevrolet | 8 |
| 4 | 20 | Christopher Bell | Joe Gibbs Racing | Toyota | 7 |
| 5 | 8 | Kyle Busch | Richard Childress Racing | Chevrolet | 6 |
| 6 | 14 | Chase Briscoe | Stewart-Haas Racing | Ford | 5 |
| 7 | 19 | Martin Truex Jr. | Joe Gibbs Racing | Toyota | 4 |
| 8 | 12 | Ryan Blaney | Team Penske | Ford | 3 |
| 9 | 31 | Justin Haley | Kaulig Racing | Chevrolet | 2 |
| 10 | 10 | Aric Almirola | Stewart-Haas Racing | Ford | 1 |
Official stage two results

=== Final Stage Results ===
Stage Three Laps: 100

| Pos | Grid | No | Driver | Team | Manufacturer | Laps | Points |
|---|---|---|---|---|---|---|---|
| 1 | 4 | 20 | Christopher Bell | Joe Gibbs Racing | Toyota | 250 | 52 |
| 2 | 6 | 45 | Tyler Reddick | 23XI Racing | Toyota | 250 | 48 |
| 3 | 2 | 3 | Austin Dillon | Richard Childress Racing | Chevrolet | 250 | 52 |
| 4 | 22 | 47 | Ricky Stenhouse Jr. | JTG Daugherty Racing | Chevrolet | 250 | 33 |
| 5 | 14 | 14 | Chase Briscoe | Stewart-Haas Racing | Ford | 250 | 41 |
| 6 | 25 | 31 | Justin Haley | Kaulig Racing | Chevrolet | 250 | 35 |
| 7 | 27 | 19 | Martin Truex Jr. | Joe Gibbs Racing | Toyota | 250 | 34 |
| 8 | 15 | 38 | Todd Gilliland | Front Row Motorsports | Ford | 250 | 29 |
| 9 | 26 | 4 | Kevin Harvick | Stewart-Haas Racing | Ford | 250 | 28 |
| 10 | 23 | 54 | Ty Gibbs (R) | Joe Gibbs Racing | Toyota | 250 | 27 |
| 11 | 13 | 34 | Michael McDowell | Front Row Motorsports | Ford | 250 | 26 |
| 12 | 11 | 23 | Bubba Wallace | 23XI Racing | Toyota | 250 | 25 |
| 13 | 10 | 24 | William Byron | Hendrick Motorsports | Chevrolet | 250 | 25 |
| 14 | 18 | 43 | Erik Jones | Legacy Motor Club | Chevrolet | 250 | 23 |
| 15 | 20 | 21 | Harrison Burton | Wood Brothers Racing | Ford | 250 | 22 |
| 16 | 29 | 16 | A. J. Allmendinger | Kaulig Racing | Chevrolet | 250 | 21 |
| 17 | 33 | 6 | Brad Keselowski | RFK Racing | Ford | 250 | 20 |
| 18 | 28 | 17 | Chris Buescher | RFK Racing | Ford | 250 | 19 |
| 19 | 7 | 2 | Austin Cindric | Team Penske | Ford | 250 | 18 |
| 20 | 3 | 15 | J. J. Yeley (i) | Rick Ware Racing | Ford | 250 | 0 |
| 21 | 32 | 77 | Ty Dillon | Spire Motorsports | Chevrolet | 250 | 16 |
| 22 | 30 | 11 | Denny Hamlin | Joe Gibbs Racing | Toyota | 250 | 15 |
| 23 | 9 | 12 | Ryan Blaney | Team Penske | Ford | 250 | 23 |
| 24 | 8 | 41 | Ryan Preece | Stewart-Haas Racing | Ford | 250 | 20 |
| 25 | 34 | 99 | Daniel Suárez | Trackhouse Racing | Chevrolet | 250 | 12 |
| 26 | 37 | 78 | B. J. McLeod | Live Fast Motorsports | Chevrolet | 250 | 11 |
| 27 | 31 | 9 | Josh Berry (i) | Hendrick Motorsports | Chevrolet | 250 | 0 |
| 28 | 16 | 1 | Ross Chastain | Trackhouse Racing | Chevrolet | 249 | 9 |
| 29 | 17 | 48 | Alex Bowman | Hendrick Motorsports | Chevrolet | 248 | 8 |
| 30 | 35 | 7 | Corey LaJoie | Spire Motorsports | Chevrolet | 247 | 7 |
| 31 | 19 | 10 | Aric Almirola | Stewart-Haas Racing | Ford | 240 | 7 |
| 32 | 5 | 8 | Kyle Busch | Richard Childress Racing | Chevrolet | 236 | 19 |
| 33 | 36 | 42 | Noah Gragson (R) | Legacy Motor Club | Chevrolet | 205 | 4 |
| 34 | 24 | 51 | Matt Crafton (i) | Rick Ware Racing | Ford | 185 | 0 |
| 35 | 1 | 5 | Kyle Larson | Hendrick Motorsports | Chevrolet | 177 | 20 |
| 36 | 21 | 13 | Jonathan Davenport | Kaulig Racing | Chevrolet | 176 | 1 |
| 37 | 12 | 22 | Joey Logano | Team Penske | Ford | 96 | 1 |
Official race results

=== Race statistics ===
- Lead changes: 4 among 4 different drivers
- Cautions/Laps: 14 for 71 laps
- Red flags: 0
- Time of race: 2 hours, 40 minutes and 40 seconds
- Average speed: 46.68 miles per hour (75.12 km/h)

== Media ==
=== Television ===
The Food City Dirt Race was carried by Fox in the United States. Mike Joy, Clint Bowyer and three-time NASCAR Cup Series champion and co-owner of Stewart-Haas Racing Tony Stewart called the race from the broadcast booth. Jamie Little, Regan Smith and Josh Sims handled pit road for the television side. Larry McReynolds provided insight from the Fox Sports studio in Charlotte.

Fox
| Booth announcers | Pit reporters | In-race analyst |
|---|---|---|
| Lap-by-lap: Mike Joy; Color-commentator: Clint Bowyer; Color-commentator: Tony Stewart | Jamie Little; Regan Smith; Josh Sims | Larry McReynolds |

=== Radio ===
PRN had the radio call for the race which was simulcasted on Sirius XM NASCAR Radio. Doug Rice and Mark Garrow called the race in the booth when the field raced down the frontstretch. Rob Albright called the race from atop the turn 3 suites when the field raced down the backstretch. Brad Gillie, Brett McMillan, Matt Prieur, Lenny Batycki and Heather Debeaux covered the action on pit lane for PRN.

PRN
| Booth announcers | Turn announcers | Pit reporters |
|---|---|---|
| Lead announcer: Doug Rice; Announcer: Mark Garrow | Backstretch: Rob Albright | Brad Gillie; Brett McMillan; Matt Prieur; Lenny Batycki; Heather Debeaux |

== Standings after the race ==
Drivers' Championship standings

| | Pos | Driver | Points |
|---|---|---|---|
| 1 | 1 | Christopher Bell | 281 |
| 1 | 2 | Ross Chastain | 268 (–13) |
| | 3 | Kevin Harvick | 255 (–26) |
| | 4 | Kyle Larson | 242 (–39) |
| 7 | 5 | Tyler Reddick | 235 (–46) |
| | 6 | Kyle Busch | 234 (–47) |
| 1 | 7 | Martin Truex Jr. | 232 (–49) |
| 3 | 8 | Joey Logano | 223 (–58) |
| | 9 | Brad Keselowski | 216 (–65) |
| | 10 | Ryan Blaney | 211 (–70) |
| 4 | 11 | Alex Bowman | 211 (–70) |
| 1 | 12 | Denny Hamlin | 203 (–78) |
| 3 | 13 | Ricky Stenhouse Jr. | 194 (–87) |
| | 14 | William Byron | 193 (–88) |
| 2 | 15 | Austin Cindric | 193 (–88) |
| 1 | 16 | Chris Buescher | 183 (–98) |
Official driver's standings

Manufacturers' Championship standings

| Pos | Manufacturer | Points |
|---|---|---|
| 1 | Chevrolet | 302 |
| 2 | Toyota | 279 (–23) |
| 3 | Ford | 268 (–34) |

- Note: Only the first 16 positions are included for the driver standings.

== Notes ==
| Previous race: 2023 Toyota Owners 400 | NASCAR Cup Series; 2023 season | Next race: 2023 NOCO 400 |
