= Virginia Motor Speedway =

Dirt Oval Motor-Raceway located in Jamaica, Virginia

Coordinates: 37.704569°N 76.691651°W

Virginia Motor Speedway was a 1/2-mile (0.80 km) semi-banked dirt oval raceway located in Jamaica, Virginia. VMS features a clay racing surface with 14 degree banking in both corners and 4 degrees on the front and back stretch. Races are held on Saturday. Regular events include Steel Block Late Models, Modifieds, Sportsman, and Limited Stock. VMS has a seating capacity of 8,000 in the main grandstands.

== Special events ==
In addition to weekly shows, VMS also hosts various regional and national touring series as well as special events. During the last weekend of September, VMS hosts the Fall Classic Event, currently in its 39th year. VMS also features races from the following series: World of Outlaws Late Model Series, World of Outlaws, Lucas Oil Late Model Dirt Series, Carolina Clash, and Steel Block Bandits.
