= Josh Richards (racing driver) =

American racing driver (born 1988)

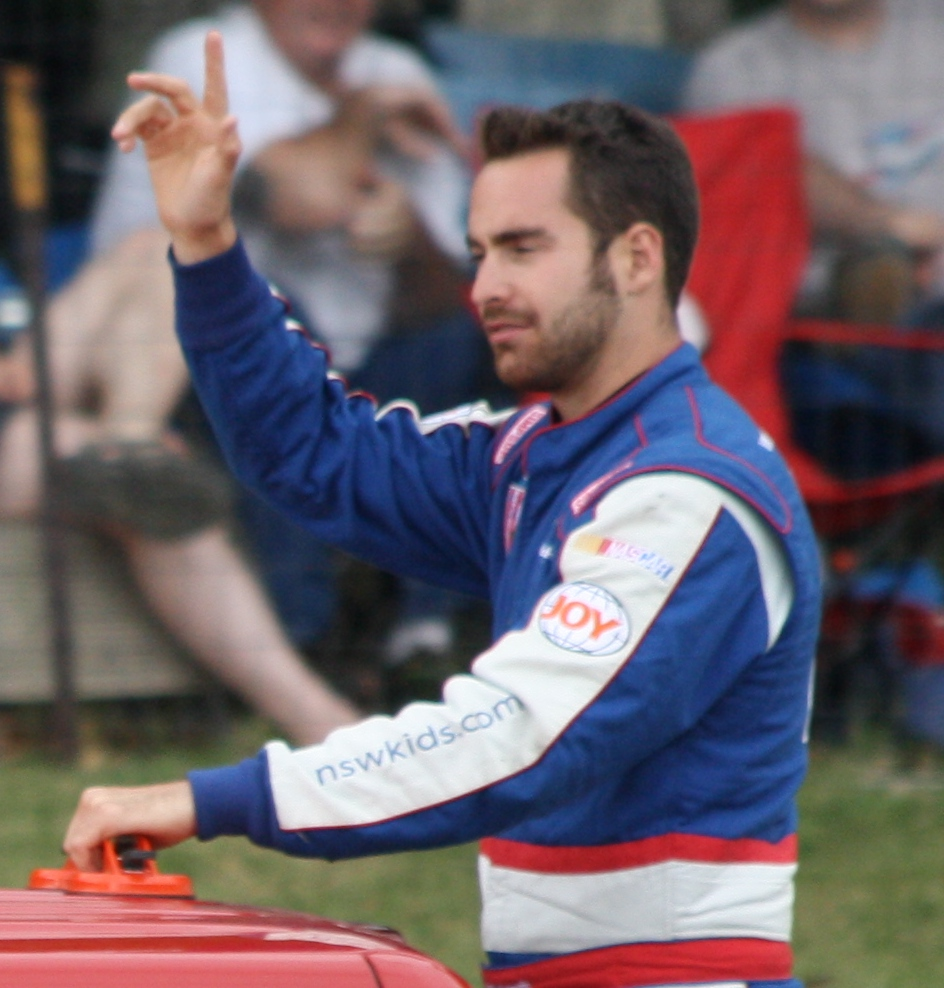
- Richards in 2012
- Born: Joshua Richards; March 22, 1988 (age 38) Shinnston, West Virginia, U.S.

World of Outlaws Late Model Series career
- Debut season: 2004
- Current team: Boom Briggs Racing
- Car number: 1R
- Starts: 474
- Championships: 2009, 2010, 2013, 2016
- Wins: 78
- Poles: 19
- Best finish: 1st in 2009, 2010, 2013, 2016
- Finished last season: 39th (2021)

Lucas Oil Late Model Dirt Series career
- Debut season: 2004
- Current team: Boom Briggs Racing
- Car number: 1R
- Starts: 326
- Championships: 2017
- Wins: 33
- Poles: 24
- Best finish: 1st in 2017
- Finished last season: 8th (2021)

NASCAR O'Reilly Auto Parts Series career
- 14 races run over 1 year
- 2012 position: 27th
- Best finish: 27th (2012)
- First race: 2012 Aaron's 312 (Talladega)
- Last race: 2012 Kentucky 300 (Kentucky)
Wins	Top tens	Poles
0	0	0

NASCAR FedEx Freight Truck Series career
- 9 races run over 2 years
- Best finish: 30th (2011)
- First race: 2011 UNOH 225 (Kentucky)
- Last race: 2012 Kroger 200 (Martinsville)
Wins	Top tens	Poles
0	0	0
- Statistics up to date as of April 3, 2022.

Joshua Richards (born March 22, 1988) is an American former professional stock car racing driver from Shinnston, West Virginia. He last competed full-time in the World of Outlaws Late Model Series, in the No. 1R Rocket Chassis for Boom Briggs Racing, where he had been a champion in 2009, 2010, 2013, and 2016. Richards was also a champion in the Lucas Oil Late Model Dirt Series in 2017.

Richards has also raced on asphalt. He competed in the ARCA Racing Series, NASCAR K&N Pro Series East, NASCAR Camping World Truck Series and peaked with 14 starts in the 2012 NASCAR Nationwide Series.

== Racing career ==
=== NASCAR and ARCA ===
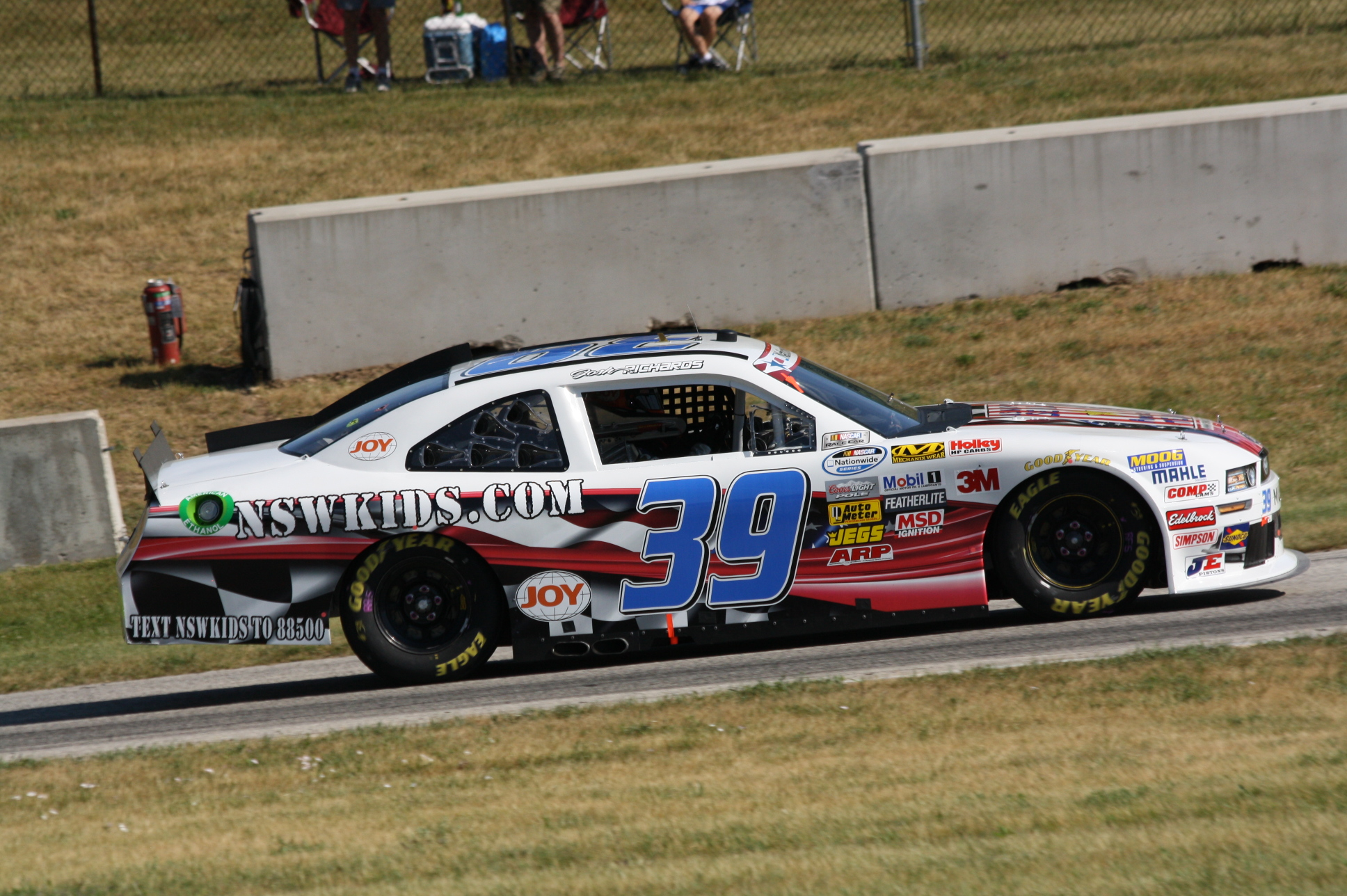
Richards' 2012 Xfinity car at Road America

Richards raced in eight NASCAR Truck races in 2011 with a top finish of thirteenth at Talladega. In 2012, he raced in one Truck race and fourteen Nationwide races. His best Nationwide finish was a sixteenth-place finish at Daytona. He made a few dirt late model starts in 2012, and switch back to late models in 2013 after he had no stock car ride.

=== Dirt track racing ===
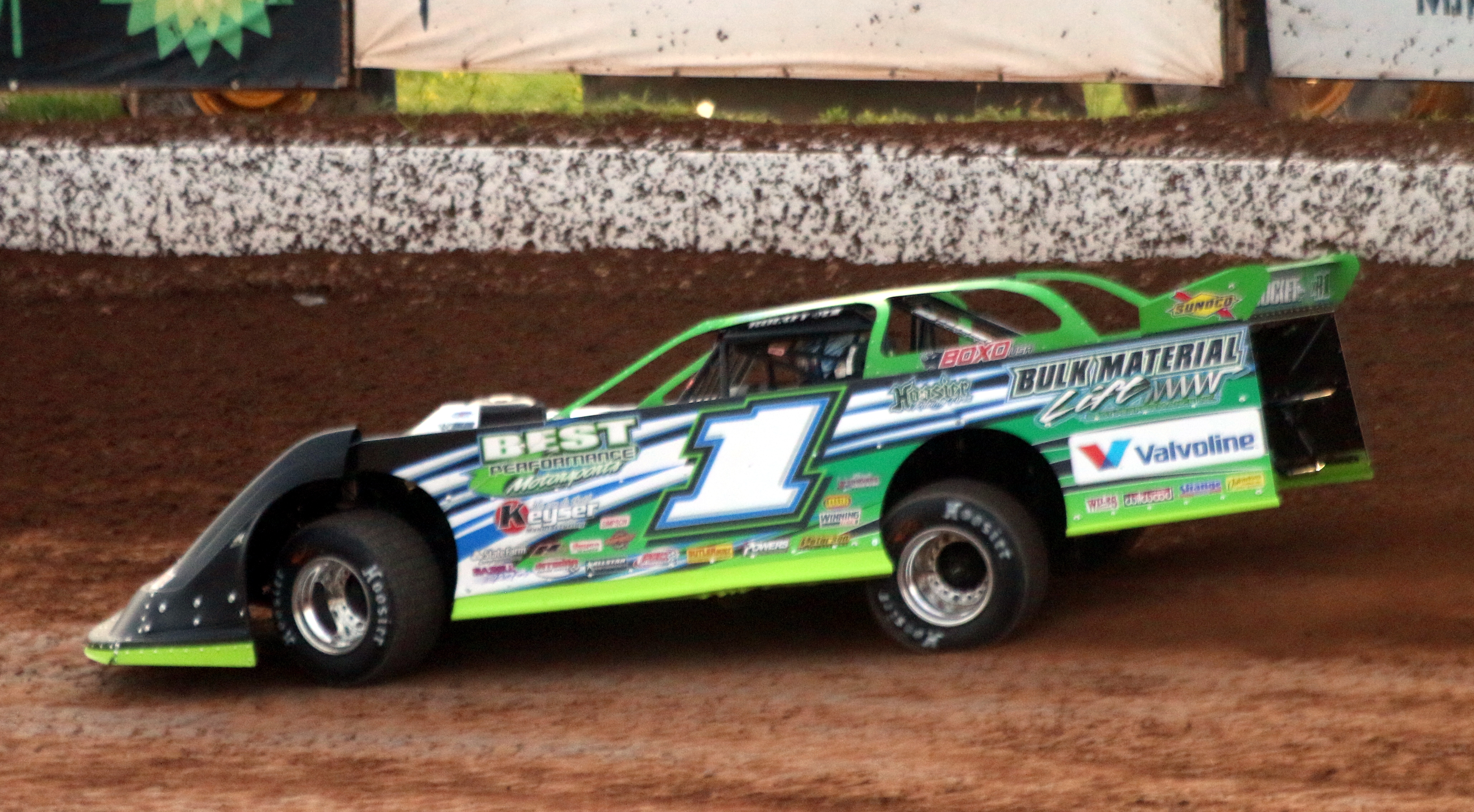
2018 Lucas Oil Late Model

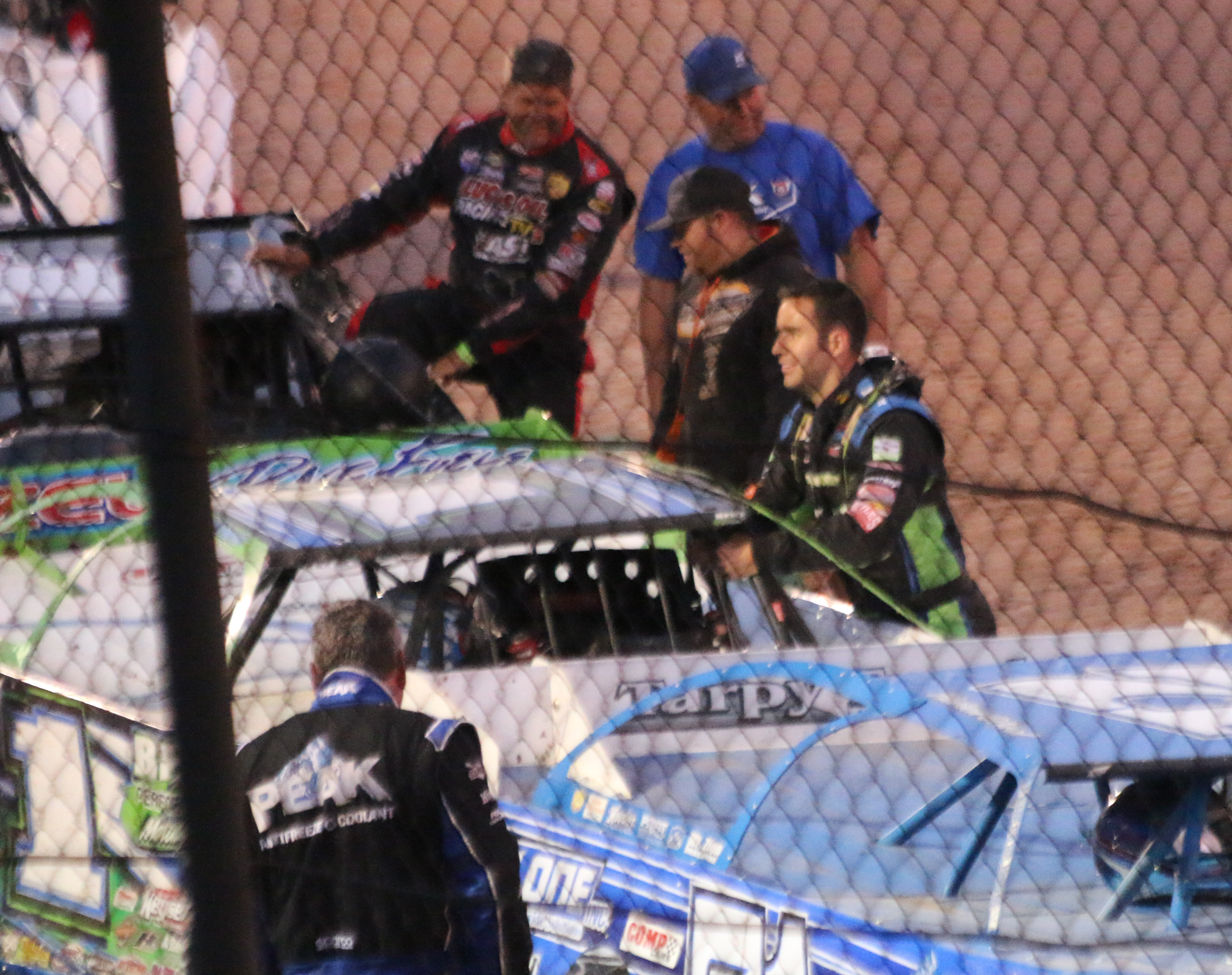
Richards emerging from his 2018 Late Model

Richards raced the house car for his father's Rocket Chassis team in national dirt late model series for eleven years until 2016. He won the World of Outlaws Late Model Series in 2009, 2010, and 2013. He raced for Best Performance Motorsports in 2016 and won the World of Outlaws championship in a Rocket chassis as well as the 2017 Lucas Oil championship. He switched to Clint Bowyer Racing in 2019, remaining in a Rocket chassis. As of 2019, Richards has over 100 wins in Lucas Oil and World of Outlaws competition. Richards won his third dirt late model race of 2020 at Eldora Speedway by winning the $10,000 opening night of the Intercontinental Classic against a field of invitation-only drivers.

== Motorsports career results ==
=== NASCAR ===
(key) (Bold – Pole position awarded by qualifying time. Italics – Pole position earned by points standings or practice time. * – Most laps led.)

==== Nationwide Series ====
NASCAR Nationwide Series results
Year	Team	No.	Make	1	2	3	4	5	6	7	8	9	10	11	12	13	14	15	16	17	18	19	20	21	22	23	24	25	26	27	28	29	30	31	32	33	NNSC	Pts	Ref
2012	Go Green Racing	39	Ford	DAY	PHO	LVS	BRI	CAL	TEX	RCH	TAL; 30	DAR; 25	IOW; 34	CLT; 34	DOV; 22	MCH; 30	ROA; 31	KEN; 20	DAY; 16	NHA; 24	CHI; 20	IND				BRI; 19	ATL	RCH	CHI	KEN; 21	DOV	CLT	KAN	TEX	PHO	HOM	27th	256	
2012	Randy Hill Racing	08	Ford																				IOW; 34	GLN	CGV												27th	256	

==== Camping World Truck Series ====
NASCAR Camping World Truck Series results
Year	Team	No.	Make	1	2	3	4	5	6	7	8	9	10	11	12	13	14	15	16	17	18	19	20	21	22	23	24	25	NCWTC	Pts	Ref
2011	Kyle Busch Motorsports	15	Toyota	DAY	PHO	DAR	MAR	NSH	DOV	CLT	KAN	TEX	KEN; 29	IOW						ATL; 21	CHI	NHA							30th	166	
2011	Kyle Busch Motorsports	18	Toyota												NSH; 22	IRP; 22	POC	MCH											30th	166	
2011	Kyle Busch Motorsports	51	Toyota																BRI; 17				KEN; 34	LVS	TAL; 13	MAR; 28	TEX	HOM	30th	166	
2012	Wauters Motorsports	5	Ford	DAY	MAR	CAR	KAN	CLT	DOV	TEX	KEN	IOW	CHI	POC	MCH	BRI	ATL	IOW	KEN	LVS	TAL	MAR; 17	TEX	PHO	HOM				98th	0^{1}	

^{1} Ineligible for series points

==== K&N Pro Series East ====
NASCAR K&N Pro Series East results
Year	Team	No.	Make	1	2	3	4	5	6	7	8	9	10	11	NKNPSEC	Pts	Ref
2009	Ken Schrader Racing	52	Chevy	GRE; 4	TRI	IOW	SBO	GLN	NHA	TMP	ADI	LRP			32nd	360	
2009	Dave Davis Motorsports	03	Chevy										NHA; 18		32nd	360	
2009	Dave Davis Motorsports	03	Dodge											DOV; 24	32nd	360	
2010	Dave Davis Motorsports	1	Chevy	GRE	SBO	IOW; 6	MAR; 28	NHA	LRP	LEE	JFC	NHA	DOV		39th	221	

=== ARCA Racing Series ===
(key) (Bold – Pole position awarded by qualifying time. Italics – Pole position earned by points standings or practice time. * – Most laps led.)

ARCA Racing Series results
Year	Team	No.	Make	1	2	3	4	5	6	7	8	9	10	11	12	13	14	15	16	17	18	19	20	21	22	23	ARSC	Pts	Ref
2007	Tony Stewart Racing	20	Chevy	DAY	USA	NSH	SLM	KAN	WIN	KEN	TOL	IOW	POC	MCH	BLN	KEN	POC	NSH	ISF	MIL	GTW	DSF; 3	CHI	SLM	TAL	TOL	102nd	215	
2009	Venturini Motorsports	25	Chevy	DAY	SLM	CAR	TAL	KEN	TOL	POC	MCH	MFD	IOW	KEN; 32	BLN	POC	ISF	CHI	TOL								120th	165	
2009	Venturini Motorsports	15	Chevy																	DSF; 27	NJE	SLM	KAN	CAR			120th	165	
2010	Ken Schrader Racing	99	Chevy	DAY; 42	PBE	SLM	TEX	TAL	TOL	POC																	76th	245	
2010	RAB Racing	99	Ford								MCH; 36	IOW															76th	245	
2010	Venturini Motorsports	55	Chevy										MFD; 13	POC	BLN	NJE	ISF	CHI	DSF	TOL	SLM	KAN	CAR				76th	245	
2011	Venturini Motorsports	25	Toyota	DAY	TAL	SLM	TOL	NJE	**CHI**; 3	POC																	36th	615	
2011	Venturini Motorsports	25	Chevy														ISF; 9	MAD	DSF	SLM	KAN	TOL					36th	615	
2011	Venturini Motorsports	15	Toyota								MCH; 10	WIN	BLN	IOW	IRP	POC											36th	615	
