= World 100 =

Coordinates: 40°19′6.43″N 84°38′1.79″W

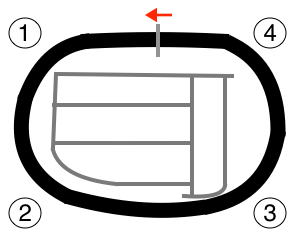
- Venue: Eldora Speedway
- Location: Rossburg, Ohio
- First race: 1971
- Laps: 100
- Most wins (driver): Billy Moyer (6)

Circuit information
- Surface: Clay
- Length: 0.5 mi (0.80 km)

The World 100 is a 100-lap dirt late model racing event held every year since 1971 at the 1/2 mile Eldora Speedway in Rossburg, Ohio. It is considered by many race fans to be the most prestigious dirt late model event in the United States. The event is held on the weekend following Labor Day in mid September. In 1971 the winner received $3,000, and each year since then, the winner's purse has been raised by $1,000 (except in 2020, when it was changed to comply with modified format regulations). The 2023 edition has a winner's prize of $56,000. In addition, the winning driver and owner earn a pair of coveted globed trophies. In 2025, the winner’s prize was increased to $72,000 for the track’s 72nd Anniversary. In 2026, the winner’s prize was increased again to $100,000 to match The Dirt Late Dream(the other dirt late model crown jewel event held at the track).

== Qualifying ==
Qualifying for the World 100 feature race is a 3-day event. Typically, the Thursday and Friday before the World 100 is filled with the prototypical event schedule (hot laps, heat races, B-Main/Last Chance Qualifier, Feature event). Both Thursday and Friday have Twin Features. Drivers earn points based on their performances the first two days. On Saturday (the day of the World 100), drivers are seeded into their heat races based on the points accumulated through the previous two days. How they finish in their heat races immediately determines where the predetermined number of qualifying drivers will start. A random draw will then invert a selected number of qualifiers starting from first to the said position.

This process saw Hudson O'Neal, son of legendary driver Don O'Neal, become the youngest driver to start on the pole at 17-years-old in 2017.

In 2018, both Friday and Saturday racing were rained out and moved from September to Columbus Day weekend in October. The results from Thursday were carried over to the rain date, and drivers ran Friday's schedule the morning of the World 100, essentially making the day a double-header. Tim McCreadie won the marathon event, becoming the first driver from New York to win the World 100.

In 2020, because of Ohio regulations during the pandemic lockdown, where no races at the track during the entire season could admit spectators, only three events were held -- all were repurposed versions of their major events. The World 100 became the Intercontinental Classic, which was reduced to 67 laps and purse reduced as a result of being behind closed doors. It became a pay-per-view event with a flat $50,000 to win (reduced from 2019).

Two World 100 races were run in 2021 after the Intercontinental Classic. Johnathan Davenport won the 50th while Brandon Overton won the 51st.

== Winners ==
- 1971: Bruce Gould, Milford, Ohio.
- 1972: Verlin Eaker, Cedar Rapids, Iowa;
- 1973: Floyd Gilbert, Lockland, Ohio;
- 1974: Ed Sanger, Waterloo, Iowa;
- 1975: Joe Merryfield, Des Moines, Iowa;
- 1976: Charlie Hughes, Dalton, Ga.;
- 1977: Doug Kenimer, Dalton, Ga.;
- 1978: Ken Walton, Viola, Iowa;
- 1979: Larry Moore, Dayton, Ohio;
- 1980: Charlie Swartz, Lucasville, Ohio;
- 1981: Larry Moore, Dayton, Ohio;
- 1982: Mike Duvall, Gaffney, S.C.;
- 1983: Jeff Purvis, Clarksville, Tenn.;
- 1984: Jeff Purvis, Clarksville, Tenn.;
- 1985: Larry Moore, Dayton, Ohio;
- 1986: Jeff Purvis, Clarksville, Tenn.;
- 1987: Randy Boggs, Grayson, Ky.;
- 1988: Scott Bloomquist, Mooresburg, Tenn.;
- 1989: Donnie Moran, Frazeysburg, Ohio;
- 1990: Scott Bloomquist, Mooresburg, Tenn.;
- 1991: Billy Moyer, Batesville, Ark.;
- 1992: Donnie Moran, Frazeysburg, Ohio;
- 1993: Billy Moyer, Batesville, Ark.;
- 1994: Billy Moyer, Batesville, Ark.;
- 1995: Jack Boggs, Grayson, Ky.;
- 1996: Donnie Moran, Dresden, Ohio;
- 1997: Donnie Moran, Dresden, Ohio;
- 1998: Billy Moyer, Batesville, Ark.;
- 1999: Steve Francis, Ashland, Ky.;
- 2000: Billy Moyer, Batesville, Ark.;
- 2001: Scott Bloomquist, Mooresburg, Tenn.;
- 2002: Brian Birkhofer, Muscatine, Iowa;
- 2003: Dan Schlieper, Pewaukee, Wis.;
- 2004: Chub Frank, Bear Lake, Pa.;
- 2005: Dale McDowell, Rossville, Ga.;
- 2006: Earl Pearson Jr., Jacksonville, Fla.;
- 2007: Jimmy Owens, Newport, Tenn.;
- 2008: Shane Clanton, Locust Grove, Ga.;
- 2009: Bart Hartman, Zanesville, Ohio;
- 2010: Billy Moyer, Batesville, Ark.;
- 2011: Jimmy Owens, Newport, Tenn.;
- 2012: Brian Birkhofer, Muscatine, Iowa;
- 2013: John Blankenship, Williamson, W.Va.;
- 2014: Scott Bloomquist, Mooresburg, Tenn.;
- 2015: Jonathan Davenport, Blairsville, Ga.;
- 2016: Bobby Pierce, Oakwood, Ill.;
- 2017: Jonathan Davenport, Blairsville, Ga.;
- 2018: Tim McCreadie, Watertown, NY.;
- 2019: Jonathan Davenport, Blairsville, Ga.;
- 2020 (Intercontinental Classic): Jonathan Davenport, Blairsville, Ga.;
- 2021 (Thu, 51st edition): Brandon Overton, Evans, Ga.
- 2021 (Sat, 50th edition): Jonathan Davenport, Blairsville, Ga.;
- 2022 Jonathan Davenport, Blairsville, Ga.;
- 2023 Hudson O'Neal, Martinsville, IN;
- 2024 Bobby Pierce, Oakwood, Ill.;
- 2025 Ricky Thornton Jr., Indianola, IA.;
- 2026 Nick Hoffman, Mooresville NC;
