= Tim McCreadie =

American racing driver (born 1974)

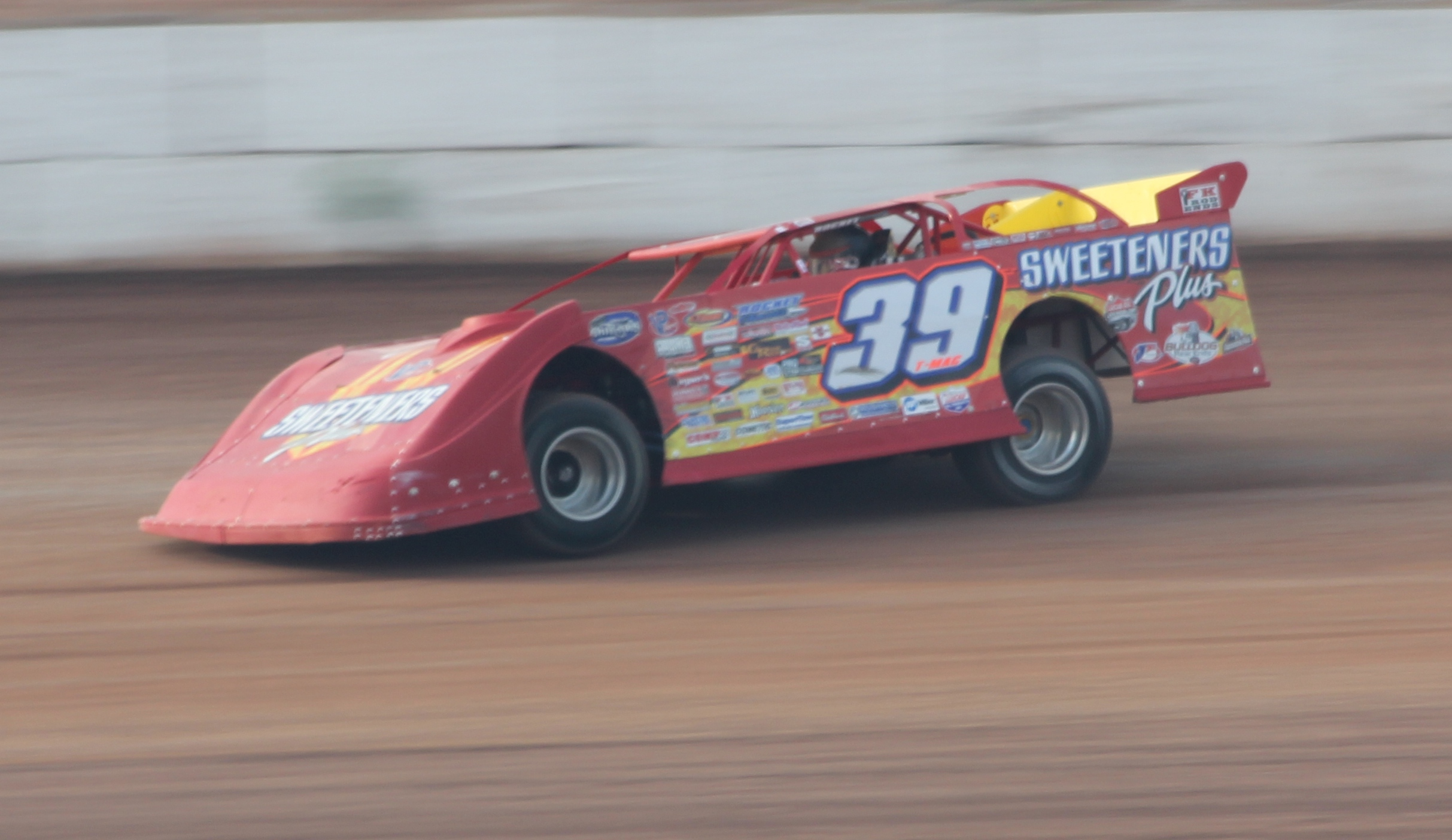
- 2015 at Oshkosh
- Born: Timothy R. McCreadie; April 12, 1974 (age 52) Watertown, New York, U.S.

Late model career
- Debut season: 2004
- Car number: 39,9,1
- Championships: 3
- Wins: 112

Previous series
- 1994-present Car number Wins: Modified racing 39,56,94; 91

Championship titles
- 2023 DIRTcar Nationals Dirt Late Model Champion; 2021, 2022 Lucas Oil Late Model Dirt Series National Champion; 2018 DIRTcar Nationals SDS Big Block Modified Champion; 2006 World of Outlaws Late Model Series National Champion

Awards
- 1997 Super DIRTcar Series Rookie of the Year; 2004 World of Outlaws Late Model Rookie of the Year; 2006 EMPA Al Holbert National Driver of the Year
- Achievements: 2024, 2008 Topless 100; 2022,2019 Firecracker 100; 2020,2017 North-South 100; 2018 World 100; 2017 Silver Dollar Nationals; 2014 Prairie Dirt Classic; 2013 USA Nationals; 2012 Super Dirt Week 358-Modified Championship; 2008 Late Model Knoxville Nationals; 2006 Chili Bowl

NASCAR O'Reilly Auto Parts Series career
- 6 races run over 1 year
- Best finish: 65th (2007)
- First race: 2007 AT&T 250 (Milwaukee)
- Last race: 2007 Sam's Town 250 (Memphis)
Wins	Top tens	Poles
0	0	0

ARCA Menards Series career
- 2 races run over 1 year
Wins	Top tens	Poles
0	1	0

ARCA Menards Series East career
- 2 races run over 1 year
Wins	Top tens	Poles
0	1	0

ARCA Menards Series West career
- 3 races run over 1 year
Wins	Top tens	Poles
0	2	0
- Statistics up to date as of October 18, 2026.

Tim McCreadie (born April 12, 1974) is an American Dirt Late Model racing driver. He is the 2021 and 2022 Lucas Oil Late Model Dirt Series Champion. In 2007 he ran a partial schedule in the NASCAR West Series, ARCA RE/MAX Series, NASCAR Busch Series, and World of Outlaws Late Model Series.

== Racing career ==
=== Early career ===
As a youth, McCreadie raced go karts in the Thousand Island region of New York, and advanced to small block modifieds putting a 358 Mod together with his neighborhood go-karting buddies. In 2001, he joined with car owner John Finch, which began a two-year rout with 24 victories at nine tracks including ten Super DIRT Series wins and the 2001 Weedsport Speedway title. McCreadie then piloted the Carl Myers’ Sweeteners Plus modified until the team moved full time to the Late Models in 2005.

=== Late models ===
McCreadie competed on a part time schedule with the World of Outlaw Late Models Series, capturing the 2004 Rookie of the Year title. He won nine times his first full season in a full-fendered car. McCreadie then won the 2006 Chili Bowl as a driver for Australian speedway team Hawk Racing, as well as the 2006 World of Outlaws Late Model Series Championship.

McCreadie was voted the 2006 Al Holbert Memorial National Driver of the Year by the Eastern Motorsport Press Association.

=== Asphalt racing ===
McCreadie signed a development deal with Richard Childress Racing in 2007, racing six events in the NASCAR Nationwide Series. He earned top-15s at Gateway International Raceway and O'Reilly Raceway Park as was thought by many to be one of the next up-and-comers in the sport. He tested the RCR NNS car at Daytona International Speedway and topped the speed charts early on. Despite these successes, however, sponsorship could not be found for his team and he and Richard Childress Racing agreed to part ways.

=== Return to dirt racing ===
In 2008, McCreadie won the Topless 100 Late Model Race, leading all 100 laps, and won the event for a second time in 2024. On September 27, 2008, he won the best race of his career the 5th Annual Late Model Knoxville Nationals, taking home $40,000. The 2008 season also saw him earn a win at the Jackson 100, beating some of the biggest name in the sport of auto racing, as well as trying his hand in the commentary booth as an analyst for Speed TV for the Rite Aid 200 at the Syracuse Mile.

In January 2009, McCreadie severely injured his back at the 2009 Chili Bowl race after a serious midget car roll over. Tim broke one vertebra, with floating pieces in his back.

McCreadie resumed racing in 2010 and captured the Eastern States 200" at Orange County Fair Speedway in New York.

In 2012, McCreadie won the Gander Mountain 150 for DIRTCar 358 Modifieds at the Syracuse Mile.

In 2013, McCreadie won the "USA Nationals" at the Cedar Lake Speedway in New Richmond, Wisconsin worth $50,000.

In 2014, McCreadie won the "Prairie Dirt Classic" at the Fairbury American Legion Speedway in Fairbury, Illinois worth $25,000.

In 2016, McCreadie joined the Lucas Oil Late Model Dirt Series full-time for the first time in his career.

In 2017, McCreadie won the "Silver Dollar Nationals" at the I-80 Speedway in Greenwood, Nebraska worth $53,000. He also won the "North-South 100" at the Florence Speedway in Union, Kentucky worth $50,000, and repeated in 2020.

In 2018, McCreadie became the first driver from New York state to win the World 100.

In 2019, McCreadie won the Firecracker 100 at the Lernerville Speedway in Sarver, PA driving the K&L Rumley Enterprises #6 Longhorn Chassis. In 2022 he won the Firecracker 100 again for the second time.

In 2026, McCreadie was inducted into the Northeast Dirt Modified Hall of Fame.

== Family ==
Tim is the son of Bob and Sandy McCreadie, and has two siblings, Tyne and Jordan. His father is the legendary modified driver "Barefoot" Bob McCreadie, an inductee to the Lowe's Motor Speedway Walk of Fame, the Dirt Motorsports Northeast Hall of Fame, and the Eastern Motorsport Press Association Hall of Fame. Tim McCreadie's nickname is "T-Mac".

== Motorsports career results ==
=== NASCAR ===
(key) (Bold – Pole position awarded by qualifying time. Italics – Pole position earned by points standings or practice time. * – Most laps led.)

==== Busch Series ====
NASCAR Busch Series results
Year	Team	No.	Make	1	2	3	4	5	6	7	8	9	10	11	12	13	14	15	16	17	18	19	20	21	22	23	24	25	26	27	28	29	30	31	32	33	34	35	NBSC	Pts	Ref
2007	Richard Childress Racing	21	Chevy	DAY	CAL	MXC	LVS	ATL	BRI	NSH	TEX	PHO	TAL	RCH	DAR	CLT	DOV	NSH	KEN	MLW; 28	NHA	DAY	CHI	GTY; 14	IRP; 12	CGV	GLN	MCH	BRI	CAL	RCH; 32	DOV; 24	KAN	CLT	MEM; 16	TEX	PHO	HOM	65th	600	

==== Busch East Series ====
NASCAR Busch East Series results
Year	Team	No.	Make	1	2	3	4	5	6	7	8	9	10	11	12	13	NBEC	Pts	Ref
2007	Richard Childress Racing with Elain Skaff	33	Chevy	GRE	ELK	IOW	SBO	STA	NHA; 36	TMP	NSH	ADI	LRP	MFD	NHA		45th	210	
2007	Richard Childress Racing with Marsh Racing	31	Chevy													DOV; 5	45th	210	

==== West Series ====
NASCAR West Series results
Year	Team	No.	Make	1	2	3	4	5	6	7	8	9	10	11	12	13	Pos.	Pts	Ref
2007	Richard Childress Racing with Jim Offenbach	31	Chevy	CTS	PHO; 11	AMP	ELK	IOW; 7	CNS	SON	DCS	IRW; 7	MMP	EVG	CSR	AMP	31st	422	

=== ARCA Re/Max Series ===
(key) (Bold – Pole position awarded by qualifying time. Italics – Pole position earned by points standings or practice time. * – Most laps led.)

ARCA Re/Max Series results
Year	Team	No.	Make	1	2	3	4	5	6	7	8	9	10	11	12	13	14	15	16	17	18	19	20	21	22	23	ARSC	Pts	Ref
2007	Richard Childress Racing	31	Chevy	DAY	USA	NSH	SLM	KAN	WIN	KEN	TOL	IOW	POC	MCH; 4	BLN	KEN	POC	NSH	ISF	MIL	GTW	DSF	CHI	SLM	TAL; 15	TOL	73rd	365	
