= Greenwood, Nebraska =

- Village
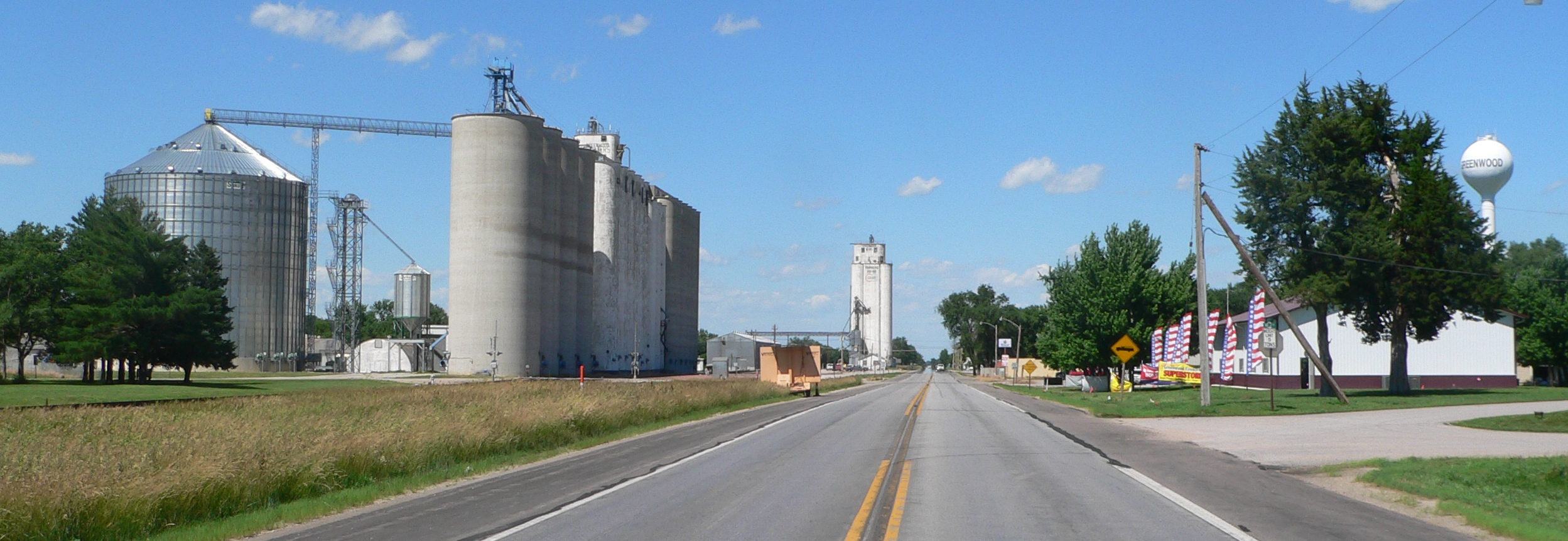
- Greenwood, view from southwest on U.S. Highway 6 (2013)

- Location of Greenwood, Nebraska
- Coordinates: 40°57′41″N 96°26′36″W
- Country: United States
- State: Nebraska
- County: Cass

Area
  - Total: 0.41 sq mi (1.07 km^{2})
  - Land: 0.41 sq mi (1.07 km^{2})
  - Water: 0 sq mi (0.00 km^{2})
- Elevation: 1,129 ft (344 m)

Population (2020)
  - Total: 595
  - Density: 1,446.2/sq mi (558.39/km^{2})
- Time zone: UTC-6 (Central (CST))
  - Summer (DST): UTC-5 (CDT)
- ZIP code: 68366
- Area code: 402
- FIPS code: 31-20190
- GNIS feature ID: 2398208
- Website: http://www.GreenwoodNebraska.com

Greenwood is a village in northwest Cass County, Nebraska, United States. The population was 595 at the 2020 census.

== History ==
Greenwood was founded circa 1869 when the Burlington & Missouri River Railroad was extended to that point. The community was named after Silas Greenwood, a pioneer settler.

== Geography ==
According to the United States Census Bureau, the village has a total area of 0.41 square miles (1.06 km^{2}), all land.

== Demographics ==
Historical population
Census	Pop.	Note	%±
1880	179		—
1890	495		176.5%
1900	516		4.2%
1910	387		−25.0%
1920	340		−12.1%
1930	404		18.8%
1940	350		−13.4%
1950	364		4.0%
1960	403		10.7%
1970	506		25.6%
1980	587		16.0%
1990	531		−9.5%
2000	544		2.4%
2010	568		4.4%
2020	595		4.8%
U.S. Decennial Census

=== 2010 census ===
As of the census of 2010, there were 568 people, 223 households, and 155 families living in the village. The population density was 1,385.4 inhabitants per square mile (534.9/km^{2}). There were 233 housing units at an average density of 568.3 per square mile (219.4/km^{2}). The racial makeup of the village was 95.1% White, 0.2% African American, 0.2% Native American, 0.2% Asian, 1.2% from other races, and 3.2% from two or more races. Hispanic or Latino of any race were 3.0% of the population.

There were 223 households, of which 29.1% had children under the age of 18 living with them, 56.5% were married couples living together, 7.2% had a female householder with no husband present, 5.8% had a male householder with no wife present, and 30.5% were non-families. 22.4% of all households were made up of individuals, and 9.4% had someone living alone who was 65 years of age or older. The average household size was 2.55 and the average family size was 2.98.

The median age in the village was 40.7 years. 23.1% of residents were under the age of 18; 6.3% were between the ages of 18 and 24; 27.5% were from 25 to 44; 31.1% were from 45 to 64; and 12.1% were 65 years of age or older. The gender makeup of the village was 49.6% male and 50.4% female.

=== 2000 census ===
As of the census of 2000, there were 544 people, 215 households, and 153 families living in the village. The population density was 1,406.8 inhabitants per square mile (543.2/km^{2}). There were 231 housing units at an average density of 597.4 per square mile (230.7/km^{2}). The racial makeup of the village was 97.06% White, 0.37% African American, 1.29% Native American, 0.55% Asian, and 0.74% from two or more races. Hispanic or Latino of any race were 1.10% of the population.

There were 215 households, out of which 31.2% had children under the age of 18 living with them, 55.8% were married couples living together, 10.2% had a female householder with no husband present, and 28.4% were non-families. 22.3% of all households were made up of individuals, and 8.8% had someone living alone who was 65 years of age or older. The average household size was 2.53 and the average family size was 2.94.

In the village, the population was spread out, with 26.8% under the age of 18, 6.8% from 18 to 24, 30.3% from 25 to 44, 24.4% from 45 to 64, and 11.6% who were 65 years of age or older. The median age was 37 years. For every 100 females, there were 106.1 males. For every 100 females age 18 and over, there were 101.0 males.

As of 2000 the median income for a household in the village was $43,194, and the median income for a family was $47,500. Males had a median income of $35,417 versus $21,375 for females. The per capita income for the village was $18,995. About 0.6% of families and 6.3% of the population were below the poverty line, including 3.6% of those under age 18 and 3.2% of those age 65 or over.
