= World of Outlaws Late Model Series =

American car racing series

- Category: Auto racing
- Country: United States
- Inaugural season: 1988
- Constructors: Barry Wright Race Cars · Black Diamond Chassis · Bob Pierce Race Cars · Capital Race Cars · CJ Rayburn · Club 29 Race Cars · CVR Race Cars · GRT · Longhorn Chassis · MasterSbilt · MB Customs · Rocket Chassis · Snow Brothers Chassis · Sweet-Bloomquist Race Cars · Warrior
- Drivers' champion: Bobby Pierce
- Makes' champion: Longhorn Chassis
- Teams' champion: Bobby Pierce Racing
- Official website: World of Outlaws Late Model Series

"World of Outlaws Late Model Feature Wins List". worldofoutlaws.com.

The World of Outlaws Late Model Series is a Dirt Super Late Model touring series currently owned and sanctioned by the World Racing Group. The series competes on dirt ovals across the United States, primarily throughout the East Coast and the Midwest. The series has also raced in Canada in previous years.

== Overview ==
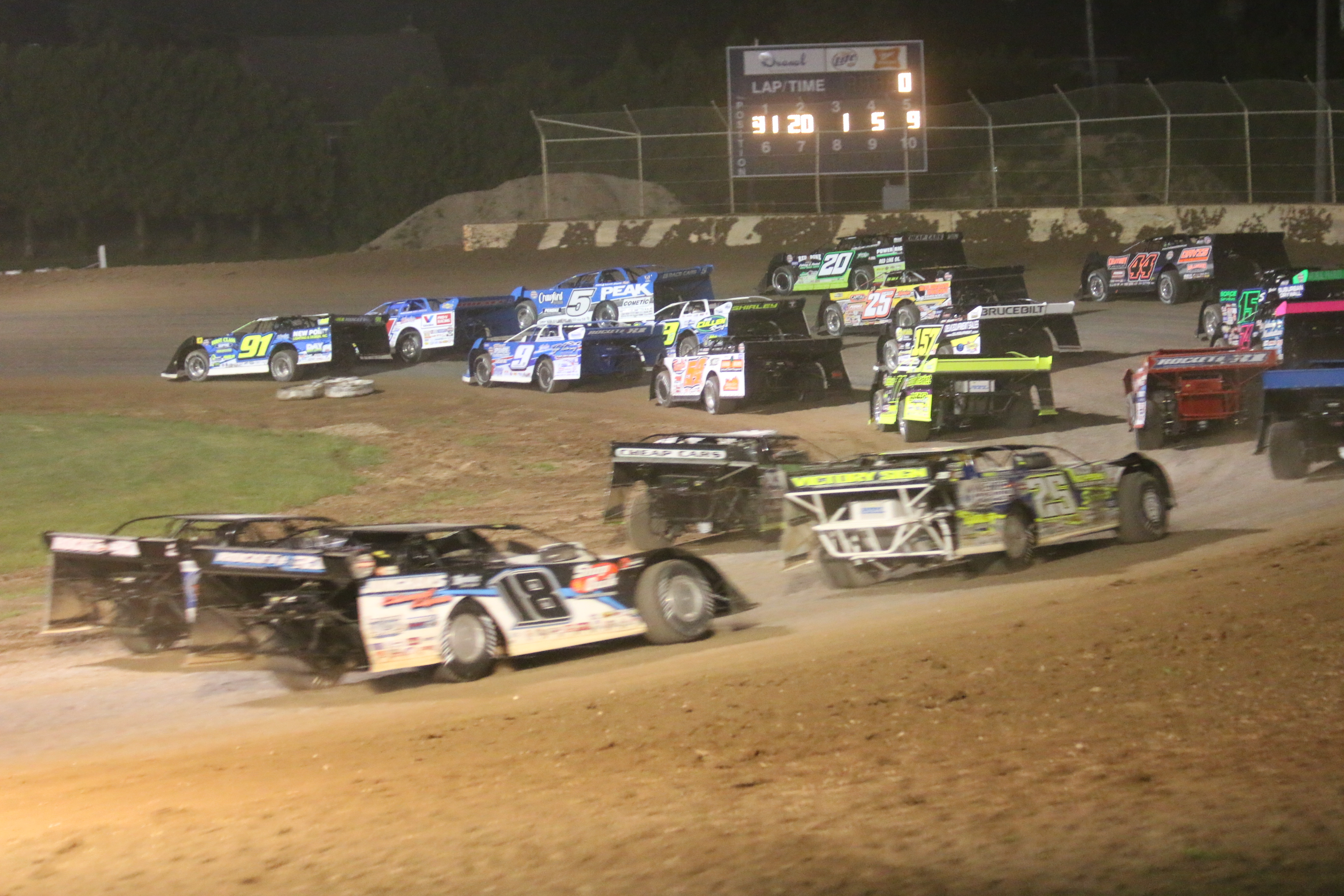
2018 drivers at the Plymouth (WI) Dirt Track

In 1988 Ted Johnson, the then proprietor of the World of Outlaws, sought to extend his successful touring series model from sprint cars to the late models. He signed 12 elite drivers to a 21-race schedule at 17 venues from Pennsylvania to Oklahoma. The series went dormant after just two seasons, but was revived by the World Racing Group in 2004.

The cars feature a purpose-built chassis design specifically for dirt late model racing. With many chassis builders within the sport, chassis design and components are always employing new innovation and technology. The cars are powered by aluminum-head V8 engines (usually ranging between 400c.i. & 430c.i.) that produce over 800 horsepower.

== Past champions ==
Season	Driver	Season	Driver
1988	Billy Moyer Sr.	2015	Shane Clanton
1989	Billy Moyer Sr.	2016	Josh Richards
2004	Scott Bloomquist	2017	Brandon Sheppard
2005	Billy Moyer Sr.	2018	Mike Marlar
2006	Tim McCreadie	2019	Brandon Sheppard
2007	Steve Francis	2020	Brandon Sheppard
2008	Darrell Lanigan	2021	Brandon Sheppard
2009	Josh Richards	2022	Dennis Erb Jr
2010	Josh Richards	2023	Bobby Pierce
2011	Rick Eckert	2024	Brandon Sheppard
2012	Darrell Lanigan	2025	Bobby Pierce
2013	Josh Richards	2026	Bobby Pierce
2014	Darrell Lanigan		

== Top 25 Feature winners ==
Last Update: November 7, 2026

Driver	Wins	Titles	Driver	Wins	Titles
1. Brandon Sheppard	90	5	13. Nick Hoffman	20	
2. Josh Richards	78	4	13. Jonathan Davenport	20	
3. Darrell Lanigan	74	3	16. Mike Marlar	19	1
4. Bobby Pierce	61	2	17. Ryan Gustin	16	
5. Shane Clanton	48	1	17. Chub Frank	16	
6. Billy Moyer Sr.	42	3	19. Dennis Erb Jr.	15	1
7. Tim McCreadie	41	1	20. Tim Fuller	14	
8. Chris Madden	40		20. Dale McDowell	14	
9. Rick Eckert	38	1	20. Devin Moran	14	
10. Scott Bloomquist	33	1	23. Shannon Babb	13	
11. Steve Francis	28	1	23. Brian Shirley	13	
12. Jimmy Owens	21		25. Clint Smith	12	
13. Brandon Overton	20				

== Rookie of the Year ==
Season	Driver	Season	Driver
1988	Not Awarded	2015	Brandon Overton
1989	Not Awarded	2016	Billy Moyer Jr.
2004	Tim McCreadie	2017	Devin Moran
2005	Josh Richards	2018	David Breazeale
2006	Eddie Carrier Jr.	2019	Ricky Weiss
2007	Tim Fuller	2020	Ashton Winger
2008	Vic Coffey	2021	Tyler Bruening
2009	Russell King	2022	Tanner English
2010	Austin Hubbard	2023	Nick Hoffman
2011	Pat Doar	2024	Dustin Sorensen
2012	Bub McCool	2025	Drake Troutman
2013	Eric Wells	2026	Daulton Wilson
2014	Frank Heckenast Jr.		

== Images ==
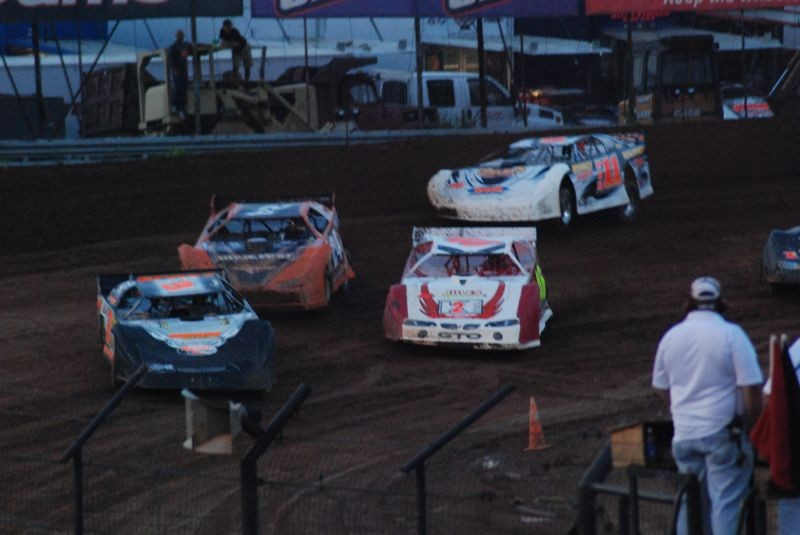
Racing at Lernerville Speedway in 2008

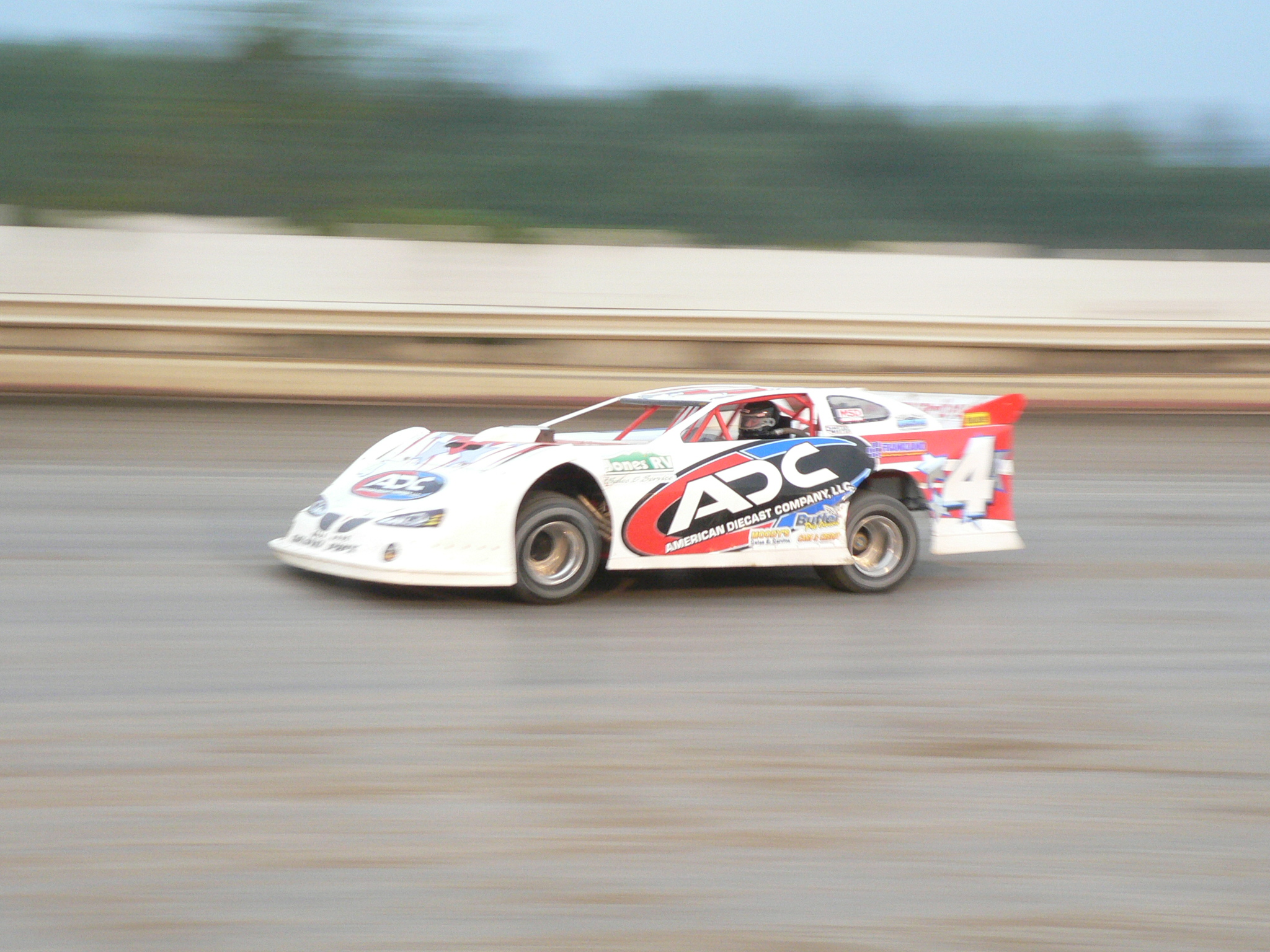
2006 Late Model
