= 2018 Lucas Oil Late Model Dirt Series =

13th season of American touring series

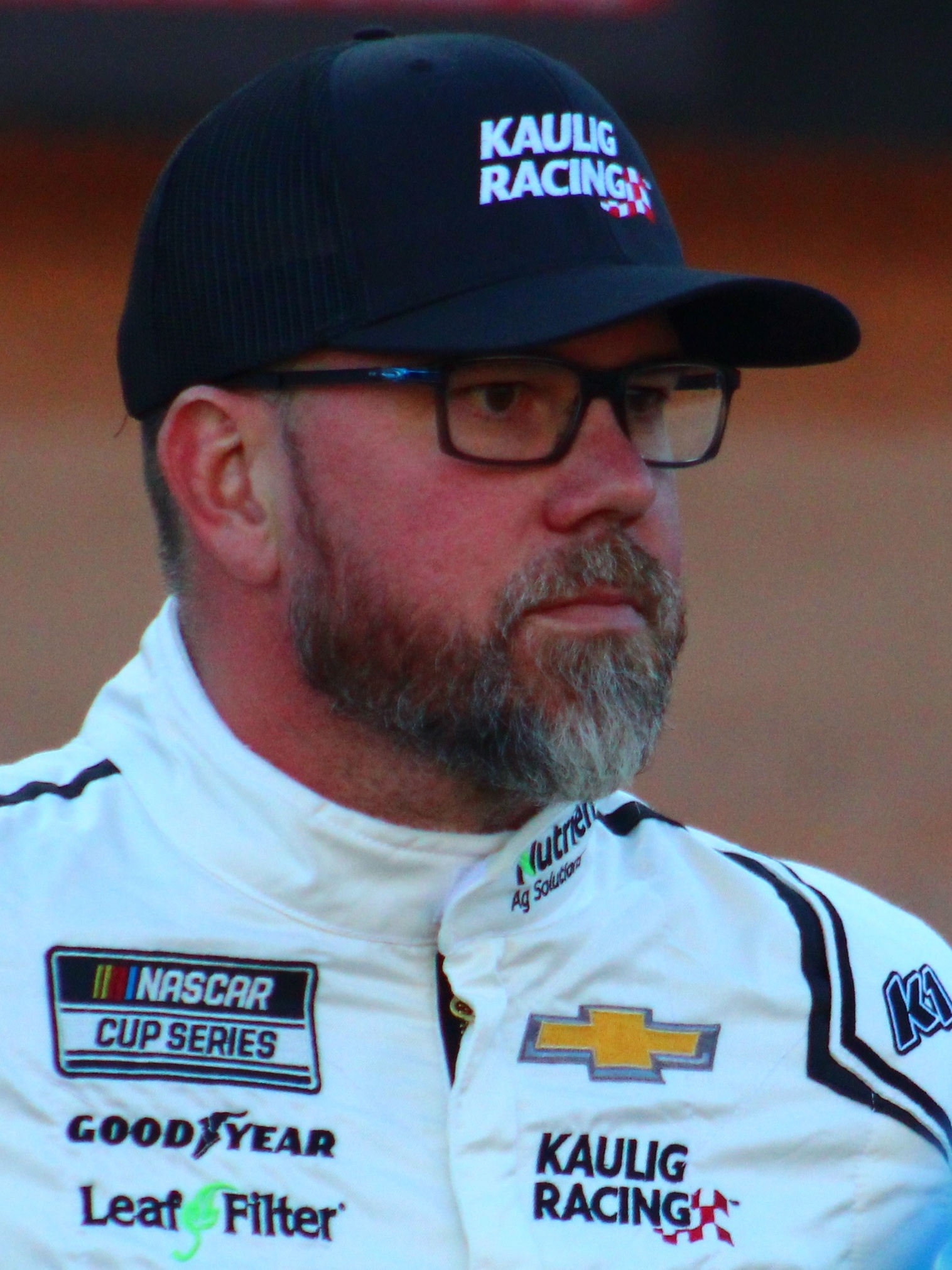
Jonathan Davenport won his first Lucas Oil Late Model Dirt Series Championship

The 2018 Lucas Oil Late Model Dirt Series is the 13th season of the Lucas Oil Late Model Dirt Series, a national touring series for dirt late models owned & operated by Lucas Oil. The series began with the Super Bowl of Racing at Golden Isles Speedway on February 2, and ended with the Dirt Track World Championship at Portsmouth Raceway Park on October 20.

== Teams and drivers ==
=== Complete schedule ===
No.	Race driver	Team	Chassis	Engine
0	Scott Bloomquist	Scott Bloomquist	Sweet-Bloomquist	Durham Racing Engines
1	Earl Pearson Jr.	Stuckey Enterprises	Black Diamond	Clements Racing Engines
1R	Josh Richards	Best Performance Motorsports	Rocket	Durham Racing Engines
5	Don O'Neal	Clint Bowyer Racing	Club 29	Cornett Racing Engines
5	Don O'Neal	Clint Bowyer Racing	Club 29	Clements Racing Engines
14	Darrell Lanigan	Clint Bowyer Racing	Club 29	Cornett Racing Engines
14	Darrell Lanigan	Clint Bowyer Racing	Club 29	Clements Racing Engines
20	Jimmy Owens	Ramirez Motorsports	Rocket	Durham Racing Engines
22	Gregg Satterlee	Gary Satterlee	Rocket	Durham Racing Engines
25z	Mason Zeigler	Z Team Racing, LLC	Rocket	Pro Power Racing Engines
28	Dennis Erb Jr.	Dennis Erb Jr.	Black Diamond	Clements Racing Engines
32	Bobby Pierce	Dunn-Benson Motorsports	Rocket	Pro Power Racing Engines
39	Tim McCreadie	Coffey-McCreadie Enterprises	Longhorn	Pro Power Racing Engines
40b	Kyle Bronson	Wayne Hammond	Longhorn	Durham Racing Engines
49	Jonathan Davenport	Double L Motorsports	Longhorn	Durham Racing Engines
71	Hudson O'Neal	SSI Motorsports	Club 29	Clements Racing Engines

== Schedule ==
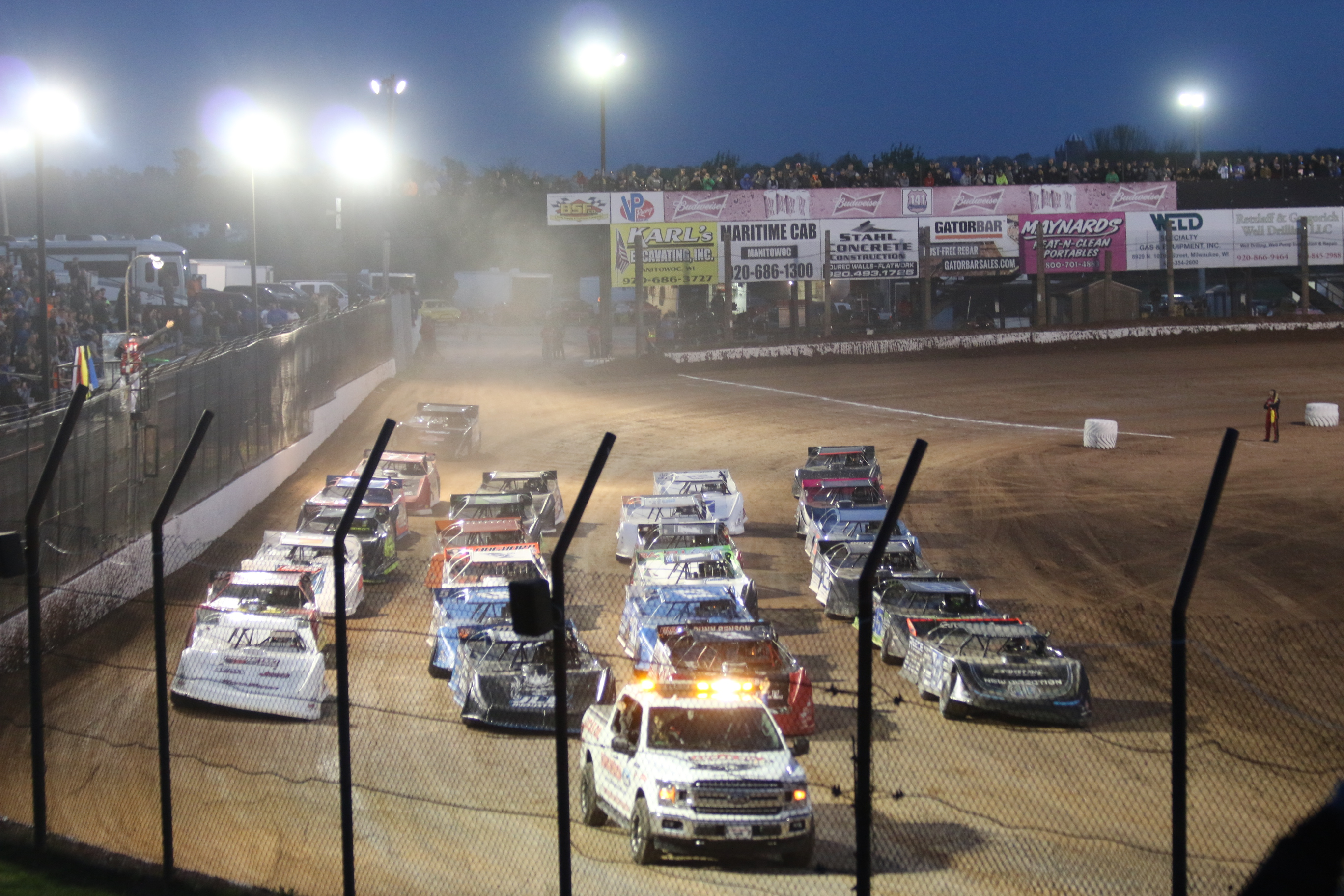
Drivers give a 4 wide salute to fans at 141 Speedway

MavTV, CBS, CBS Sports Network and NBCSN will broadcast select races on television. Of those select races, MavTV will have live coverage of the Show-Me 100 while the rest will be delayed across the 4 networks. LucasOilRacing.TV and Dirt on DIRT will also broadcast select races with live video coverage.

No.	Date	Race title	Track	TV / Stream
1	February 2	Super Bowl of Racing	Golden Isles Speedway, Brunswick, Georgia	LucasOilRacing.TV MavTV
2	February 3	Super Bowl of Racing	Golden Isles Speedway, Brunswick, Georgia	LucasOilRacing.TV CBS Sports Network MavTV NBCSN
3	February 5	41st annual Winternationals	East Bay Raceway Park, Tampa, Florida	LucasOilRacing.TV MavTV
4	February 6	41st annual Winternationals	East Bay Raceway Park, Tampa, Florida	LucasOilRacing.TV MavTV
5	February 7	41st annual Winternationals	East Bay Raceway Park, Tampa, Florida	LucasOilRacing.TV MavTV
6	February 8	41st annual Winternationals	East Bay Raceway Park, Tampa, Florida	LucasOilRacing.TV MavTV
7	February 9	41st annual Winternationals	East Bay Raceway Park, Tampa, Florida	LucasOilRacing.TV MavTV
8	February 10	41st annual Winternationals	East Bay Raceway Park, Tampa, Florida	LucasOilRacing.TV CBS Sports Network MavTV NBCSN
9	February 11	Winter Nationals	Bubba Raceway Park, Ocala, Florida	LucasOilRacing.TV MavTV NBCSN
≠	March 16	Buckeye Spring 50	Atomic Speedway, Chillicothe, Ohio	
≠	March 17	21st Annual Indiana Icebreaker	Brownstown Speedway, Brownstown, Indiana	
≠	March 22	16th Annual Spring Thaw	Volunteer Speedway, Bulls Gap, Tennessee	
10	March 23	The Shamrock	Boyd's Speedway, Ringgold, Georgia	
11	March 24	21st Annual Bama Bash	East Alabama Motor Speedway, Phenix City, Alabama	
≠	April 6	Bad Boy 98	Batesville Motor Speedway, Batesville, Arkansas	
≠	April 7	Bad Boy 98	Batesville Motor Speedway, Batesville, Arkansas	
12	April 13	Buckeye Spring 50	Atomic Speedway, Chillicothe, Ohio	
≠	April 14	21st Annual Indiana Icebreaker	Brownstown Speedway, Brownstown, Indiana	
≠	April 20	Steel Valley 50	Sharon Speedway, Sharon, Ohio	
13	April 21	37th Annual Stanley Schetrompf Classic	Hagerstown Speedway, Hagerstown, Maryland	
14	April 22	The Rumble by the River	Port Royal Speedway, Port Royal, Pennsylvania	
15	April 27	Busch 50	Tri-City Speedway, Granite City, Illinois	LucasOilRacing.TV' MavTV
16	April 28	St. Louis U-Pic-A-Part 100	Macon Speedway, Macon, Illinois	Dirt on DIRT
17	May 4	Toyota Knoxville 50	Tazewell Speedway, Tazewell, Tennessee	
≠	May 5	32nd Annual Ralph Latham Memorial	Florence Speedway, Florence, Kentucky	
18	May 18	Spring Shootout	141 Speedway, Maribel, Wisconsin	
19	May 19	NAPA North Star Nationals	Deer Creek Speedway, Spring Valley, Minnesota	
≠	May 20	Go 50	I-80 Speedway, Greenwood, Nebraska	
20	May 24	5th Annual Cowboy Classic	Lucas Oil Speedway, Wheatland, Missouri	LucasOilRacing.TV MavTV
21	May 25	The Tribute to Don & Billie Gibson	Lucas Oil Speedway, Wheatland, Missouri	LucasOilRacing.TV MavTV
22	May 26	25th Annual Lucas Oil Show-Me 100	Lucas Oil Speedway, Wheatland, Missouri	MavTV / LucasOilRacing.TV CBS CBS Sports Network NBCSN
≠	June 1	Salute to the Troops 75	LaSalle Speedway, LaSalle, Illinois	
≠	June 2	Salute to the Troops 75	LaSalle Speedway, LaSalle, Illinois	
≈	June 14	Clash at the Mag	Magnolia Motor Speedway, Columbus, Mississippi	
≈	June 15	Clash at the Mag	Magnolia Motor Speedway, Columbus, Mississippi	LucasOilRacing.TV CBS Sports Network MavTV NBCSN
23	June 16	Clash at the Mag	Magnolia Motor Speedway, Columbus, Mississippi	LucasOilRacing.TV CBS Sports Network MavTV NBCSN
24	June 30	Independence 50	Portsmouth Raceway Park, Portsmouth, Ohio	
25	July 1	Freedom 50	Mansfield Motor Speedway, Mansfield, Ohio	Dirt on DIRT
26	July 2	Steel City 50	Sharon Speedway, Sharon, Ohio	
27	July 3		Muskingum County Speedway, Zanesville, Ohio	
28	July 5	Wayne Gray Sr. Memorial	Fayetteville Motor Speedway, Fayetteville, North Carolina	
29	July 6	20th Annual Grassy Smith Memorial	Cherokee Speedway, Gaffney, South Carolina	
30	July 7	Mountain Moonshine Classic	Smoky Mountain Speedway, Maryville, Tennessee	
31	July 13	NAPA Know How 50	Tri-City Speedway, Granite City, Illinois	LucasOilRacing.TV MavTV NBCSN
32	July 14	12th Annual Diamond Nationals	Lucas Oil Speedway, Wheatland, Missouri	LucasOilRacing.TV CBS Sports Network MavTV NBCSN
33	July 17	Bullet SportsWear Shootout	Brown County Speedway, Aberdeen, South Dakota	Dirt on DIRT
34	July 18		Jackson Motorplex, Jackson, Minnesota	Dirt on DIRT
35	July 19	Go 50	I-80 Speedway, Greenwood, Nebraska	Dirt on DIRT
≈	July 19	8th Annual Silver Dollar Nationals	I-80 Speedway, Greenwood, Nebraska	Dirt on DIRT
≈	July 20	8th Annual Silver Dollar Nationals	I-80 Speedway, Greenwood, Nebraska	Dirt on DIRT
36	July 21	8th Annual Silver Dollar Nationals	I-80 Speedway, Greenwood, Nebraska	Dirt on DIRT
37	August 8	32nd Annual Ralph Latham Memorial	Florence Speedway, Florence, Kentucky	
38	August 9	North/South Shootout	Florence Speedway, Florence, Kentucky	MavTV
≈	August 10	38th Annual Sunoco North/South 100	Florence Speedway, Florence, Kentucky	CBS Sports Network MavTV NBCSN
39	August 11	38th Annual Sunoco North/South 100	Florence Speedway, Florence, Kentucky	CBS Sports Network MavTV NBCSN
40	August 16		Batesville Motor Speedway, Batesville, Arkansas	LucasOilRacing.TV MavTV
41	August 17		Batesville Motor Speedway, Batesville, Arkansas	LucasOilRacing.TV MavTV
42	August 18	26th Annual COMP Cams Topless 100	Batesville Motor Speedway, Batesville, Arkansas	LucasOilRacing.TV MavTV
43	August 24	Dirt Million Prelims	Mansfield Motor Speedway, Mansfield, Ohio	Dirt on DIRT
44	August 24	Dirt Million Prelims	Mansfield Motor Speedway, Mansfield, Ohio	Dirt on DIRT
45	August 25	Dirt Million	Mansfield Motor Speedway, Mansfield, Ohio	Dirt on DIRT
46	August 31	15th Annual John Bradshaw Memorial	Ponderosa Speedway, Junction City, Kentucky	
47	September 1	Bob Miller Memorial	Portsmouth Raceway Park, Portsmouth, Ohio	
48	September 2	50th Annual Hillbilly Hundred	Tyler County Speedway, Middlebourne, West Virginia	
49	September 13	15th Annual Lucas Oil Knoxville Late Model Nationals	Knoxville Raceway, Knoxville, Iowa	Dirt on DIRT MavTV
50	September 14	15th Annual Lucas Oil Knoxville Late Model Nationals	Knoxville Raceway, Knoxville, Iowa	Dirt on DIRT MavTV
51	September 15	15th Annual Lucas Oil Knoxville Late Model Nationals	Knoxville Raceway, Knoxville, Iowa	LucasOilRacing.TV CBS Sports Network MavTV NBCSN
≈	September 21	39th Annual Jackson 100	Brownstown Speedway, Brownstown, Indiana	
52	September 22	39th Annual Jackson 100	Brownstown Speedway, Brownstown, Indiana	Dirt on DIRT
53	September 29	Dixie Shootout	Dixie Speedway, Woodstock, Georgia	
54	September 30	Rome Showdown	Rome Speedway, Rome, Georgia	
≈	October 5	30th Annual Pittsburgher 100	Pittsburgh's PA Motor Speedway, Pittsburgh, Pennsylvania	Dirt on DIRT
55	October 6	30th Annual Pittsburgher 100	Pittsburgh's PA Motor Speedway, Pittsburgh, Pennsylvania	Dirt on DIRT
≈	October 19	38th Annual Dirt Track World Championship	Portsmouth Raceway Park, Portsmouth, Ohio	
56	October 20	38th Annual Dirt Track World Championship	Portsmouth Raceway Park, Portsmouth, Ohio	LucasOilRacing.TV CBS Sports Network MavTV NBCSN

- ≠ - the race was postponed or canceled
- ≈ - will state if the race is not for championship points

=== Schedule notes and changes ===
- - the Buckeye Spring 50 at Atomic Speedway (March 16) was postponed to April 13 due to cold temperatures.
- - the 21st Annual Indiana Icebreaker at Brownstown Speedway (March 17) was postponed to April 14 due to cold temperatures. The rescheduled race was canceled due to heavy rain.
- - the Spring Thaw at Volunteer Speedway (March 22) was canceled due to weather conditions.
- - the Bad Boy 98 at Batesville Motor Speedway (April 6 & 7) was canceled due to weather conditions.
- - the Steel Valley 50 at Sharon Speedway (April 20) was postponed to July 2 due to saturated grounds & cold temperatures.
- - the 32nd Annual Ralph Latham Memorial at Florence Speedway (May 5) was postponed to August 8 due to heavy rain.
- - the Go 50 at I-80 Speedway (May 20) was postponed to July 19 due to rain.
- - the Salute to the Troops 75 at LaSalle Speedway (June 1 & 2) was canceled.

== Results and standings ==
=== Races ===
No.	Race / Track	Winning driver	Winning team	Hard Charger Award	B-Main winner	Fastest Qualifier
1	Super Bowl of Racing (Night #1)	Josh Richards	Best Performance Motorsports	Hudson O'Neal +13	Tim McCreadie	Jonathan Davenport
1	Super Bowl of Racing (Night #1)	Josh Richards	Best Performance Motorsports	Hudson O'Neal +13	Mason Ziegler	Josh Richards
2	Super Bowl of Racing (Night #2)	Josh Richards	Best Performance Motorsports	Josh Richards +22	Gregg Satterlee	Brent Larson
2	Super Bowl of Racing (Night #2)	Josh Richards	Best Performance Motorsports	Josh Richards +22	Don O'Neal	Jonathan Davenport
3	East Bay Winternationals (Night #1)	Brandon Sheppard	Mark Richards Racing	Scott Bloomquist +13	Gregg Satterlee	Kyle Bronson
3	East Bay Winternationals (Night #1)	Brandon Sheppard	Mark Richards Racing	Scott Bloomquist +13	Scott Bloomquist	Josh Richards
4	East Bay Winternationals (Night #2)	Jonathan Davenport	Double L Motorsports	Bobby Pierce +18	Josh Richards	Billy Moyer Jr.
4	East Bay Winternationals (Night #2)	Jonathan Davenport	Double L Motorsports	Bobby Pierce +18	Earl Pearson Jr.	Jonathan Davenport
5	East Bay Winternationals (Night #3)	Brandon Overton	Chip Stone / Randy Weaver	Brandon Sheppard +14	Kyle Bronson	Boom Briggs
5	East Bay Winternationals (Night #3)	Brandon Overton	Chip Stone / Randy Weaver	Brandon Sheppard +14	Mason Zeigler	Mike Benedum
6	East Bay Winternationals (Night #4)	Brandon Sheppard	Mark Richards Racing	Brandon Sheppard +20	Jonathan Davenport	Boom Briggs
6	East Bay Winternationals (Night #4)	Brandon Sheppard	Mark Richards Racing	Brandon Sheppard +20	Michael Maresca	Kyle Bronson
7	East Bay Winternationals (Night #5)	Jonathan Davenport	Double L Motorsports	Jimmy Owens +16	Chub Frank	Billy Moyer Jr.
7	East Bay Winternationals (Night #5)	Jonathan Davenport	Double L Motorsports	Jimmy Owens +16	Brandon Overton	Josh Richards
8	East Bay Winternationals (Night #6)	Kyle Bronson	Wayne Hammond	Brandon Overton +11	Darrell Lanigan	Jonathan Davenport
8	East Bay Winternationals (Night #6)	Kyle Bronson	Wayne Hammond	Brandon Overton +11	Jimmy Owens	Billy Moyer Jr.
9	Bubba Winter Nationals	Jonathan Davenport	Double L Motorsports	Scott Bloomquist +14	Jason Fitzgerald	Tyler Erb
9	Bubba Winter Nationals	Jonathan Davenport	Double L Motorsports	Scott Bloomquist +14	Don O'Neal	Tim McCreadie
10	The Shamrock	Earl Pearson Jr.	Stuckey Enterprises	Tim McCreadie +11	Don O'Neal	Chris Madden
10	The Shamrock	Earl Pearson Jr.	Stuckey Enterprises	Tim McCreadie +11	Josh Richards	Earl Pearson Jr.
11	Bama Bash	Brandon Sheppard	Mark Richards Racing	Dale McDowell +14	Jonathan Davenport	Josh Richards
11	Bama Bash	Brandon Sheppard	Mark Richards Racing	Dale McDowell +14	Dale McDowell	Jimmy Owens
12	Buckeye Spring 50	Scott Bloomquist	Scott Bloomquist	Jonathan Davenport +18	Tyler Carpenter	Earl Pearson Jr.
12	Buckeye Spring 50	Scott Bloomquist	Scott Bloomquist	Jonathan Davenport +18	Tyler Carpenter	Scott Bloomquist
13	Stanley Schetrompf Classic	Jonathan Davenport	Double L Motorsports	Earl Pearson Jr. +14	Hudson O'Neal	Jonathan Davenport
13	Stanley Schetrompf Classic	Jonathan Davenport	Double L Motorsports	Earl Pearson Jr. +14	Don O'Neal	Kenny Moreland
14	Rumble by the River	Scott Bloomquist	Scott Bloomquist	Jonathan Davenport +12	Hudson O'Neal	Dan Stone
14	Rumble by the River	Scott Bloomquist	Scott Bloomquist	Jonathan Davenport +12	Jonathan Davenport	Austin Hubbard
15	Busch 50	Bobby Pierce	Dunn-Benson Motorsports	Jonathan Davenport +8	Hudson O'Neal	Bobby Pierce
15	Busch 50	Bobby Pierce	Dunn-Benson Motorsports	Jonathan Davenport +8	Kolby Vandenbergh	Scott Bloomquist
16	St. Louis U-Pic-A-Part 100	Bobby Pierce	Dunn-Benson Motorsports	Don O'Neal +8	-	Jonathan Davenport
16	St. Louis U-Pic-A-Part 100	Bobby Pierce	Dunn-Benson Motorsports	Don O'Neal +8	-	Josh Richards
17	Toyota Knoxville 50	Jonathan Davenport	Double L Motorsports	Gregg Satterlee +14	Mason Ziegler	Tim McCreadie
17	Toyota Knoxville 50	Jonathan Davenport	Double L Motorsports	Gregg Satterlee +14	Mason Ziegler	Jason Jameson
18	Spring Shootout	Earl Pearson Jr.	Stuckey Enterprises	Dennis Erb Jr. +8	-	Bobby Pierce
18	Spring Shootout	Earl Pearson Jr.	Stuckey Enterprises	Dennis Erb Jr. +8	-	Josh Richards
19	NAPA North Star Nationals	Jonathan Davenport	Double L Motorsports	Don O'Neal +12	Ricky Weiss	Chad Simpson
19	NAPA North Star Nationals	Jonathan Davenport	Double L Motorsports	Don O'Neal +12	Mason Ziegler	Bobby Pierce
20	Cowboy Classic	Scott Bloomquist	Scott Bloomquist	Brian Shirley +13	Will Vaught	Jared Landers
20	Cowboy Classic	Scott Bloomquist	Scott Bloomquist	Brian Shirley +13	Brandon Sheppard	Jared Landers
20	Cowboy Classic	Scott Bloomquist	Scott Bloomquist	Brian Shirley +13	Shanon Buckingham	Scott Bloomquist
21	The Tribute to Don & Billie Gibson	Jimmy Owens	Ramirez Motorsports	Scott Bloomquist +17	Dennis Erb Jr.	Kyle Bronson
21	The Tribute to Don & Billie Gibson	Jimmy Owens	Ramirez Motorsports	Scott Bloomquist +17	Scott Bloomquist	Kyle Bronson
21	The Tribute to Don & Billie Gibson	Jimmy Owens	Ramirez Motorsports	Scott Bloomquist +17	Jared Landers	Jimmy Owens
22	Show-Me 100	Scott Bloomquist	Scott Bloomquist	Dennis Erb Jr. +10	Gregg Satterlee	-
22	Show-Me 100	Scott Bloomquist	Scott Bloomquist	Dennis Erb Jr. +10	Earl Pearson Jr.	-
22	Show-Me 100	Scott Bloomquist	Scott Bloomquist	Dennis Erb Jr. +10	Josh Richards	-
