= 2019 Lucas Oil Late Model Dirt Series =

14th season of American touring series

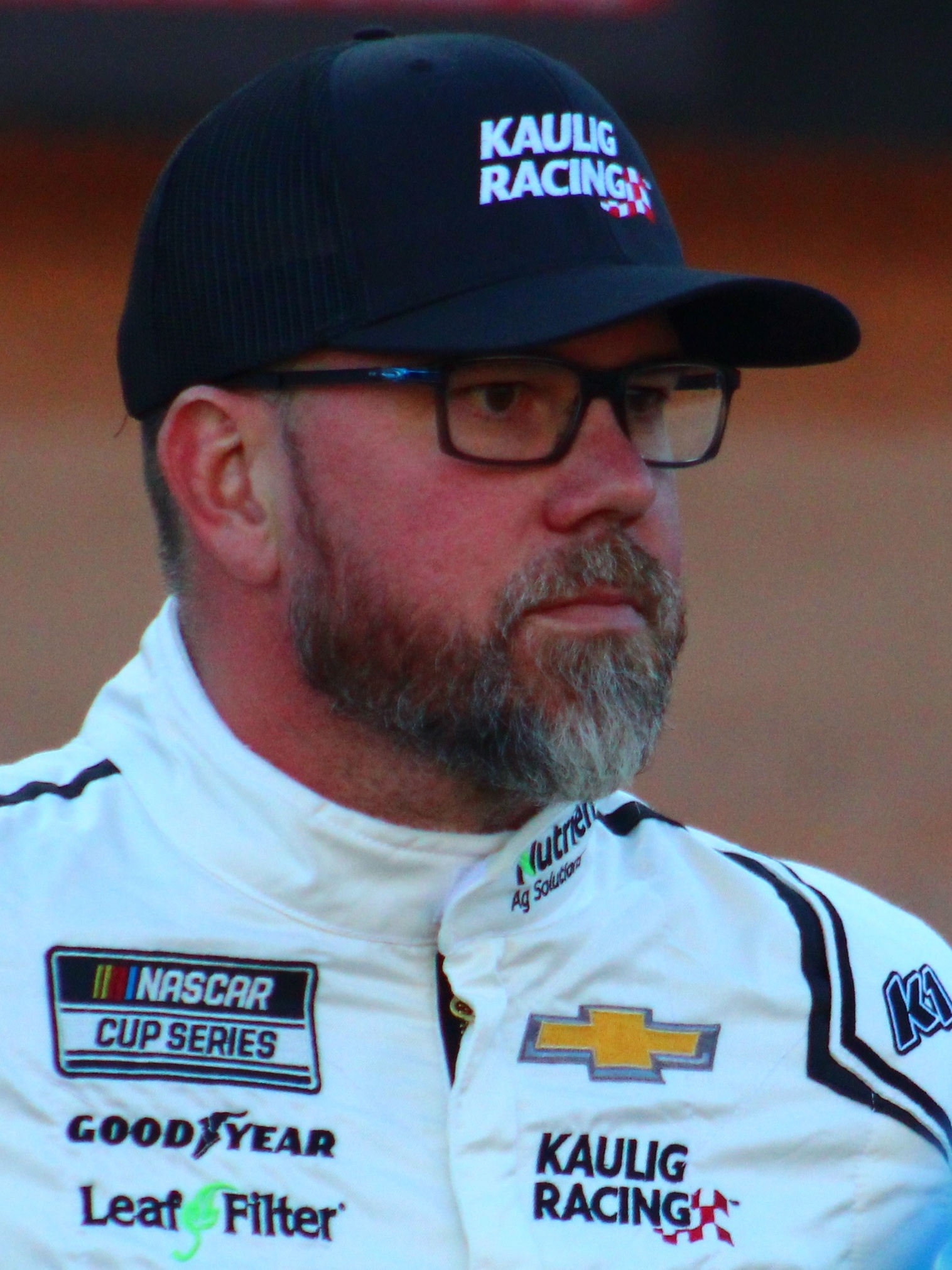
Jonathan Davenport won his third Lucas Oil Late Model Dirt Series Championship

The 2019 Lucas Oil Late Model Dirt Series was the 14th season of the Lucas Oil Late Model Dirt Series, a national touring series for dirt late models owned & operated by Lucas Oil. The series began with the Super Bowl of Racing at Golden Isles Speedway on February 1, and ended with the Dirt Track World Championship at Portsmouth Raceway Park on October 19. Jonathan Davenport won the 2019 drivers' championship. Tyler Erb was named 2019 rookie of the year.

== Schedule and results ==
The 2019 schedule was released on October 29, 2018.

No.	Date	Race / Track	Winning driver	Heat winner	B-Main winner	Fastest Qualifier
1	Feb 2	Super Bowl of Racing - Golden Isles Speedway, Brunswick, Georgia	Tyler Erb ($12,000)	Hudson O'Neal	Jason Jameson	Hudson O'Neal
1	Feb 2	Super Bowl of Racing - Golden Isles Speedway, Brunswick, Georgia	Tyler Erb ($12,000)	Earl Pearson Jr.	Shanon Buckingham	Brian Shirley
1	Feb 2	Super Bowl of Racing - Golden Isles Speedway, Brunswick, Georgia	Tyler Erb ($12,000)	Josh Richards		
1	Feb 2	Super Bowl of Racing - Golden Isles Speedway, Brunswick, Georgia	Tyler Erb ($12,000)	Tyler Erb		-
2	Feb 2 (night)	Super Bowl of Racing - Golden Isles Speedway, Brunswick, Georgia	Earl Pearson Jr. ($12,000)	Scott Bloomquist	Hudson O'Neal	Earl Pearson Jr.
2	Feb 2 (night)	Super Bowl of Racing - Golden Isles Speedway, Brunswick, Georgia	Earl Pearson Jr. ($12,000)	Josh Richards	Tim McCreadie	Jonathan Davenport
2	Feb 2 (night)	Super Bowl of Racing - Golden Isles Speedway, Brunswick, Georgia	Earl Pearson Jr. ($12,000)	Jimmy Owens		
2	Feb 2 (night)	Super Bowl of Racing - Golden Isles Speedway, Brunswick, Georgia	Earl Pearson Jr. ($12,000)	Tyler Erb		37 cars entered
3	Feb 4	Winternationals - East Bay Raceway Park, Tampa, Florida	Tyler Erb ($5,000)	Tyler Erb	Tim McCreadie	Mike Marlar
3	Feb 4	Winternationals - East Bay Raceway Park, Tampa, Florida	Tyler Erb ($5,000)	Hudson O'Neal	Brandon Overton	Brian Shirley
3	Feb 4	Winternationals - East Bay Raceway Park, Tampa, Florida	Tyler Erb ($5,000)	Josh Richards		
3	Feb 4	Winternationals - East Bay Raceway Park, Tampa, Florida	Tyler Erb ($5,000)	Jonathan Davenport		
3	Feb 4	Winternationals - East Bay Raceway Park, Tampa, Florida	Tyler Erb ($5,000)	Brandon Sheppard		
3	Feb 4	Winternationals - East Bay Raceway Park, Tampa, Florida	Tyler Erb ($5,000)	Chase Junghans		53 cars entered
4	Feb 5	Winternationals - East Bay Raceway Park, Tampa, Florida	Tyler Erb ($5,000)	Earl Pearson Jr.	Stormy Scott	Stormy Scott
4	Feb 5	Winternationals - East Bay Raceway Park, Tampa, Florida	Tyler Erb ($5,000)	Brandon Sheppard	Don O'Neal	Tyler Erb
4	Feb 5	Winternationals - East Bay Raceway Park, Tampa, Florida	Tyler Erb ($5,000)	Shanon Buckingham		
4	Feb 5	Winternationals - East Bay Raceway Park, Tampa, Florida	Tyler Erb ($5,000)	Tyler Erb		
4	Feb 5	Winternationals - East Bay Raceway Park, Tampa, Florida	Tyler Erb ($5,000)	Jimmy Owens		
4	Feb 5	Winternationals - East Bay Raceway Park, Tampa, Florida	Tyler Erb ($5,000)	Morgan Bagley		56 cars entered
5	Feb 6	Winternationals - East Bay Raceway Park, Tampa, Florida	Jonathan Davenport ($7,000)	Colton Flinner	Tim McCreadie	Colton Flinner
5	Feb 6	Winternationals - East Bay Raceway Park, Tampa, Florida	Jonathan Davenport ($7,000)	Don O'Neal	Kyle Bronson	Brian Shirley
5	Feb 6	Winternationals - East Bay Raceway Park, Tampa, Florida	Jonathan Davenport ($7,000)	Jonathan Davenport		
5	Feb 6	Winternationals - East Bay Raceway Park, Tampa, Florida	Jonathan Davenport ($7,000)	Brian Shirley		
5	Feb 6	Winternationals - East Bay Raceway Park, Tampa, Florida	Jonathan Davenport ($7,000)	Brandon Sheppard		
5	Feb 6	Winternationals - East Bay Raceway Park, Tampa, Florida	Jonathan Davenport ($7,000)	Tanner English		52 cars entered
6	Feb 7	Winternationals - East Bay Raceway Park, Tampa, Florida	Hudson O'Neal ($7,000)	Kyle Bronson	Don O'Neal	Mike Benedum
6	Feb 7	Winternationals - East Bay Raceway Park, Tampa, Florida	Hudson O'Neal ($7,000)	Tyler Erb	Brandon Overton	Brian Shirley
6	Feb 7	Winternationals - East Bay Raceway Park, Tampa, Florida	Hudson O'Neal ($7,000)	Stormy Scott		
6	Feb 7	Winternationals - East Bay Raceway Park, Tampa, Florida	Hudson O'Neal ($7,000)	Earl Pearson Jr.		
6	Feb 7	Winternationals - East Bay Raceway Park, Tampa, Florida	Hudson O'Neal ($7,000)	Jonathan Davenport		
6	Feb 7	Winternationals - East Bay Raceway Park, Tampa, Florida	Hudson O'Neal ($7,000)	Tanner English		49 cars entered
7	Feb 8	Winternationals - East Bay Raceway Park, Tampa, Florida	Jonathan Davenport ($12,000)	Jonathan Davenport	Stormy Scott	Scott Bloomquist
7	Feb 8	Winternationals - East Bay Raceway Park, Tampa, Florida	Jonathan Davenport ($12,000)	Tyler Erb	Terry Casey	Earl Pearson Jr.
7	Feb 8	Winternationals - East Bay Raceway Park, Tampa, Florida	Jonathan Davenport ($12,000)	Earl Pearson Jr.		
7	Feb 8	Winternationals - East Bay Raceway Park, Tampa, Florida	Jonathan Davenport ($12,000)	Colton Flinner		46 cars entered
8	Feb 9	Winternationals - East Bay Raceway Park, Tampa, Florida	Jonathan Davenport ($12,000)	Tanner English	Terry Casey	Tanner English
8	Feb 9	Winternationals - East Bay Raceway Park, Tampa, Florida	Jonathan Davenport ($12,000)	Jonathan Davenport	Shanon Buckingham	Earl Pearson Jr.
8	Feb 9	Winternationals - East Bay Raceway Park, Tampa, Florida	Jonathan Davenport ($12,000)	Earl Pearson Jr.		
8	Feb 9	Winternationals - East Bay Raceway Park, Tampa, Florida	Jonathan Davenport ($12,000)	Tyler Erb		41 cars entered
9	Mar 16	Indiana Icebreaker - Brownstown Speedway, Brownstown, Indiana	Brandon Sheppard ($12,000)	Brandon Sheppard	Steve Casebolt	Brandon Sheppard
9	Mar 16	Indiana Icebreaker - Brownstown Speedway, Brownstown, Indiana	Brandon Sheppard ($12,000)	Devin Moran	Kyle Bronson	Hudson O'Neal
9	Mar 16	Indiana Icebreaker - Brownstown Speedway, Brownstown, Indiana	Brandon Sheppard ($12,000)	Hudson O'Neal		
9	Mar 16	Indiana Icebreaker - Brownstown Speedway, Brownstown, Indiana	Brandon Sheppard ($12,000)	Don O'Neal		34 cars entered
10	Apr 5	Tennessee's Action Track 50 - 411 Motor Speedway, Seymour, Tennessee	Ross Bailes ($12,000)	Ross Bailes	Cory Hedgecock	Ryan King
10	Apr 5	Tennessee's Action Track 50 - 411 Motor Speedway, Seymour, Tennessee	Ross Bailes ($12,000)	Josh Richards		Donald McIntosh
10	Apr 5	Tennessee's Action Track 50 - 411 Motor Speedway, Seymour, Tennessee	Ross Bailes ($12,000)	Dale McDowell		
10	Apr 5	Tennessee's Action Track 50 - 411 Motor Speedway, Seymour, Tennessee	Ross Bailes ($12,000)	Jimmy Owens		28 cars entered
11	Apr 6	North Georgia Speedway, Chatsworth, Georgia	Jonathan Davenport ($12,000)	Josh Richards	Jason Jameson	Ross Bailes
11	Apr 6	North Georgia Speedway, Chatsworth, Georgia	Jonathan Davenport ($12,000)	Dale McDowell	Stormy Scott	David Payne
11	Apr 6	North Georgia Speedway, Chatsworth, Georgia	Jonathan Davenport ($12,000)	David Payne		
11	Apr 6	North Georgia Speedway, Chatsworth, Georgia	Jonathan Davenport ($12,000)	Jonathan Davenport		31 cars entered
12	Apr 11	Buckeye Spring 50 - Atomic Speedway, Chillicothe, Ohio	Jimmy Owens ($12,000)	RJ Conley	Colten Burdette	Kyle Bronson
12	Apr 11	Buckeye Spring 50 - Atomic Speedway, Chillicothe, Ohio	Jimmy Owens ($12,000)	Jimmy Owens	Shanon Buckingham	Josh Richards
12	Apr 11	Buckeye Spring 50 - Atomic Speedway, Chillicothe, Ohio	Jimmy Owens ($12,000)	Josh Richards		
12	Apr 11	Buckeye Spring 50 - Atomic Speedway, Chillicothe, Ohio	Jimmy Owens ($12,000)	Devin Moran		33 cars entered
13	Apr 13	Stanley Schetrompf Classic - Hagerstown Speedway, Hagerstown, Maryland	Jonathan Davenport ($12,000)	Jonathan Davenport	Kyle Hardy	Kyle Bronson
13	Apr 13	Stanley Schetrompf Classic - Hagerstown Speedway, Hagerstown, Maryland	Jonathan Davenport ($12,000)	Jimmy Owens	Trever Feathers	Gene Knaub
13	Apr 13	Stanley Schetrompf Classic - Hagerstown Speedway, Hagerstown, Maryland	Jonathan Davenport ($12,000)	Gene Knaub		
13	Apr 13	Stanley Schetrompf Classic - Hagerstown Speedway, Hagerstown, Maryland	Jonathan Davenport ($12,000)	Earl Pearson Jr.		37 cars entered
14	May 16	TruAcre 50 - 34 Raceway, West Burlington, Iowa	Hudson O'Neal ($10,000)	Jonathan Davenport	Frank Heckenast Jr.	Jonathan Davenport
14	May 16	TruAcre 50 - 34 Raceway, West Burlington, Iowa	Hudson O'Neal ($10,000)	Earl Pearson Jr.	Shanon Buckingham	Tim McCreadie
14	May 16	TruAcre 50 - 34 Raceway, West Burlington, Iowa	Hudson O'Neal ($10,000)	Tyler Bruening		
14	May 16	TruAcre 50 - 34 Raceway, West Burlington, Iowa	Hudson O'Neal ($10,000)	Billy Moyer		35 cars entered
15	May 17	Truck Country 50 - 300 Raceway, Farley, Iowa	Jonathan Davenport ($12,000)	Brian Birkhofer	Jason Jameson	Jonathan Davenport
15	May 17	Truck Country 50 - 300 Raceway, Farley, Iowa	Jonathan Davenport ($12,000)	Jonathan Davenport		Brian Birkhofer
15	May 17	Truck Country 50 - 300 Raceway, Farley, Iowa	Jonathan Davenport ($12,000)	Kyle Bronson		26 cars entered
16	May 30	Clash at the Mag - Magnolia Motor Speedway, Columbus, Mississippi	Josh Richards ($5,000)	Josh Richards	Timothy Culp	Josh Richards
16	May 30	Clash at the Mag - Magnolia Motor Speedway, Columbus, Mississippi	Josh Richards ($5,000)	Kyle Bronson	Rick Rickman	Don O'Neal
16	May 30	Clash at the Mag - Magnolia Motor Speedway, Columbus, Mississippi	Josh Richards ($5,000)	Don O'Neal		
16	May 30	Clash at the Mag - Magnolia Motor Speedway, Columbus, Mississippi	Josh Richards ($5,000)	Tim McCreadie		39 cars entered
17	May 31	Clash at the Mag - Magnolia Motor Speedway, Columbus, Mississippi	Jonathan Davenport ($5,000)	Jonathan Davenport	Robbie Stuart	Kyle Bronson
17	May 31	Clash at the Mag - Magnolia Motor Speedway, Columbus, Mississippi	Jonathan Davenport ($5,000)	Michael Arnold	Scott Dedwylder	Mike Marlar
17	May 31	Clash at the Mag - Magnolia Motor Speedway, Columbus, Mississippi	Jonathan Davenport ($5,000)	Mike Marlar		
17	May 31	Clash at the Mag - Magnolia Motor Speedway, Columbus, Mississippi	Jonathan Davenport ($5,000)	Josh Richards		37 cars entered
18	Jun 1	Clash at the Mag - Magnolia Motor Speedway, Columbus, Mississippi	Mike Marlar ($15,000)		Jimmy Owens	
18	Jun 1	Clash at the Mag - Magnolia Motor Speedway, Columbus, Mississippi	Mike Marlar ($15,000)		Eric Cooley	39 cars entered
19	Jun 13	Wayne Gray Sr. Memorial - Fayetteville Motor Speedway, Fayetteville, North Carolina	Kyle Bronson ($10,000)	Tyler Erb	Devin Moran	Billy Moyer Jr.
19	Jun 13	Wayne Gray Sr. Memorial - Fayetteville Motor Speedway, Fayetteville, North Carolina	Kyle Bronson ($10,000)	Don O'Neal		Josh Richards
19	Jun 13	Wayne Gray Sr. Memorial - Fayetteville Motor Speedway, Fayetteville, North Carolina	Kyle Bronson ($10,000)	Josh Richards		
19	Jun 13	Wayne Gray Sr. Memorial - Fayetteville Motor Speedway, Fayetteville, North Carolina	Kyle Bronson ($10,000)	Kyle Bronson		30 cars entered
20	Jun 14	Grassy Smith Memorial - Cherokee Speedway, Gaffney, South Carolina	Mike Marlar ($12,000)	Mike Marlar	Josh Richards	Mike Marlar
20	Jun 14	Grassy Smith Memorial - Cherokee Speedway, Gaffney, South Carolina	Mike Marlar ($12,000)	Jonathan Davenport		Ross Bailes
20	Jun 14	Grassy Smith Memorial - Cherokee Speedway, Gaffney, South Carolina	Mike Marlar ($12,000)	Ross Bailes		
20	Jun 14	Grassy Smith Memorial - Cherokee Speedway, Gaffney, South Carolina	Mike Marlar ($12,000)	Chris Ferguson		31 cars entered
21	Jun 15	Big Daddy 60 - Smoky Mountain Speedway, Maryville, Tennessee	Hudson O'Neal ($15,000)	Mike Marlar	Josh Richards	Kyle Strickler
21	Jun 15	Big Daddy 60 - Smoky Mountain Speedway, Maryville, Tennessee	Hudson O'Neal ($15,000)	Hudson O'Neal	Dale McDowell	Tim McCreadie
21	Jun 15	Big Daddy 60 - Smoky Mountain Speedway, Maryville, Tennessee	Hudson O'Neal ($15,000)	Tim McCreadie		
21	Jun 15	Big Daddy 60 - Smoky Mountain Speedway, Maryville, Tennessee	Hudson O'Neal ($15,000)	Ricky Weiss		32 cars entered
22	Jun 28	Toyota Knoxville/Secret City Chrysler Dodge Jeep Ram/Ted Russell Ford 50 - Tazewell Speedway, Tazewell, Tennessee	Shanon Buckingham ($12,000)	Josh Richards	Stormy Scott	Josh Richards
22	Jun 28	Toyota Knoxville/Secret City Chrysler Dodge Jeep Ram/Ted Russell Ford 50 - Tazewell Speedway, Tazewell, Tennessee	Shanon Buckingham ($12,000)	Jimmy Owens		Jason Trammell
22	Jun 28	Toyota Knoxville/Secret City Chrysler Dodge Jeep Ram/Ted Russell Ford 50 - Tazewell Speedway, Tazewell, Tennessee	Shanon Buckingham ($12,000)	Jeff Wolfenbarger		27 cars entered
23	Jun 29	Ralph Latham Memorial - Florence Speedway, Union, Kentucky	Jonathan Davenport ($12,000)	Jimmy Owens	Trevor Landrum	Kyle Bronson
23	Jun 29	Ralph Latham Memorial - Florence Speedway, Union, Kentucky	Jonathan Davenport ($12,000)	Josh Richards	Stormy Scott	Jonathan Davenport
23	Jun 29	Ralph Latham Memorial - Florence Speedway, Union, Kentucky	Jonathan Davenport ($12,000)	Jonathan Davenport		
23	Jun 29	Ralph Latham Memorial - Florence Speedway, Union, Kentucky	Jonathan Davenport ($12,000)	Kent Robinson		44 cars entered
24	Jul 4	Independence 50 - Portsmouth Raceway Park, Portsmouth, Ohio	Mike Marlar ($12,000)	Devin Moran	Jason Jameson	Devin Moran
24	Jul 4	Independence 50 - Portsmouth Raceway Park, Portsmouth, Ohio	Mike Marlar ($12,000)	Josh Richards		Jimmy Owens
24	Jul 4	Independence 50 - Portsmouth Raceway Park, Portsmouth, Ohio	Mike Marlar ($12,000)	Mike Marlar		
24	Jul 4	Independence 50 - Portsmouth Raceway Park, Portsmouth, Ohio	Mike Marlar ($12,000)	Shanon Buckingham		29 cars entered
25	Jul 5	Topless 50 - Tyler County Speedway, Middlebourne, West Virginia	Tyler Erb ($12,000)	Devin Moran	Shane Hitt	Devin Moran
25	Jul 5	Topless 50 - Tyler County Speedway, Middlebourne, West Virginia	Tyler Erb ($12,000)	Josh Richards	Jacob Hawkins	Michael Norris
25	Jul 5	Topless 50 - Tyler County Speedway, Middlebourne, West Virginia	Tyler Erb ($12,000)	Tyler Erb		
25	Jul 5	Topless 50 - Tyler County Speedway, Middlebourne, West Virginia	Tyler Erb ($12,000)	Chris Ferguson		31 cars entered
26	Jul 11	Hoker Trucking 50 - Tri-City Speedway, Granite City, Illinois	Tyler Erb ($12,000)	Tyler Erb	Jonathan Davenport	Tyler Erb
26	Jul 11	Hoker Trucking 50 - Tri-City Speedway, Granite City, Illinois	Tyler Erb ($12,000)	Mike Marlar	Gordy Gundaker	Jimmy Owens
26	Jul 11	Hoker Trucking 50 - Tri-City Speedway, Granite City, Illinois	Tyler Erb ($12,000)	Jimmy Owens		
26	Jul 11	Hoker Trucking 50 - Tri-City Speedway, Granite City, Illinois	Tyler Erb ($12,000)	Earl Pearson Jr.		31 cars entered
27	Jul 12	NAPA Know How 50 - Tri-City Speedway, Granite City, Illinois	Jimmy Owens ($12,000)	Jimmy Owens	Tyler Erb	Billy Moyer Jr.
27	Jul 12	NAPA Know How 50 - Tri-City Speedway, Granite City, Illinois	Jimmy Owens ($12,000)	Shannon Babb	Austin Rettig	Scott Bloomquist
27	Jul 12	NAPA Know How 50 - Tri-City Speedway, Granite City, Illinois	Jimmy Owens ($12,000)	Jonathan Davenport		
27	Jul 12	NAPA Know How 50 - Tri-City Speedway, Granite City, Illinois	Jimmy Owens ($12,000)	Stormy Scott		32 cars entered
28	Jul 13	Diamond Nationals - Lucas Oil Speedway, Wheatland, Missouri	Jimmy Owens ($15,000)	Scott Bloomquist	Shannon Babb	Scott Bloomquist
28	Jul 13	Diamond Nationals - Lucas Oil Speedway, Wheatland, Missouri	Jimmy Owens ($15,000)	Jake Neal	Shanon Buckingham	Earl Pearson Jr.
28	Jul 13	Diamond Nationals - Lucas Oil Speedway, Wheatland, Missouri	Jimmy Owens ($15,000)	Earl Pearson Jr.		
28	Jul 13	Diamond Nationals - Lucas Oil Speedway, Wheatland, Missouri	Jimmy Owens ($15,000)	Tony Jackson Jr.		39 cars entered
29	Jul 14	Diamond Nationals - Lucas Oil Speedway, Wheatland, Missouri	Jonathan Davenport ($15,000)	Jonathan Davenport	Josh Richards	Jonathan Davenport
29	Jul 14	Diamond Nationals - Lucas Oil Speedway, Wheatland, Missouri	Jonathan Davenport ($15,000)	Scott Bloomquist	Austin Rettig	Kyle Bronson
29	Jul 14	Diamond Nationals - Lucas Oil Speedway, Wheatland, Missouri	Jonathan Davenport ($15,000)	Tim McCreadie		
29	Jul 14	Diamond Nationals - Lucas Oil Speedway, Wheatland, Missouri	Jonathan Davenport ($15,000)	Shannon Babb		39 cars entered
30	Jul 16	Bullet Sportswear Shootout - Brown County Speedway, Aberdeen, South Dakota	Josh Richards ($10,000)	Brandon Sheppard		Brandon Sheppard
30	Jul 16	Bullet Sportswear Shootout - Brown County Speedway, Aberdeen, South Dakota	Josh Richards ($10,000)	Stormy Scott		Billy Moyer Jr.
30	Jul 16	Bullet Sportswear Shootout - Brown County Speedway, Aberdeen, South Dakota	Josh Richards ($10,000)	Kyle Bronson		24 cars entered
31	Jul 18	Malvern Bank Go 50 - I-80 Speedway, Greenwood, Nebraska	Jonathan Davenport ($12,000)	Tyler Bruening	Chris Madden	Jonathan Davenport
31	Jul 18	Malvern Bank Go 50 - I-80 Speedway, Greenwood, Nebraska	Jonathan Davenport ($12,000)	Billy Moyer Jr.	Dale McDowell	Jimmy Owens
31	Jul 18	Malvern Bank Go 50 - I-80 Speedway, Greenwood, Nebraska	Jonathan Davenport ($12,000)	Mason Zeigler		
31	Jul 18	Malvern Bank Go 50 - I-80 Speedway, Greenwood, Nebraska	Jonathan Davenport ($12,000)	Tyler Erb		45 cars entered
32	Jul 19-20	Silver Dollar Nationals - I-80 Speedway, Greenwood, Nebraska	Bobby Pierce ($53,000)	Earl Pearson Jr.	Josh Richards	
32	Jul 19-20	Silver Dollar Nationals - I-80 Speedway, Greenwood, Nebraska	Bobby Pierce ($53,000)	Tim McCreadie	Ricky Weiss	
32	Jul 19-20	Silver Dollar Nationals - I-80 Speedway, Greenwood, Nebraska	Bobby Pierce ($53,000)	Chris Madden		
32	Jul 19-20	Silver Dollar Nationals - I-80 Speedway, Greenwood, Nebraska	Bobby Pierce ($53,000)	Jonathan Davenport		
32	Jul 19-20	Silver Dollar Nationals - I-80 Speedway, Greenwood, Nebraska	Bobby Pierce ($53,000)	Bill Leighton Jr.		
32	Jul 19-20	Silver Dollar Nationals - I-80 Speedway, Greenwood, Nebraska	Bobby Pierce ($53,000)	Jimmy Owens		
32	Jul 19-20	Silver Dollar Nationals - I-80 Speedway, Greenwood, Nebraska	Bobby Pierce ($53,000)	Billy Moyer		
32	Jul 19-20	Silver Dollar Nationals - I-80 Speedway, Greenwood, Nebraska	Bobby Pierce ($53,000)	Devin Moran		
32	Jul 19-20	Silver Dollar Nationals - I-80 Speedway, Greenwood, Nebraska	Bobby Pierce ($53,000)	Mason Zeigler		
32	Jul 19-20	Silver Dollar Nationals - I-80 Speedway, Greenwood, Nebraska	Bobby Pierce ($53,000)	Ricky Weiss		50 cars entered
33	Aug 8	North/South Shootout - Florence Speedway, Union, Kentucky	Chris Madden ($10,000)	Chris Madden	Ricky Weiss	Chris Madden
33	Aug 8	North/South Shootout - Florence Speedway, Union, Kentucky	Chris Madden ($10,000)	Frank Heckenast Jr.	Victor Lee	Devin Gilpin
33	Aug 8	North/South Shootout - Florence Speedway, Union, Kentucky	Chris Madden ($10,000)	Jimmy Owens		
33	Aug 8	North/South Shootout - Florence Speedway, Union, Kentucky	Chris Madden ($10,000)	Zack Dohm		
33	Aug 8	North/South Shootout - Florence Speedway, Union, Kentucky	Chris Madden ($10,000)	Michael Norris		
33	Aug 8	North/South Shootout - Florence Speedway, Union, Kentucky	Chris Madden ($10,000)	Tim McCreadie		52 cars entered
34	Aug 9-10	North/South 100 - Florence Speedway, Union, Kentucky	Chris Madden ($50,000)	Mike Marlar	Mike Benedum	
34	Aug 9-10	North/South 100 - Florence Speedway, Union, Kentucky	Chris Madden ($50,000)	Zak Blackwood	Nick Hoffman	
34	Aug 9-10	North/South 100 - Florence Speedway, Union, Kentucky	Chris Madden ($50,000)	Frank Heckenast Jr.		
34	Aug 9-10	North/South 100 - Florence Speedway, Union, Kentucky	Chris Madden ($50,000)	Hudson O'Neal		
34	Aug 9-10	North/South 100 - Florence Speedway, Union, Kentucky	Chris Madden ($50,000)	Jimmy Owens		
34	Aug 9-10	North/South 100 - Florence Speedway, Union, Kentucky	Chris Madden ($50,000)	Kyle Bronson		
34	Aug 9-10	North/South 100 - Florence Speedway, Union, Kentucky	Chris Madden ($50,000)	Mike Benedum		
34	Aug 9-10	North/South 100 - Florence Speedway, Union, Kentucky	Chris Madden ($50,000)	Bobby Pierce		
34	Aug 9-10	North/South 100 - Florence Speedway, Union, Kentucky	Chris Madden ($50,000)	Earl Pearson Jr.		
34	Aug 9-10	North/South 100 - Florence Speedway, Union, Kentucky	Chris Madden ($50,000)	Scott Bloomquist		
34	Aug 9-10	North/South 100 - Florence Speedway, Union, Kentucky	Chris Madden ($50,000)	Stormy Scott		
34	Aug 9-10	North/South 100 - Florence Speedway, Union, Kentucky	Chris Madden ($50,000)	Jimmy Owens		53 cars entered
35	Aug 15	Topless 100 Prelim - Batesville Motor Speedway, Locust Grove, Arkansas	Chris Madden ($5,000)	Mike Marlar	Devin Moran	Mike Marlar
35	Aug 15	Topless 100 Prelim - Batesville Motor Speedway, Locust Grove, Arkansas	Chris Madden ($5,000)	Brandon Overton	Tony Jackson Jr.	Chris Madden
35	Aug 15	Topless 100 Prelim - Batesville Motor Speedway, Locust Grove, Arkansas	Chris Madden ($5,000)	Chris Madden		
35	Aug 15	Topless 100 Prelim - Batesville Motor Speedway, Locust Grove, Arkansas	Chris Madden ($5,000)	Jonathan Davenport		47 cars entered
36	Aug 16	Topless 100 Prelim - Batesville Motor Speedway, Locust Grove, Arkansas	Scott Bloomquist ($5,000)	Scott Bloomquist	Devin Moran	Scott Bloomquist
36	Aug 16	Topless 100 Prelim - Batesville Motor Speedway, Locust Grove, Arkansas	Scott Bloomquist ($5,000)	Michael Norris	Tim McCreadie	Chris Madden
36	Aug 16	Topless 100 Prelim - Batesville Motor Speedway, Locust Grove, Arkansas	Scott Bloomquist ($5,000)	Chris Madden		
36	Aug 16	Topless 100 Prelim - Batesville Motor Speedway, Locust Grove, Arkansas	Scott Bloomquist ($5,000)	Mike Marlar		46 cars entered
37	Aug 17	Topless 100 - Batesville Motor Speedway, Locust Grove, Arkansas	Chris Madden ($40,000)		Timothy Culp	
37	Aug 17	Topless 100 - Batesville Motor Speedway, Locust Grove, Arkansas	Chris Madden ($40,000)		Tyler Erb	47 cars entered
38	Aug 22	Dirt Million Duel 1 - Mansfield Motor Speedway, Mansfield, Ohio	Scott Bloomquist ($10,000)	Josh Richards	Billy Moyer Jr.	
38	Aug 22	Dirt Million Duel 1 - Mansfield Motor Speedway, Mansfield, Ohio	Scott Bloomquist ($10,000)	Michael Norris		
38	Aug 22	Dirt Million Duel 1 - Mansfield Motor Speedway, Mansfield, Ohio	Scott Bloomquist ($10,000)	Scott Bloomquist		28 cars entered
	Aug 22	Dirt Million Duel 2 - Mansfield Motor Speedway, Mansfield, Ohio	Jonathan Davenport ($10,000)	Mike Marlar	Stormy Scott	
	Aug 22	Dirt Million Duel 2 - Mansfield Motor Speedway, Mansfield, Ohio	Jonathan Davenport ($10,000)	Jonathan Davenport		
	Aug 22	Dirt Million Duel 2 - Mansfield Motor Speedway, Mansfield, Ohio	Jonathan Davenport ($10,000)	Ricky Weiss		28 cars entered
39	Aug 23	Dirt Million Duel 1 - Mansfield Motor Speedway, Mansfield, Ohio	Brandon Sheppard ($10,000)	Jimmy Owens	Stormy Scott	Jimmy Owens
39	Aug 23	Dirt Million Duel 1 - Mansfield Motor Speedway, Mansfield, Ohio	Brandon Sheppard ($10,000)	Brandon Sheppard		
39	Aug 23	Dirt Million Duel 1 - Mansfield Motor Speedway, Mansfield, Ohio	Brandon Sheppard ($10,000)	Kent Robinson		28 cars entered
	Aug 23	Dirt Million Duel 2 - Mansfield Motor Speedway, Mansfield, Ohio	Mike Marlar ($10,000)	Chase Junghans	Dale McDowell	Tyler Erb
	Aug 23	Dirt Million Duel 2 - Mansfield Motor Speedway, Mansfield, Ohio	Mike Marlar ($10,000)	Mike Marlar		
	Aug 23	Dirt Million Duel 2 - Mansfield Motor Speedway, Mansfield, Ohio	Mike Marlar ($10,000)	Michael Norris		28 cars entered
40	Aug 24	Dirt Million - Mansfield Motor Speedway, Mansfield, Ohio	Brandon Sheppard ($101,620)	Josh Richards	Brandon Overton	
40	Aug 24	Dirt Million - Mansfield Motor Speedway, Mansfield, Ohio	Brandon Sheppard ($101,620)	Ricky Weiss	Dave Brown	
40	Aug 24	Dirt Million - Mansfield Motor Speedway, Mansfield, Ohio	Brandon Sheppard ($101,620)	Jimmy Owens	Shane Clanton	
40	Aug 24	Dirt Million - Mansfield Motor Speedway, Mansfield, Ohio	Brandon Sheppard ($101,620)	Tim McCreadie		
40	Aug 24	Dirt Million - Mansfield Motor Speedway, Mansfield, Ohio	Brandon Sheppard ($101,620)	Tyler Erb		
40	Aug 24	Dirt Million - Mansfield Motor Speedway, Mansfield, Ohio	Brandon Sheppard ($101,620)	Earl Pearson Jr.		56 cars entered
41	Aug 30	John Bradshaw Memorial - Ponderosa Speedway, Junction City, Kentucky	Tim McCreadie ($12,000)	Billy Moyer Jr.	Johnny Scott	Mike Marlar
41	Aug 30	John Bradshaw Memorial - Ponderosa Speedway, Junction City, Kentucky	Tim McCreadie ($12,000)	Tim McCreadie		Tim McCreadie
41	Aug 30	John Bradshaw Memorial - Ponderosa Speedway, Junction City, Kentucky	Tim McCreadie ($12,000)	Kyle Strickler		27 cars entered
42	Aug 31	Bob Miller Memorial - Portsmouth Raceway Park, Portsmouth, Ohio	Jonathan Davenport ($12,000)	Tyler Erb	Jason Jameson	Tyler Erb
42	Aug 31	Bob Miller Memorial - Portsmouth Raceway Park, Portsmouth, Ohio	Jonathan Davenport ($12,000)	Josh Richards		Tim McCreadie
42	Aug 31	Bob Miller Memorial - Portsmouth Raceway Park, Portsmouth, Ohio	Jonathan Davenport ($12,000)	Jonathan Davenport		
42	Aug 31	Bob Miller Memorial - Portsmouth Raceway Park, Portsmouth, Ohio	Jonathan Davenport ($12,000)	Brandon Fouts		30 cars entered
43	Sep 1	Hillbilly 100 - Tyler County Speedway, Middlebourne, West Virginia	Josh Richards ($30,000)	Josh Richards	Shane Hitt	Tim McCreadie
43	Sep 1	Hillbilly 100 - Tyler County Speedway, Middlebourne, West Virginia	Josh Richards ($30,000)	Jimmy Owens	Chase Junghans	Tyler Erb
43	Sep 1	Hillbilly 100 - Tyler County Speedway, Middlebourne, West Virginia	Josh Richards ($30,000)	Tanner English		
43	Sep 1	Hillbilly 100 - Tyler County Speedway, Middlebourne, West Virginia	Josh Richards ($30,000)	Jonathan Davenport		34 cars entered
44	Sep 12	Knoxville Late Model Nationals - Knoxville Raceway, Knoxville, Iowa	Shane Clanton ($7,000)	Shanon Buckingham	Stormy Scott	Shane Clanton
44	Sep 12	Knoxville Late Model Nationals - Knoxville Raceway, Knoxville, Iowa	Shane Clanton ($7,000)	Bobby Pierce	Jimmy Owens	Jimmy Owens
44	Sep 12	Knoxville Late Model Nationals - Knoxville Raceway, Knoxville, Iowa	Shane Clanton ($7,000)	Ricky Thornton Jr.		
44	Sep 12	Knoxville Late Model Nationals - Knoxville Raceway, Knoxville, Iowa	Shane Clanton ($7,000)	Shannon Babb		
44	Sep 12	Knoxville Late Model Nationals - Knoxville Raceway, Knoxville, Iowa	Shane Clanton ($7,000)	Josh Richards		
44	Sep 12	Knoxville Late Model Nationals - Knoxville Raceway, Knoxville, Iowa	Shane Clanton ($7,000)	Brandon Sheppard		55 cars entered
45	Sep 13	Knoxville Late Model Nationals - Knoxville Raceway, Knoxville, Iowa	Ricky Weiss ($7,000)	Shannon Babb	Jonathan Davenport	Scott Bloomquist
45	Sep 13	Knoxville Late Model Nationals - Knoxville Raceway, Knoxville, Iowa	Ricky Weiss ($7,000)	Josh Richards	Shane Clanton	Chris Simpson
45	Sep 13	Knoxville Late Model Nationals - Knoxville Raceway, Knoxville, Iowa	Ricky Weiss ($7,000)	Ricky Weiss		
45	Sep 13	Knoxville Late Model Nationals - Knoxville Raceway, Knoxville, Iowa	Ricky Weiss ($7,000)	Darrell Lanigan		
45	Sep 13	Knoxville Late Model Nationals - Knoxville Raceway, Knoxville, Iowa	Ricky Weiss ($7,000)	Chris Madden		
45	Sep 13	Knoxville Late Model Nationals - Knoxville Raceway, Knoxville, Iowa	Ricky Weiss ($7,000)	Frank Heckenast Jr.		54 cars entered
46	Sep 14	Knoxville Late Model Nationals - Knoxville Raceway, Knoxville, Iowa	Jimmy Owens ($40,000)		Brian Birkhofer	55 cars entered
47	Sep 20	Kokomo Late Model Shootout - Kokomo Speedway, Kokomo, Indiana	Tyler Erb ($12,000)	Billy Moyer Jr.		Billy Moyer Jr.
47	Sep 20	Kokomo Late Model Shootout - Kokomo Speedway, Kokomo, Indiana	Tyler Erb ($12,000)	Tyler Erb		Frank Heckenast Jr.
47	Sep 20	Kokomo Late Model Shootout - Kokomo Speedway, Kokomo, Indiana	Tyler Erb ($12,000)	Hudson O'Neal		24 cars entered
48	Sep 21	Jackson 100 - Brownstown Speedway, Brownstown, Indiana	Hudson O'Neal ($15,000)	Devin Moran	Shanon Buckingham	Bobby Pierce
48	Sep 21	Jackson 100 - Brownstown Speedway, Brownstown, Indiana	Hudson O'Neal ($15,000)	Johnny Scott	Jimmy Owens	Mike Marlar
48	Sep 21	Jackson 100 - Brownstown Speedway, Brownstown, Indiana	Hudson O'Neal ($15,000)	Mike Marlar		
48	Sep 21	Jackson 100 - Brownstown Speedway, Brownstown, Indiana	Hudson O'Neal ($15,000)	Hudson O'Neal		34 cars entered
49	Oct 4	Raceway 7, Conneaut, Ohio	Kyle Bronson ($12,000)	Josh Richards	Shanon Buckingham	Don O'Neal
49	Oct 4	Raceway 7, Conneaut, Ohio	Kyle Bronson ($12,000)	Jimmy Owens	Johnny Scott	Devin Moran
49	Oct 4	Raceway 7, Conneaut, Ohio	Kyle Bronson ($12,000)	Kyle Bronson		
49	Oct 4	Raceway 7, Conneaut, Ohio	Kyle Bronson ($12,000)	Jonathan Davenport		32 cars entered
50	Oct 5	Pittsburgher 100 - Pittsburgh's PA Motor Speedway, Imperial, Pennsylvania	Don O'Neal ($20,000)	Shanon Buckingham	Tyler Erb	Tim McCreadie
50	Oct 5	Pittsburgher 100 - Pittsburgh's PA Motor Speedway, Imperial, Pennsylvania	Don O'Neal ($20,000)	Michael Norris	Chub Frank	Jonathan Davenport
50	Oct 5	Pittsburgher 100 - Pittsburgh's PA Motor Speedway, Imperial, Pennsylvania	Don O'Neal ($20,000)	Jonathan Davenport		
50	Oct 5	Pittsburgher 100 - Pittsburgh's PA Motor Speedway, Imperial, Pennsylvania	Don O'Neal ($20,000)	Hudson O'Neal		37 cars entered
51	Oct 12	Dixie Shootout - Dixie Speedway, Woodstock, Georgia	Michael Page ($12,000)	Jimmy Owens	Kyle Bronson	Jimmy Owens
51	Oct 12	Dixie Shootout - Dixie Speedway, Woodstock, Georgia	Michael Page ($12,000)	Dale McDowell	Stormy Scott	Michael Page
51	Oct 12	Dixie Shootout - Dixie Speedway, Woodstock, Georgia	Michael Page ($12,000)	Michael Page		
51	Oct 12	Dixie Shootout - Dixie Speedway, Woodstock, Georgia	Michael Page ($12,000)	Jonathan Davenport		39 cars entered
52	Oct 18-19	Dirt Track World Championship - Portsmouth Raceway Park, Portsmouth, Ohio	Brandon Sheppard ($100,000)	Scott James	Scott Bloomquist	Chris Ferguson
52	Oct 18-19	Dirt Track World Championship - Portsmouth Raceway Park, Portsmouth, Ohio	Brandon Sheppard ($100,000)	Jonathan Davenport	Don O'Neal	Jimmy Owens
52	Oct 18-19	Dirt Track World Championship - Portsmouth Raceway Park, Portsmouth, Ohio	Brandon Sheppard ($100,000)	Scott Bloomquist		
52	Oct 18-19	Dirt Track World Championship - Portsmouth Raceway Park, Portsmouth, Ohio	Brandon Sheppard ($100,000)	Don O'Neal		
52	Oct 18-19	Dirt Track World Championship - Portsmouth Raceway Park, Portsmouth, Ohio	Brandon Sheppard ($100,000)	Shane Clanton		
52	Oct 18-19	Dirt Track World Championship - Portsmouth Raceway Park, Portsmouth, Ohio	Brandon Sheppard ($100,000)	Bobby Pierce		66 cars entered

=== Schedule notes and changes ===
- The Super Bowl of Racing scheduled for February 1 at the Golden Isles Raceway in Brunswick, Georgia was postponed due to rain.
- On March 15, the Buckeye Spring 50 at Atomic Speedway in Chillicothe, Ohio was postponed mid-program due to rain. The race was rescheduled for April 11.
- The Steel Valley 50 scheduled for April 12 at Sharon Speedway was rained out.
- The Rumble by the River scheduled for April 14 at Port Royal Speedway was canceled due to a wet forecast.
- On April 25, rain forced the Hoker Trucking 50 at Tri-City Speedway in Granite City, Illinois to be rescheduled to July 11 and the scheduled race at Macon Speedway to be rescheduled to July 23.
- On May 2, the LOLMDS announced that the scheduled race at Tazewell Speedway was rescheduled to June 28, and the Ralph Latham Memorial at the Florence Speedway was rescheduled to June 29 in response to a wet forecast.
- The North Star Nationals scheduled for May 18 at Deer Creek Speedway in Spring Valley, Minnesota was rained out.
- On May 21, the LOLMDS announced that the Show-Me 100 at Lucas Oil Speedway in Wheatland, Missouri was being postponed due to tornado damage to the facility. The race was canceled on May 28.
- On July 3, the LOLMDS race at Muskingum County Speedway was rained out.
- The Freedom 50 at Mansfield Motor Speedway scheduled for July 6 was rained out.
- The LOLMDS race at the Jackson Motorplex in Minnesota scheduled for July 17 was rained out.
