= 2020 Lucas Oil Late Model Dirt Series =

15th season of American touring series

The 2020 Lucas Oil Late Model Dirt Series was the 15th season of the Lucas Oil Late Model Dirt Series, a national touring series for dirt late models owned & operated by Lucas Oil. The series began with the Super Bowl of Racing at Golden Isles Speedway on February 1, and ended with the Dirt Track World Championship at Portsmouth Raceway Park on October 17. Jimmy Owens won the 2020 drivers' championship. Tanner English was crowned 2020 Rookie of the Year.

== Teams and drivers ==
=== Complete schedule ===
| No. | Race driver | Team |
|---|---|---|
| 1 | Earl Pearson Jr. | Black Diamond Racing |
| 1T | Tyler Erb | Best Performance Motorsports |
| 9 | Devin Moran | Tye Twarog Racing |
| 14 | Josh Richards | Clint Bowyer Racing |
| 20 | Jimmy Owens | Ramirez Motorsports |
| 21 | Billy Moyer | Billy Moyer Racing |
| 25 | Shane Clanton | Skyline Motorsports |
| 39 | Tim McCreadie | Paylor Motorsports |
| 40B | Kyle Bronson | Kyle Bronson Motorsports |
| 49 | Jonathan Davenport | Double L Motorsports |
| 81E | Tanner English | Riggs Motorsports |

== Schedule and results ==
The 2020 schedule was released on October 19, 2019.

| No. | Date | Race / Track | Winning driver | Heat winner | B-Main winner | Fastest Qualifier |
|---|---|---|---|---|---|---|
| 1 | Feb 1 | Super Bowl of Racing - Golden Isles Speedway, Waynesville, Georgia | Tim McCreadie ($12,000) | Tim McCreadie | Johnny Scott | Tim McCreadie |
| 1 | Feb 1 | Super Bowl of Racing - Golden Isles Speedway, Waynesville, Georgia | Tim McCreadie ($12,000) | Jonathan Davenport | Mason Zeigler | Devin Moran |
| 1 | Feb 1 | Super Bowl of Racing - Golden Isles Speedway, Waynesville, Georgia | Tim McCreadie ($12,000) | Devin Moran | | |
| 1 | Feb 1 | Super Bowl of Racing - Golden Isles Speedway, Waynesville, Georgia | Tim McCreadie ($12,000) | Mike Marlar | | 45 cars entered |
| 2 | Feb 3 | Winternationals - East Bay Raceway Park, Tampa, Florida | Devin Moran ($5,000) | Tim McCreadie | Shane Clanton | Tim McCreadie |
| 2 | Feb 3 | Winternationals - East Bay Raceway Park, Tampa, Florida | Devin Moran ($5,000) | Brandon Sheppard | Chase Junghans | Devin Moran |
| 2 | Feb 3 | Winternationals - East Bay Raceway Park, Tampa, Florida | Devin Moran ($5,000) | Jimmy Owens | | |
| 2 | Feb 3 | Winternationals - East Bay Raceway Park, Tampa, Florida | Devin Moran ($5,000) | Devin Moran | | |
| 2 | Feb 3 | Winternationals - East Bay Raceway Park, Tampa, Florida | Devin Moran ($5,000) | Jeff Mathews | | |
| 2 | Feb 3 | Winternationals - East Bay Raceway Park, Tampa, Florida | Devin Moran ($5,000) | GR Smith | | 62 cars entered |
| 3 | Feb 4 | Winternationals - East Bay Raceway Park, Tampa, Florida | Brandon Sheppard ($5,000) | Tim Dohm | Shanon Buckingham | Boom Briggs |
| 3 | Feb 4 | Winternationals - East Bay Raceway Park, Tampa, Florida | Brandon Sheppard ($5,000) | Jonathan Davenport | Chase Junghans | Chase Junghans |
| 3 | Feb 4 | Winternationals - East Bay Raceway Park, Tampa, Florida | Brandon Sheppard ($5,000) | Hudson O'Neal | Shane Clanton | |
| 3 | Feb 4 | Winternationals - East Bay Raceway Park, Tampa, Florida | Brandon Sheppard ($5,000) | Brandon Sheppard | | |
| 3 | Feb 4 | Winternationals - East Bay Raceway Park, Tampa, Florida | Brandon Sheppard ($5,000) | Tyler Erb | | |
| 3 | Feb 4 | Winternationals - East Bay Raceway Park, Tampa, Florida | Brandon Sheppard ($5,000) | Mike Marlar | | 61 cars entered |
| 4 | Feb 5 | Winternationals - East Bay Raceway Park, Tampa, Florida | Tim McCreadie ($7,000) | Tim McCreadie | Jadon Frame | Tim McCreadie |
| 4 | Feb 5 | Winternationals - East Bay Raceway Park, Tampa, Florida | Tim McCreadie ($7,000) | Kyle Bronson | Brian Shirley | Jonathan Davenport |
| 4 | Feb 5 | Winternationals - East Bay Raceway Park, Tampa, Florida | Tim McCreadie ($7,000) | Brandon Overton | Logan Roberson | |
| 4 | Feb 5 | Winternationals - East Bay Raceway Park, Tampa, Florida | Tim McCreadie ($7,000) | Jonathan Davenport | | |
| 4 | Feb 5 | Winternationals - East Bay Raceway Park, Tampa, Florida | Tim McCreadie ($7,000) | Dennis Erb Jr. | | |
| 4 | Feb 5 | Winternationals - East Bay Raceway Park, Tampa, Florida | Tim McCreadie ($7,000) | Boom Briggs | | 65 cars entered |
| 5 | Feb 6 | Winternationals - East Bay Raceway Park, Tampa, Florida | Brandon Sheppard ($7,000) | Brandon Overton | Jadon Frame | Brandon Overton |
| 5 | Feb 6 | Winternationals - East Bay Raceway Park, Tampa, Florida | Brandon Sheppard ($7,000) | Boom Briggs | Josh Richards | Tim McCreadie |
| 5 | Feb 6 | Winternationals - East Bay Raceway Park, Tampa, Florida | Brandon Sheppard ($7,000) | Jimmy Owens | Chase Junghans | |
| 5 | Feb 6 | Winternationals - East Bay Raceway Park, Tampa, Florida | Brandon Sheppard ($7,000) | Tim McCreadie | | |
| 5 | Feb 6 | Winternationals - East Bay Raceway Park, Tampa, Florida | Brandon Sheppard ($7,000) | Kyle Bronson | | |
| 5 | Feb 6 | Winternationals - East Bay Raceway Park, Tampa, Florida | Brandon Sheppard ($7,000) | Billy Moyer Jr. | | 57 cars entered |
| 6 | Feb 7 | Winternationals - East Bay Raceway Park, Tampa, Florida | Mason Zeigler ($12,000) | Tyler Erb | Tanner English | Tyler Erb |
| 6 | Feb 7 | Winternationals - East Bay Raceway Park, Tampa, Florida | Mason Zeigler ($12,000) | Kyle Bronson | Billy Moyer | Billy Moyer Jr. |
| 6 | Feb 7 | Winternationals - East Bay Raceway Park, Tampa, Florida | Mason Zeigler ($12,000) | Jonathan Davenport | Colton Flinner | |
| 6 | Feb 7 | Winternationals - East Bay Raceway Park, Tampa, Florida | Mason Zeigler ($12,000) | Brandon Sheppard | | |
| 6 | Feb 7 | Winternationals - East Bay Raceway Park, Tampa, Florida | Mason Zeigler ($12,000) | Jimmy Owens | | |
| 6 | Feb 7 | Winternationals - East Bay Raceway Park, Tampa, Florida | Mason Zeigler ($12,000) | Tim McCreadie | | 57 cars entered |
| 7 | Feb 8 | Winternationals - East Bay Raceway Park, Tampa, Florida | Brandon Sheppard ($12,000) | Devin Moran | Jonathan Davenport | Jonathan Davenport |
| 7 | Feb 8 | Winternationals - East Bay Raceway Park, Tampa, Florida | Brandon Sheppard ($12,000) | Shane Clanton | Matt Cosner | Billy Moyer Jr. |
| 7 | Feb 8 | Winternationals - East Bay Raceway Park, Tampa, Florida | Brandon Sheppard ($12,000) | Josh Richards | Tanner English | |
| 7 | Feb 8 | Winternationals - East Bay Raceway Park, Tampa, Florida | Brandon Sheppard ($12,000) | Billy Moyer Jr. | | |
| 7 | Feb 8 | Winternationals - East Bay Raceway Park, Tampa, Florida | Brandon Sheppard ($12,000) | Jimmy Owens | | |
| 7 | Feb 8 | Winternationals - East Bay Raceway Park, Tampa, Florida | Brandon Sheppard ($12,000) | Brian Shirley | | 55 cars entered |
| 8 | Feb 9 | Lucas Oil Winter Nationals - All-Tech Raceway, Lake City, Florida | Jonathan Davenport ($10,000) | Tim McCreadie | Billy Moyer Jr. | Tim McCreadie |
| 8 | Feb 9 | Lucas Oil Winter Nationals - All-Tech Raceway, Lake City, Florida | Jonathan Davenport ($10,000) | Mark Whitener | Dennis Erb Jr. | Devin Moran |
| 8 | Feb 9 | Lucas Oil Winter Nationals - All-Tech Raceway, Lake City, Florida | Jonathan Davenport ($10,000) | Devin Moran | | |
| 8 | Feb 9 | Lucas Oil Winter Nationals - All-Tech Raceway, Lake City, Florida | Jonathan Davenport ($10,000) | Jonathan Davenport | | 34 cars entered |
| 9 | May 19 | Golden Isles Nationals - Golden Isles Speedway, Waynesville, Georgia | Jimmy Owens ($7,000) | Josh Richards | Mark Whitener | Josh Richards |
| 9 | May 19 | Golden Isles Nationals - Golden Isles Speedway, Waynesville, Georgia | Jimmy Owens ($7,000) | Tim McCreadie | Jonathan Davenport | Brandon Overton |
| 9 | May 19 | Golden Isles Nationals - Golden Isles Speedway, Waynesville, Georgia | Jimmy Owens ($7,000) | Brandon Overton | | |
| 9 | May 19 | Golden Isles Nationals - Golden Isles Speedway, Waynesville, Georgia | Jimmy Owens ($7,000) | Jimmy Owens | | 43 cars entered |
| 10 | May 20 | Golden Isles Nationals - Golden Isles Speedway, Waynesville, Georgia | Kyle Bronson ($7,000) | Josh Richards | Rick Eckert | Jonathan Davenport |
| 10 | May 20 | Golden Isles Nationals - Golden Isles Speedway, Waynesville, Georgia | Kyle Bronson ($7,000) | Jimmy Owens | Brandon Sheppard | Devin Moran |
| 10 | May 20 | Golden Isles Nationals - Golden Isles Speedway, Waynesville, Georgia | Kyle Bronson ($7,000) | Devin Moran | | |
| 10 | May 20 | Golden Isles Nationals - Golden Isles Speedway, Waynesville, Georgia | Kyle Bronson ($7,000) | Tyler Bruening | | 39 cars entered |
| 11 | May 21 | Golden Isles Nationals - Golden Isles Speedway, Waynesville, Georgia | Josh Richards ($7,000) | Brandon Overton | Stormy Scott | Brandon Overton |
| 11 | May 21 | Golden Isles Nationals - Golden Isles Speedway, Waynesville, Georgia | Josh Richards ($7,000) | Josh Richards | Shane Clanton | Tim McCreadie |
| 11 | May 21 | Golden Isles Nationals - Golden Isles Speedway, Waynesville, Georgia | Josh Richards ($7,000) | Tim McCreadie | | |
| 11 | May 21 | Golden Isles Nationals - Golden Isles Speedway, Waynesville, Georgia | Josh Richards ($7,000) | Steven Roberts | | 36 cars entered |
| 12 | May 25 | East Bay Nationals - East Bay Raceway Park, Tampa, Florida | Jonathan Davenport ($7,000) | Shane Clanton | Billy Moyer Jr. | Shane Clanton |
| 12 | May 25 | East Bay Nationals - East Bay Raceway Park, Tampa, Florida | Jonathan Davenport ($7,000) | Tim McCreadie | Ross Robinson | Brandon Overton |
| 12 | May 25 | East Bay Nationals - East Bay Raceway Park, Tampa, Florida | Jonathan Davenport ($7,000) | Brandon Overton | | |
| 12 | May 25 | East Bay Nationals - East Bay Raceway Park, Tampa, Florida | Jonathan Davenport ($7,000) | Jimmy Owens | | 34 cars entered |
| 13 | May 26 | East Bay Nationals - East Bay Raceway Park, Tampa, Florida | Brandon Overton ($7,000) | Brandon Overton | Brian Shirley | Brandon Overton |
| 13 | May 26 | East Bay Nationals - East Bay Raceway Park, Tampa, Florida | Brandon Overton ($7,000) | Jonathan Davenport | Kyle Bronson | Jimmy Owens |
| 13 | May 26 | East Bay Nationals - East Bay Raceway Park, Tampa, Florida | Brandon Overton ($7,000) | Jimmy Owens | | |
| 13 | May 26 | East Bay Nationals - East Bay Raceway Park, Tampa, Florida | Brandon Overton ($7,000) | Tim McCreadie | | 31 cars entered |
| 14 | May 27 | East Bay Nationals - East Bay Raceway Park, Tampa, Florida | Brandon Overton ($7,000) | Jimmy Owens | Jonathan Davenport | Jimmy Owens |
| 14 | May 27 | East Bay Nationals - East Bay Raceway Park, Tampa, Florida | Brandon Overton ($7,000) | Tyler Erb | | Brandon Overton |
| 14 | May 27 | East Bay Nationals - East Bay Raceway Park, Tampa, Florida | Brandon Overton ($7,000) | Brandon Overton | | |
| 14 | May 27 | East Bay Nationals - East Bay Raceway Park, Tampa, Florida | Brandon Overton ($7,000) | Rick Eckert | | 29 cars entered |
| 15 | Jun 12 | Grassy Smith Memorial - Cherokee Speedway, Gaffney, South Carolina | Ross Bailes ($12,000) | Ross Bailes | Tyler Erb | Ross Bailes |
| 15 | Jun 12 | Grassy Smith Memorial - Cherokee Speedway, Gaffney, South Carolina | Ross Bailes ($12,000) | Brandon Overton | Christian Thomas | Chris Ferguson |
| 15 | Jun 12 | Grassy Smith Memorial - Cherokee Speedway, Gaffney, South Carolina | Ross Bailes ($12,000) | Chris Ferguson | | |
| 15 | Jun 12 | Grassy Smith Memorial - Cherokee Speedway, Gaffney, South Carolina | Ross Bailes ($12,000) | Kyle Strickler | | 37 cars entered |
| 16 | Jun 13 | Mountain Moonshine Classic - Smoky Mountain Speedway, Maryville, Tennessee | Brandon Overton ($15,000) | Brandon Sheppard | Thomas Kerr | Brandon Sheppard |
| 16 | Jun 13 | Mountain Moonshine Classic - Smoky Mountain Speedway, Maryville, Tennessee | Brandon Overton ($15,000) | Brandon Overton | Tyler Erb | Jimmy Owens |
| 16 | Jun 13 | Mountain Moonshine Classic - Smoky Mountain Speedway, Maryville, Tennessee | Brandon Overton ($15,000) | Jimmy Owens | | |
| 16 | Jun 13 | Mountain Moonshine Classic - Smoky Mountain Speedway, Maryville, Tennessee | Brandon Overton ($15,000) | Tim McCreadie | | 39 cars entered |
| 17 | Jun 18 | Clash at the Mag - Magnolia Motor Speedway, Columbus, Mississippi | Bobby Pierce ($5,000) | Jimmy Owens | Jonathan Davenport | Jimmy Owens |
| 17 | Jun 18 | Clash at the Mag - Magnolia Motor Speedway, Columbus, Mississippi | Bobby Pierce ($5,000) | Tyler Erb | Josh Richards | Frank Heckenast Jr. |
| 17 | Jun 18 | Clash at the Mag - Magnolia Motor Speedway, Columbus, Mississippi | Bobby Pierce ($5,000) | Shane Clanton | Scott Dedwylder | |
| 17 | Jun 18 | Clash at the Mag - Magnolia Motor Speedway, Columbus, Mississippi | Bobby Pierce ($5,000) | Bobby Pierce | | |
| 17 | Jun 18 | Clash at the Mag - Magnolia Motor Speedway, Columbus, Mississippi | Bobby Pierce ($5,000) | Ross Bailes | | |
| 17 | Jun 18 | Clash at the Mag - Magnolia Motor Speedway, Columbus, Mississippi | Bobby Pierce ($5,000) | Drew Armstrong | | 55 cars entered |
| 18 | Jun 19 | Clash at the Mag - Magnolia Motor Speedway, Columbus, Mississippi | Jimmy Owens ($5,000) | Jimmy Owens | Joseph Joiner | Jimmy Owens |
| 18 | Jun 19 | Clash at the Mag - Magnolia Motor Speedway, Columbus, Mississippi | Jimmy Owens ($5,000) | Chris Brown | Devin Gilpin | Tyler Erb |
| 18 | Jun 19 | Clash at the Mag - Magnolia Motor Speedway, Columbus, Mississippi | Jimmy Owens ($5,000) | Josh Richards | Bobby Pierce | |
| 18 | Jun 19 | Clash at the Mag - Magnolia Motor Speedway, Columbus, Mississippi | Jimmy Owens ($5,000) | Tyler Erb | | |
| 18 | Jun 19 | Clash at the Mag - Magnolia Motor Speedway, Columbus, Mississippi | Jimmy Owens ($5,000) | Billy Moyer | | |
| 18 | Jun 19 | Clash at the Mag - Magnolia Motor Speedway, Columbus, Mississippi | Jimmy Owens ($5,000) | Spencer Hughes | | 52 cars entered |
| 19 | Jun 20 | Clash at the Mag - Magnolia Motor Speedway, Columbus, Mississippi | Jimmy Owens ($15,000) | | Michael Arnold | |
| 19 | Jun 20 | Clash at the Mag - Magnolia Motor Speedway, Columbus, Mississippi | Jimmy Owens ($15,000) | | Shanon Buckingham | 52 cars entered |
| 20 | Jun 26 | Tennessee's Action Track 50 - 411 Motor Speedway, Seymour, Tennessee | Jimmy Owens ($12,000) | Jimmy Owens | Tanner English | Jimmy Owens |
| 20 | Jun 26 | Tennessee's Action Track 50 - 411 Motor Speedway, Seymour, Tennessee | Jimmy Owens ($12,000) | Donald McIntosh | Kyle Bronson | Shanon Buckingham |
| 20 | Jun 26 | Tennessee's Action Track 50 - 411 Motor Speedway, Seymour, Tennessee | Jimmy Owens ($12,000) | Jonathan Davenport | | |
| 20 | Jun 26 | Tennessee's Action Track 50 - 411 Motor Speedway, Seymour, Tennessee | Jimmy Owens ($12,000) | Shane Clanton | | 38 cars entered |
| 21 | Jun 27 | EZ-Go 50 - Talladega Short Track, Eastaboga, Alabama | Jimmy Owens ($12,000) | Jonathan Davenport | Shanon Buckingham | Jonathan Davenport |
| 21 | Jun 27 | EZ-Go 50 - Talladega Short Track, Eastaboga, Alabama | Jimmy Owens ($12,000) | Josh Richards | Tyler Erb | Tim McCreadie |
| 21 | Jun 27 | EZ-Go 50 - Talladega Short Track, Eastaboga, Alabama | Jimmy Owens ($12,000) | Jimmy Owens | | |
| 21 | Jun 27 | EZ-Go 50 - Talladega Short Track, Eastaboga, Alabama | Jimmy Owens ($12,000) | Hudson O'Neal | | 42 cars entered |
| 22 | Jul 3 | Freedom 50 - Muskingum County Speedway, Zanesville, Ohio | Tyler Erb ($12,000) | Jonathan Davenport | Jimmy Owens | Jimmy Owens |
| 22 | Jul 3 | Freedom 50 - Muskingum County Speedway, Zanesville, Ohio | Tyler Erb ($12,000) | Devin Moran | Kyle Hardy | Tyler Erb |
| 22 | Jul 3 | Freedom 50 - Muskingum County Speedway, Zanesville, Ohio | Tyler Erb ($12,000) | Tyler Erb | | |
| 22 | Jul 3 | Freedom 50 - Muskingum County Speedway, Zanesville, Ohio | Tyler Erb ($12,000) | Josh Richards | | 33 cars entered |
| 23 | Jul 4 | Independence 50 - Portsmouth Raceway Park, Portsmouth, Ohio | Jimmy Owens ($12,000) | Stormy Scott | Tanner English | Josh Richards |
| 23 | Jul 4 | Independence 50 - Portsmouth Raceway Park, Portsmouth, Ohio | Jimmy Owens ($12,000) | Jonathan Davenport | | Jimmy Owens |
| 23 | Jul 4 | Independence 50 - Portsmouth Raceway Park, Portsmouth, Ohio | Jimmy Owens ($12,000) | Jimmy Owens | | |
| 23 | Jul 4 | Independence 50 - Portsmouth Raceway Park, Portsmouth, Ohio | Jimmy Owens ($12,000) | Billy Moyer Jr. | | 30 cars entered |
| 24 | Jul 10 | Summer Sizzler Nationals - Florence Speedway, Union, Kentucky | Earl Pearson Jr. ($12,000) | Jonathan Davenport | Jared Hawkins | Jonathan Davenport |
| 24 | Jul 10 | Summer Sizzler Nationals - Florence Speedway, Union, Kentucky | Earl Pearson Jr. ($12,000) | Josh Richards | Shane Clanton | Earl Pearson Jr. |
| 24 | Jul 10 | Summer Sizzler Nationals - Florence Speedway, Union, Kentucky | Earl Pearson Jr. ($12,000) | Earl Pearson Jr. | | |
| 24 | Jul 10 | Summer Sizzler Nationals - Florence Speedway, Union, Kentucky | Earl Pearson Jr. ($12,000) | Jimmy Owens | | 33 cars entered |
| 25 | Jul 13 | Truck Country 50 - 300 Raceway, Farley, Iowa | Josh Richards ($10,000) | Josh Richards | Stormy Scott | Josh Richards |
| 25 | Jul 13 | Truck Country 50 - 300 Raceway, Farley, Iowa | Josh Richards ($10,000) | Kyle Bronson | | Stormy Scott |
| 25 | Jul 13 | Truck Country 50 - 300 Raceway, Farley, Iowa | Josh Richards ($10,000) | Billy Moyer Jr. | | 27 cars entered |
| 26 | Jul 17 | NAPA Know How 50 - Tri-City Speedway, Granite City, Illinois | Tyler Erb ($12,000) | Kyle Strickler | Jimmy Owens | Kolby Vandenbergh |
| 26 | Jul 17 | NAPA Know How 50 - Tri-City Speedway, Granite City, Illinois | Tyler Erb ($12,000) | Earl Pearson Jr. | Johnny Scott | Jonathan Davenport |
| 26 | Jul 17 | NAPA Know How 50 - Tri-City Speedway, Granite City, Illinois | Tyler Erb ($12,000) | Billy Moyer Jr. | | |
| 26 | Jul 17 | NAPA Know How 50 - Tri-City Speedway, Granite City, Illinois | Tyler Erb ($12,000) | Devin Moran | | 39 cars entered |
| 27 | Jul 18 | Show-Me 100 - Lucas Oil Speedway, Wheatland, Missouri | Payton Looney ($30,000) | Payton Looney | Earl Pearson Jr. | Payton Looney |
| 27 | Jul 18 | Show-Me 100 - Lucas Oil Speedway, Wheatland, Missouri | Payton Looney ($30,000) | Kyle Strickler | Josh Richards | Chris Simpson |
| 27 | Jul 18 | Show-Me 100 - Lucas Oil Speedway, Wheatland, Missouri | Payton Looney ($30,000) | Ricky Thornton Jr. | | |
| 27 | Jul 18 | Show-Me 100 - Lucas Oil Speedway, Wheatland, Missouri | Payton Looney ($30,000) | Shanon Buckingham | | 46 cars entered |
| 28 | Jul 19 | Diamond Nationals - Lucas Oil Speedway, Wheatland, Missouri | Chris Ferguson ($12,000) | Chris Ferguson | Kyle Bronson | Chris Ferguson |
| 28 | Jul 19 | Diamond Nationals - Lucas Oil Speedway, Wheatland, Missouri | Chris Ferguson ($12,000) | Billy Moyer | Tim McCreadie | Shanon Buckingham |
| 28 | Jul 19 | Diamond Nationals - Lucas Oil Speedway, Wheatland, Missouri | Chris Ferguson ($12,000) | Shanon Buckingham | | |
| 28 | Jul 19 | Diamond Nationals - Lucas Oil Speedway, Wheatland, Missouri | Chris Ferguson ($12,000) | Billy Moyer Jr. | | 44 cars entered |
| 29 | Jul 23 | Optima Batteries Dirt Track Bank Go-50 - I-80 Speedway, Greenwood, Nebraska | Jimmy Owens ($12,000) | Stormy Scott | Shanon Buckingham | Stormy Scott |
| 29 | Jul 23 | Optima Batteries Dirt Track Bank Go-50 - I-80 Speedway, Greenwood, Nebraska | Jimmy Owens ($12,000) | Ricky Thornton Jr. | Chase Junghans | Josh Richards |
| 29 | Jul 23 | Optima Batteries Dirt Track Bank Go-50 - I-80 Speedway, Greenwood, Nebraska | Jimmy Owens ($12,000) | Josh Richards | | |
| 29 | Jul 23 | Optima Batteries Dirt Track Bank Go-50 - I-80 Speedway, Greenwood, Nebraska | Jimmy Owens ($12,000) | Jonathan Davenport | | 46 cars entered |
| 30 | Jul 24-25 | Silver Dollar Nationals - I-80 Speedway, Greenwood, Nebraska | Brandon Sheppard ($53,000) | Scott Bloomquist | Chris Ferguson | |
| 30 | Jul 24-25 | Silver Dollar Nationals - I-80 Speedway, Greenwood, Nebraska | Brandon Sheppard ($53,000) | Chase Junghans | Kyle Strickler | |
| 30 | Jul 24-25 | Silver Dollar Nationals - I-80 Speedway, Greenwood, Nebraska | Brandon Sheppard ($53,000) | Mason Zeigler | | |
| 30 | Jul 24-25 | Silver Dollar Nationals - I-80 Speedway, Greenwood, Nebraska | Brandon Sheppard ($53,000) | Chris Simpson | | |
| 30 | Jul 24-25 | Silver Dollar Nationals - I-80 Speedway, Greenwood, Nebraska | Brandon Sheppard ($53,000) | Ricky Thornton Jr. | | |
| 30 | Jul 24-25 | Silver Dollar Nationals - I-80 Speedway, Greenwood, Nebraska | Brandon Sheppard ($53,000) | Ricky Weiss | | |
| 30 | Jul 24-25 | Silver Dollar Nationals - I-80 Speedway, Greenwood, Nebraska | Brandon Sheppard ($53,000) | Jimmy Owens | | |
| 30 | Jul 24-25 | Silver Dollar Nationals - I-80 Speedway, Greenwood, Nebraska | Brandon Sheppard ($53,000) | Josh Richards | | |
| 30 | Jul 24-25 | Silver Dollar Nationals - I-80 Speedway, Greenwood, Nebraska | Brandon Sheppard ($53,000) | Kyle Bronson | | |
| 30 | Jul 24-25 | Silver Dollar Nationals - I-80 Speedway, Greenwood, Nebraska | Brandon Sheppard ($53,000) | Tim McCreadie | | 45 cars entered |
| 31 | Aug 12 | Ralph Latham Memorial - Florence Speedway, Union, Kentucky | Jimmy Owens ($12,000) | Devin Moran | Tim McCreadie | Devin Moran |
| 31 | Aug 12 | Ralph Latham Memorial - Florence Speedway, Union, Kentucky | Jimmy Owens ($12,000) | Chris Ferguson | Jonathan Davenport | Jimmy Owens |
| 31 | Aug 12 | Ralph Latham Memorial - Florence Speedway, Union, Kentucky | Jimmy Owens ($12,000) | Hudson O'Neal | | |
| 31 | Aug 12 | Ralph Latham Memorial - Florence Speedway, Union, Kentucky | Jimmy Owens ($12,000) | Jimmy Owens | | |
| 31 | Aug 12 | Ralph Latham Memorial - Florence Speedway, Union, Kentucky | Jimmy Owens ($12,000) | Josh Richards | | |
| 31 | Aug 12 | Ralph Latham Memorial - Florence Speedway, Union, Kentucky | Jimmy Owens ($12,000) | Shanon Buckingham | | 53 cars entered |
| 32 | Aug 13 | North/South Shootout - Florence Speedway, Union, Kentucky | Mike Marlar ($10,000) | Kyle Bronson | Billy Moyer Jr. | Tyler Erb |
| 32 | Aug 13 | North/South Shootout - Florence Speedway, Union, Kentucky | Mike Marlar ($10,000) | Devin Moran | Dale McDowell | Jimmy Owens |
| 32 | Aug 13 | North/South Shootout - Florence Speedway, Union, Kentucky | Mike Marlar ($10,000) | Brandon Overton | | |
| 32 | Aug 13 | North/South Shootout - Florence Speedway, Union, Kentucky | Mike Marlar ($10,000) | Jimmy Owens | | |
| 32 | Aug 13 | North/South Shootout - Florence Speedway, Union, Kentucky | Mike Marlar ($10,000) | Josh Richards | | |
| 32 | Aug 13 | North/South Shootout - Florence Speedway, Union, Kentucky | Mike Marlar ($10,000) | Mike Marlar | | 52 cars entered |
| 33 | Aug 14-15 | North/South 100 - Florence Speedway, Union, Kentucky | Tim McCreadie ($50,000) | Shane Clanton | Josh Rice | |
| 33 | Aug 14-15 | North/South 100 - Florence Speedway, Union, Kentucky | Tim McCreadie ($50,000) | Chris Ferguson | Jason Jameson | |
| 33 | Aug 14-15 | North/South 100 - Florence Speedway, Union, Kentucky | Tim McCreadie ($50,000) | Tim McCreadie | | |
| 33 | Aug 14-15 | North/South 100 - Florence Speedway, Union, Kentucky | Tim McCreadie ($50,000) | Tyler Bruening | | |
| 33 | Aug 14-15 | North/South 100 - Florence Speedway, Union, Kentucky | Tim McCreadie ($50,000) | Earl Pearson Jr. | | |
| 33 | Aug 14-15 | North/South 100 - Florence Speedway, Union, Kentucky | Tim McCreadie ($50,000) | Shanon Buckingham | | |
| 33 | Aug 14-15 | North/South 100 - Florence Speedway, Union, Kentucky | Tim McCreadie ($50,000) | Jonathan Davenport | | |
| 33 | Aug 14-15 | North/South 100 - Florence Speedway, Union, Kentucky | Tim McCreadie ($50,000) | Hudson O'Neal | | |
| 33 | Aug 14-15 | North/South 100 - Florence Speedway, Union, Kentucky | Tim McCreadie ($50,000) | Brandon Overton | | |
| 33 | Aug 14-15 | North/South 100 - Florence Speedway, Union, Kentucky | Tim McCreadie ($50,000) | Josh Rice | | 53 cars entered |
| 34 | Aug 20 | Topless 100 Prelim - Batesville Motor Speedway, Locust Grove, Arkansas | Tim McCreadie ($5,000) | Jimmy Owens | Timothy Culp | Jimmy Owens |
| 34 | Aug 20 | Topless 100 Prelim - Batesville Motor Speedway, Locust Grove, Arkansas | Tim McCreadie ($5,000) | Billy Moyer Jr. | Neil Baggett | Dale McDowell |
| 34 | Aug 20 | Topless 100 Prelim - Batesville Motor Speedway, Locust Grove, Arkansas | Tim McCreadie ($5,000) | Tim McCreadie | | |
| 34 | Aug 20 | Topless 100 Prelim - Batesville Motor Speedway, Locust Grove, Arkansas | Tim McCreadie ($5,000) | Dale McDowell | | |
| 34 | Aug 20 | Topless 100 Prelim - Batesville Motor Speedway, Locust Grove, Arkansas | Tim McCreadie ($5,000) | Earl Pearson Jr. | | |
| 34 | Aug 20 | Topless 100 Prelim - Batesville Motor Speedway, Locust Grove, Arkansas | Tim McCreadie ($5,000) | Brandon Overton | | 48 cars entered |
| 35 | Aug 21 | Topless 100 Prelim - Batesville Motor Speedway, Locust Grove, Arkansas | Jimmy Owens ($5,000) | Jimmy Owens | Chris Madden | Jimmy Owens |
| 35 | Aug 21 | Topless 100 Prelim - Batesville Motor Speedway, Locust Grove, Arkansas | Jimmy Owens ($5,000) | Shanon Buckingham | Shannon Babb | Brandon Overton |
| 35 | Aug 21 | Topless 100 Prelim - Batesville Motor Speedway, Locust Grove, Arkansas | Jimmy Owens ($5,000) | Jonathan Davenport | | |
| 35 | Aug 21 | Topless 100 Prelim - Batesville Motor Speedway, Locust Grove, Arkansas | Jimmy Owens ($5,000) | Jimmy Owens | | |
| 35 | Aug 21 | Topless 100 Prelim - Batesville Motor Speedway, Locust Grove, Arkansas | Jimmy Owens ($5,000) | Kyle Bronson | | |
| 35 | Aug 21 | Topless 100 Prelim - Batesville Motor Speedway, Locust Grove, Arkansas | Jimmy Owens ($5,000) | Earl Pearson Jr. | | 47 cars entered |
| 36 | Aug 22 | Topless 100 - Batesville Motor Speedway, Locust Grove, Arkansas | Jimmy Owens ($40,000) | | Tyler Erb | |
| 36 | Aug 22 | Topless 100 - Batesville Motor Speedway, Locust Grove, Arkansas | Jimmy Owens ($40,000) | | Billy Moyer | 47 cars entered |
| 37 | Aug 27 | Rumble by the River - Port Royal Speedway, Port Royal, Pennsylvania | Tim McCreadie ($10,000) | Tim McCreadie | Tanner English | Tim McCreadie |
| 37 | Aug 27 | Rumble by the River - Port Royal Speedway, Port Royal, Pennsylvania | Tim McCreadie ($10,000) | Kyle Strickler | Rick Eckert | Jimmy Owens |
| 37 | Aug 27 | Rumble by the River - Port Royal Speedway, Port Royal, Pennsylvania | Tim McCreadie ($10,000) | Shane Clanton | | |
| 37 | Aug 27 | Rumble by the River - Port Royal Speedway, Port Royal, Pennsylvania | Tim McCreadie ($10,000) | Jimmy Owens | | |
| 37 | Aug 27 | Rumble by the River - Port Royal Speedway, Port Royal, Pennsylvania | Tim McCreadie ($10,000) | Devin Moran | | |
| 37 | Aug 27 | Rumble by the River - Port Royal Speedway, Port Royal, Pennsylvania | Tim McCreadie ($10,000) | Kyle Larson | | 55 cars entered |
| 38 | Aug 29 | Rumble by the River - Port Royal Speedway, Port Royal, Pennsylvania | Kyle Larson ($15,000) | Brandon Sheppard | Rick Eckert | Brandon Sheppard |
| 38 | Aug 29 | Rumble by the River - Port Royal Speedway, Port Royal, Pennsylvania | Kyle Larson ($15,000) | Hudson O'Neal | Trent Ivey | Kyle Larson |
| 38 | Aug 29 | Rumble by the River - Port Royal Speedway, Port Royal, Pennsylvania | Kyle Larson ($15,000) | Kyle Strickler | | |
| 38 | Aug 29 | Rumble by the River - Port Royal Speedway, Port Royal, Pennsylvania | Kyle Larson ($15,000) | Kyle Larson | | |
| 38 | Aug 29 | Rumble by the River - Port Royal Speedway, Port Royal, Pennsylvania | Kyle Larson ($15,000) | Kyle Bronson | | |
| 38 | Aug 29 | Rumble by the River - Port Royal Speedway, Port Royal, Pennsylvania | Kyle Larson ($15,000) | Gregg Satterlee | | 53 cars entered |
| 39 | Sep 4 | John Bradshaw Memorial - Ponderosa Speedway, Junction City, Kentucky | Jonathan Davenport ($12,000) | Jonathan Davenport | Michael Chilton | Jonathan Davenport |
| 39 | Sep 4 | John Bradshaw Memorial - Ponderosa Speedway, Junction City, Kentucky | Jonathan Davenport ($12,000) | Billy Moyer Jr. | | David Webb |
| 39 | Sep 4 | John Bradshaw Memorial - Ponderosa Speedway, Junction City, Kentucky | Jonathan Davenport ($12,000) | Jimmy Owens | | |
| 39 | Sep 4 | John Bradshaw Memorial - Ponderosa Speedway, Junction City, Kentucky | Jonathan Davenport ($12,000) | Kyle Strickler | | 30 cars entered |
| 40 | Sep 5 | Bob Miller Memorial River Rumble Days - Portsmouth Raceway Park, Portsmouth, Ohio | Hudson O'Neal ($12,000) | Jonathan Davenport | Kody Evans | Tim McCreadie |
| 40 | Sep 5 | Bob Miller Memorial River Rumble Days - Portsmouth Raceway Park, Portsmouth, Ohio | Hudson O'Neal ($12,000) | Stormy Scott | | Jimmy Owens |
| 40 | Sep 5 | Bob Miller Memorial River Rumble Days - Portsmouth Raceway Park, Portsmouth, Ohio | Hudson O'Neal ($12,000) | Jimmy Owens | | |
| 40 | Sep 5 | Bob Miller Memorial River Rumble Days - Portsmouth Raceway Park, Portsmouth, Ohio | Hudson O'Neal ($12,000) | Devin Moran | | 28 cars entered |
| 41 | Sep 17 | I-80 Nationals - I-80 Speedway, Greenwood, Nebraska | Kyle Strickler ($7,000) | Darrell Lanigan | Jonathan Davenport | Devin Moran |
| 41 | Sep 17 | I-80 Nationals - I-80 Speedway, Greenwood, Nebraska | Kyle Strickler ($7,000) | Tim McCreadie | Billy Moyer Jr. | Kyle Strickler |
| 41 | Sep 17 | I-80 Nationals - I-80 Speedway, Greenwood, Nebraska | Kyle Strickler ($7,000) | Josh Richards | | |
| 41 | Sep 17 | I-80 Nationals - I-80 Speedway, Greenwood, Nebraska | Kyle Strickler ($7,000) | Brandon Overton | | 46 cars entered |
| 42 | Sep 18 | I-80 Nationals - I-80 Speedway, Greenwood, Nebraska | Jimmy Owens ($7,000) | Brandon Overton | Jared Landers | Brandon Overton |
| 42 | Sep 18 | I-80 Nationals - I-80 Speedway, Greenwood, Nebraska | Jimmy Owens ($7,000) | Tyler Erb | Billy Moyer | Tim McCreadie |
| 42 | Sep 18 | I-80 Nationals - I-80 Speedway, Greenwood, Nebraska | Jimmy Owens ($7,000) | Josh Richards | | |
| 42 | Sep 18 | I-80 Nationals - I-80 Speedway, Greenwood, Nebraska | Jimmy Owens ($7,000) | Chris Simpson | | 43 cars entered |
| 43 | Sep 19 | I-80 Nationals - I-80 Speedway, Greenwood, Nebraska | Tim McCreadie ($30,000) | | Hudson O'Neal | |
| 43 | Sep 19 | I-80 Nationals - I-80 Speedway, Greenwood, Nebraska | Tim McCreadie ($30,000) | | Jared Landers | 43 cars entered |
| 44 | Sep 25 | Night Before the Jackson - Brownstown Speedway, Brownstown, Indiana | Josh Richards ($10,000) | Devin Moran | Stormy Scott | Chris Ferguson |
| 44 | Sep 25 | Night Before the Jackson - Brownstown Speedway, Brownstown, Indiana | Josh Richards ($10,000) | Hudson O'Neal | Steve Casebolt | Billy Moyer |
| 44 | Sep 25 | Night Before the Jackson - Brownstown Speedway, Brownstown, Indiana | Josh Richards ($10,000) | Ricky Thornton Jr. | Tanner English | |
| 44 | Sep 25 | Night Before the Jackson - Brownstown Speedway, Brownstown, Indiana | Josh Richards ($10,000) | Billy Moyer | | |
| 44 | Sep 25 | Night Before the Jackson - Brownstown Speedway, Brownstown, Indiana | Josh Richards ($10,000) | Tim McCreadie | | |
| 44 | Sep 25 | Night Before the Jackson - Brownstown Speedway, Brownstown, Indiana | Josh Richards ($10,000) | Earl Pearson Jr. | | 59 cars entered |
| 45 | Sep 26 | Jackson 100 - Brownstown Speedway, Brownstown, Indiana | Tim McCreadie ($15,000) | Kyle Strickler | Justin Rattliff | Kyle Strickler |
| 45 | Sep 26 | Jackson 100 - Brownstown Speedway, Brownstown, Indiana | Tim McCreadie ($15,000) | Ricky Thornton Jr. | Chad Finley | Michael Chilton |
| 45 | Sep 26 | Jackson 100 - Brownstown Speedway, Brownstown, Indiana | Tim McCreadie ($15,000) | Billy Moyer | Steve Casebolt | |
| 45 | Sep 26 | Jackson 100 - Brownstown Speedway, Brownstown, Indiana | Tim McCreadie ($15,000) | Jonathan Davenport | | |
| 45 | Sep 26 | Jackson 100 - Brownstown Speedway, Brownstown, Indiana | Tim McCreadie ($15,000) | Tim McCreadie | | |
| 45 | Sep 26 | Jackson 100 - Brownstown Speedway, Brownstown, Indiana | Tim McCreadie ($15,000) | Zack Dohm | | 60 cars entered |
| 46 | Oct 3 | Pittsburgher 100 - Pittsburgh's PA Motor Speedway, Imperial, Pennsylvania | Ricky Thornton Jr. ($20,000) | Devin Moran | Jared Miley | Michael Norris |
| 46 | Oct 3 | Pittsburgher 100 - Pittsburgh's PA Motor Speedway, Imperial, Pennsylvania | Ricky Thornton Jr. ($20,000) | Shane Clanton | Jonathan Davenport | Josh Richards |
| 46 | Oct 3 | Pittsburgher 100 - Pittsburgh's PA Motor Speedway, Imperial, Pennsylvania | Ricky Thornton Jr. ($20,000) | Josh Richards | | |
| 46 | Oct 3 | Pittsburgher 100 - Pittsburgh's PA Motor Speedway, Imperial, Pennsylvania | Ricky Thornton Jr. ($20,000) | Kyle Strickler | | 35 cars entered |
| 47 | Oct 16-17 | Dirt Track World Championship - Portsmouth Raceway Park, Portsmouth, Ohio | Brandon Sheppard ($100,000) | Tim McCreadie | Jimmy Owens | Tim McCreadie |
| 47 | Oct 16-17 | Dirt Track World Championship - Portsmouth Raceway Park, Portsmouth, Ohio | Brandon Sheppard ($100,000) | Chris Ferguson | Earl Pearson Jr. | Shane Clanton |
| 47 | Oct 16-17 | Dirt Track World Championship - Portsmouth Raceway Park, Portsmouth, Ohio | Brandon Sheppard ($100,000) | Scott Bloomquist | Kyle Bronson | |
| 47 | Oct 16-17 | Dirt Track World Championship - Portsmouth Raceway Park, Portsmouth, Ohio | Brandon Sheppard ($100,000) | Brandon Overton | | |
| 47 | Oct 16-17 | Dirt Track World Championship - Portsmouth Raceway Park, Portsmouth, Ohio | Brandon Sheppard ($100,000) | Ricky Thornton Jr. | | |
| 47 | Oct 16-17 | Dirt Track World Championship - Portsmouth Raceway Park, Portsmouth, Ohio | Brandon Sheppard ($100,000) | Mike Marlar | | 63 cars entered |

=== Schedule notes and changes ===
- On March 16, the LOLMDS suspended racing for 30 days in response to the COVID-19 pandemic. As a result, the Buckeye Spring 50 at Atomic Speedway in Chillicothe, Ohio was rescheduled to May 8; the Indiana Icebreaker at Brownstown Speedway in Brownstown, Indiana was rescheduled for May 9; the Tennessee's Action Track 50 at 411 Motor Speedway in Seymour, Tennessee was reschedule for June 26; and the E-Z GO 50 at Talladega Short Track in Eastaboga, Alabama was rescheduled for June 27.
- On April 3, the LOLMDS announced additional schedule changes in response to the COVID-19 pandemic. The Nininger Tribute scheduled for April 17 at Hagerstown Speedway in Hagerstown, Maryland, the Budweiser 50 scheduled for April 24 at Tri-City Speedway in Granite City, Illinois and an April 25 race at Macon Speedway in Illinois were all canceled. Also, the Rumble by the River scheduled for April 19 at Port Royal Speedway in Port Royal, Pennsylvania was postponed to August 27.
- On April 15, the LOLMDS announced that the John Bradshaw Memorial scheduled for May 1 at Ponderosa Speedway in Junction City, Kentucky was postponed to September 4. Also, the Ralph Latham Memorial scheduled for May 2 at Florence Speedway in Union, Kentucky was rescheduled to August 12.
- On May 1, the LOLMDS announced a slate of cancelations, as well as a fanless "Reopening Tour" for the month of May.
- On May 10, the LOLMDS canceled its scheduled Reopening Tour dates for May 11–13 at Lucas Oil Speedway in Wheatland, Missouri due to unfavorable weather forecasts. The tour added dates at Golden Isles Speedway and East Bay Raceway Park.
- On July 1, the LOLMDS canceled events scheduled in Minnesota for July 9 at the Deer Creek Speedway and July 10–11 at the Jackson Motorplex due to COVID-19 restrictions. The series also announced replacement race dates for July 10–11 at Florence Speedway in Union, Kentucky.
- On August 26, the LOLMDS announced the cancelation of the Lucas Oil Late Model Knoxville Nationals at Knoxville Raceway in Knoxville, Iowa and the Kokomo Late Model Shootout at the Kokomo Speedway in Kokomo, Indiana due to COVID-19 restrictions. The LOLMDS announced replacement events at I-80 Speedway in Greenwood, Nebraska on September 17–18 and at Brownstown Speedway in Brownstown, Indiana on September 25.
- On September 30, the LOLMDS announced that the Great Lakes 50 scheduled to run at Raceway 7 was canceled due to a rainy forecast.
- On October 7, the LOLMDS announced that races schedule at Dixie Speedway and Rome Speedway in Georgia were canceled due to Hurricane Delta.
