= Muskingum =

The word Muskingum (/məˈskɪŋ(ɡ)əm/ mə-SKING-(g)əm) derives from a similarly sounding Delaware (Native American) word, which some claim to translate as 'Eye of the Elk', but most likely means 'Swampy Ground'.
Muskingum may refer to:

- Muskingum (village), an 18th-century Native American community
- Muskingum University
- Muskingum County, Ohio
- Muskingum County Speedway
- Muskingum River
- Muskingum Island, an island in the Ohio River
- Muskingum Township, Ohio (disambiguation) (two different townships)
- Muskingum Electric Railroad
