= Alexandria, Scioto County, Ohio =

Unincorporated community in Ohio, U.S.

Coordinates: 38°43′28″N 83°02′53″W

Alexandria is an unincorporated community in Scioto County, in the U.S. state of Ohio.

Careys Run flows through the community.

== History ==
Alexandria was platted in 1799 and was either named after Alexandria, Virginia, or after Alexander Parker, the brother of a first settler. A post office was established at Alexandria in 1805, and later was discontinued at an unknown date (1808, according to one source).
