= Sharon, Ohio =

Unincorporated community in Ohio, United States

Coordinates: 39°44′10″N 81°33′54″W

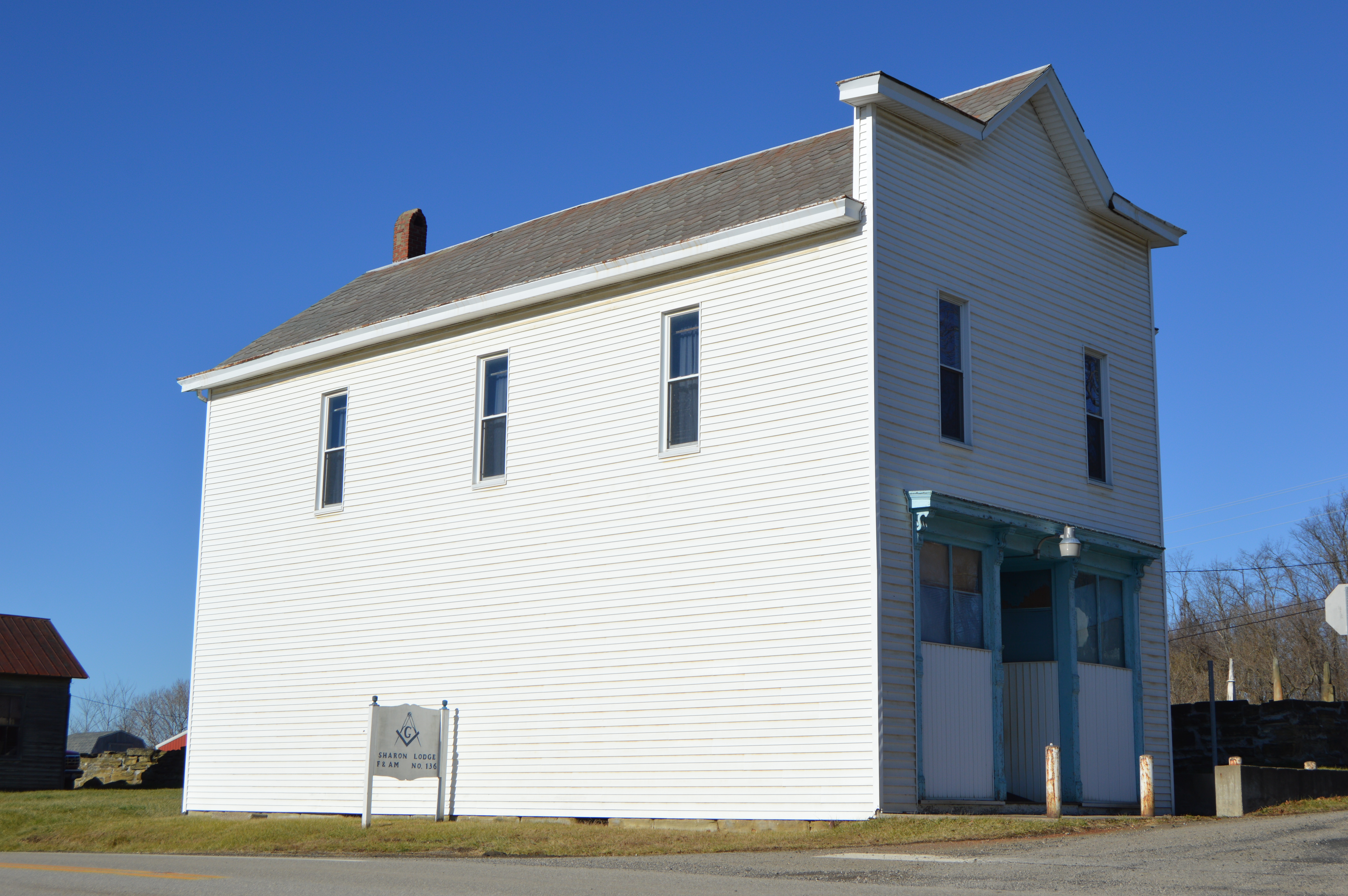
Masonic lodge building

Sharon is an unincorporated community in Noble County, in the U.S. state of Ohio.

== History ==
Sharon was laid out in 1834. The community takes its name from Sharon Township. A post office was established at Sharon in 1831, and remained in operation until 1984.
