= Muskingum Township, Ohio =

Muskingum Township, Ohio may refer to:

- Muskingum Township, Muskingum County, Ohio
- Muskingum Township, Washington County, Ohio
