= Lucas Oil Late Model Dirt Series =

American dirt late model touring series

- Lucas Oil Late Model Dirt Series logo (2006)
- Country: United States
- Inaugural season: 2005
- Constructors: Barry Wright Race Cars · Black Diamond Chassis · BMF • Bob Pierce Race Cars · Capital Race Cars · CJ Rayburn · Club 29 Race Cars · CVR Race Cars · GRT · Kryptonite • Longhorn Chassis · MasterSbilt · MB Customs · Rocket Chassis · Snow Brothers Chassis · Sweet-Bloomquist Race Cars · Warrior
- Tire suppliers: Hoosier Racing Tire
- Drivers' champion: Brandon Sheppard
- Official website: Lucas Oil Late Model Dirt Series

Lucas Oil Late Model Dirt Series (LOLMDS) is a dirt late model touring series owned and operated by FloSports and sponsored by Lucas Oil. The series competes on dirt ovals across the United States, primarily throughout the east coast and the Midwest.

== Overview ==
The North American Racing Association (NARA) debuted on the stock car scene in 2004. Founded by Spencer Wilson NARA was designed with the premise of enforcing fair, consistent, and equal rules among competitors. In 2005, Wilson sold NARA to one of its major corporate sponsors, Lucas Oil, and became the Series Director of the renamed tour for the next few seasons.

At the end of the 2025 racing season FloSports acquired the LOLMDS from Lucas Oil Products, with Lucas agreeing to a multi-year exclusive title sponsorship agreement.

The cars feature a purpose-built chassis design specifically for dirt late model racing. With many chassis builders within the sport, chassis design and components are always on the cutting edge of innovation and technology. The cars are powered by aluminum-head V8 engines (usually ranging between 400c.i. and 430c.i.) that produce over 800 horsepower.

Among the marquee races on the Lucas Oil Late Model Dirt Series schedule include Winternationals hosted by Golden Isle Speedway in Waynesville Georgia, along with All-Tech (Lake City) and Ocala Speedways in Florida; Show-Me 100 at Lucas Oil Speedway in Wheatland, Missouri; Silver Dollar Nationals at Shelby County Speedway in Iowa; Topless 100 at Batesville Motor Speedway in Arkansas; Knoxville Late Model Nationals at Knoxville Raceway in Iowa; the Pittsburgher 100 at the Pennsylvania Motor Speedway; and the Dirt Track World Championship at West Virginia Motor Speedway in Mineral Wells.

== Television ==
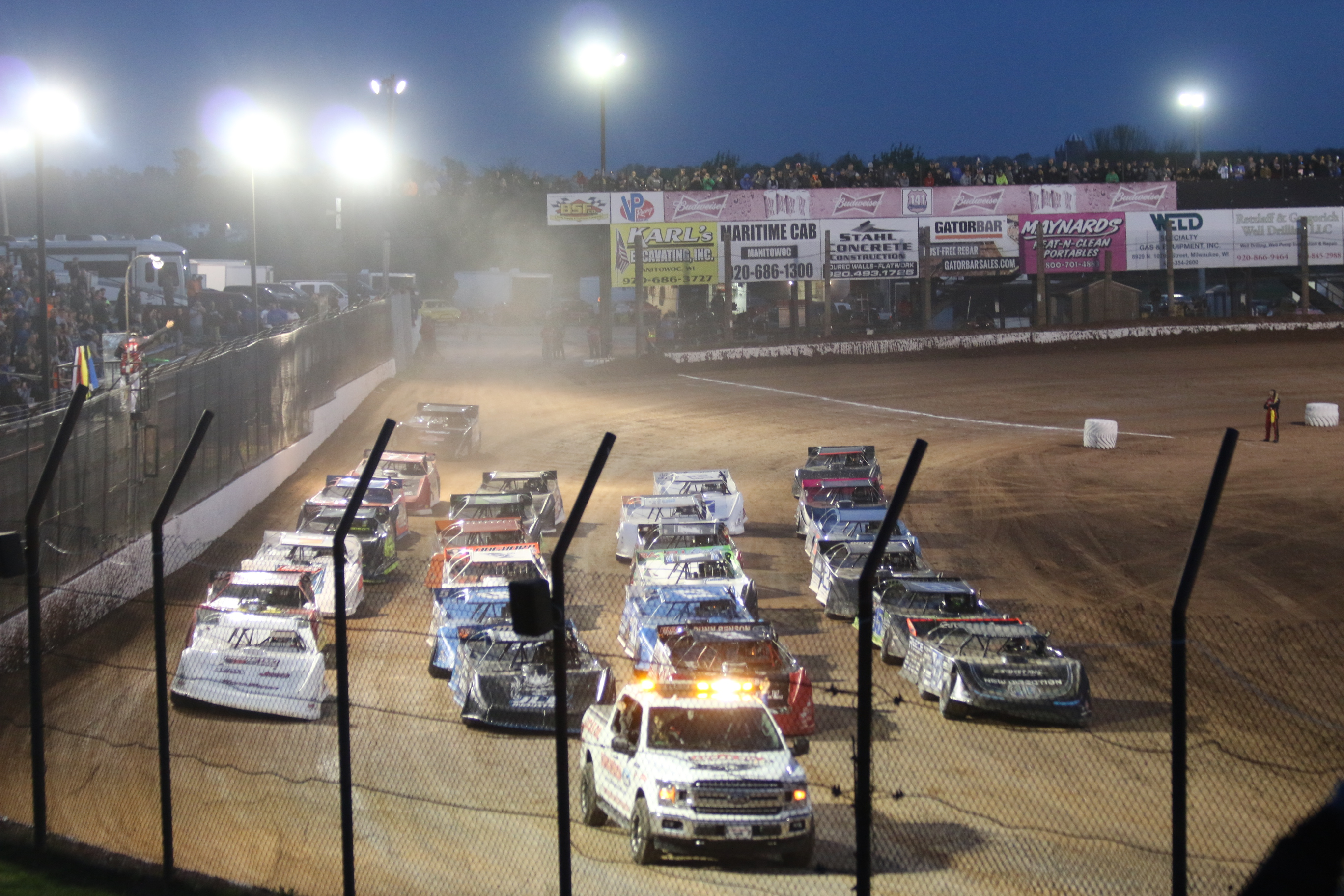
Drivers give a 4 wide salute to fans at 141 Speedway in 2018

Originally broadcast on ESPN2, the series is currently broadcast on FloSports.

== Past champions ==
- 2026 – Brandon Sheppard, Berlin, Illinois
- 2025 – Devin Moran, Dresden, Ohio
- 2024 – Ricky Thornton Jr., Martinsville, Indiana
- 2023 – Hudson O'Neal, Martinsville, Indiana
- 2022 – Tim McCreadie, Watertown, NY
- 2021 – Tim McCreadie, Watertown, NY
- 2020 – Jimmy Owens, Newport, TN
- 2019 – Jonathan Davenport, Blairsville, GA
- 2018 – Jonathan Davenport, Blairsville, GA
- 2017 – Josh Richards, Shinnston, WV
- 2016 – Scott Bloomquist, Mooresburg, TN
- 2015 – Jonathan Davenport, Blairsville, GA
- 2014 – Don O'Neal, Martinsville, IN
- 2013 – Jimmy Owens, Newport, TN
- 2012 – Jimmy Owens, Newport, TN
- 2011 – Jimmy Owens, Newport, TN
- 2010 – Scott Bloomquist, Mooresburg, TN
- 2009 – Scott Bloomquist, Mooresburg, TN
- 2008 – Earl Pearson Jr., Jacksonville, FL
- 2007 – Earl Pearson Jr., Jacksonville, FL
- 2006 – Earl Pearson Jr., Jacksonville, FL
- 2005 – Earl Pearson Jr., Jacksonville, FL
- 2004 – Shannon Babb, Moweaqua, IL (as the NARA DirtCar Series)
