= LaSalle Speedway =

Coordinates: 41.3345°N 89.0752°W

The LaSalle Speedway (formerly known as the Tri-City Speedway) is a 1/4 mile dirt track racing speedway founded in 1947 and located in LaSalle, Illinois. The speedway closed in 2019 in the middle of the racing season. The track has reopened for sporadic events in 2021.

LaSalle Speedway has reopened for the full 2025 racing season! LaSalle Speedway Schedule

== History ==
In 1947, the LaSalle Speedway was founded as the Tri-City Speedway. It closed after only six races due to low interest. For two years, a cow milking center operated in the spot. Starting in 1951, a Drive-in theater operated at the site. The final showing was Herbie Rides Again on November 13, 1973.

In December 1991, word spread of another dirt track speedway at exactly the same site as the original. It was to be called the LaSalle Speedway and built by Izzo Construction, Inc., a local construction owned by Tony Izzo, the man who bought the land. LaSalle Speedway opened in summer 1992. Seating was expanded years later.

In May 2019, it was announced via LaSalle Speedway's social media that the track had ceased operations. Being that it was in the middle of the racing season, all the scheduled events were cancelled. In October 2019, the speedway, including four homes on the property, went up for sale with an asking price of $2 million.

The LaSalle Speedway now focuses as running special events such as the Thaw Brawl to kick off the year, Lucas Oil Dirt Late Model event in the spring, hosts the UMP SummerNationals in July, IMCA One Night Stand in August, and also hosts the Bill Waite Jr. Memorial IRA Sprint Car special late in the fall.

== Event History ==
The LaSalle Speedway has hosted great touring organizations including the World of Outlaw Sprint Car Series, AMA, ARCA Truck Series, and several Dirt Late Model events such as UMP, Lucas Oil Late Model Dirt Series, and the World of Outlaws Late Model Series. The past 2 years the LaSalle Speedway has also been host to the IMCA One Night Stand where IMCA sanctioned drivers can try their hand at the famed LaSalle Speedway.

2011 UMP SummerNationals Winner: Shannon Babb

2012 Thaw Brawl Winner: Dennis Erb Jr.

2012 UMP SummerNationals Winner: Brian Birkhofer

2012 Fall Brawl w/ ALMS Series Winner: Dennis Erb Jr.

2013 Thaw Brawl Night 1 Winner: Dennis Erb Jr.

2013 Thaw Brawl Night 2 Winner: Brian Birkhofer

2013 UMP SummerNationals Winner: Bobby Pierce

2014 Thaw Brawl Winner: Dennis Erb Jr.

2014 Lucas Oil Spring Shootout Winner: Jimmy Owens

2015 Thaw Brawl Night 1: Bobby Pierce

2015 Thaw Brawl Night 2: Bobby Pierce

2015 IRA Sprint Cars: Bill Balog

2015 UMP SummerNationals: Chris Simpson

2016 Thaw Brawl Night 1: Brian Shirley

2016 Thaw Brawl Night 2: Brian Shirley

2016 IRA Sprint Cars: Parker Price-Miller

2016 Spring Shootout: Brandon Sheppard

2016 UMP SummerNationals: Bobby Pierce

2016 Bill Waite Jr. Memorial (IRA Sprint Cars): Bill Balog

2020 UMP SummerNationals: Brian Shirley

2020 Mars Championship Night: Brandon Sheppard

2021 Thaw Brawl Night 1: Ryan Unzicker

== Celebrity appearances ==
Toby Keith, Sawyer Brown, and Trick Pony have each made the speedway a temporary music venue. NASCAR star Kasey Kahne raced a 20 lap race against amateur racers in 2010.
