= Portsmouth Raceway Park =

American dirt track for motorsports

Where Southern Hospitality Begins
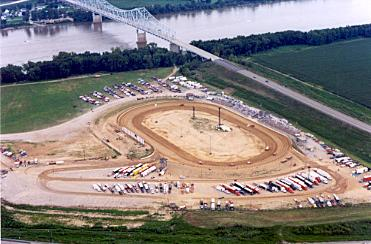
- Photo (taken from the air) of Portsmouth Raceway
- Location: Washington Township, Scioto County, near Portsmouth, Ohio
- Coordinates: 38°44′00″N 83°01′04″W
- Capacity: 8,500 approx.
- Owner: Boone Coleman
- Operator: Boone Coleman/Tim Coleman
- Opened: 1990
- Website: http://www.portsraceway.com

Oval
- Surface: Dirt
- Length: 0.375 mi (0.604 km)
- Turns: 4
- Banking: Turns: 18° Straights: 8°
- Race lap record: 0:13.840 (Scott Bloomquist, Sept 1st, 2018, Late Model)

Portsmouth Raceway Park (PRP) is a three-eighths mile dirt track located approximately 1 mile west of Portsmouth, Ohio. The track was built in 1990 by owner/operator Boone Coleman. The track hosts weekly racing events throughout the summer months, including the classes, Late Model, Modified, Limited Late Model, and Bomber. In 2009 the track hosted its first televised event, The "Big Red Book" River Days Rumble, featuring the Lucas Oil Late Model Series. The series made two appearances at the track in 2010, featuring one televised event, the two day "Pepsi 75 – River Days Rumble" paying $20,000 to the winner. In 2012 the speedway hosted the 'crown jewel' racing event, The Dirt Track World Championship. The race, the thirty-second annual running of the event, paid $50,000 to the winner and was televised on the SPEED Network and sanctioned by the Lucas Oil Late Model Series. The announcement was made during the D.T.W.C. weekend that the thirty-third annual hosting of the event would also take place at the speedway under Lucas Oil series sanction. The DTWC now pays $100,000 to win, Brandon Sheppard of New Berlin, IL is the defending champion (2019).

== Track history ==
The track is built on a site that once housed a Shawnee Indian campground, but the Shawnee were run off the land by white settlers. On June 3, 1799, the town of Alexandria was founded on the site. The town would eventually move to what is currently known as Portsmouth, Ohio in 1813 because of multiple floods. As time went on the site was converted into farmland. Current owner Boone Coleman purchased the land in the 1970s.

In the summer of 1990 Coleman began excavation on the site; when asked about his intentions he replied: "My son Tim has a racecar and no place to practice!" Boone later decided to try to recover some of the money he spent building the track, and installed grandstands. The first season kicked off in late 1990 — only two races were held that year. The first full season of racing was held at PRP in 1991. In 1992 the grandstands and concession areas at the track were destroyed when vandals took one of the tracks dozers on a rampage. The track crew was able to rebuild the track and was ready to race again within two weeks.

In 2000 the track was converted from a one-third mile to three-eighths mile.

== Track records ==
The current track record at Portsmouth Raceway Park in the Late Model class is held by Lucas Oil Late Model Dirt Series driver, Scott Bloomquist at a 13.840

The track record at the old one-third mile track was set by local businessman and driver RJ Conley in his popular #71C at 13.595.

== Former Track Champions ==
- 1991
  - Mini Sprint – Tracy Hoover
  - Modified – Richard Callihan
  - Street Stock – Bob Dean
  - Bombers – Duane Pick
- 1992
  - Mini Sprint – Tracy Hoover
  - Modified – Richard Callihan
  - Street Stock – Bob Dean
  - Bombers – Larry Harr
- 1993
  - Late Model – Delmas Conley
  - Modified – Marty Horton
  - Street Stock – Rick Walker
  - Bombers – Don Coriell
- 1994
  - Late Model – Rick Walker
  - Modified – Richard Callihan
  - Street Stock – Marty Horton
  - Bombers – Tony DeHart
- 1995
  - Late Model – Charlie Seymour
  - Modified – Marty Horton
  - Street Stock – Phillip Harding
  - Bombers – Tony DeHart
- 1996
  - Late Model – Bob Adams Jr.
  - Modified – Jeff Cunningham
  - Street Stock – Chris Blair
  - Bombers – Tony DeHart
- 1997
  - Late Model – Bob Adams Jr.
  - Modified – Tim Tribby
  - Street Stock – Kenny McCann
  - Bombers – Bubby McCarty
- 1998
  - Late Model – Bill Bocook
  - Modified – Tim Tribby
  - Street Stock – John Melvin
  - Bombers – Danny Hamilton
- 1999
  - Late Model – Craig Leist
  - Modified – Tony DeHart
  - Street Stock – John Melvin
  - Bombers – Bo Cox
- 2000
  - Late Model – Kenny Christy
  - Modified – Eddie Harmon
  - Street Stock – Tim Robinson
  - Bombers – Phillip Kouns
- 2001
  - Late Model – Aaron Bapst
  - Modified – Bo Cox
  - Limited Late Model – Mike Steele
  - Bombers – Donald Sensabaugh
- 2002
  - Late Model – Kenny Christy
  - Modified – Eddie Harmon
  - Limited Late Model – John Melvin
  - Bombers – Josh McGuire
- 2003
  - Late Model – R.J. Conley
  - Modified – Eddie Harmon
  - Limited Late Model – John Melvin
  - Bombers – Josh McGuire
- 2004
  - Late Model – R.J. Conley
  - Modified – Eddie Harmon
  - Limited Late Model – Jeff Stevens
  - Bombers – Jeremie Bretz
- 2005
  - Late Model – Aaron Bapst
  - Modified – Adam Jordan
  - Limited Late Model – Jeff Stevens
  - Bombers – Jeremie Bretz
- 2006
  - Late Model – Jackie Boggs
  - Modified – Doug Adkins
  - Limited Late Model – John Melvin
  - Bombers – Shane Pendleton
- 2007
  - Late Model – Audie Swartz
  - Modified – Rick Walker
  - Limited Late Model – John Melvin
  - Bombers – Shane Pendleton
- 2008
  - Late Model – Jackie Boggs
  - Modified – Doug Adkins
  - Limited Late Model – John Melvin
  - Bombers – Shane Pendleton
- 2009
  - Late Model – Kenny Christy
  - Modified – Doug Adkins
  - Limited Late Model – John Melvin
  - Bomber – Jeremie Bretz
- 2010
  - Late Model – RJ Conley
  - Modified – David McWilliams
  - Limited Late Model – Evyian Terry
  - Bomber – Jeremie Bretz
- 2011
  - Late Model – Chris Wilson
  - Modified – Doug Adkins
  - Limited Late Model – John Melvin
  - Bomber – Robbie Lewis
