= Careys Run =

Stream in Ohio, U.S.

Coordinates: 38°42′58″N 83°02′24″W

Careys Run is a stream in the U.S. state of Ohio.

Careys Run was named after Stephen Carey, a local pioneer.

== See also ==
- List of rivers of Ohio
