= Tyler County Speedway =

Motorsport venue in Middlebourne, West Virginia

Coordinates: 39.472138°N 80.86195°W

"The Bullring"
- Location: Middlebourne, West Virginia
- Owner: Tyler County Fairboard
- Operator: Scott Jenkins
- Opened: 1974

Oval
- Surface: Clay
- Length: 0.25 mi (0.40 km)
- Turns: 4
- Banking: High banking
- Race lap record: (Jacob Hawkins)

Tyler County Speedway also known as America's Baddest Bullring is a 1/4 mile dirt oval located in Tyler County, southeast of Middlebourne, West Virginia. Located at the Tyler County Fair Grounds, it hosts many large races such as the Country Roads 100 (Replacing the Hillbilly 100 in 2025), Earl Hill Memorial, Topless 50, Eaton/Childers 'King of the Ring', Pat Herrick Memorial among others. Classes currently raced at Tyler County Speedway are Super Late Models, RUSH Late Models, UMP Modifieds, EDGE Hot Mods, Sportmods, SCDRA 4 Cylinders and Mini Wedges.

Many national and regional touring series call on Tyler County Speedway throughout the racing season including the Modified Mafia touring series, the Tri-State Street Stocks, and the Rush late models.
