= Locust Grove, Arkansas =

- Unincorporated community
- Location within Arkansas Location within the United States
- Coordinates: 35°43′15″N 91°44′19″W
- Country: United States
- State: Arkansas
- County: Independence
- Elevation: 308 ft (94 m)
- Time zone: UTC-6 (Central (CST))
  - Summer (DST): UTC-5 (CDT)
- ZIP code: 72550
- Area code: 870
- GNIS feature ID: 51373

Locust Grove is an unincorporated community in Independence County, Arkansas, United States. Locust Grove is located at the junction of Arkansas highways 14, 25 and 230, 6.5 miles (10.5 km) west-southwest of Batesville. Locust Grove has a post office with ZIP code 72550.
