= Muskingum County Speedway =

Coordinates: 40°04′10″N 82°03′49″W

Muskingum County Speedway logo

Muskingum County Speedway, located in Zanesville, Ohio, United States is a 0.375-mile (0.604 km) dirt oval racetrack. Since 2005 has annually held the Lucas Oil Late Model Dirt Series Creno's 50 race on July 3.

== Major events ==
=== Lucas Oil Late Model Dirt Series ===
Date	Event name	Winner
July 3, 2005	Creno's 50	Don O'Neal
July 3, 2006	Creno's 50	Steve Shaver
July 3, 2007	Creno's 50	Steve Casebolt

== History ==
Louie Morosco built the Zanesville Speedway about 1940. The track was closed for a few years during World War II. Over the years, the track and surrounding area have seen several changes. Early the track was a short dirt track. At one point it became an asphalt speedway. Between the 1970 and 1971 seasons it was lengthened to 1/2 mile and clay returned as the racing surface. Grandstands were added through these years from different materials. There was the turn 4 hill that fans could use their own lawn chairs. Cement block as well as steel bleachers along both straights. In 1980, Morosco, was getting on in years and sold the property to Ronald F. Moran.

After three years of work, along with delays caused by the Army Corps of Engineers, the track was torn up and the asphalt removed from under the clay. The tire barrier that almost completely surround the track was removed. All the old bleachers and concession stands were demolished. A new concrete wall was installed along the front straight as well as a concession stand and office building. New grandstands were constructed with a press box positioned above. The old Zanesville Speedway was re-opened in May 1983 as The Muskingum County Speedway. Due to a heavy work load, Moran tried three times to let other people run the speedway, but it never seemed to work out. The track set idle for a couple years. In 1992, the track was shortened to 3/8 of a mile and was re-opened with Moran running the speedway himself. A new pit grandstand was installed in turn one to let people view the pit crews in action. A handicap viewing area was placed between the main stands and the car staging lanes.
