= Lucas Oil Speedway =

Racetrack in Missouri, U.S.

- Lucas Oil Wheatland Complex
- Interactive map of Lucas Oil Speedway
- Former names: Wheatland Raceway
- Coordinates: 37°56′25″N 93°23′52″W
- Owner: Lucas Oil
- Operator: Lucas Oil
- Surface: dirt; water

Construction
- Built: 2001
- Renovated: 2007
- Expanded: 2011; 2016

Website
- lucasoilspeedway.com

Lucas Oil Speedway is a motorsports racing facility located at the intersection of U.S. Route 54 and Missouri Route 83, in Wheatland, Missouri. Its primary circuit is a dirt track banked oval motorsport race track. Co-located at the site of the speedway is Lucas Lake, a motorboat racing venue, the first purpose-built boat drag racing lake in the world, located across from the track.

== History ==
Lucas Oil Speedway was originally built as the Wheatland Raceway, in 2001, as a 3/8-mile dirt track in a former agricultural field, by Ron and Mary Jenkins of Wheatland. It was purchased by Lucas Oil in 2004, and then was rebuilt. In 2006, after the conversion renovation, the track reopened as the Lucas Oil Speedway, with new visitor, VIP, and competitor, and track facilities.

An artificial lake, Lucas Lake was added to host drag boats and motorboat circuit racing. The boating facility was completed in 2011. With its opening, it became the world's first artificial lake for drag boat racing.

An offroad supercross-motocross-style track was added to host off-road dirt buggy racing. The construction was started in 2016 and completed by 2017, with inaugural events in 2017. Racing on the track includes offroad trucks, offroad buggies, motocross bikes. As of 2017, it is the only one of its type in southwest Missouri.

== Speedway Dirt Oval ==
Wheatland Raceway or Lucas Oil Speedway (aka The Diamond of Dirt Tracks) is a 3/8 mi (0.60 km) semi-banked oval with a clay surface. The oval is 400 ft (120 m) wide, 4,000 ft (1,200 m) long, and 12 ft (3.7 m) of banking. The interior of the oval is capable of holding 90,000,000 US gal (340,000,000 L) if it were watertight.

== Offroad dirt track ==
The off-road course at the Lucas Oil Wheatland Complex is 1.3 mi (2.1 km) long with seven left-hand turns and 2 right-hand turns, with large jumps. The Lucas Oil Off Road Racing Series held races on the circuit from 2015 until the series folded after the 2020 season (and it was on the tentative 2021 schedule. The May 21, 2019 event was cancelled after severe weather caused some damage to the facility.

== Racing boat facility ==
Lake Lucas, is an artificial lake that was purpose-built to be a drag boat course for drag racing boats. It is the world's first artificial lake built for drag boat racing. The lake is 4,000 feet (1,200 m) long, 400 feet (120 m) wide, and 8 feet (2.4 m) deep.
