= Lernerville Speedway =

Automobile race track in Sarver, Pennsylvania, U.S.

Coordinates: 40.738697°N 79.759873°W

- Lernerville Speedway Logo

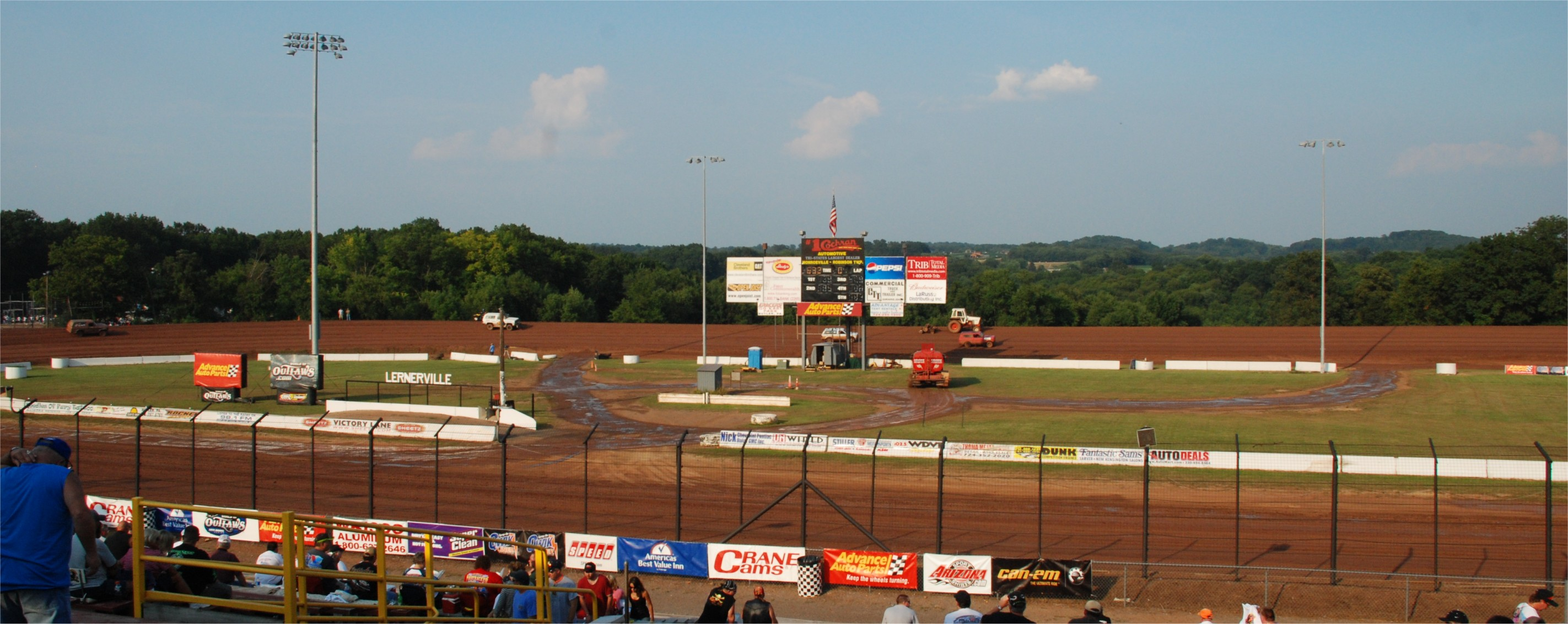
- Lernerville Speedway 2008
- Location: Sarver, Pennsylvania
- Owner: Ted Tomson
- Broke ground: 1967
- Opened: 1968
- Website: http://www.lernerville.com

Oval
- Surface: Dirt
- Length: .64 km (0.40 mi)

Lernerville Speedway is a 4/10 mile dirt oval automobile race track located in Sarver, Pennsylvania, United States. It is currently owned by Ted Tomson who runs Tomson Scrap Metal. Lernerville currently hosts the Lucas Oil Late Model Dirt Series and the USAC Racing sprint car series. 2027 will mark the 60th season for the track. The track features the "Fab 4" divisions weekly on Fridays from mid April through August. These divisions include the "Big Three"- 410 Sprints, Super Late Models, and Big Block Modifieds, and is the only track in the country to run all three on a weekly basis.

== Track Records ==
=== Total Wins ===
1. Bob Wearing Sr. 179
2. Lou Blaney 118
3. Ed Lynch Jr. 112
4. Lynn Geisler 109
5. Brian Swartzlander 102
6. Lou Gentile 89
7. Blackie Watt 84
8. Ralph Quarterson 61
9. Johnny Beaber 55
10. Kevin Bolland 55
11. AJ Flick 53
12. John Flinner 53
13. Michael Norris 53
14. Corey McPherson 53
15. Joe Kelley 52
16. Ed Lynch Sr. 47
17. Rod George 45
18. Alex Ferree 45
19. Bob Wearing Jr. 40
20. Chris Schneider 40

(Current Drivers in Italics)

== Don Martin Memorial Silver Cup ==
The headline race at Lernerville Speedway is the Don Martin Memorial Silver Cup. The Don Martin Memorial Silver Cup is the most prestigious sprint race at Lernerville each year, with the High Limit Racing Series sanctioning the event. The World Of Outlaws sanctioned the event prior to the 2022 season. The first Silver Cup in 1992 paid $25,000 to the winner, Sammy Swindell. Following the death of track promoter Don Martin, the Silver Cup was named in memory of Martin. In 2009, the race was split into two separate features, each paying $15,000 to win, with the highest average finisher in the two features being crowned the Silver Cup Champion. This was the only World of Outlaws sanctioned sprint car race to have two "A" Features each on a single date. To set up the second feature, all cars that remained on the lead lap were inverted to set up the second feature. Starting in 2011, the format changed again with the overall winner of the Silver Cup required to win one of the two features. This was put into place after the 2010 race, when Donny Schatz won the overall Silver Cup title without winning one of the features. In 2011, NASCAR drivers Kasey Kahne and 2011 NASCAR champion Tony Stewart competed in this race. Stewart failed to qualify for the race, while Kasey Kahne qualified for the race, and sat on the front row of the second feature. Stewart returned in 2012 to dominate the second 30 lap feature. For 2016, the Silver Cup race reverted to a single feature format, with David Gravel scoring the win.

Recent Don Martin Silver Cup Winners

- 2026 - Corey Day
- 2025 - Carson Macedo
- 2024 - Rico Abreu
- 2023 - Kyle Larson
- 2022 - Kyle Larson
- 2021 - Brad Sweet
- 2020 - Donny Schatz
- 2019 - David Gravel
- 2018 - Kyle Larson
- 2017 - Donny Schatz
- 2016 - David Gravel
- 2015 - Overall Dale Blaney; Features- Dale Blaney, Cody Darrah
- 2014 - Overall Donny Schatz; Features- Donny Schatz, Cody Darrah
- 2013 - Overall Donny Schatz; Features- Donny Schatz, Daryn Pittman
- 2012 - Overall Craig Dollansky Features- Craig Dollansky, Tony Stewart
- 2011 - Overall Tim Shaffer Features- Dale Blaney, Tim Shaffer
- 2010 - Overall- Donny Schatz; Features- Lance Dewease, Joey Saldana
- 2009 – Overall-Danny Lasoski Features- Danny Lasoski, Stevie Smith
- 2008 – Steve Kinser
- 2007 – Donny Schatz
- 2006 – Donny Schatz
- 2005 – Tim Shaffer
- 2004 – Sammy Swindell
- 2003 – Rained Out
- 2002 – Ed Lynch Jr.
- 2001 – Mark Kinser
- 2000 – Sammy Swindell
- 1999 - Mark Kinser
- 1998 - Mark Kinser
- 1997 - Mark Kinser
- 1996 - Mark Kinser
- 1995 - Stevie Smith
- 1994 - Steve Kinser
- 1993 - Jeff Swindell
- 1992 - Sammy Swindell (inaugural race)

== Commonwealth Clash ==
The largest paying sprint car race in Lernerville Speedway history (as of 2023, $50,000). The World of Outlaws sanctioned this race until 2022 when the race was sanctioned by the FAST on Dirt 410 series, High Limit sanctioned this race from 2023-2025. USAC Racing now has sanction for the race. In 2024, this event was increased into a 2-day event every 2nd weekend in September.

Before the World of Outlaws moved the race to September, the Commonwealth Clash served as the spring race for the sprint cars.

Most recent Commonwealth Clash winners

- 2026 - Logan Seavey, Night 2 Rained Out
- 2025 - Tanner Thorson, Daison Pursley
- 2024 - Corey Day, Tyler Courtney
- 2023 - David Gravel
- 2022 - Aaron Reutzel
- 2021 - David Gravel
- 2020 - David Gravel
- 2019 - Brad Sweet
- 2018 - Brad Sweet
- 2017 - David Gravel
- 2016 - Donny Schatz
- 2015 - Rained Out
- 2014 - Joey Saldana
- 2013 - Rained Out
- 2012 - Dale Blaney
- 2011 - Jason Meyers
- 2010 - Donny Schatz
- 2009 - Rained Out
- 2008 - Jason Meyers
- 2007 - Steve Kinser
- 2006 - Dean Jacobs
- 2005 - Steve Kinser
- 2004 - Steve Kinser
- 2003 - Donny Schatz

Inaugural - Stevie Smith

== Firecracker 100 ==
The largest paying race for the late models is the Firecracker 100, held on the third weekend of June. The race draws some of the best traveling late models drivers from the northeast and midwest to compete in the 100 lap feature. In addition, the Uncle Sam 30 is run for those that do not qualify for the 100 lap A-main. In 2022, the event will be sanctioned by the Lucas Oil Late Model Dirt Series, ending its affiliation with World Of Outlaws after 14 years.

- 2007- Lernerville held the inaugural Firecracker 100 for the World of Outlaws Late Model Series which was won by Scott Bloomquist.
- 2008- The 2nd Annual Firecracker 100 was won by Iowa native Brian Birkhofer.
- 2009- The 3rd Annual Firecracker 100 went to Jimmy Mars, a native of Wisconsin. He overcame a flat tire early, following contact with Mike Blose. He then would storm back through the field, passing Darrell Lanigan on lap 91. Florida native Earl Pearson Jr. ended up 3rd, while Lanigan was 2nd.
- 2010- The 4th Annual Firecracker 100 featured a new three-day format, including two 30 lap preliminaries that set the stage for the 100 lap race. The two preliminaries were won by Josh Richards and Tim McCreadie. The Firecracker 100 was won by Georgia native Shane Clanton. Clanton passed Tim McCreadie on a late restart to take the $30,000 purse. Darrell Lanigan finished 2nd for the third straight year, while 2009 winner Jimmy Mars finished 3rd.
- 2011- The 5th Annual Firecracker 100 was again staged over the course of three race nights. The two Preliminary features were won by past World Of Outlaw Champion Josh Richards and the inaugural Firecracker 100 Champion Scott Bloomquist. The first night of preliminary action saw a very fast surface, with Rick Eckert breaking the track record in qualify (15.000). The final night of racing featured a much slower and slicker surface. Fittingly, the "Ice Man" Jimmy Mars mastered the slick surface, becoming the first repeat winner of this race. Mars passed Scott Bloomquist early in the race, and easily cruised to the win. Bloomquist would finish in 2nd behind Mars, but would stage a protest on Mars' tires following the race. Mars would later be confirmed as the race winner after lab tests confirmed he used legal tires.
- 2012- The 6th Annual Firecracker 100 weekend took place over three nights with many firsts. Scott Bloomquist was able to win the night one preliminary after passing Mike Marlar late in the 30 lap race. The next night saw the first win by a native Pennsylvanian during the Firecracker 100, as Dan Stone was able to hold off Bloomquist to win the 30 lap race. The finale 100 lapper saw Scott Bloomquist dominate, leading 99 of 100 laps. Darrell Lanigan and past winner Shane Clanton each closed in on Bloomquist but could never make the pass. Langian finished 2nd for the fourth time in the 100 lapper, with Tim McCreadie 3rd, Clanton 4th, and Dale McDowell 5th. This was the first time a driver has won a preliminary and the 100 lap feature. Also, Jared Miley was the first Lernerville Regular to score a top 10 finish, after crossing the line in 8th from his 23rd starting position.
- 2013- The 7th Annual Firecracker 100 was swept by the "Rocketman" Josh Richards, becoming the first driver to sweep all three features including both preliminary 30 lap features and the Firecracker 100 Finale. Heavy rains plagued the entire weekend, which created a very wet and tacky surface for the 100 lapper with a large, rough cushion. This was unlike any prior Firecracker 100, which typically features a slicker, slower track. This caused many cars to experience motor troubles and blown tires, creating 11 cautions and 2 red flags which led to only 10 cars running at the finish among the 28 car starting field. Richards passed two time Firecracker 100 Champion Scott Bloomquist and never relinquished the lead again. Several challengers to Richards experienced troubles throughout the race: 2010 Champion Shane Clanton hit the cushion and blew a tire on lap 49 while closing for the lead, John Blankenship also hit the cushion and broke his nose piece while closing for the lead on lap 51, Bloomquist blew a motor on lap 69 while running 2nd, Rick Eckert broke a rear end while battling for the lead in the closing laps. Tim McCreadie settled for second, while Darrell Langian came up short once again finishing 3rd. Gregg Satterlee rallied to finish 4th after pitting for tires, becoming just the second Pennsylvania driver to score a top 5 finish in the Firecracker. First time entry Jared Landers came home 5th.
- 2014- The 8th Annual Firecracker 100 was won by World of Outlaws regular Darrell Lanigan. After coming very close in previous Firecrackers, Lanigan finally captured this prestige race. The event was called with 10 laps to go, as a heavy rain fell on the track. Lanigan held off the charges from two-time winner Scott Bloomquist, while John Blankenship, Dale McDowell and Jimmy Mars rounded out the top five. Georgia's Jonathan Davenport led the first 67 laps in impressive fashion but mechanical troubles ended his night. "Club 29" Racecars swept the weekend, as Lanigan won the 30 lap preliminary Thursday and Jimmy Owens (his first appearance since 2009) won on Friday. Bloomquist finished runner-up on all three nights.
- 2015- The 2015 Firecracker 100 was won by Rick Eckert, who became the first Pennsylvania driver to win the event. Eckert passed local standout Jared Miley on lap 64 and then pulled away from Shane Clanton in the latter stages en route to victory. Miley, who led the first 63 laps, finished 3rd, marking the highest finisher for a local driver in the Firecracker 100. Clanton and Chase Junghans won the preliminarily events before the original Firecracker 100 was rained out in June. The race was rescheduled on Labor Day weekend, along with the Working Man 50, which was also won by Clanton.
- 2016- The 10th Annual Firecracker 100 was won by Scott Bloomquist, who became the first three-time winner of the event. Bloomquist advanced from the 8th starting position to pass early race leader Dale McDowell on lap 54. Having been disqualified and suspended for racing with illegal tires in the Eldora Speedway Dream earlier in the week, Bloomquist appealed the penalty which allowed him to compete, making the victory for the Tennessee driver a very meaningful one. Josh Richards, McDowell, Earl Pearson Jr. and Jonathan Davenport completed the top five. Richards passed Brandon Overton to claim the first 30 lap preliminary feature on Friday night. But it was Overton who took the victory in the second preliminary Saturday afternoon, as Thursday's event was rained out and rescheduled.
- 2017- The 11th Annual Firecracker 100 was won by Brandon Overton, who held off the advances of Mike Marlar and Tim McCreadie. For the first time, the race went caution free. Former winners Scott Bloomquist and Darrell Lanigan suffered mechanical woes in the very early stages of the race. Heavy rains impacted the event once again, forcing a double header race in one day for the event and caused the track to be very difficult to pass for the 100 lap event. Overton led all 100 laps from the pole although McCreadie and Marlar were in striking distance for much of the race. All top 10 finishers had never won the event before.
- 2018- The 12th Annual Firecracker 100 saw South Carolina’s Chris Madden dominate, leading all 100 laps. Mike Marlar finished runner up for consecutive years, while Tyler Erb, Devin Moran and Dale McDowell rounded out the top five. Madden was also victorious in Thursday’s 30 lap preliminary feature. Friday’s preliminary saw local favorite and Lernerville track champion Michael Norris score his first career World Of Outlaws feature. Marlar set a new track record during qualifying with a lap of 14.812. Despite several rounds of rain showers throughout the weekend, all racing was completed as scheduled.
- 2019- The 13th annual Firecracker 100 saw Tim McCreadie victorious with an outstanding late race pass of Darrell Lanigan. Brandon Sheppard held the top spot until lap 60 when WoO rookie Ricky Weiss charged from the 7th starting spot to take command. Weiss looked to be on his way to victory as the race remained caution free, while Lanigan advanced to 2nd and McCreadie charged from 11th to 3rd. But on lap 95, a tire failure ended Weiss’ bid for victory and brought out the caution to set up a short dash to the finish. McCreadie used the high groove momentum to power past Lanigan and held on to victory by just 0.377 seconds. For the second straight year, local favorite Michael Norris won the 30 lap preliminary on Friday night. Thursday’s prelim was not raced due to drenching rain.
- 2020— Cade Dillard dominated the 14th Annual Firecracker event, which saw a new format featuring only a 50 lap finale and two 25 lap preliminaries. Dillard led all 50 laps and was never challenged on his way to the biggest win of his career to date. Thursday’s prelim was won by Pennsylvania native Max Blair, who made contact and sent Brandon Sheppard spinning on the final lap as the two battled for the victory. Sheppard came back to win Friday’s prelim, holding off local favorite Michael Norris. The event was one of the first major races to be completed for the World Of Outlaws during the COVID-19 pandemic.
- 2021- The 15th annual Firecracker 100 was won by Brandon Overton, who became the third different repeat winner, following his first victory in 2017. Overton took command of the race on the 40th circuit, as he charged past early race leader Chris Madden. Following a lap 51 caution, the caution car Brent Larson made contact with Overton while catching up to the field, slightly damaging the #76 Longhorn chassis. However, it would not slow down Overton as he remained in control and was unchallenged the rest of the race. Madden finished 2nd, while Dennis Erb Jr. rounded out the podium and Darrell Lanigan charged to finish 4th from the 21st starting position. Thursday prelim winner Brandon Sheppard was 5th. Overton was also victorious in the Friday prelim.
- 2022- The 16th annual Firecracker 100 was the first to be sanctioned by the Lucas Oil Dirt Late Model Series and was won by Tim McCreadie for the second time. McCreadie, the 2021 Lucas Series champion, led all 100 laps to claim the largest purse in Lernerville history totaling $50,000. Two time and defending winner Brandon Overton finished a close second but was unable to catch McCreadie in the closing laps as the leaders dealt with lap traffic. Mike Marlar, who had dominating wins in both Thursday and Friday’s preliminary features, would settle for 3rd in the 100 lap event. Polesitter Brandon Sheppard finished in 4th and Earl Pearson Jr. was 5th. 56 total drivers entered the event, the largest car count since 2013. Florida’s Mark Whitener was victorious for the second straight year in the RUSH crate event, earning a $20,000 prize in the 50 lap event.
- 2023- The 17th Annual Firecracker 100 saw Ricky Thornton Jr. claim the $50,000 top prize for the first time. The event saw three different leaders; Jonathan Davenport led laps 1-44, while Hudson O’Neal and Thornton exchanged the lead several times up until lap 81, when Thornton took the lead for good. O’Neal finished 2nd ahead of Davenport with Gregg Satterlee 4th and Devin Moran 5th. Max Blair won the 20k RUSH Crate late model feature for the third time.
- 2024- The 18th annual Firecracker 100 was won by Ricky Thornton Jr. in dominating fashion with a margin of victory of over 12 seconds.Thornton Jr. became the first driver to win the event in consecutive years. He passed early leader Mike Marlar on lap 45 and was unchallenged the rest of the race, lapping up to 8th place. Devin Moran advanced from 16th to finish 2nd, Marlar rounded out the podium with Jonathan Davenport 4th and pole sitter Drake Troutman 5th. Several cautions slowed the early pace, but the final 89 laps saw no incidents to the checkered flag. In the RUSH crate event, Dave Hess Jr. passed race long leader Bryce Davis at the white flag to claim the 20k purse.
- 2025- The 19th annual Firecracker 100 was won by Jonathan Davenport for the first time in his career. Davenport advanced past polesitter Ricky Thornton Jr from the 3rd starting position to take the lead on lap 2. At times, Davenport held nearly a straightaway lead over Thornton, including pulling away following several restarts. Max Blair drove to the runner up spot by lap 84, when one final restart provided Davenport’s biggest hurdle to victory. Blair made contact with Davenport in turn 3, resulting in Thornton making significant contact with Davenport in turn 4, allowing the 20RT to lead lap 85. However, Davenport would again take the lead the following lap and lead the rest of the way. Thornton finished 2nd, Blair 3rd, Garrett Alberson 4th and Mason Zeigler 5th. Zeigler was also the winner of the RUSH crate late model feature.
- 2026- The 20th annual Firecracker 100 was won by Devin Moran for the first time, driving the #99 Longhorn chassis. Moran fell back to as far as 7th place by lap 30, but then made a charge all the way to 2nd by lap 50 as he only trailed race long leader Brandon Sheppard. Following a lap 75 restart, Moran primarily utilized the very outer groove to charge by Sheppard on lap 80. The final 20 laps saw a close side by side battle for many laps with Moran ultimately prevailing by 0.700 seconds over Sheppard. Hudson Oneal, Brandon Overton and Josh Rice rounded out the top 5. Past champion Ricky Thornton Jr. started on the pole but never was a factor after fading earlier in the race. Blair scored the 20k RUSH late model feature victory for the 4th time in his career.

=== Past winners ===
- 2026 - Devin Moran
- 2025 - Jonathan Davenport
- 2024 - Ricky Thornton Jr.
- 2023 - Ricky Thornton Jr.
- 2022 - Tim McCreadie
- 2021 - Brandon Overton
- 2020 - Cade Dillard
- 2019 - Tim McCreadie
- 2018 - Chris Madden
- 2017 - Brandon Overton
- 2016 - Scott Bloomquist
- 2015 - Rick Eckert
- 2014 - Darrell Lanigan
- 2013 - Josh Richards
- 2012 - Scott Bloomquist
- 2011 - Jimmy Mars
- 2010 - Shane Clanton
- 2009 – Jimmy Mars
- 2008 – Brian Birkhofer
- 2007 – Scott Bloomquist

== Bill Emig Memorial ==
The track hosts the RUSH Late Model Series, a Crate Late Model series, for the Bill Emig Memorial in a $20,000 to win race every June. It is one of the highest paying races in all of Crate Late Model racing.

=== Past winners ===
- 2026 - Max Blair
- 2025 - Mason Zeigler
- 2024 - Dave Hess Jr.
- 2023 - Max Blair
- 2022 - Mark Whitener
- 2021 - Mark Whitener
- 2020 - Max Blair
- 2019 - Max Blair

== History ==
=== Early years and construction ===
Lernerville first opened for racing in 1967. The ground where Lernerville speedway currently is located was once a popular amusement park and skating rink. Their first full year was in 1968. Sprint cars, modifieds and late models were a part of the program.

=== Weekly program ===
Since 1993, Lernerville has run the Sprints, Late Models, Modifieds and Sportsman divisions, thus being the only track in the country to run the "Big 3" (Sprints, Big Block Modifieds, and Super Late Models). Don Martin was promoter of the track until his death in 1993. Dave Bauman took this duty along with Albert "Ouch" Roenigk until Bauman's death in 1998. Ouch Roenigk then took over as sole promoter until 2004, when Barb Bartley and Tom Roenigk were assigned to the position. World Racing Group purchased the speedway in 2005. In 2006, long-time motorsports competitors and fans Gary Risch, Jr. and his dad, Gary Sr., were assigned to the promote the weekly program. In 2015, Tomson Scrap Metal purchased the speedway under an agreement that WRG would operate it for the remainder of the 2015 racing season. The track operates mainly on Friday nights from mid April through mid August. There are also various specials throughout the season on Tuesday and Wednesday nights, along with season-ending specials on Saturdays in September and October.

=== Sanctioning ===
Lernerville runs a weekly program under UMP sanctioning, which includes a tire rule with Hoosier for the Super Late Model division. Most divisions that run at track are UMP sanctioned: 410 Sprints, Super Late Models, Big Block Modifieds, UMP Modifieds, 4 Cylinders. RUSH sanctions the crate engine divisions which include the weekly Pro Stock class, Sportman Modified, Late Model and Wingless Sprint classes.

The track has had tremendous success in its 58 years of racing. The highest-paid winner ever was $50,000 for a High Limit Sprint and Lucas Oil Late Model Dirt Series races. The qualifying track record for 410 sprint cars is held by Brad Sweet (winged), with a lap of 12.300 seconds and Jake Swanson (wingless) with a lap of 15.039 seconds. The late model track record is held by Devin Moran at 14.750 seconds.

=== Television ===
Lernerville has had races televised on SPEED and ESPN2, including the Firecracker 100, The Showdown in Sarvertown, and the Silver Cup WoO events.

== Past Special events ==
Lucas Oil Late Models Firecracker 100, High Limit Racing Silver Cup, All Star Late Model, All Star Sprint Car, Steel City Stampede, USAC Sprint Cars, BRP Modified Tour, FASTRAK Late Models, UFo Late Models, MACS Late Models, ULMS late models, UEMS Modifieds, High Limit Racing Commonwealth Clash.

== See also ==
- Mercer Raceway Park
- Sharon Speedway
- Tri-City Speedway
