= Ralph Quarterson =

American racing driver

- Born: Ralph H. Quarterson Jr. October 11, 1939 Sharon, Pennsylvania, U.S.
- Died: June 23, 2020 (aged 80)
- Retired: 1984

Motorsports career
- Debut season: 1959
- Car number: 66
- Championships: 21
- Wins: 500+

Championship titles
- 1966, 1967, 1968, 1969, 1979 Western Pennsylvania Sprint Championship; 1970 All Star Circuit of Champions

Ralph Quarterson (October 11, 1939 – June 6, 2020) was an American dirt modified and sprint car racing driver. He won over 500 feature events including 149 features and 14 track titles at Mercer Raceway Park, Pennsylvania.

== Racing career ==
Ralph Quarterson began racing in 1959 at the Ashtabula County Fairgrounds in Jefferson, Ohio, garnering his first feature win during his rookie season. He then went on to compete successfully throughout the Mid-Atlantic including Sharon Speedway and Cortland's Expo Speedway, both in Ohio, as well as at Motordrome 70 Speedway in South Huntingdon, Pennsylvania. In addition to his success at Mercer, Quarterson captured seven other Pennsylvania track championships: four at Lernerville Speedway in Sarver, two at Butler Speedway in Prospect, and one at Tri-City Speedway in Franklin.

Quarterson was the inaugural titlist of the All Star Circuit of Champions, and was a five-time winner of Western Pennsylvania Sprint Championship. He was inducted into the Northeast Dirt Modified Hall of Fame in 2010, and the Mercer County Hall of Fame in 2012.
