= Hartford, Trumbull County, Ohio =

Unincorporated community in Ohio, U.S.

Coordinates: 41°18′41″N 80°34′06″W

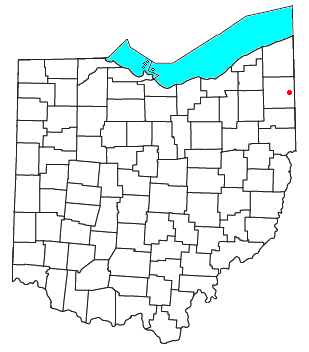
Location of Hartford in Trumbull County, Ohio

Hartford is an unincorporated community in central Hartford Township, Trumbull County, Ohio, United States. It has a post office with the ZIP code 44424. It lies at the intersection of State Routes 7 and 305.

The community is part of the Youngstown-Warren-Boardman, OH-PA Metropolitan Statistical Area.

The first settlement at Hartford was made about 1799; the community takes its name from Hartford, Connecticut.

== Notable people ==
- Dave Blaney – NASCAR driver
- Dale Blaney – Basketball player and Sprint Car driver
- Lou Blaney – Former Sprint Car driver
- Ryan Blaney – NASCAR driver
