= Kevin Bolland =

American racing driver

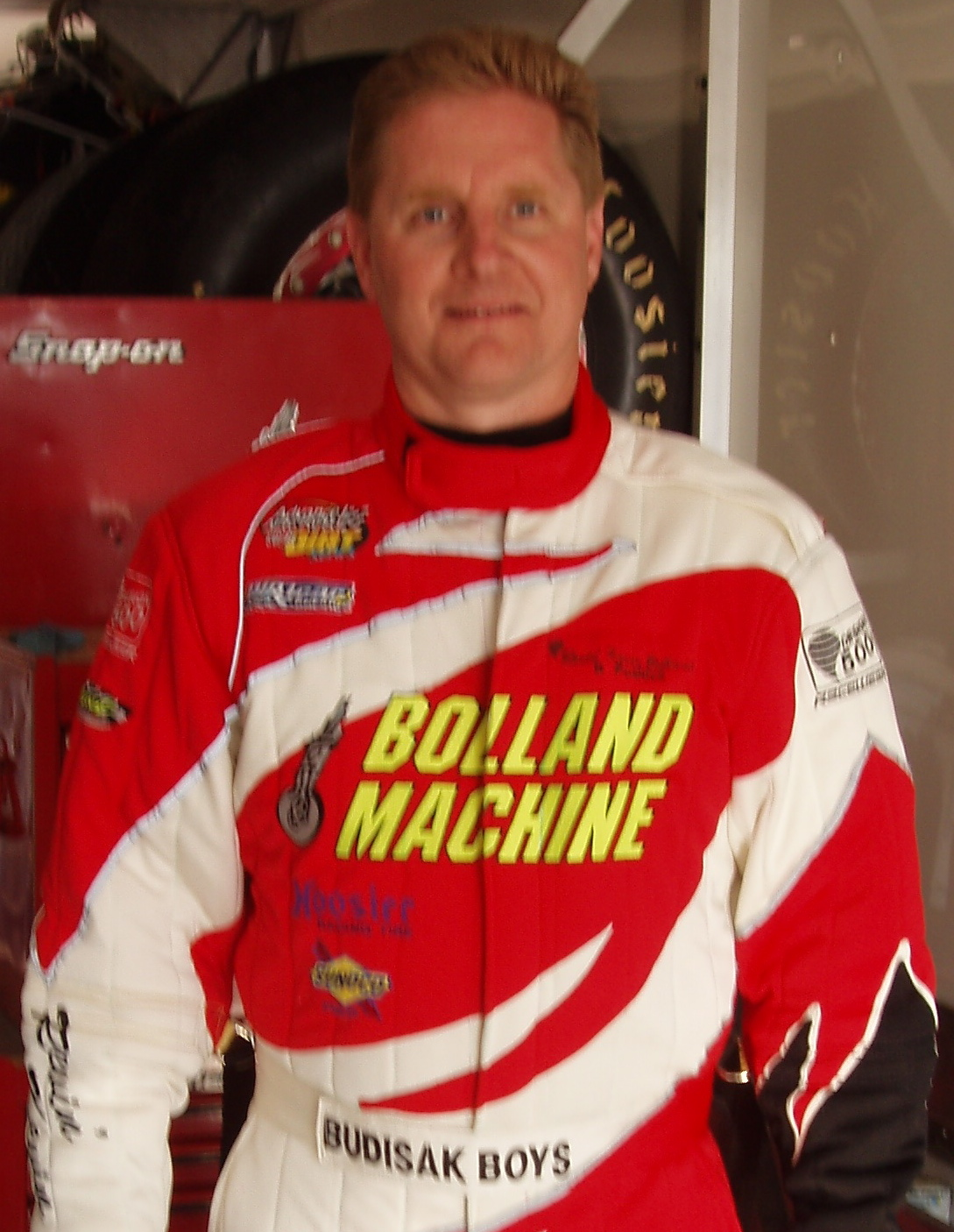
- Bolland in 2007
- Nationality: American
- Born: November 6, 1959 (age 67) New Brighton, Pennsylvania, U.S.

Super DIRTcar Series career
- Debut season: 1982
- Current team: Bol-Tech Motorsports, Inc.
- Car number: 777

Championship titles
- 2002, 2006, 2010 1985, 2000, 2006, 2007, 2008 1982 2009: Lernerville Speedway; Tri-City Speedway Mercer Raceway Park; DIRTcar Western Region

Kevin Bolland (born November 6, 1959) was born in New Brighton, Pennsylvania. Kevin works at their family owned business, Bolland Machine, located in Chippewa Township, PA. He races the #777 DIRTcar Big Block Modified at dirt track circles in the NorthEast.

== Racing career ==
Kevin Bolland's racing experience dates back to his childhood. Like many drivers, his first influence of racing came from his father Don, who introduced him to racing at an early age. The New Brighton, PA, native spent much of his youth driving and winning soap box derbies, which won him a trip to Akron, Ohio, Derby Downs for the world finals in 1971.

In 1979 at the age of 20, Kevin competed and toured the country with the pro motocross series. In the spring of 1979 Kevin suffered a serious motorcycle accident requiring 3 surgeries and 17 months in a cast. While recovering Kevin decided to get into some sort of stock car racing, so his father, Don, contacted friends from his drag racing days. They spoke to Darrell Dean and Ernie Toth for whom Don had built big block Chevy race engines; they introduced him to Jim Cole who built chassis's in Oxford, PA. Shortly after, they ended up putting a car together with Jim Cole. The relationship produced an innovative car design, Jim built the chassis, while Don's engine shop, D&D Rebuilding Service of New Brighton, PA, (now Bolland Machine) built the engine package. The cars first race was driven by Danny Johnson, a NY D.I.R.T. track star at Syracuse's New York State Fairgrounds in October 1981. These events would enable Kevin to make the demanding adjustment from motocross to big block modified dirt racing.

The Bolland family purchased the new “Cole” built chassis and Kevin started racing his own car in the 1982 season as a rookie big block dirt modified driver. This season proved to be a banner year, and as a rookie Kevin won 7 features between Mercer Raceway Park, Lernerville Speedway, and Sharon Speedway. He won the track championship at Mercer, won Lernerville's Invitational Event, and also captured rookie of the year for cavalcade points for western PA.

From that year on, Kevin and the Bolland racing team continued to achieve a reputation for racing and building cars—capturing the 1985 and 2000 Tri-City Speedway track championships.

In 1991 the Bolland family business was growing and Kevin's responsibilities outside of racing were demanding more and more of his time. Bob McIltrot approached Kevin early in the year to ask if he would consider driving for his team. The opportunity afforded Kevin the time to practice his craft and perfect his driving skills. He raced for McIItrot through the 1998 season.

In 1999 the Bolland's created Bol-Tech Motorsports, Inc. and purchased a new 1999 Bicknell chassis and put a team together of their own. They assigned crew members to specific jobs and challenged them to excel. Kevin's father Don was in charge of R&D and engine program. His brother Keith crew chief, and Todd Chamberlain car preparation and chassis stats. Brother Ken and Ron Kosmal in charge of tires. Stephanie Chamberlain was in charge of event statistics. Dave Chamberlain in charge of the car's appearance. Kevin focused on driving, chassis, suspension, and set up.

Bolland attributes his racing success to teamwork, efficient budgeting, and preventative vehicle maintenance. Under this approach, the team won the 2002 Lernerville Speedway Track Championship, finishing in the top three in 56% of their races that year.

== Career highlights ==
- 2010 Lernerville Speedway Track Champion
- 2010 Beaver County Sports Hall of Fame's First Motorsports Inductee
- 2009 DIRTcar Northeast Western Regional Points Champion
- 2009 Weekend of May 22–24: 3 Feature Wins in a Row, including two BRP tour races
- 2009 100th Career Win [04.24.09]
- 2008 Tri-City Speedway Track Champion
- 2008 Lincoln Electric/Goss Gas Iron Man Champion
- 2008 Tri-City Speedway Track Record Holder - 18.358 seconds
- 2007 Tri-City Speedway Track Champion
- 2007 Pittsburgh Circle Track Club Champion
- 2006 Lernerville Speedway Track Champion
- 2006 Tri-City Speedway Track Champion
- 2006 Pittsburgh Circle Track Club Champion
- 2006 Lincoln Electric/Goss Gas Iron Man Champion
- 2006 Winner Lernerville/Tri-City Speedway Big Block Modified Challenge Series
- 2004 Twin State Auto Racing Club Findlay Sportsmanship Award
- 2003 Lowe's Motor Speedway Track Record Holder - 15.642 seconds
- 2003 Winner Eckerd 100 Lowe's Motor Speedway, Charlotte, North Carolina
- 2002 Lernerville Speedway Track Champion
- 2000 Tri-City Speedway Track Champion
- 1985 Tri-City Speedway Track Champion
- 1982 Mercer Raceway Park Track Champion
- 1982 Western PA, Rookie of the Year with 7 Feature Wins
- 1979 Pro Motocross series
- 1971 Beaver Falls, PA, Soap Box Derby Champion

== Media coverage ==
- Bolling Them Over: PA’s Kevin Bolland. Pg. 50
