= Lou Blaney =

American racing driver

- Born: Lewis George Blaney; January 4, 1940 Hartford, Ohio, U.S.
- Died: January 25, 2009 (aged 69)
- Debut season: 1958

Modified racing career
- Years active: 1958-1960; 1978-2002
- Car number: 10
- Championships: 8
- Wins: 200+

Previous series
- 1961-1981 Championships Wins: Sprint car racing 10; 200+

Lewis George "Lou" Blaney (January 4, 1940 – January 25, 2009) was an American racecar driver who raced modifieds and sprint cars. He was also the operator and part-owner of Sharon Speedway.

== Early life ==
Lou Blaney was born in Hartford Township, Trumbull County, Ohio, where his father, George, operated the family sawmill and lumber business. During Lou's youth, George sponsored race cars through his business, Blaney Lumber.

== Racing career ==
Blaney began racing a Cadillac powered 1934 Chevy coupe in 1958 as part of his father's three car team. From 1961 to 1981, he concentrated on the Pennsylvania sprint car circuit, claiming eight track championships at the Lernerville Speedway in Sarver, with additional crowns at Tri-City Speedway in Oakland, and the Jennersville Speedway.

In 1978, Blaney began a transition back to modified racing, ultimately claiming five track championships at Sharon Speedway in Ohio, and three more titles at Lernerville.

Blaney won 600 races in 47 years of racing, and is a member of the Northeast Dirt Modified Hall of Fame, National Sprint Car Hall of Fame, and Pittsburgh Circle Track Club Hall of Fame.

== Personal life ==
Blaney had two sons, both of whom race, as does a grandson. Dave Blaney is a World of Outlaws champion and former NASCAR Cup Series driver along with his son Ryan, who himself is a NASCAR Cup Series champion and Team Penske driver, while Dale Blaney is a sprint car driver. Dale also was a college basketball player and was drafted by the Los Angeles Lakers, but decided not to pursue an NBA career so that he could focus on racing. In 2001, Blaney was diagnosed with Alzheimer's disease.

On January 25, 2009, Blaney died at age 69. He suffered from undisclosed medical problems for some time, and the cause of death was not released by his family. The Lou Blaney Memorial Race runs at Sharon Speedway every year.

== Awards and accomplishments ==
- National Sprint Car Hall of Fame, 2013 inductee
- Eastern Motorsport Press Association Hall of Fame, 2010 inductee
- Northeast Dirt Modified Hall of Fame, 2000 inductee
- Pittsburgh Circle Track Club Halls of Fame, 1997 inductee
- Curbstone Coaches Hall of Fame, 2007 inductee
