= 2013 STP Gas Booster 500 =

Race details
- Race 6 of 36 in the 2013 NASCAR Sprint Cup Series
- A map showing the layout of Martinsville Speedway
- Date: April 7, 2013
- Location: Martinsville Speedway, Ridgeway, Virginia, U.S.
- Course: Permanent racing facility
- Course length: 0.526 miles (0.847 km)
- Distance: 500 laps, 263 mi (423.257 km)
- Weather: Overcast with a temperature around 71 °F (22 °C); wind out of the SSW at 6 miles per hour (9.7 km/h).
- Average speed: 72.066 mph (115.979 km/h)

Pole position
Driver	Jimmie Johnson	Hendrick Motorsports
- Time: 19.244 seconds

Most laps led
Driver	Jimmie Johnson	Hendrick Motorsports
- Laps: 346

Winner
No. 48	Jimmie Johnson	Hendrick Motorsports

Television in the United States
- Network: Fox
- Announcers: Mike Joy, Darrell Waltrip, Larry McReynolds
- Nielsen ratings: 4.4/10 (6.924 million viewers)

The 2013 STP Gas Booster 500 was a NASCAR Sprint Cup Series stock car race held on April 7, 2013, at Martinsville Speedway in Ridgeway, Virginia, United States. Contested over 500 laps on the 0.526-mile (0.847 km) oval, it was the sixth race of the 2013 Sprint Cup Series championship. Jimmie Johnson of Hendrick Motorsports won the race, his record eighth win at the track, and second win of the season, while Clint Bowyer finished second. Jeff Gordon, Kasey Kahne and Kyle Busch rounded out the top five.

This is the first NASCAR race since 2005 UAW Ford 500 without 4-time Martinsville winner Denny Hamlin.

== Report ==
=== Background ===
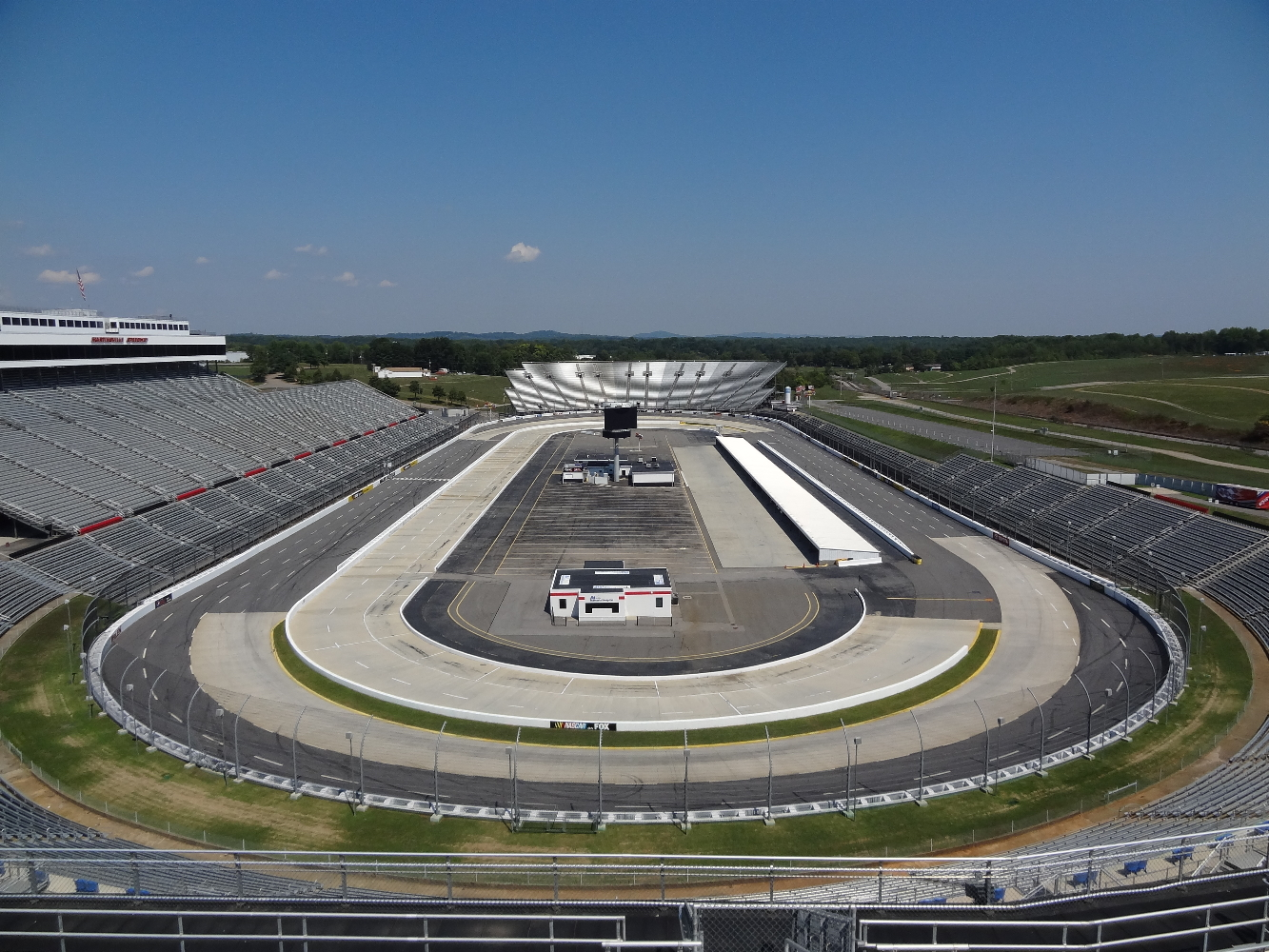
Martinsville Speedway, the race track where the race was held.

Martinsville Speedway is a four-turn short track that is 0.526 miles (0.847 km) long. The track's turns are banked at eleven degrees, while the front stretch, the location of the finish line, has a zero-degree banking. Like the front stretch, the back straight away also doesn't have a banked surface. The race consists of 500 laps, which is equivalent to a race distance of 263 miles (423 km).

Before the race, Dale Earnhardt Jr. was leading the Drivers' Championship with 199 points, while Brad Keselowski stood in second with 187 points. Jimmie Johnson followed in the third position, 19 points ahead of Carl Edwards and Greg Biffle in fourth and fifth. Kyle Busch, with 163, was four points ahead of Kasey Kahne and nine ahead of Paul Menard, as Joey Logano was one point ahead of Denny Hamlin and five ahead of Matt Kenseth in tenth and eleventh. Ricky Stenhouse Jr. completed the first twelve positions with 139 points. The defending winner of the race was Ryan Newman, who won the race in 2012.

=== Entry list ===
(R) - Denotes rookie driver.

(i) - Denotes driver who is ineligible for series driver points.

No.	Driver	Team	Manufacturer
1	Jamie McMurray	Earnhardt Ganassi Racing	Chevrolet
2	Brad Keselowski	Penske Racing	Ford
5	Kasey Kahne	Hendrick Motorsports	Chevrolet
7	Dave Blaney	Tommy Baldwin Racing	Chevrolet
9	Marcos Ambrose	Richard Petty Motorsports	Ford
10	Danica Patrick (R)	Stewart–Haas Racing	Chevrolet
11	Mark Martin	Joe Gibbs Racing	Toyota
13	Casey Mears	Germain Racing	Ford
14	Tony Stewart	Stewart–Haas Racing	Chevrolet
15	Clint Bowyer	Michael Waltrip Racing	Toyota
16	Greg Biffle	Roush Fenway Racing	Ford
17	Ricky Stenhouse Jr. (R)	Roush Fenway Racing	Ford
18	Kyle Busch	Joe Gibbs Racing	Toyota
19	Mike Bliss (i)	Humphrey Smith Racing	Toyota
20	Matt Kenseth	Joe Gibbs Racing	Toyota
22	Joey Logano	Penske Racing	Ford
24	Jeff Gordon	Hendrick Motorsports	Chevrolet
27	Paul Menard	Richard Childress Racing	Chevrolet
29	Kevin Harvick	Richard Childress Racing	Chevrolet
30	David Stremme	Swan Racing	Toyota
31	Jeff Burton	Richard Childress Racing	Chevrolet
32	Ken Schrader	FAS Lane Racing	Ford
33	Landon Cassill	Circle Sport	Chevrolet
34	David Ragan	Front Row Motorsports	Ford
35	Josh Wise (i)	Front Row Motorsports	Ford
36	J. J. Yeley	Tommy Baldwin Racing	Chevrolet
38	David Gilliland	Front Row Motorsports	Ford
39	Ryan Newman	Stewart–Haas Racing	Chevrolet
42	Juan Pablo Montoya	Earnhardt Ganassi Racing	Chevrolet
43	Aric Almirola	Richard Petty Motorsports	Ford
44	Scott Riggs	Xxxtreme Motorsports	Ford
47	Bobby Labonte	JTG Daugherty Racing	Toyota
48	Jimmie Johnson	Hendrick Motorsports	Chevrolet
51	Regan Smith (i)	Phoenix Racing	Chevrolet
55	Brian Vickers (i)	Michael Waltrip Racing	Toyota
56	Martin Truex Jr.	Michael Waltrip Racing	Toyota
78	Kurt Busch	Furniture Row Racing	Chevrolet
83	David Reutimann	BK Racing	Toyota
87	Joe Nemechek (i)	NEMCO-Jay Robinson Racing	Toyota
88	Dale Earnhardt Jr.	Hendrick Motorsports	Chevrolet
93	Travis Kvapil	BK Racing	Toyota
95	Scott Speed	Leavine Family Racing	Ford
98	Michael McDowell	Phil Parsons Racing	Ford
99	Carl Edwards	Roush Fenway Racing	Ford
Official entry list

=== Practice and qualifying ===
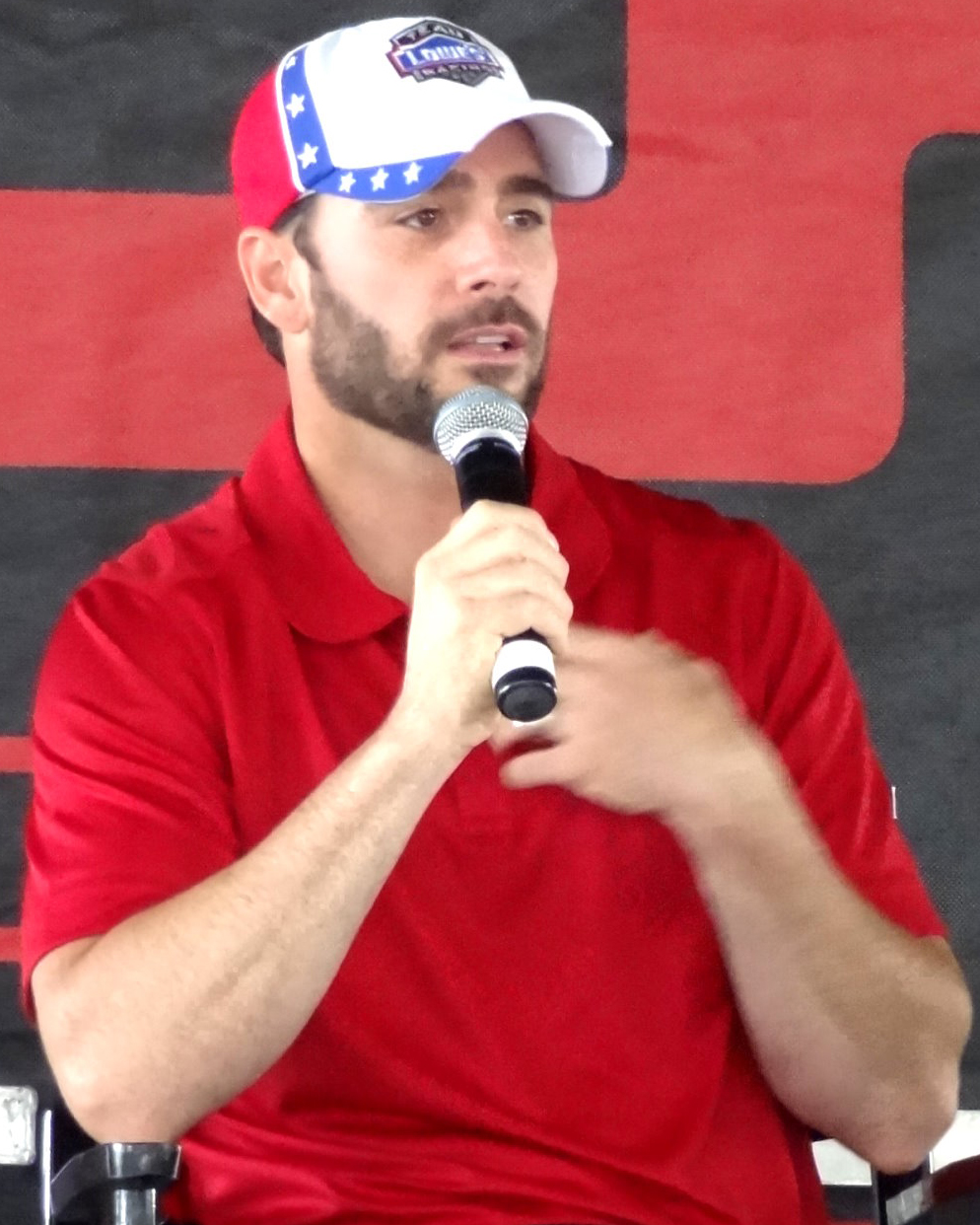
Jimmie Johnson won his 30th pole position during qualifying.

Three practice sessions were scheduled before the race. The first session, held on April 5, was 90 minutes long. The second and third were scheduled on April 6, and were 45 and 60 minutes long. During the first practice session, Johnson was quickest with a time of 19.214 seconds, ahead of Juan Pablo Montoya and Clint Bowyer in second and third. Jeff Gordon followed in the fourth position, ahead of Keselowski in fifth.

In the Saturday morning session, Bowyer was quickest, ahead of Kyle Busch and Gordon in second and third. Brian Vickers and Newman followed in the fourth and fifth positions. Jamie McMurray, Biffle, Jeff Burton, Martin Truex Jr., and Kevin Harvick rounded out the first ten positions. In the final practice session for the race, Bowyer was quickest with a time of 19.518 seconds. Johnson followed in second, ahead of Edwards and Biffle in third and fourth. Burton, who was eighth-quickest in second practice, managed fifth.

During qualifying, forty-four cars were entered, meaning only one car was not able to start because of NASCAR's qualifying procedure. Johnson clinched his thirtieth career pole position, with a time of 19.244 seconds. After his qualifying run, Johnson commented, "In the first run out, we were in (qualifying) trim and made two or three laps, and I knew right away that we had a great shot at it today. At that point, I just needed to do my job and not mess up." He was joined on the front row of the grid by Marcos Ambrose. Vickers qualified third, Logano took fourth, and Kahne started fifth. Gordon, Keselowski., Kenseth, Newman, and Edwards completed the first ten positions on the grid. The driver who failed to qualify for the race was Mike Bliss.

=== Race ===
==== Start ====
The race was started at 1:13 p.m. EST. as Marcos Ambrose led the field to the green flag. A couple of laps later, the first caution came out when Danica Patrick spun in Turn 3. The race restarted on lap 22 as Jimmie Johnson led on the first restart. The second caution came out on lap 70 for Scott Speed, who was stopped on the front stretch. Juan Pablo Montoya won the free pass under caution. The race restarted on lap 77, with Jimmie Johnson the race leader.

==== Second Quarter ====
On Lap 173, the third caution came out for debris on the track. The race restarted on lap 180 and immediately the fourth caution came out for a multi-car wreck on the back straightaway. Jamie McMurray, Marcos Ambrose, and others were involved. The race restarted on lap 197. On lap 246, the fifth caution came out for a crash. The race restarted on lap 248. A few laps later, the sixth caution came out with 244 laps to go. Carl Edwards spun out in Turn 4. The race restarted with 239 laps to go, with Matt Kenseth in the lead.

==== Third quarter ====
The seventh caution came out for Martin Truex Jr. who spun on the track with 219 laps to go. The race restarted with 213 laps to go. The eighth caution came out for the spin of Kurt Busch with 206 laps to go. The race restarted with 201 laps to go. Kyle Busch led the field to the green. The ninth caution came with Ryan Newman cutting a front tire. The race restarted with 131 laps to go. The tenth caution came out with 51 laps to go when Brian Vickers spun out on the back straightaway. Paul Menard won the free pass under caution. The race restarted with 41 laps to go.

==== Fourth quarter ====
The eleventh caution came out with 33 laps to go when Dale Earnhardt Jr. spun out in Turn 4. The race restarted with 27 laps to go. With 13 laps to go, the twelfth caution came out when Kurt Busch caught fire on the front straightaway. The race was red flagged for more than six minutes for clean up. The race restarted with 7 laps to go. Jimmie Johnson won his eighth race at Martinsville.

== Results ==
=== Qualifying ===
Grid	No.	Driver	Team	Manufacturer	Time	Speed
1	48	Jimmie Johnson	Hendrick Motorsports	Chevrolet	19.244	98.400
2	9	Marcos Ambrose	Richard Petty Motorsports	Ford	19. 251	98.364
3	55	Brian Vickers	Michael Waltrip Racing	Toyota	19.266	98.287
4	22	Joey Logano	Penske Racing	Ford	19.269	98.272
5	5	Kasey Kahne	Hendrick Motorsports	Chevrolet	19.286	98.185
6	24	Jeff Gordon	Hendrick Motorsports	Chevrolet	19.286	98.185
7	2	Brad Keselowski	Penske Racing	Ford	19.307	98.078
8	20	Matt Kenseth	Joe Gibbs Racing	Toyota	19.319	98.017
9	39	Ryan Newman	Stewart–Haas Racing	Chevrolet	19.330	97.962
10	99	Carl Edwards	Roush Fenway Racing	Ford	19.330	97.962
11	18	Kyle Busch	Joe Gibbs Racing	Toyota	19.333	97.947
12	56	Martin Truex Jr.	Michael Waltrip Racing	Toyota	19.334	97.941
13	1	Jamie McMurray	Earnhardt Ganassi Racing	Chevrolet	19.352	97.850
14	42	Juan Pablo Montoya	Earnhardt Ganassi Racing	Chevrolet	19.366	97.780
15	15	Clint Bowyer	Michael Waltrip Racing	Toyota	19.378	97.719
16	27	Paul Menard	Richard Childress Racing	Chevrolet	19.393	97.643
17	88	Dale Earnhardt Jr.	Hendrick Motorsports	Chevrolet	19.399	97.613
18	51	Regan Smith	Phoenix Racing	Chevrolet	19.419	97.513
19	78	Kurt Busch	Furniture Row Racing	Chevrolet	19.430	97.458
20	17	Ricky Stenhouse Jr.	Roush Fenway Racing	Ford	19.433	97.442
21	29	Kevin Harvick	Richard Childress Racing	Chevrolet	19.435	97.432
22	16	Greg Biffle	Roush Fenway Racing	Ford	19.438	97.417
23	34	David Ragan	Front Row Motorsports	Ford	19.445	97.382
24	30	David Stremme	Swan Racing	Ford	19.462	97.297
25	93	Travis Kvapil	BK Racing	Toyota	19.472	97.247
26	14	Tony Stewart	Stewart–Haas Racing	Chevrolet	19.478	97.217
27	98	Michael McDowell	Phil Parsons Racing	Toyota	19.487	97.177
28	95	Scott Speed	Leavine Family Racing	Ford	19.512	97.048
29	31	Jeff Burton	Richard Childress Racing	Chevrolet	19.523	96.993
30	38	David Gilliland	Front Row Motorsports	Ford	19.532	96.949
31	47	Bobby Labonte	JTG Daugherty Racing	Toyota	19.541	96.904
32	10	Danica Patrick	Stewart–Haas Racing	Chevrolet	19.542	96.889*
33	33	Landon Cassill	Circle Sport	Chevrolet	19.546	96.879
34	43	Aric Almirola	Richard Petty Motorsports	Ford	19.556	96.830
35	11	Mark Martin	Joe Gibbs Racing	Toyota	19.571	96.755
36	32	Ken Schrader	FAS Lane Racing	Ford	19.587	96.676
37	36	J. J. Yeley	Tommy Baldwin Racing	Chevrolet	19.591	96.657
38	44	Scott Riggs	Xxxtreme Motorsports	Ford	19.603	96.597
39	7	Dave Blaney	Tommy Baldwin Racing	Chevrolet	19.625	96.489
40	83	David Reutimann	BK Racing	Toyota	19.628	96.474
41	13	Casey Mears	Germain Racing	Ford	19.642	96.406
42	35	Josh Wise	Front Row Motorsports	Ford	19.672	96.259
43	87	Joe Nemechek	NEMCO-Jay Robinson Racing	Toyota	19.824	95.521
Failed to Qualify
	19	Mike Bliss	Humphrey Smith Racing	Toyota	19.614	96.543

=== Race results ===
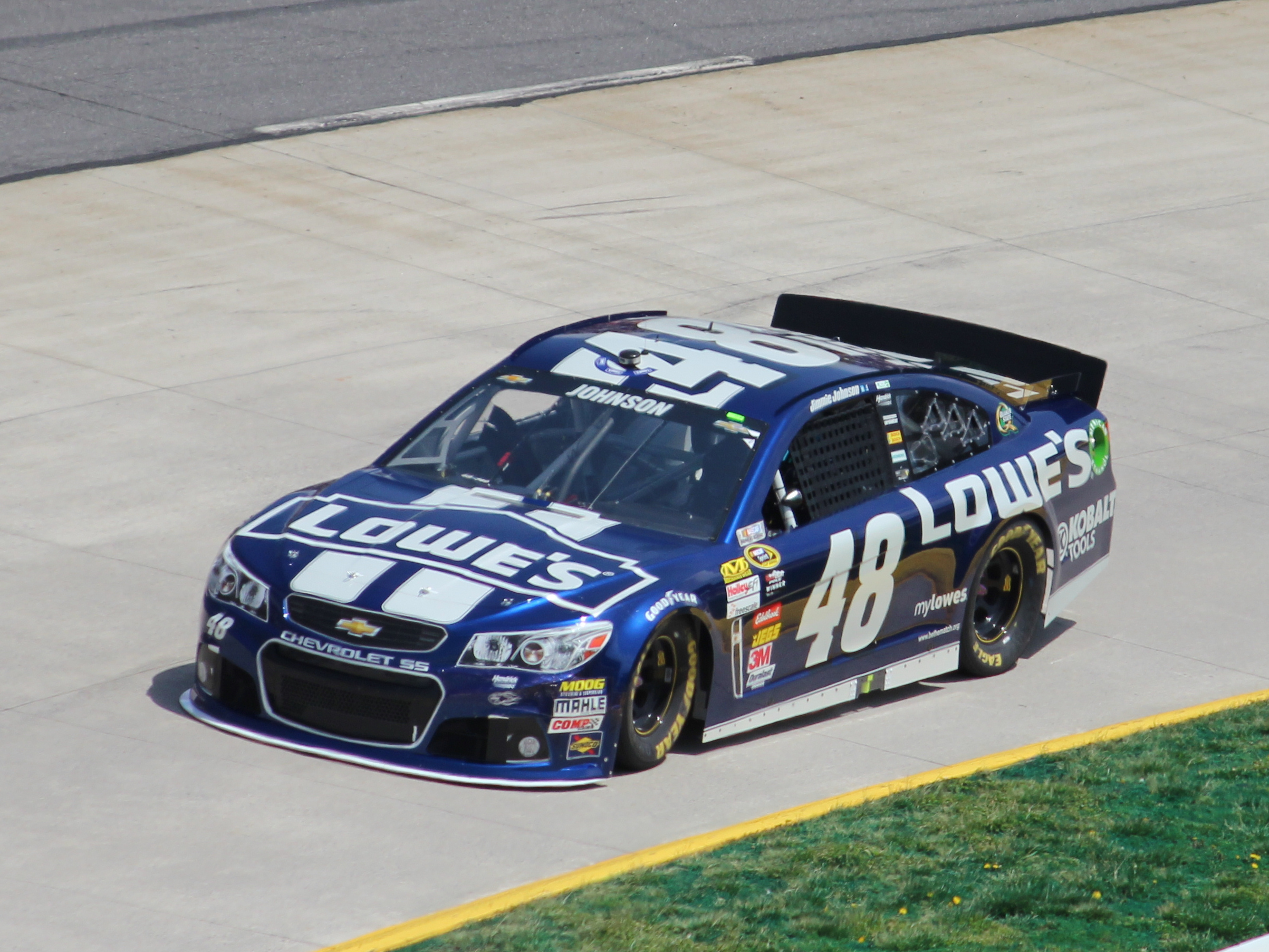
Johnson's car during the race

Pos.	No.	Driver	Team	Manufacturer	Laps	Points
1	48	Jimmie Johnson	Hendrick Motorsports	Chevrolet	500	48
2	15	Clint Bowyer	Michael Waltrip Racing	Toyota	500	42
3	24	Jeff Gordon	Hendrick Motorsports	Chevrolet	500	41
4	5	Kasey Kahne	Hendrick Motorsports	Chevrolet	500	40
5	18	Kyle Busch	Joe Gibbs Racing	Toyota	500	40
6	2	Brad Keselowski	Penske Racing	Ford	500	38
7	1	Jamie McMurray	Earnhardt Ganassi Racing	Chevrolet	500	37
8	9	Marcos Ambrose	Richard Petty Motorsports	Ford	500	37
9	16	Greg Biffle	Roush Fenway Racing	Ford	500	35
10	11	Mark Martin	Joe Gibbs Racing	Toyota	500	34
11	55	Brian Vickers	Michael Waltrip Racing	Toyota	500	–
12	10	Danica Patrick	Stewart–Haas Racing	Chevrolet	500	32
13	29	Kevin Harvick	Richard Childress Racing	Chevrolet	500	31
14	20	Matt Kenseth	Joe Gibbs Racing	Toyota	500	31
15	99	Carl Edwards	Roush Fenway Racing	Ford	500	29
16	13	Casey Mears	Germain Racing	Ford	500	28
17	14	Tony Stewart	Stewart–Haas Racing	Chevrolet	500	27
18	31	Jeff Burton	Richard Childress Racing	Chevrolet	500	26
19	27	Paul Menard	Richard Childress Racing	Chevrolet	500	25
20	43	Aric Almirola	Richard Petty Motorsports	Chevrolet	500	24
21	47	Bobby Labonte	JTG Daugherty Racing	Toyota	500	23
22	51	Regan Smith	Phoenix Racing	Chevrolet	500	–
23	22	Joey Logano	Penske Racing	Ford	499	21
24	88	Dale Earnhardt Jr.	Hendrick Motorsports	Chevrolet	498	20
25	17	Ricky Stenhouse Jr.	Roush Fenway Racing	Ford	498	19
26	42	Juan Pablo Montoya	Earnhardt Ganassi Racing	Chevrolet	497	18
27	36	J. J. Yeley	Tommy Baldwin Racing	Chevrolet	497	17
28	38	David Gilliland	Front Row Motorsports	Ford	496	16
29	7	Dave Blaney	Tommy Baldwin Racing	Chevrolet	495	15
30	34	David Ragan	Front Row Motorsports	Ford	493	14
31	39	Ryan Newman	Stewart–Haas Racing	Chevrolet	492	13
32	32	Ken Schrader	FAS Lane Racing	Ford	492	12
33	33	Landon Cassill	Circle Sport	Chevrolet	492	11
34	87	Joe Nemechek	NEMCO-Jay Robinson Racing	Toyota	491	–
35	35	Josh Wise	Front Row Motorsports	Ford	488	–
36	30	David Stremme	Swan Racing	Toyota	485	8
37	78	Kurt Busch	Furniture Row Racing	Chevrolet	457	7
38	83	David Reutimann	BK Racing	Toyota	457	6
39	93	Travis Kvapil	BK Racing	Toyota	436	6
40	56	Martin Truex Jr.	Michael Waltrip Racing	Toyota	385	4
41	95	Scott Speed	Leavine Family Racing	Ford	64	3
42	44	Scott Riggs	Xxxtreme Motorsports	Ford	47	2
43	98	Michael McDowell	Phil Parsons Racing	Ford	26	1

== Standings after the race ==
Drivers' Championship standings

	Pos	Driver	Points
2	1	Jimmie Johnson	231
	2	Brad Keselowski	225 (–6)
2	3	Dale Earnhardt Jr.	219 (–12)
2	4	Kyle Busch	203 (–28)
2	5	Kasey Kahne	199 (–32)

Manufacturers' Championship standings

Pos	Manufacturer	Points
1	Chevrolet	45
2	Toyota	40 (–5)
3	Ford	29 (–16)

- Note: Only the first twelve positions are included for the driver standings.

Previous race: 2013 Auto Club 400	Sprint Cup Series; 2013 season	Next race: 2013 NRA 500
