= Lynn Geisler =

American racing driver

Lynn Geisler is a dirt late model driver from Cranberry Township, Butler County, Pennsylvania who is a member of the National Dirt Late Model Hall of Fame. He has won over 200 late model races over a racing career spanning four decades. Mr. Geisler has been driving dirt late models in Western Pennsylvania since 1981. In 2011, Mr. Geisler raced at his two home tracks: Lernerville Speedway and PPMS.

== Racing career ==
Lynn Geisler won at least one race a year at Lernerville Speedway from 1982 to 2006, and won 10 features in the 1993 season. He also won five track championships at Lernerville in 1992, 1993, 1994, 1995, and 2006. In total, Geisler has won 108 features at Lernerville and 67 features at Pittsburgh's Pennsylvania Motor Speedway. He has also won six track championships at Pittsburgh. Geisler won the 1995 and 1996 NEWS late model championships and the 1999 and 2000 MACS Championships. More recently, he has only raced at local tracks, mainly Lernerville and Pittsburgh. In 2005, Geisler was inducted in the National Dirt Late Model Hall of Fame. In 2011, Lynn Geisler won a feature event at PPMS, his 71st overall. This makes him a winning driver in four different decades.

== Sponsors ==
Since 1981, #1 Cochran has sponsored Geisler's racing team. His car has been blue, red, and silver and number 1C since this sponsorship was established.

== Race Team ==
Geisler added an additional race team in the 2008 season with Mike Pegher Jr. driving the #1 Cochran Crate Late Model. Pegher has participated in the FASTRAK racing series in the 2008, 2009, and 2010 seasons.

== Family ==
Travis Geisler, Lynn Geisler's son, is also a former dirt and asphalt late model driver who has also raced in the NASCAR Busch Series. More recently, he was a member of NASCAR's Team Penske. He has served as crew chief in the past for Ryan Newman and Sam Hornish Jr. Currently, he is the competition director for Penske.
