= Sharon Speedway =

Race track in Ohio

Coordinates: 41°18′19″N 80°32′57″W

- Address: 3241 Custer Orangeville Road; Hartford, OH 44424
- Opened: 1929

Oval (2002–present)
- Surface: Dirt
- Length: 0.375 mi (0.604 km)

Oval (1929–2001)
- Surface: Dirt
- Length: 0.5 mi (0.80 km)

Sharon Speedway is a 3/8-mile dirt oval race track located in Hartford Township, Ohio and named for the nearby city of Sharon, Pennsylvania. It opened in 1929, making it one of the oldest continuously running dirt ovals in the United States. The track is currently part-owned and operated by the Blaney family, which includes NASCAR driver Dave Blaney and his son Ryan. Dave's father and former driver, Lou Blaney, originally assisted in the operation of the track until his death on January 25, 2009.

The track currently hosts several major touring series including the World of Outlaws Late Model Series and even hosted a NASCAR Grand National Series race in 1954. It was a 200-lap event in which Lee Petty held off Buck Baker and Herb Thomas for the win. Rusty Wallace, Tom Sneva, Tony Stewart, Lee Petty, Clint Bowyer, Kevin Harvick, and Chase Elliott are among drivers who have competed at the racetrack. Sharon Speedway hosted the All Star Circuit of Champions in the 2023 season, along with a ASCoC event on July 8 for the 15th Annual Lou Blaney Memorial.

== Other local tracks ==
- Mercer Raceway Park
- Tri-City Speedway
- Pittsburgh's Pennsylvania Motor Speedway
- Lernerville Speedway
