= Hartford Township, Trumbull County, Ohio =

Township in Ohio, US

- Township
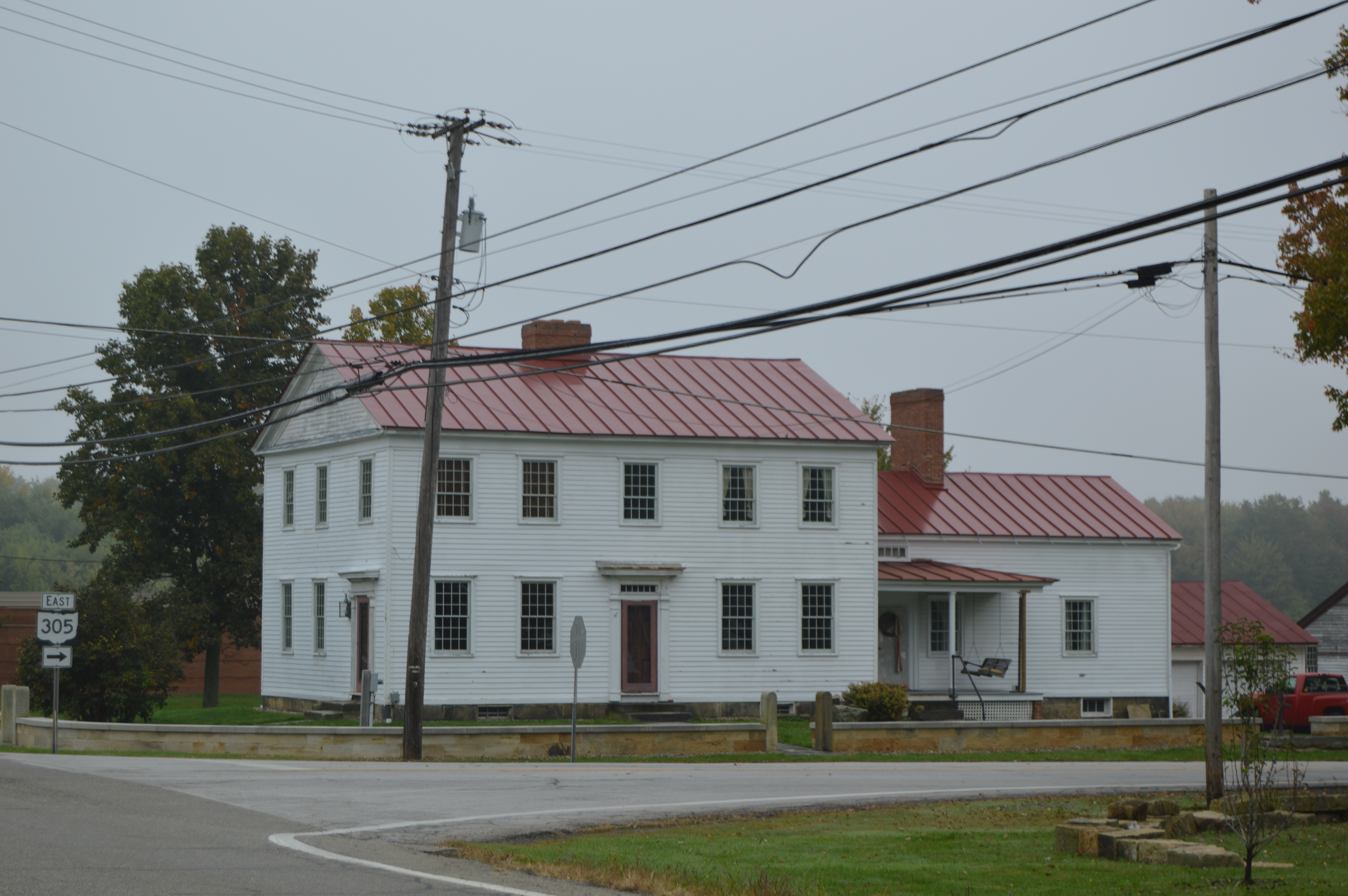
- Elam Jones Public House at Hartford Center

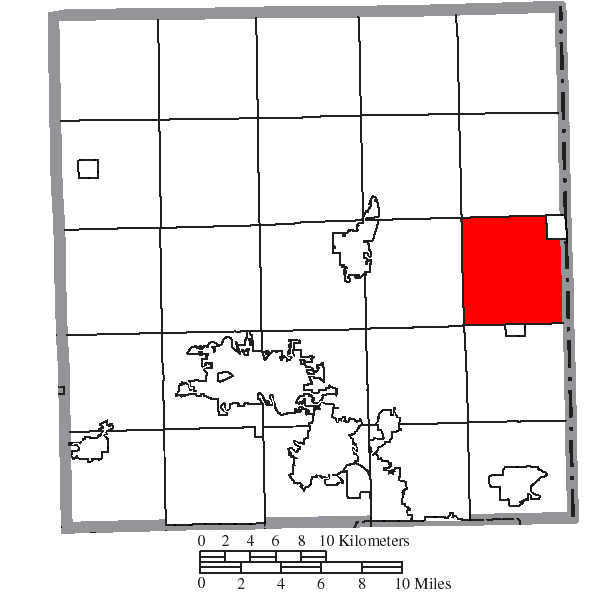
- Location of Hartford Township in Trumbull County
- Coordinates: 41°18′42″N 80°34′15″W
- Country: United States
- State: Ohio
- County: Trumbull

Area
  - Total: 26.5 sq mi (68.7 km^{2})
  - Land: 26.4 sq mi (68.5 km^{2})
  - Water: 0.077 sq mi (0.2 km^{2})
- Elevation: 1,201 ft (366 m)

Population (2020)
  - Total: 1,861
  - Density: 70/sq mi (27.2/km^{2})
- Time zone: UTC-5 (Eastern (EST))
  - Summer (DST): UTC-4 (EDT)
- ZIP code: 44424
- Area codes: 234/330
- FIPS code: 39-34230
- GNIS feature ID: 1087032

Hartford Township is one of the twenty-four townships of Trumbull County, Ohio, United States. The 2020 census found 1,861 people in the township.

== Geography ==
Located in the eastern part of the county, it borders the following townships:

- Vernon Township - north
- South Pymatuning Township, Mercer County, Pennsylvania - east
- Brookfield Township - south
- Vienna Township - southwest corner
- Fowler Township - west
- Johnston Township - northwest corner

The village of Orangeville is located in northeastern Hartford Township, and the unincorporated community of Hartford lies at the center of the township.

== Name and history ==
Hartford Township was named after Hartford, Connecticut.

Statewide, the only other Hartford Township is located in Licking County.

== Government ==
The township is governed by a three-member board of trustees, who are elected in November of odd-numbered years to a four-year term beginning on the following January 1. Two are elected in the year after the presidential election and one is elected in the year before it. There is also an elected township fiscal officer, who serves a four-year term beginning on April 1 of the year after the election, which is held in November of the year before the presidential election. Vacancies in the fiscal officership or on the board of trustees are filled by the remaining trustees.

== Notable residents ==
- Dale Blaney, racing driver and basketball player
- Dave Blaney, NASCAR driver
- Lou Blaney, racing driver
- Ryan Blaney, NASCAR driver, son of driver Dave Blaney, 2023 NASCAR Cup Series Champion
