= Dale Blaney =

American motorsports racer and former basketball player

- Born: Dale Allen Blaney; January 30, 1964 (age 62) Hartford Township, Trumbull County, Ohio, U.S.
- Relatives: Dave Blaney (brother); Ryan Blaney (nephew); Lou Blaney (father)

All Star Circuit of Champions career
- Championships: 6
- Wins: 137
- Best finish: 1st in 1995-1996, 2008, 2013-2015

Championship titles
- 2000: Kings Royal

Dale Allen Blaney (born January 30, 1964) is an American professional race car driver, former professional basketball player, and is currently an assistant coach for the Westminster College basketball team.

Blaney is the oldest winner of the World of Outlaws at age 61.

== Basketball career ==
Blaney was a basketball star for West Virginia University. He averaged 12.3 points a game. He also had several honors, including the Atlantic 10 all-rookie team, all-tournament team (twice), all-conference team, and player of the week on December 1, 1985. He was drafted by the Los Angeles Lakers in 1986, but quit before the 1986–87 season started so he could focus on racing as a career. In 1989 he played for the Youngstown Pride of the World Basketball League.

== Racing career ==
Blaney is a six-time champion of the All Star Circuit of Champions and, as of July 2019, has recorded 137 career victories with the series. He also has 11 victories with the World of Outlaws, the top touring series in sprint car racing.

== Personal life ==
Blaney was born in Hartford, Ohio on January 30, 1964. He is the brother of former WOO and NASCAR Sprint Cup Series driver Dave Blaney and uncle of 2023 NASCAR Cup Series champion Ryan Blaney. He has one daughter Leah and two grandchildren, Louden and Landen.
