= Dave Blaney =

American racing driver (born 1962)

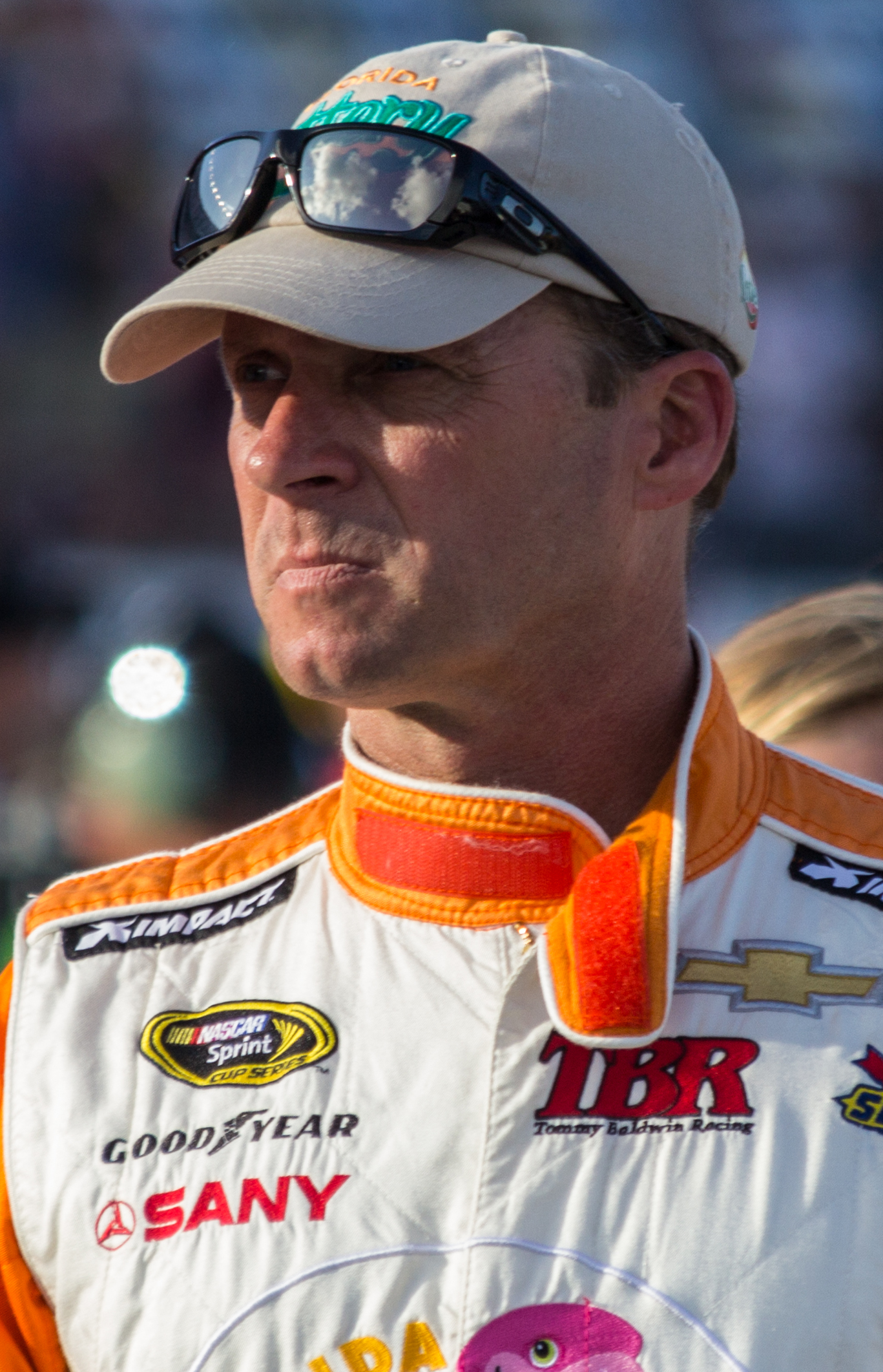
- Blaney at Daytona International Speedway in 2013
- Born: David Louis Blaney; October 24, 1962 (age 64); Hartford Township, Trumbull County, Ohio, U.S.
- Achievements: 1984 USAC Silver Crown Champion; 1995 World of Outlaws Champion; 1993 Chili Bowl Nationals Winner; 1993, 1995 Kings Royal Winner; 1997 Knoxville Nationals Winner; 1997 Gold Cup Champion; 1997 Historical Big One Winner; 7th All-Time in Career All Star Circuit of Champions Wins (49); 8th All-Time in Career World of Outlaws Wins (95)
- Awards: 1983 All-Star Sprint Circuit Rookie of the Year; 2014 National Sprint Car Hall of Fame Inductee

NASCAR Cup Series career
- 473 races run over 17 years
- 2014 position: 50th
- Best finish: 19th (2002)
- First race: 1992 AC Delco 500 (Rockingham)
- Last race: 2014 Irwin Tools Night Race (Bristol)
Wins	Top tens	Poles
0	28	2

NASCAR O'Reilly Auto Parts Series career
- 121 races run over 12 years
- 2009 position: 79th
- Best finish: 7th (1999)
- First race: 1998 NAPA Auto Parts 300 (Daytona)
- Last race: 2009 Dollar General 300 (Charlotte)
- First win: 2006 Dollar General 300 (Charlotte)
Wins	Top tens	Poles
1	31	7

NASCAR FedEx Freight Truck Series career
- 3 races run over 3 years
- 2013 position: 95th
- Best finish: 74th (2004)
- First race: 2004 MBNA America 200 (Dover)
- Last race: 2013 Mudsummer Classic (Eldora)
Wins	Top tens	Poles
0	3	0

NASCAR Canada Series career
- 1 race run over 1 year
- Best finish: 71st (2002)
- First race: 2002 Canada Day Shootout (Cayuga)
Wins	Top tens	Poles
0	0	0
- Statistics up to date as of August 23, 2014.

David Louis Blaney (born October 24, 1962) is an American semi-retired professional stock car racing driver. Blaney was a successful sprint car driver before he started racing in NASCAR, competing in both the Sprint Cup Series and Nationwide Series. For many years, he was a regular at Super Dirt Week in Syracuse, New York, although he never won that event. He owns Sharon Speedway in Hartford Township, Trumbull County, Ohio. His brother Dale Blaney is a sprint car driver. His son, Ryan Blaney, is the 2023 NASCAR Cup Series Champion. Blaney was also known as "the Buckeye Bullet".

== Sprint car racing career ==
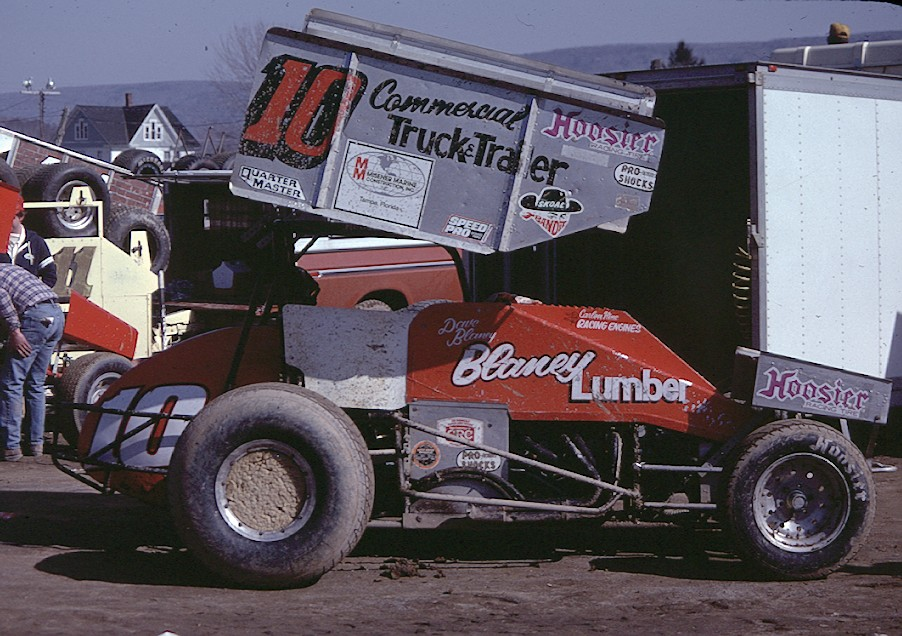
Blaney's 1982 Family Owned Sprint Car

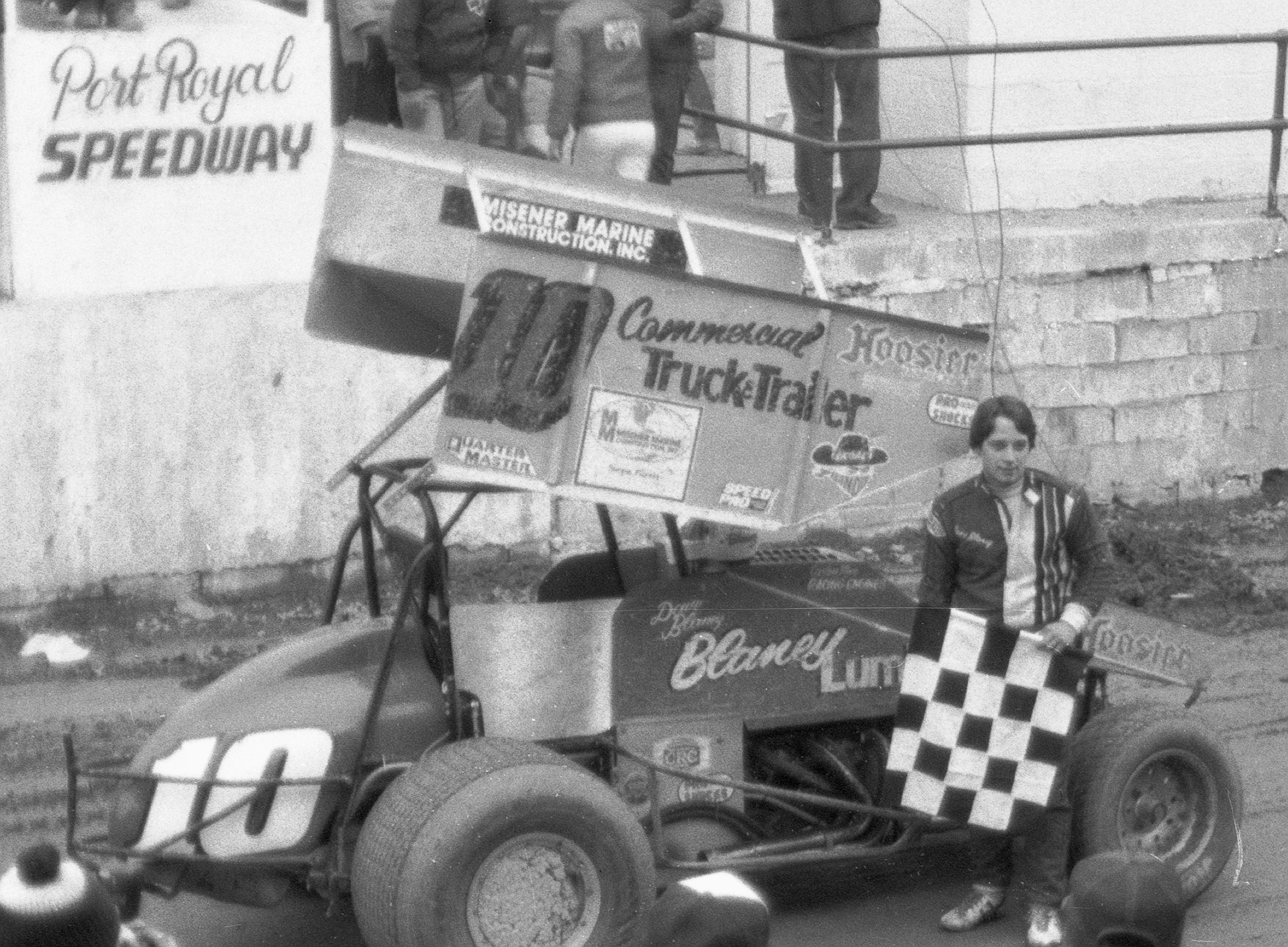
Blaney after a sprint car win at Port Royal Speedway in 1984

Blaney, born in Hartford Township in Trumbull County, Ohio, was awarded the 1983 All-Star Sprint Circuit Rookie-of-the-Year. He raced in the United States Automobile Club (USAC) Silver Crown Series in 1984 and won the national touring series' championship. Blaney won his first World of Outlaws (WoO) race at Eldora Speedway in 1987. He won the 1993 Chili Bowl Midget Nationals. In 1995, he won his second $50,000 to win King's Royal at Eldora Speedway on his way to winning the WoO Championship. In the 1997 season, he won the Gold Cup, and the Knoxville Nationals, which is considered the premiere event in sprint car racing. He was the first driver who did not defend his Knoxville win, when he moved into NASCAR. After moving to NASCAR, he kept his sprint car team going, fielding a car for his brother Dale and the late Kevin Gobrecht. In 2016 after retiring from NASCAR, he drove the Motter Motorsports 71M on a hand-picked schedule of primarily World of Outlaws and All-Star, along with races in central Pennsylvania. In May 2021, Blaney won the World Of Outlaws sprint car feature race at his home track of Sharon Speedway, setting series records for both longest gap between victories—his previous win with the Outlaws came in 1997—and oldest driver to win in the series at 58 years old.

== NASCAR career ==
=== 1998–2005: Early career and team instability ===
Blaney began his Busch Series career in 1998 with Bill Davis Racing, driving the No. 93 Amoco Pontiac and in his first season had three sixth-place finishes and a pole position at Lowe's Motor Speedway. The following season, he ran a full-time schedule and won four poles and ended the season a career-best seventh in points. That season, he returned to the Winston Cup series with Davis, earning a best finish of 23rd at Homestead in the No. 93. In 2000, Blaney and his Amoco team moved up to Winston Cup full-time and posted two top-tens, but DNQ'd in the second race of the season at Rockingham. He finished third in the NASCAR Winston Cup Rookie of the Year award standings for the season. He returned to the Busch Series that year with a limited schedule in BDR's No. 20 AT&T Pontiac, gaining a pole position at Charlotte and also finish third twice. In 2001, the team would switch to Dodge and he would compete in all the races with a best finish of sixth three different times during the season. He left Davis at the end of the season due to sponsorship concerns and signed with the No. 77 Jasper Motorsports team. His best finish during the 2002 season was seventh at Phoenix. Blaney started the 2003 season with three top-tens and a pole the first five races, including a third-place finish at Darlington, but fell to 28th in points at the end of the season, resulting in his release.

Blaney returned to Bill Davis Racing in 2004 for a limited schedule, due to a lack of a sponsorship. Part of his deal was making his Craftsman Truck Series debut for the team in the No. 23 at Dover, where he finished sixth. After two eleventh place finishes, Blaney joined Richard Childress Racing, taking over the No. 30 AOL-sponsored Chevrolet for eight races. After two top-fifteen finishes, he was replaced by Jeff Burton and started one race for Roush Racing in the No. 99 Canteen Vending/Kraft Foods Ford in the place of rookie Carl Edwards, who missed the start due a Craftsman Truck Series race that ran late. Blaney exited the car on lap 24, and Edwards went on to finish 37th after a crash. He also ran the spring race at Richmond International Raceway in the No. 7 Dodge for Ultra Motorsports and finished fortieth. Blaney returned to Richard Childress Racing in 2005 to drive the No. 07 Jack Daniel's Chevrolet. During the season, he would post only two top-ten finishes and finished a dismal 26th in points.

=== 2006–2008: Second Bill Davis Racing stint ===
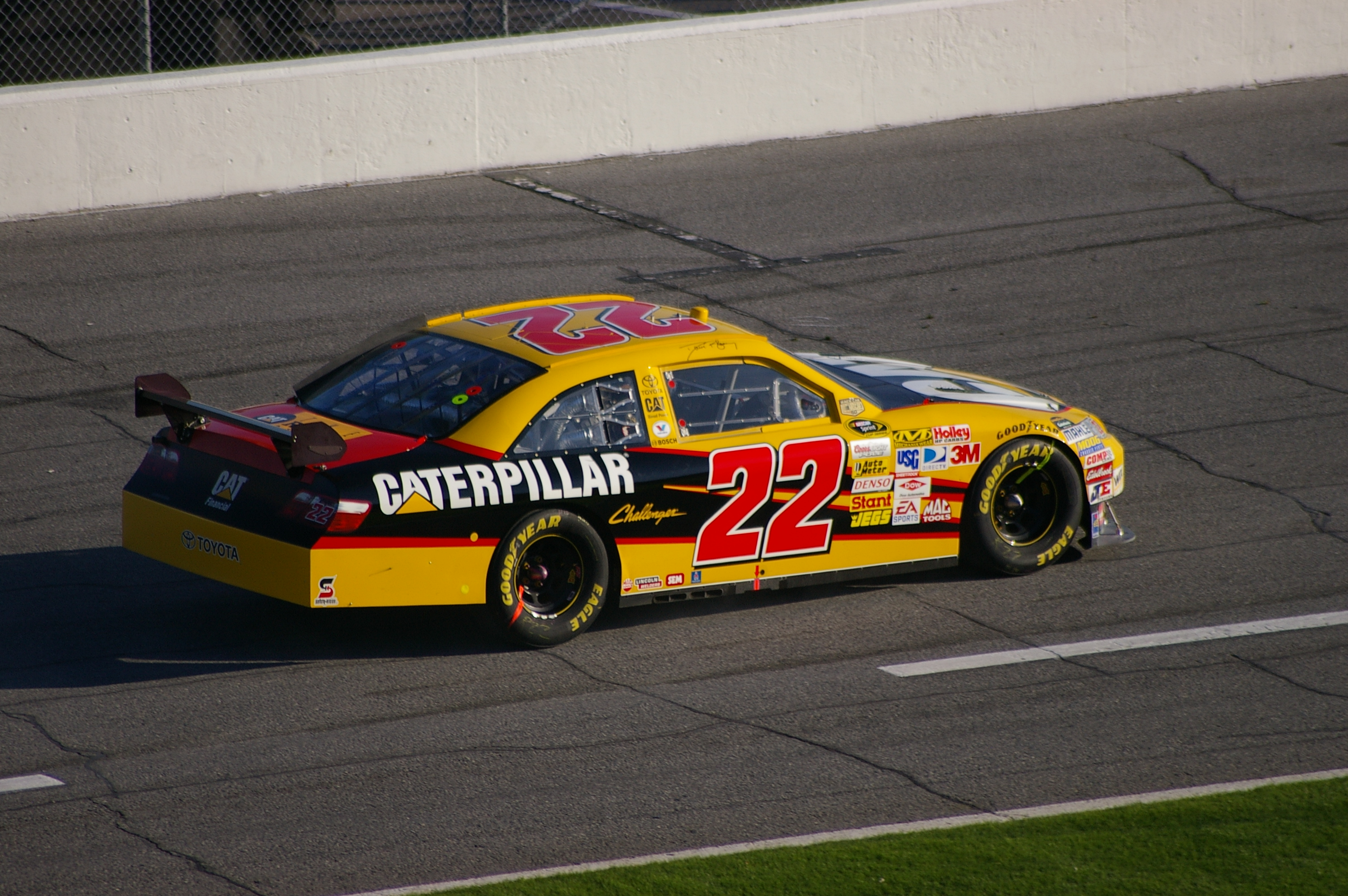
Blaney's 2008 Sprint Cup car

In 2006, he returned to the Bill Davis Racing stable to run the No. 22 Caterpillar Dodge. His best finish in 2006 came at the Richmond International Raceway, where he finished fourth. He also scored his first Busch Series victory at Lowes Motor Speedway, when Matt Kenseth spun on the last lap and Blaney was in the lead. In 2007, BDR switched to Toyota, which had just entered the Cup Series. Blaney almost won the season-opening Busch Series race at Daytona, finishing second to Kevin Harvick. In the Cup Series, Blaney failed to qualify for three races, but got Toyota its first Cup Series pole at Loudon, and finished 31st in points. In 2008, with the Car of Tomorrow being raced full-time, Blaney had two top-tens and moved up to thirtieth in points.

=== 2009–2010: Loss of ride, start-and-park teams ===
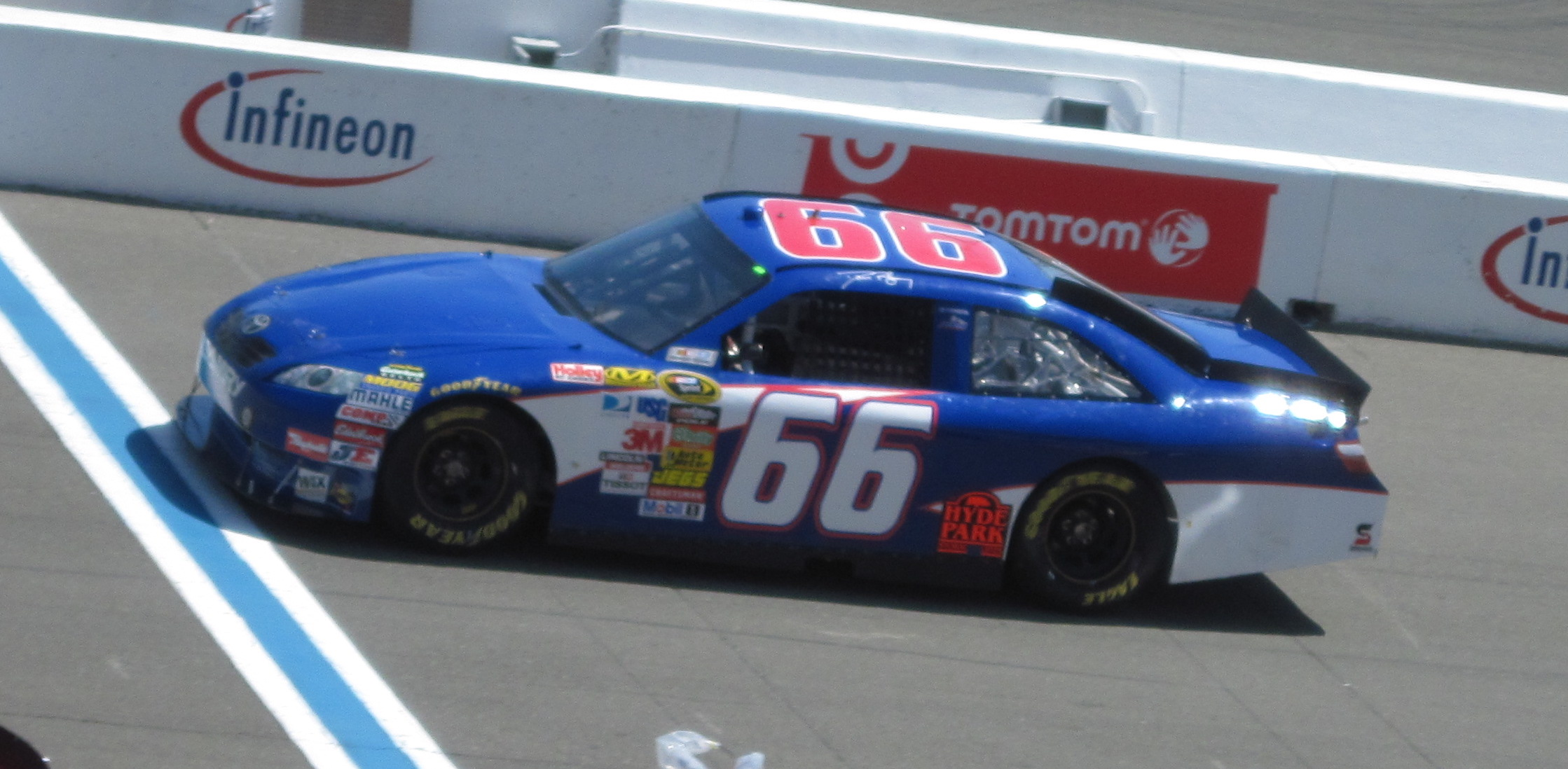
Blaney's No. 66 for Prism Motorsports in 2010

Bill Davis Racing shut down before the 2009 season, leaving Blaney without a ride. In 2009, Blaney signed to run the start and park No. 66 Prism Motorsports Toyota for a full season, getting a best finish of 28th at Charlotte Motor Speedway. Incidentally, Blaney did not qualify for three out of the four races that he had sponsorship for (Hyde Park was on the car at Las Vegas, and the Denny Hamlin Foundation at Charlotte and Texas). With the team continuing to start and park during the 2010 season, Blaney has a best finish of 29th at Las Vegas and led three laps the previous week at Fontana, he has parked his car prior to completion in all but one race this season. For the race at Phoenix, Blaney piloted the No. 55 Prism Toyota, with teammate Michael McDowell driving the No. 66 in an attempt to get both teams in the top-35 in owners points according to team owner Phil Parsons.

For the remainder of the 2010 Sprint Cup season, Blaney split his time between Front Row Motorsports and Tommy Baldwin Racing. Compared to Prism, both teams had some degree of sponsorship; Front Row Motorsports ran full races while Tommy Baldwin Racing was an occasional start and park entry. For example, Blaney ran the entire race at Loudon in the No. 36 with only associate sponsorship from Connecticut-based construction company Mohawk Northeast (owned by Alan Heinke, part owner of TBR) while parking an unsponsored TBR entry at Talladega after twelve laps.

=== 2011–2013: Career recovery with Tommy Baldwin ===
For the 2011 season, Blaney joined Tommy Baldwin Racing for the full season, with the team now committed to running full races. At the 2011 Daytona 500, Blaney received last minute sponsorship from Golden Corral. He led three laps and finished 26th after a late race accident. Blaney piloted the No. 36 Tommy Baldwin Racing Chevrolet with backing from Accell Construction Inc. in several races during the season. Golden Corral returned at the 2011 Aaron's 499, and Blaney led 21 laps but was spun out by Kurt Busch with three laps to go and finished 27th. He led the second most laps behind Clint Bowyer.

On April 27, Tommy Baldwin Racing announced that Blaney and the No. 36 team would be sponsored by Golden Corral for 19 races and Big Red / All Sport for five races leaving only three races without a sponsor. The team did not run the Sprint All-Star Race in May in order to focus on the points-paying events. Blaney finished 3rd at Talladega in the fall, which was the best finish for Tommy Baldwin Racing and tied for his best career finish. Golden Corral returned for three races in 2012, with Ollie's Bargain Outlet, Accell Construction and TMOne sponsoring other races. During the 2012 Daytona 500, Blaney led after 160 laps. During a caution, shortly after race leaders had made pit stops, Juan Pablo Montoya crashed into a jet dryer, which was being used to blow debris from the track. As a result of the crash, the jet fuel that powered the helicopter engine spilled out onto the track and was ignited. NASCAR put the race under a red flag, at which point Blaney had the lead. Blaney finished fifteenth after a crash on lap 196.

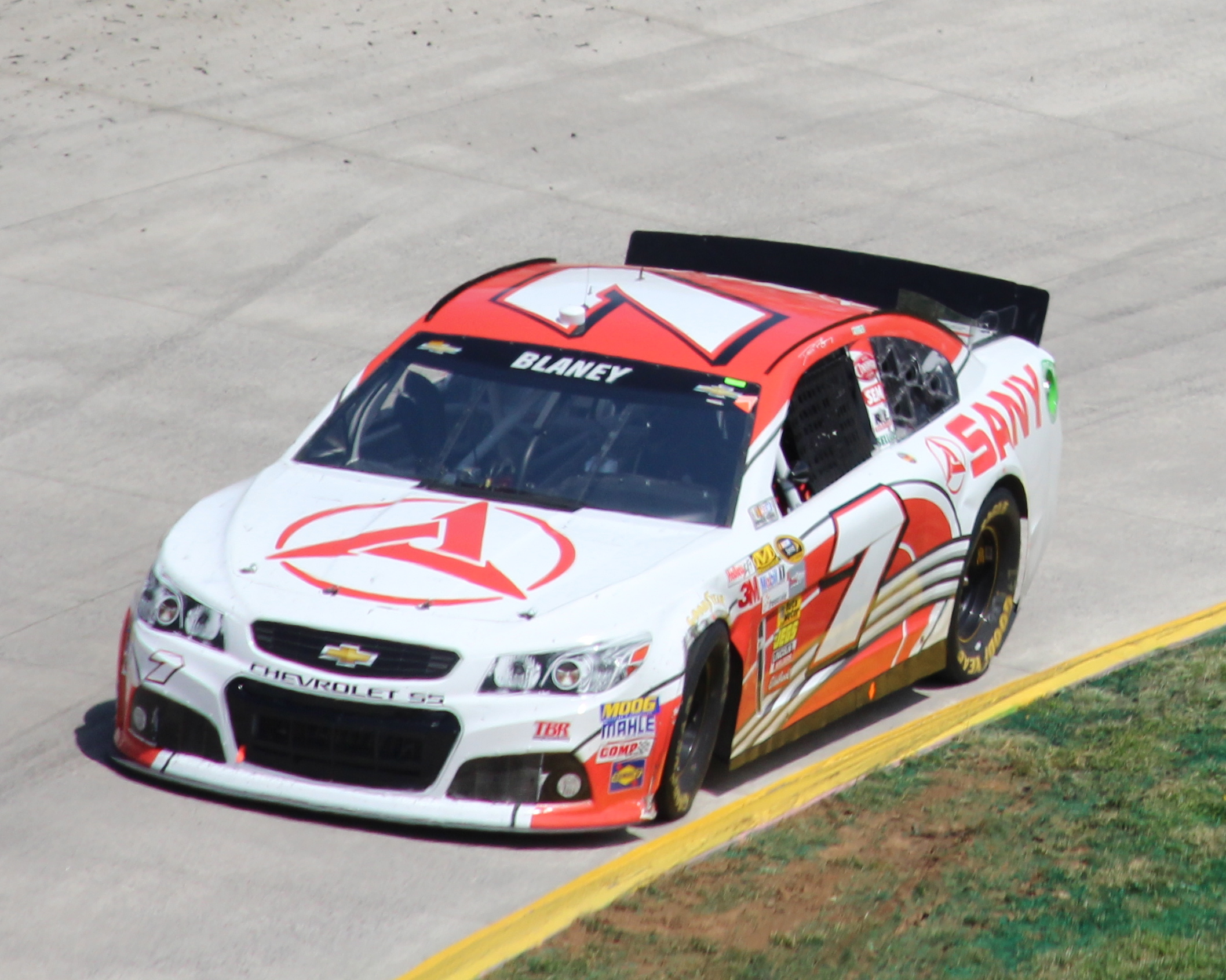
Blaney competing in the 2013 STP Gas Booster 500.

Blaney returned to Tommy Baldwin Racing for the 2013 NASCAR Sprint Cup Series season, moving to the new No. 7 Chevrolet; he also signed with Brad Keselowski Racing to drive their No. 19 in the Camping World Truck Series at the series' inaugural visit to Eldora Speedway, which he drove to a 9th-place finish. With Blaney's son Ryan's career having reached a level in which it no longer needed family funding, he went into semi-retirement after 2013. His last race with TBR was the season finale at Homestead. He was replaced at TBR by rookie Michael Annett. Blaney was credited with being a major part of building TBR into a legitimate Cup-level organization.

=== 2014: Semi-retirement ===
In January 2014, it was announced that Blaney would be driving the No. 77 Ford for Randy Humphrey Racing during several 2014 races. However, during practice for the Daytona 500, Blaney's car was caught up in a wreck. The team attempted to purchase a backup car from another team, but was unable to, and was forced to rescind their entry. The team was on the entry list for the Auto Club 400, but the team withdrew the Tuesday before the race. The team was again on the entry list for the STP 500 at Martinsville Speedway, but withdrew before practice. After failing to qualify in their first four races, the No. 77 team qualified for the first time in 2014 at the Duck Commander 500. At the season's midway point, Humphrey's team suspended operations. At the August race at Pocono, Blaney returned to TBR for the first time, driving a third car for the team he helped build. He finished 26th in the race. Blaney returned to the car at Michigan later in the month. Blaney also drove the following week at Bristol Motor Speedway, which turned out to be his final start.

== Motorsports career results ==
=== NASCAR ===
(key) (Bold – Pole position awarded by qualifying time. Italics – Pole position earned by points standings or practice time. * – Most laps led.)

==== Sprint Cup Series ====
NASCAR Sprint Cup Series results
Year	Team	No.	Make	1	2	3	4	5	6	7	8	9	10	11	12	13	14	15	16	17	18	19	20	21	22	23	24	25	26	27	28	29	30	31	32	33	34	35	36	NSCC	Pts	Ref
1992	Hover Motorsports	80	Pontiac	DAY	CAR	RCH	ATL	DAR	BRI	NWS	MAR	TAL	CLT	DOV	SON	POC	MCH	DAY	POC	TAL	GLN	MCH	BRI	DAR	RCH	DOV	MAR	NWS	CLT	CAR; 31	PHO	ATL; DNQ								79th	70	
1999	Bill Davis Racing	93	Pontiac	DAY	CAR	LVS	ATL	DAR	TEX	BRI	MAR	TAL	CAL	RCH	CLT	DOV	MCH; 33	POC	SON	DAY	NHA; 40	POC	IND; 28	GLN	MCH	BRI	DAR	RCH	NHA	DOV	MAR	CLT	TAL	CAR	PHO	HOM; 23	ATL; 37			51st	332	
2000	Bill Davis Racing	93	Pontiac	DAY; 27	CAR; DNQ	LVS; 22	ATL; 20	DAR; 26	BRI; 35	TEX; 22	MAR; 41	TAL; 30	CAL; 38	RCH; 34	CLT; 40	DOV; 25	MCH; 25	POC; 30	SON; 29	DAY; 24	NHA; 34	POC; 18	IND; 23	GLN; 35	MCH; 24	BRI; 43	DAR; 20	RCH; 18	NHA; 26	DOV; 39	MAR; 30	CLT; 28	TAL; 28	CAR; 42	PHO; 8	HOM; 9	ATL; 18			31st	2656	
2001	Bill Davis Racing	93	Dodge	DAY; 42	CAR; 9	LVS; 26	ATL; 34	DAR; 22	BRI; 29	TEX; 6	MAR; 29	TAL; 17	CAL; 29	RCH; 33	CLT; 33	DOV; 33	MCH; 8	POC; 11	SON; 32	DAY; 21	CHI; 12	NHA; 37	POC; 22	IND; 40	GLN; 28	MCH; 6	BRI; 18	DAR; 19	RCH; 26	DOV; 35	KAN; 10	CLT; 41	MAR; 29	TAL; 30	PHO; 28	CAR; 14	HOM; 6	ATL; 41	NHA; 11	22nd	3303	
2002	Jasper Motorsports	77	Ford	DAY; 25	CAR; 22	LVS; 18	ATL; 17	DAR; 30	BRI; 17	TEX; 15	MAR; 17	TAL; 31	CAL; 9	RCH; 29	CLT; 21	DOV; 29	POC; 10	MCH; 13	SON; 20	DAY; 28	CHI; 17	NHA; 35	POC; 22	IND; 15	GLN; 18	MCH; 18	BRI; 33	DAR; 29	RCH; 9	NHA; 25	DOV; 11	KAN; 21	TAL; 31	CLT; 10	MAR; 20	ATL; 19	CAR; 17	PHO; 7	HOM; 43	19th	3670	
2003	Jasper Motorsports	77	Ford	DAY; 24	**CAR**; 10	LVS; 34	ATL; 8	DAR; 3	BRI; 38	TEX; 36	TAL; 23	MAR; 31	CAL; 13	RCH; 18	CLT; 14	DOV; 20	POC; 26	MCH; 38	SON; 32	DAY; 35	CHI; 31	NHA; 13	POC; 9	IND; 28	GLN; 25	MCH; 25	BRI; 30	DAR; 30	RCH; 33	NHA; 14	DOV; 24		KAN; 43	CLT; 24	MAR; 37	ATL; 37	PHO; 24	CAR; 27	HOM; 28	28th	3194	
2003	Jasper Motorsports	77	Dodge																													TAL; 17								28th	3194	
2004	Bill Davis Racing	23	Dodge	DAY; 15	CAR	LVS	ATL; 11	DAR	BRI	TEX; 11	MAR	TAL; 39	CAL		CLT; 17	DOV; 33																								38th	1347	
2004	Ultra Motorsports	7	Dodge											RCH; 40																										38th	1347	
2004	Richard Childress Racing	30	Chevy														POC; 29	MCH; 15	SON	DAY; 15	CHI; 37	NHA; 33	POC; 27	IND; 21	GLN; 24	MCH	BRI	CAL	RCH	NHA	DOV	TAL	KAN							38th	1347	
2004	Roush Racing	99	Ford																															CLT; 37	MAR	ATL	PHO	DAR	HOM	38th	1347	
2005	Richard Childress Racing	07	Chevy	DAY; 14	CAL; 34	LVS; 13	ATL; 8	BRI; 20	MAR; 34	TEX; 26	PHO; 24	TAL; 19	DAR; 29	RCH; 27	CLT; 29	DOV; 36	POC; 24	MCH; 29	SON; 19	DAY; 27	CHI; 38	NHA; 20	POC; 20	IND; 30	GLN; 34	MCH; 32	BRI; 23	CAL; 22	RCH; 33	NHA; 33	DOV; 20	TAL; 15	KAN; 25	CLT; 13	MAR; 16	ATL; 24	TEX; 28	PHO; 25	HOM; 6	26th	3289	
2006	Bill Davis Racing	22	Dodge	DAY; 22	CAL; 30	LVS; 31	ATL; 32	BRI; 23	MAR; 17	TEX; 29	PHO; 27	TAL; 24	RCH; 20	DAR; 27	CLT; 32	DOV; 30	POC; 27	MCH; 30	SON; 39	DAY; 27	CHI; 17	NHA; 13	POC; 16	IND; 29	GLN; 40	MCH; 24	BRI; 14	CAL; 28	RCH; 4	NHA; 9	DOV; 12	KAN; 21	TAL; 28	CLT; 26	MAR; 33	ATL; 18	TEX; 32	PHO; 23	HOM; 26	27th	3255	
2007	Bill Davis Racing	22	Toyota	DAY; 34	CAL; 39	LVS; 42	ATL; 27	BRI; 23	MAR; 37	TEX; 21	PHO; 39	TAL; DNQ	RCH; 11	DAR; 32	CLT; 18	DOV; DNQ	POC; 43	MCH; 18	SON; 41	**NHA**; 29	DAY; 23	CHI; 40	IND; 9	POC; 20	GLN; 35	MCH; 6	BRI; 31	CAL; 38	RCH; 34	NHA; 35	DOV; DNQ	KAN; 15	TAL; 3	CLT; 6	MAR; 36	ATL; 38	TEX; 21	PHO; 31	HOM; 12	31st	2781	
2008	Bill Davis Racing	22	Toyota	DAY; 28	CAL; 30	LVS; 26	ATL; 34	BRI; 34	MAR; 43	TEX; 21	PHO; 30	TAL; DNQ	RCH; 18	DAR; 9	CLT; 17	DOV; 9	POC; 22	MCH; 39	SON; 20	NHA; 33	DAY; 19	CHI; 23	IND; 35	POC; 31	GLN; 41	MCH; 41	BRI; 38	CAL; 29	RCH; 22	NHA; 33	DOV; 12	KAN; 31	TAL; 22	CLT; 27	MAR; 22	ATL; 41	TEX; 29	PHO; 20	HOM; 22	30th	2851	
2009	Prism Motorsports	66	Toyota	DAY	CAL; 42	LVS; DNQ	ATL; 41	BRI; 43	MAR; 42	TEX; 43	PHO; 42	TAL	RCH; 43	DAR; 41	CLT; 28	DOV; 39	POC; 40	MCH; 40	SON; 42	NHA; 42	DAY; 43	CHI; 43	IND; 42	POC; 40	GLN; 42	MCH; 42	BRI; 43	ATL; 43	RCH; 43	NHA; 42	DOV; 37	KAN; 40	CAL; 41	CLT; DNQ	MAR; 40	TAL; 41	TEX; DNQ	PHO; 42	HOM; DNQ	41st	1204	
2010	Prism Motorsports	66	Toyota	DAY; DNQ	CAL; 41	LVS; 29	ATL; 41	BRI; 42	MAR; 42			TAL; 43	RCH; DNQ	DAR; 42	DOV; 41	CLT; 43	POC; 40	MCH; DNQ	SON; 37	NHA; 42	DAY; 43	CHI; DNQ	IND; 41	POC; 42	GLN; DNQ	MCH														37th	1416	
2010	Prism Motorsports	55	Toyota							PHO; 42	TEX; 43																													37th	1416	
2010	Tommy Baldwin Racing	36	Chevy																								BRI; DNQ		RCH; 30	NHA; 31	DOV; 43				MAR; 36	TAL; 42		PHO; 37		37th	1416	
2010	Front Row Motorsports	38	Ford																									ATL; 24				KAN; 31							HOM; 36	37th	1416	
2010	Front Row Motorsports	37	Ford																														CAL; 29	CLT; 32			TEX; 42			37th	1416	
2011	Tommy Baldwin Racing	36	Chevy	DAY; 26	PHO; 42	LVS; 34	BRI; 25	CAL; 37	MAR; 30	TEX; 30	TAL; 27	RCH; 13	DAR; 24	DOV; 26	CLT; 27	KAN; 32	POC; 26	MCH; 34	SON; 31	DAY; 39	KEN; 33	NHA; 29	IND; 31	POC; 30		MCH; 33	BRI; 35			CHI; 33	NHA; 35	DOV; 32	KAN; 31	CLT; 35	TAL; 3	MAR; 23				32nd	508	
2011	Tommy Baldwin Racing	35	Chevy																						GLN; DNQ				RCH; 19								TEX; 35	PHO; 27	HOM; 28	32nd	508	
2011	Germain Racing	60	Chevy																									ATL; 43												32nd	508	
2012	Tommy Baldwin Racing	36	Chevy	DAY; 15	PHO; 23	LVS; 29	BRI; 34	CAL; 33	MAR; 34	TEX; 37	KAN; 37	RCH; 29	TAL; 30	DAR; 27	CLT; 40	DOV; 32		MCH; 25	SON; 37	KEN; 35	DAY; 22	NHA; 39	IND; 23	POC	GLN; 36	MCH; 38	BRI; 26	ATL; 25	RCH; 33	CHI; 33			TAL; 29	CLT; 43	KAN; 39	MAR; 35	TEX; 39	PHO; 26	HOM; 32	33rd	417	
2012	Tommy Baldwin Racing	10	Chevy														POC; 25																							33rd	417	
2012	Penske Racing	22	Dodge																												NHA; QL^{†}									33rd	417	
2012	Max Q Motorsports	37	Chevy																													DOV; 41								33rd	417	
2013	Tommy Baldwin Racing	7	Chevy	DAY; 17	PHO; 33	LVS; 24	BRI; 36	CAL; 21	MAR; 29	TEX; 25	KAN; 43	RCH; 23	TAL; 16	DAR; 27	CLT; 30	DOV; 29	POC; 31	MCH; 31	SON	KEN; 40	DAY; 31	NHA; 23	IND; 38	POC; 23	GLN; 27	MCH; 30	BRI; 22	ATL; 26	RCH; 31	CHI; 23	NHA; 31	DOV; 33	KAN; 25	CLT; 32	TAL; 25	MAR; 39	TEX; 35	PHO; 30	HOM; 38	30th	526	
2014	Randy Humphrey Racing	77	Ford	DAY; Wth	PHO; DNQ	LVS; DNQ	BRI; DNQ	CAL	MAR	TEX; 41	DAR; 43	RCH; DNQ	TAL; DNQ	KAN; DNQ	CLT; DNQ	DOV; 33	POC; 43	MCH	SON	KEN	DAY	NHA	IND																	50th	46	
2014	Tommy Baldwin Racing	37	Chevy																					POC; 26	GLN	MCH; 33	BRI; 43	ATL	RCH	CHI	NHA	DOV	KAN	CLT	TAL	MAR	TEX	PHO	HOM	50th	46	
^{†} - Qualified for Sam Hornish Jr.

===== Daytona 500 =====
Year	Team	Manufacturer	Start	Finish
2000	Bill Davis Racing	Pontiac	31	27
2001	Bill Davis Racing	Dodge	20	42
2002	Jasper Motorsports	Ford	42	25
2003	Jasper Motorsports	Ford	39	24
2004	Bill Davis Racing	Dodge	23	15
2005	Richard Childress Racing	Chevrolet	38	14
2006	Bill Davis Racing	Dodge	34	22
2007	Bill Davis Racing	Toyota	37	34
2008	Bill Davis Racing	Toyota	34	38
2010	Prism Motorsports	Toyota	DNQ	
2011	Tommy Baldwin Racing	Chevrolet	42	26
2012	Tommy Baldwin Racing	Chevrolet	24	15
2013	Tommy Baldwin Racing	Chevrolet	30	17
2014	Randy Humphrey Racing	Ford	Wth	

==== Nationwide Series ====
NASCAR Nationwide Series results
Year	Team	No.	Make	1	2	3	4	5	6	7	8	9	10	11	12	13	14	15	16	17	18	19	20	21	22	23	24	25	26	27	28	29	30	31	32	33	34	35	NNSC	Pts	Ref
1998	Bill Davis Racing	93	Pontiac	DAY; 35	CAR; 42	LVS	NSV; 14	DAR; DNQ	BRI; 22	TEX; 34	HCY	TAL; 37	NHA	NZH	CLT; 43	DOV; 36	RCH; 23	PPR	GLN	MLW; 14	MYB	CAL	SBO	IRP; 33	MCH; DNQ	BRI; 29	DAR; 18	RCH; 12	DOV; 6	**CLT**; 11	GTY; 6	CAR; 20	ATL; 14	HOM; 6					29th	1915	
1999	Bill Davis Racing	93	Pontiac	DAY; 43	CAR; 11	LVS; 20	**ATL**; 2	DAR; 42	**TEX**; 8	NSV; 31	BRI; 24	TAL; 14	CAL; 28	NHA; 19	RCH; 10	NZH; 4	CLT; 19	DOV; 8	SBO	GLN; 8	MLW; 6	MYB; 13	**PPR**; 24	GTY; 8	IRP; 38	**MCH**; 3	BRI; 9	DAR; 2	RCH; 39	DOV; 24	CLT; 20	CAR; 3	MEM; 11	PHO; 19	HOM; 16				7th	3582	
2000	Bill Davis Racing	20	Pontiac	DAY	CAR	LVS	ATL	DAR	BRI	TEX; DNQ	NSV	TAL	CAL; 18	RCH; 22	NHA	**CLT**; 36	DOV; 8	SBO	MYB	GLN	MLW	NZH	PPR	GTY	IRP	MCH	BRI	DAR; 9	RCH; 21	DOV; 3	CLT; 3	CAR	MEM	PHO	HOM				46th	976	
2001	Team Goewey	93	Chevy	DAY	CAR	LVS	ATL	DAR	BRI	TEX	NSH	TAL	CAL	RCH	NHA	NZH	CLT; DNQ	DOV; 43	KEN	MLW	GLN	CHI	GTY	PPR	IRP	MCH	BRI	DAR	RCH	DOV	KAN	CLT	MEM	PHO	CAR	HOM			154th	0	
2002	Marsh Racing	31	Chevy	DAY	CAR	LVS	DAR	BRI	TEX	NSH	TAL	CAL	RCH	NHA	NZH	CLT	DOV	NSH	KEN	MLW	DAY	CHI	GTY	PPR	IRP	MCH	BRI	DAR	RCH	DOV	KAN	CLT	MEM	ATL	CAR	PHO	HOM; 35		114th	63	
2003	Marsh Racing	31	Chevy	DAY	CAR	LVS	DAR	BRI	TEX	TAL	NSH	CAL	RCH; 31	GTY	NZH																								43rd	1133	
2003	Marsh Racing	31	Ford													CLT; 11	DOV; 30	NSH	KEN	MLW	DAY	CHI; 13	NHA; 13	PPR	IRP	MCH; 10	BRI	DAR	RCH; 9	DOV	KAN	CLT; 18	MEM	ATL; 10	PHO	CAR	HOM; 16		43rd	1133	
2004	Marsh Racing	31	Ford	DAY	CAR	LVS; 33	DAR	BRI	TEX; 22	NSH	TAL	CAL	GTY	RCH; 21	NZH	CLT	DOV	NSH	KEN	MLW	DAY	CHI	NHA	PPR	IRP	MCH	BRI	CAL	RCH	DOV	KAN								60th	4979	
2004	FitzBradshaw Racing	82	Chevy																													CLT; 25		ATL	PHO; 42	DAR	HOM		60th	4979	
2004	FitzBradshaw Racing	14	Chevy																														MEM; 19						60th	4979	
2005	Marsh Racing	31	Chevy	DAY	CAL	MXC	LVS; 19	ATL	NSH	BRI	TEX	PHO	TAL	DAR	RCH; 42	CLT; 24	DOV; 12	NSH	KEN	MLW	DAY	CHI; 25	NHA; 35	PPR	GTY	IRP	GLN	MCH	BRI	CAL	RCH; 21	DOV	KAN; 20	CLT	MEM	TEX; 31	PHO	HOM; DNQ	56th	780	
2006	Braun Racing	32	Chevy	DAY	CAL	MXC	LVS	ATL	BRI	TEX	NSH	PHO	TAL	RCH	DAR	CLT; 15	DOV	NSH	KEN	MLW	DAY	CHI; 13	NHA; 15	MAR	GTY	IRP	GLN; 40	MCH	BRI	CAL	RCH; 7	DOV; 16	KAN	CLT; 1	MEM	TEX	PHO	HOM	47th	854	
2007	Braun Racing	32	Toyota	DAY; 2								PHO; 10																											22nd	2491	
2007	Braun Racing	10	Toyota		**CAL**; 10	MXC; 13	LVS; 25	ATL; 16	BRI; 30	NSH; 3	TEX; 25		TAL; 32	RCH; 16	DAR; 31	CLT; 11	DOV; 16	NSH; 17	KEN; 15	MLW	NHA; 35	DAY; 3	CHI; 9	GTY; 35	IRP	CGV	GLN	MCH	BRI	CAL	RCH	DOV; 23	KAN	CLT; 36	MEM	TEX	PHO	HOM; 26	22nd	2491	
2008	Braun Racing	10	Toyota	DAY	CAL	LVS	ATL	BRI	NSH	TEX	PHO	MXC	TAL	RCH	DAR	CLT	DOV	NSH	KEN	MLW	NHA	DAY	CHI	GTY	IRP	CGV	GLN	MCH	BRI	CAL	RCH	DOV	KAN	CLT; 17	MEM	TEX	PHO	HOM	115th	112	
2009	MSRP Motorsports	90	Chevy	DAY	CAL	LVS	BRI	TEX	NSH	PHO; 43	TAL	RCH	DAR	CLT	DOV	NSH	KEN	MLW	NHA	DAY	CHI	GTY	IRP	IOW															79th	357	
2009	MSRP Motorsports	91	Chevy																						GLN; 13	MCH	BRI	CGV	ATL; 43	RCH	DOV	KAN	CAL						79th	357	
2009	Braun Racing	87	Toyota																															CLT; 3	MEM	TEX	PHO	HOM	79th	357	

==== Camping World Truck Series ====
NASCAR Camping World Truck Series results
Year	Team	No.	Make	1	2	3	4	5	6	7	8	9	10	11	12	13	14	15	16	17	18	19	20	21	22	23	24	25	NCWTC	Pts	Ref
2004	Bill Davis Racing	23	Toyota	DAY	ATL	MAR	MFD	CLT	DOV; 6	TEX	MEM	MLW	KAN	KEN	GTW	MCH	IRP	NSH	BRI	RCH	NHA	LVS	CAL	TEX	MAR	PHO	DAR	HOM	74th	150	
2007	Bill Davis Racing	22	Toyota	DAY	CAL	ATL	MAR	KAN	CLT	MFD	DOV	TEX	MCH	MLW	MEM	KEN	IRP	NSH	BRI	GTW	NHA	LVS	TAL	MAR	ATL	TEX	PHO	HOM; 10	80th	139	
2013	Brad Keselowski Racing	19	Ford	DAY	MAR	ROC	KAN	CLT	DOV	TEX	KEN	IOW	ELD; 9	POC	MCH	BRI	MSP	IOW	CHI	LVS	TAL	MAR	TEX	PHO	HOM				95th	0^{1}	

^{*} Season still in progress
^{1} Ineligible for series points

=== Superstar Racing Experience ===
(key) * – Most laps led. ^{1} – Heat 1 winner. ^{2} – Heat 2 winner.

Superstar Racing Experience results
Year	No.	1	2	3	4	5	6	SRXC	Pts
2022	10	FIF	SBO	STA	NSV	I55	SHA; 12	19th	13

Sporting positions
Preceded by Steve Kinser	World of Outlaws Champion; 1995	Succeeded by Mark Kinser
