= Mercer Raceway Park =

Coordinates: 41°14′6″N 80°13′54″W

Mercer Raceway Park is a 3/8-mile (0.60 km) dirt oval located in Findley Township, Mercer County, just outside the northeast borough limits of Mercer, Pennsylvania. It is currently owned by Ed and Earl Michaels. In 2018 the speedway has played host to a few events. The remaining event will be the 19th Annual Little Guys Nationals, October 5th and 6th.

Today, Mercer Raceway Park is one of the region's top dirt tracks running Saturday nights beginning late March and continuing into early October. Regular racing divisions included the 410 Sprints, 358 Modifieds, Outlaw Sprint Warriors, Mod Lites, Stock Cars and Mini Stocks. Touring series that visit the track include the: UFO Late Models, Auto Racers for Kids Charities, All Star Sprint Circuit of Champions, All-American Sprint Nationals Pulling, BRP Modified Tour, and ARDC Sprint Midgets.

== Purchase and Management ==
Michelle and Earl Michaels Purchased the track from Edward Michaels in 2026. Edward Michaels purchased the track from Bill Altman in 2018. Bill Altman was the owner of the track, having purchased it from longtime owner and promoter Vicki Emig on April 30, 2010. Emig owned and operated the facility from 1999 through the start of 2010. Upon purchasing the track, Altman immediately increased the Sprint Car purse by over $1,000 to support the division.

== Location ==
Mercer Raceway Park is located at 555 Fairground Road in Mercer, PA.

== Western PA Sprint Championship ==
The event began in 1966 with a 100-lap endurance sprint race, seeing Ralph Quarterson as its first winner. Quarterson went on to win the next three events until the race was canceled in 1970. The Western PA Sprint Championship was revived in 1971 and remained a 100-lap event until 1977, where it was reduced to 50 laps.

The 1978 Western PA Sprint Championship was sanctioned by the World of Outlaws and was won by Johnny Beaber of Gibsonburg, OH. The race dropped to 40 laps in 1981 and was run once more in 1982 before a hiatus until 2004, during which the track was closed for nearly 11 years from 1982 - 1994.

As of 2010, there have been 21 races with 11 different winners: Ralph Quarterson (5), Bobby Allen (4), Johnny Beaber(2), Ed Lynch, Jr. (2), Brian Ellenberger (2), Kenny Weld (1), Jan Opperman (1), Buddy Cochran (1), Lynn Paxton (1), Lou Blaney (1), Carl Bowser (1).

== History ==
Mercer Raceway Park is the site of the former Mercer County Fair and is one of the oldest dirt tracks in the nation with horse racing dating back to the 19th century. Mercer ran its first auto race on July 26, 1951 (75 years ago).
