= Mitch Gibbs =

American Dirt Modified racing driver (born 1963)

- Born: Mitchell T. Gibbs; April 13, 1963 (age 63) Norwich, New York
- Retired: 2021
- Debut season: 1980

Modified racing career
- Years active: 1983-2021
- Car number: 2g, 7
- Championships: 14
- Wins: 179

Previous series
- 1981-1982 Wins 1980: Late model 10; Street stock

Championship titles
- 2005, 2006 Race of Champions Dirt Modified Tour

Mitch Gibbs (April 13, 1963) is a retired American Dirt Modified racing driver, credited with 179 career wins at 15 tracks in the Mid-Atlantic (United States).

== Racing career ==
Gibbs began his racing career in 1980 in a street stock at Brookfield Speedway in New York. The next year he took over his father's late model, and then moved to the modified class in 1983, winning the 320-track championship the next year at Fonda Speedway, New York . Gibbs claimed additional track championships at Afton Speedway, Five Mile Point Speedway in Kirkwood, Fulton Speedway, Thunder Mountain Speedway in Center Lisle, and Utica-Rome Speedway, all in New York.

Other New York venues where Gibbs competed successfully include. Brewerton Speedway, Canandaigua Speedway, Orange County Fair Speedway, Rolling Wheels Raceway in Elbridge, the Syracuse Mile, and the Weedsport Speedway. He also made appearances at Hagerstown Speedway, Maryland, and Penn Can Speedway in Susquehanna, Pennsylvania.

Gibbs was inducted into the New York State Stock Car Association Hall of Fame in 2024, and two years later into the Northeast Dirt Modified Hall of Fame.
