= Brian Weaver =

American Dirt Modified racing driver (born 1962)

- Born: November 25, 1962 (age 63) Conklin, New York
- Retired: 2017
- Debut season: 1982

Modified racing career
- Car number: 1a, 9r
- Championships: 15
- Wins: 152

Brian Weaver (November 24, 1962) is a retired American Dirt Modified racing driver, credited with 152 career wins at 11 tracks in the Mid-Atlantic Region of the United States.

== Racing career ==
Weaver is among the most successful drivers in the region, competing at venues like Pennsylvania's Big Diamond Speedway in Minersville, Selinsgrove Speedway, Susquehanna Speedway in York Haven, and Williams Grove Speedway in Mechanicsburg; Accord and Ransomville Speedways and the Syracuse Mile in New York; The Dirt Track at Charlotte North Carolina; Virginia Motor Speedway in Jamaica; and Brockville and Merrittville Speedways in Ontario, Canada.

Weaver has collected wins in New York, including Afton Park, Albany-Saratoga Speedway, Fulton Speedway, and Utica-Rome Speedway; Hagerstown Speedway, Maryland; and Bridgeport Speedway and New Egypt Speedway in New Jersey. He was a standout at the Penn Can Speedway in Susquehanna, Pennsylvania claiming 7 track titles, with 6 of these consecutive. Weaver also won six championships at Thunder Mountain Speedway in Center Lisle, New York, and two at Five Mile Point Speedway in Kirkwood, New York.
