= Chuck Akulis =

American Dirt Modified racing driver (born 1940)

- Born: Charles H. Akulis; January 6, 1940 (age 86)
- Retired: 2000
- Debut season: 1960

Modified racing career
- Car number: 3
- Championships: 28
- Wins: 200+

Charles Akulis (born January 6, 1940) is a retired American Dirt Modified racing driver. Akulis had a nine-year winning streak (1977–1985) at the Five Mile Point Speedway in Kirkwood, New York, and captured 14 track championships at the venue during his career.

== Racing career ==
Akulis' first time on a racetrack was a 1960 "greenhorn" event at Penn Can Speedway in Susquehanna, Pennsylvania. Competing with other beginners in a car borrowed from his brother-in-law, Akulis ended his race with a wreck. He went on to be a regular winner at Penn Can, competing at the speedway until 2000, and winning nine track championships

Akulis also competed at Nazareth Speedway in Pennsylvania, as well as at the renowned tracks of Central New York including Afton Motorsports Park, Brewerton Speedway, Canandaigua Speedway, Midstate Speedway in Morris, Rolling Wheels Raceway in Elbridge, and Weedsport Speedway. He was inducted into the Northeast Dirt Modified and the New York State Stock Car Association Halls of Fame.
