= Carl Nagel =

American Dirt Modified racing driver (born 1940)

- Born: January 8, 1940 (age 86) Susquehanna, Pennsylvania, U.S.
- Retired: 2013
- Debut season: 1965

Modified racing
- Car number: 7n
- Championships: 4
- Wins: 112+

Carl Nagel (born January 8, 1940) is an American retired Dirt Modified racing driver from Windsor, New York. His career spanned five decades competing in the Twin Tiers of Pennsylvania and New York.

== Racing career ==
Nagel found success at the Central New York racetracks such as Weedsport Speedway, but was most at home at the Five Mile Point Speedway (Kirkwood, New York), Penn Can Speedway (Susquehanna, Pennsylvania) and Thunder Mountain Speedway (Lisle, New York). Nagel scored 112 feature event wins and 4 track championships between the three venues.

In 2013, Nagel, along with son Mike Nagel and grandson Mike Nagel Jr. became the first three generation family to enter the same event at Five Mile Point, and grandson Mike Jr. became the first third generation feature winner at Penn Can. Carl Nagel was inducted into the Northeast Dirt Modified Hall of Fame in 2005.
