= Ken Schrader =

American racing driver (born 1955)

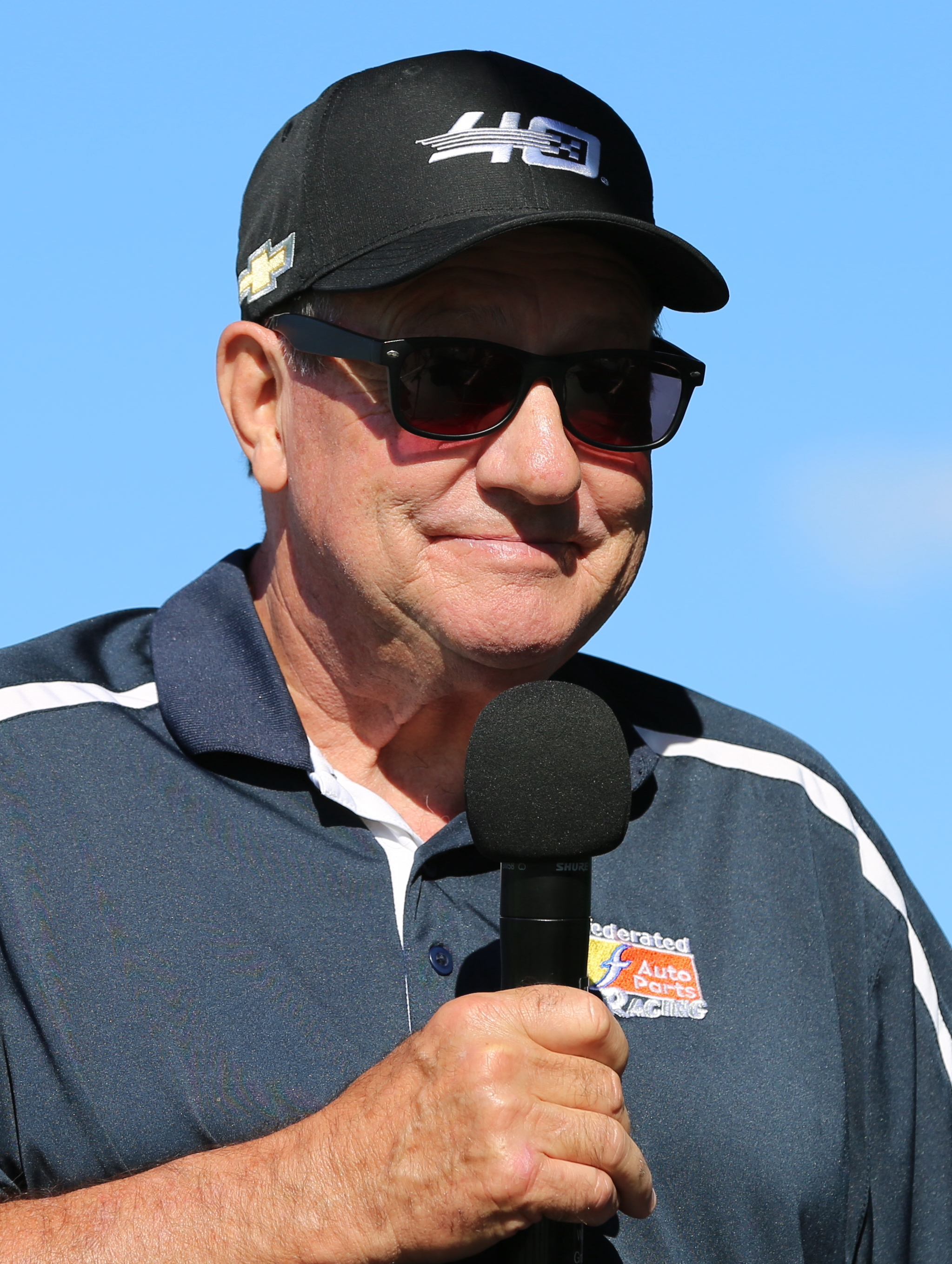
- Schrader at Las Vegas Motor Speedway in 2024
- Born: Kenneth William Schrader; May 29, 1955 (age 71); Fenton, Missouri, U.S.
- Achievements: 1982 USAC Silver Crown Series Champion; 1983 USAC Thunder & Lightning Sprint Car Series Champion; 1981 4-Crown Nationals Midget Winner; 1983 4-Crown Nationals Silver Crown Winner; 1989, 1990 Busch Clash Winner; 1981, 1982, 1984 Copper World Classic Midget Winner; 1989, 1990 Copper World Classic Silver Crown Winner; 1998 Copper World Classic Late Model Winner; 2006 Copper World Classic Stock Car Winner; 1988, 1989, 1990 Daytona 500 Pole Winner
- Awards: 1985 Winston Cup Series Rookie of the Year

NASCAR Cup Series career
- 763 races run over 29 years
- 2013 position: 39th
- Best finish: 4th (1994)
- First race: 1984 Pepsi 420 (Nashville)
- Last race: 2013 Ford EcoBoost 400 (Homestead)
- First win: 1988 Talladega DieHard 500 (Talladega)
- Last win: 1991 Budweiser 500 (Dover)
Wins	Top tens	Poles
4	184	23

NASCAR O'Reilly Auto Parts Series career
- 116 races run over 17 years
- 2010 position: 120th
- Best finish: 29th (1992)
- First race: 1987 AC-Delco 200 (Rockingham)
- Last race: 2010 Subway Jalapeño 250 (Daytona)
- First win: 1989 Ames/Peak 200 (Dover)
- Last win: 1994 Fram Filter 500K (Talladega)
Wins	Top tens	Poles
2	39	5

NASCAR FedEx Freight Truck Series career
- 105 races run over 18 years
- 2017 position: 58th
- Best finish: 19th (2007)
- First race: 1995 Skoal Bandit Copper World Classic (Phoenix)
- Last race: 2017 Eldora Dirt Derby (Eldora)
- First win: 1995 Scott Irvin Chevrolet/Craftsman 200 (Saugus)
Wins	Top tens	Poles
1	37	2

NASCAR Canada Series career
- 4 races run over 4 years
- Best finish: 40th (2022)
- First race: 2002 Canada Day Shootout (Hamilton)
- Last race: 2024 Freshstone Dirt Classic (Ohsweken)
- First win: 2023 Freshstone Dirt Classic (Ohsweken)
Wins	Top tens	Poles
1	4	1

ARCA Menards Series career
- 89 races run over 32 years
- Best finish: 15th (2014)
- First race: 1981 Daytona ARCA 200 (Daytona)
- Last race: 2023 Dutch Boy 100 (Springfield)
- First win: 1990 Massey Ford 150 (Hagerstown)
- Last win: 2015 Federated Car Care Fall Classic 200 (Salem)
Wins	Top tens	Poles
18	70	22
- Statistics up to date as of May 17, 2025.

Kenneth William Schrader (born May 29, 1955) is an American professional racing driver. He currently races on local dirt and asphalt tracks around the country. He also last competed part-time in the ARCA Menards Series, driving the No. 11 Ford for Fast Track Racing. He has also previously competed in the NASCAR Cup Series, the NASCAR Xfinity Series, and the NASCAR Camping World Truck Series, as well as the Superstar Racing Experience. He is a first cousin once removed of fellow NASCAR driver Carl Edwards.

Schrader races in many racing divisions and has been successful in any division he has stepped into. He owns a dirt late model and dirt open-wheel modified car. Both of these cars, along with his Camping World Truck Series and ARCA series cars, are sponsored by Federated Auto Parts. He owns Federated Auto Parts Raceway (formerly I-55 Raceway) in Pevely, Missouri, and is co-owner of Macon Speedway, near Macon, Illinois, along with Kenny Wallace, Tony Stewart, and local promoter Bob Sargent.

During the 1990s and the early part of the 2000s, Schrader was running as many as 100 races among many types of racing, including NASCAR's national and regional touring series, ARCA, short track, and dirt track.

== Racing career ==
=== Beginnings ===
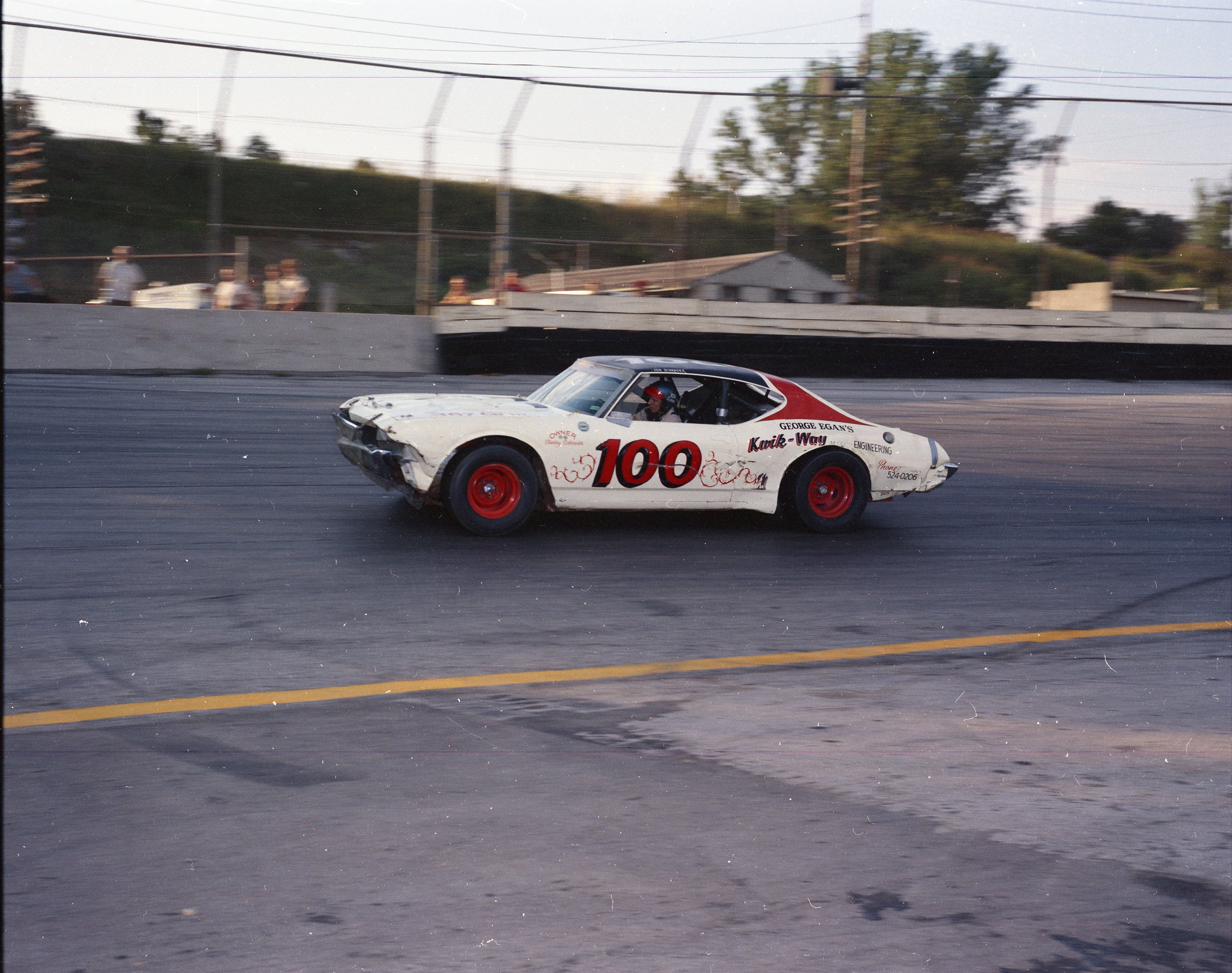
Schrader driving his sportman car in 1971 at Lake Hill Speedway

Schrader was born in Fenton, Missouri. In 1971, he was the sportsmens champ at Lake Hill Speedway in Valley Park. That same year, he moved up to sprint cars, racing in various locations across the Midwest. In 1980, he started racing in USAC's Stock Car Division and was the series' rookie of the year. He returned to USAC's Stock Car Division one year later, finishing third in points. Early in the decade, he moved to the USAC series, competing in its various sprint car competitions. Schrader attempted to qualify for the 1983 Indianapolis 500, but wrecked his car during practice. In the USAC series, he won four USAC sprint car races, six Silver Crown races, 21 in USAC midgets, and 24 midget races in other divisions.

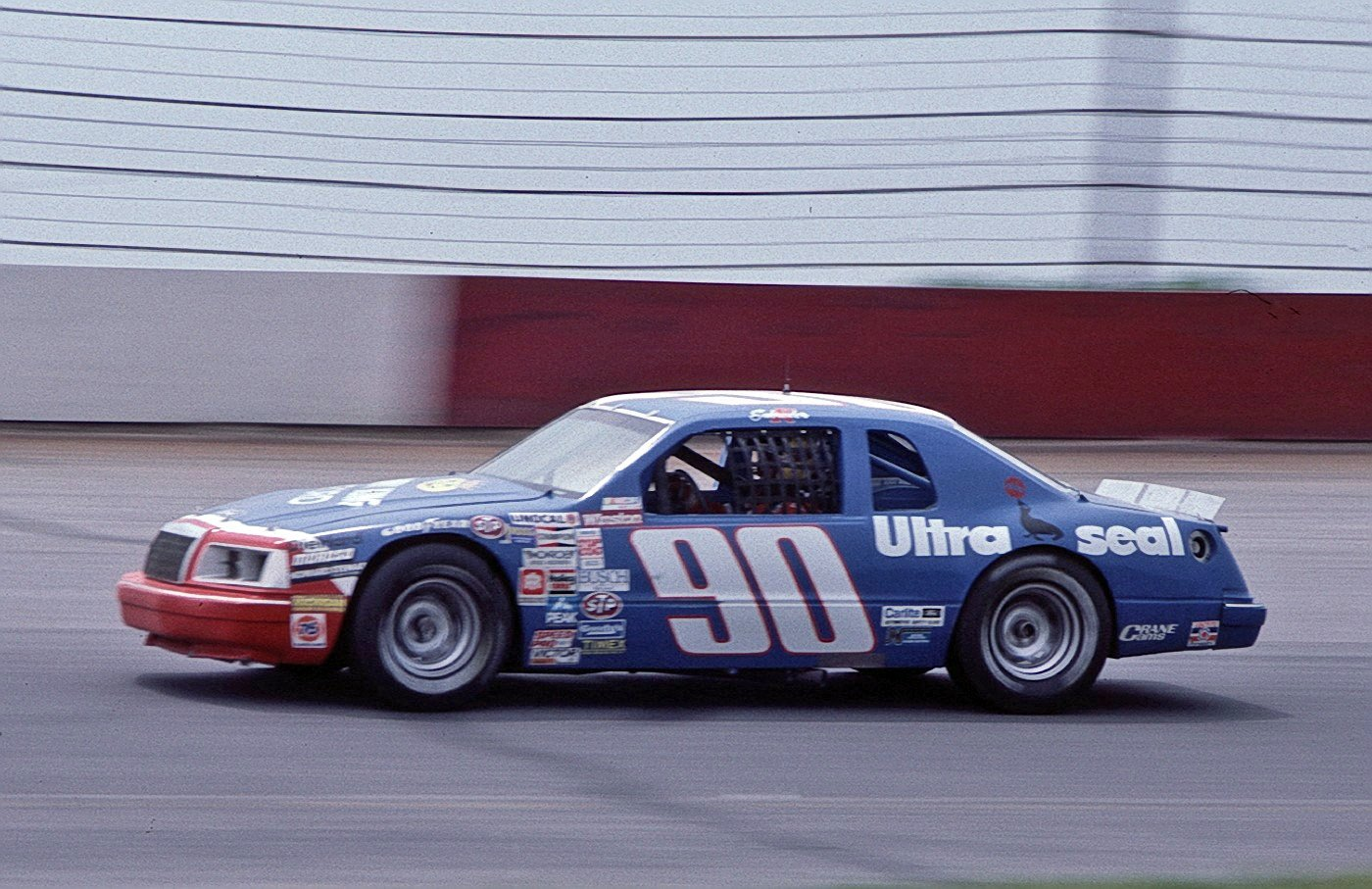
Schrader's 1985 Cup Series car

Schrader made his NASCAR debut in 1984 in the Winston Cup Series, leasing out the No. 64 Ford normally owned and driven by Elmo Langley. He ran his first race at Nashville, qualifying 27th and finishing nineteenth in a thirty-car field. He ran four more races out of the 64 that season, his best finish seventeenth at North Wilkesboro Speedway. In 1985, he signed to drive the No. 90 Ultra Seal-sponsored Ford for Junie Donlavey full-time. He had three tenth place finishes and finished sixteenth in points, winning rookie of the year honors. In 1986, Red Baron Frozen Pizza became the team's new primary sponsor, and Schrader had four top-tens, including a best finish of seventh twice, and finished 16th in the standings in points for the second consecutive season. In 1987, Schrader won his first career pole, at the TranSouth 500, where he led nineteen laps and finished fifth, notching his first top-five. He had nine other top-tens and finished tenth in the final standings. He also made his Busch Series debut, at North Carolina Speedway, finishing fifth in his own No. 45 Red Baron-sponsored Ford.

=== 1988–1996: Hendrick Motorsports ===
In 1988, Schrader moved over to the No. 25 Folgers sponsored Chevrolet for Hendrick Motorsports. Under the Hendrick Motorsports banner, the No. 25 Chevrolet listed Rick Hendrick's father, "Papa Joe" Hendrick, as the owner. In his first race, he won the pole for the Daytona 500, beginning a three-year streak in which he won the pole for that race. After initially failing to qualify in the No. 25 for the following race, Schrader purchased a racecar from Buddy Arrington to drive in the No. 67 Ford, this time successfully qualifying. Schrader won his first career race, at the Talladega DieHard 500, and finished fifth in the final standings. He won his second career Winston Cup Series race the following season at Charlotte Motor Speedway, and finished fifth in the standings again. He also earned his first career Busch Series win at the Ames/Peak 200.

Kodiak became Schrader's sponsor in 1990. Although he failed to win, he collected three poles, and seven top fives, dropping to tenth in points. He competed in the NASCAR Christmas 400 at the Calder Park Thunderdome in Australia, finishing second to Terry Labonte in the rain-shortened event. In 1991, he got his third win, at the Motorcraft Quality Parts 500, and his final Winston Cup Series win, at Dover International Speedway. He had nine total top-five finishes and finished ninth in the final points standings. In 1992, he dropped to seventeenth in the standings after posting eleven top-tens. The following season, Schrader returned to ninth in the points and won a career-high six poles. He had his career-best points finish in 1994 when he finished fourth. He also won his most recent Busch race at Talladega.

In 1995, Budweiser became Schrader's primary sponsor. Schrader lost the top end of his left thumb in a mishap at Evergreen Speedway in a NASCAR Supertrucks practice session on May 13. He won his final pole with Hendrick, at Pocono Raceway and dropped back to seventeenth in points. He survived a horrific crash in the DieHard 500 at Talladega Superspeedway. After he improved only to twelfth in the standings in 1996, Schrader left Hendrick Motorsports after a nine-year association with the team.

=== 1997–2005 ===
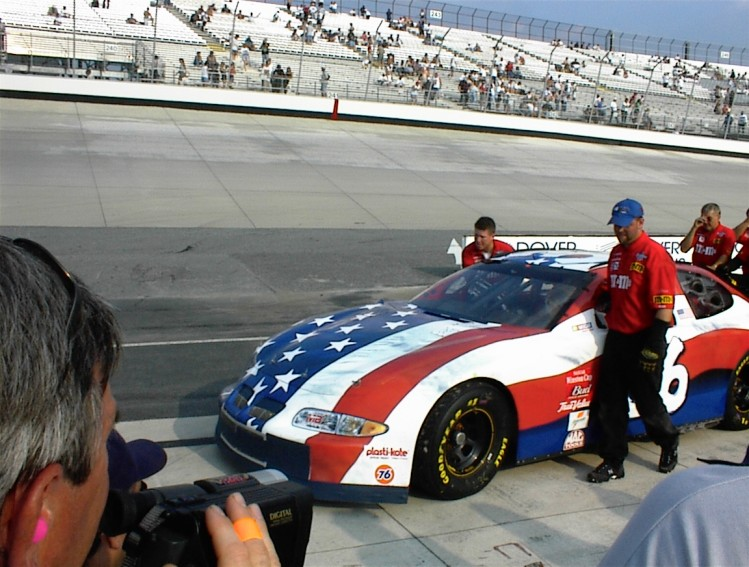
At Dover in September 2001, Schrader drove an all-American flag car in honor of those lost in the September 11 attacks two weeks prior.

In 1997, Schrader was hired to drive the No. 33 Skoal Bandit Chevrolet Monte Carlo for Andy Petree Racing. He had eight top-tens and won two poles, finishing tenth in the standings, his most recent top-ten points finish. The following season, he posted three fourth-place finishes and won two poles over the last five races of the season. He won his final Winston Cup Series pole, at Talladega, in 1999, but despite a fifteenth place points run, Schrader failed to finish in the top-five all year and departed Petree.

Schrader signed to drive the No. 36 M&M's Pontiac Grand Prix for MB2 Motorsports. In his first year of competition, Schrader had two top-tens and finished eighteenth in the standings. He posted five top-tens in 2001, but dropped to nineteenth in the standings. While competing in the Daytona 500, he was involved in a final-lap crash where Dale Earnhardt crashed into the wall and died. The image of Schrader peering into Earnhardt's car, only to jump back and frantically signal for assistance, is etched into the minds of many racing fans; his interview with Jeanne Zelasko during Fox Sports' post-race show was the first sign to many that something was wrong with the seven-time Winston Cup champion, as he appeared visibly shaken and upon being asked if Earnhardt was okay, he said "I don't really know. I'm not a doctor. I got the heck out of the way as soon as they got there." Schrader later stated in a 2011 interview that he knew Earnhardt was dead, but didn't want to be the one to announce it. In 2002, Schrader did not finish in the top-ten in a single race, the first time since 1984. Following that season, he departed MB2.

Despite an original lack of sponsorship, Schrader was announced as the driver of the No. 49 BAM Racing Dodge Intrepid for 2003. Soon, 1-800-Call-ATT became the team's primary sponsor. At the Brickyard 400, Schrader's qualifying time was too slow (and the team was out of provisionals) to make the field, the first time since 1984 that Schrader had missed a Winston Cup Series race. He DNQ'd three more times that season and fell to 36th in points. In 2004, Schrader's previous sponsor, Schwan Food Company, became BAM's new sponsor, while Schrader had a sixth-place finish at Bristol Motor Speedway. He had three more top-tens the following season and matched his previous year's run of 31st in points.

=== 2006–2007 ===
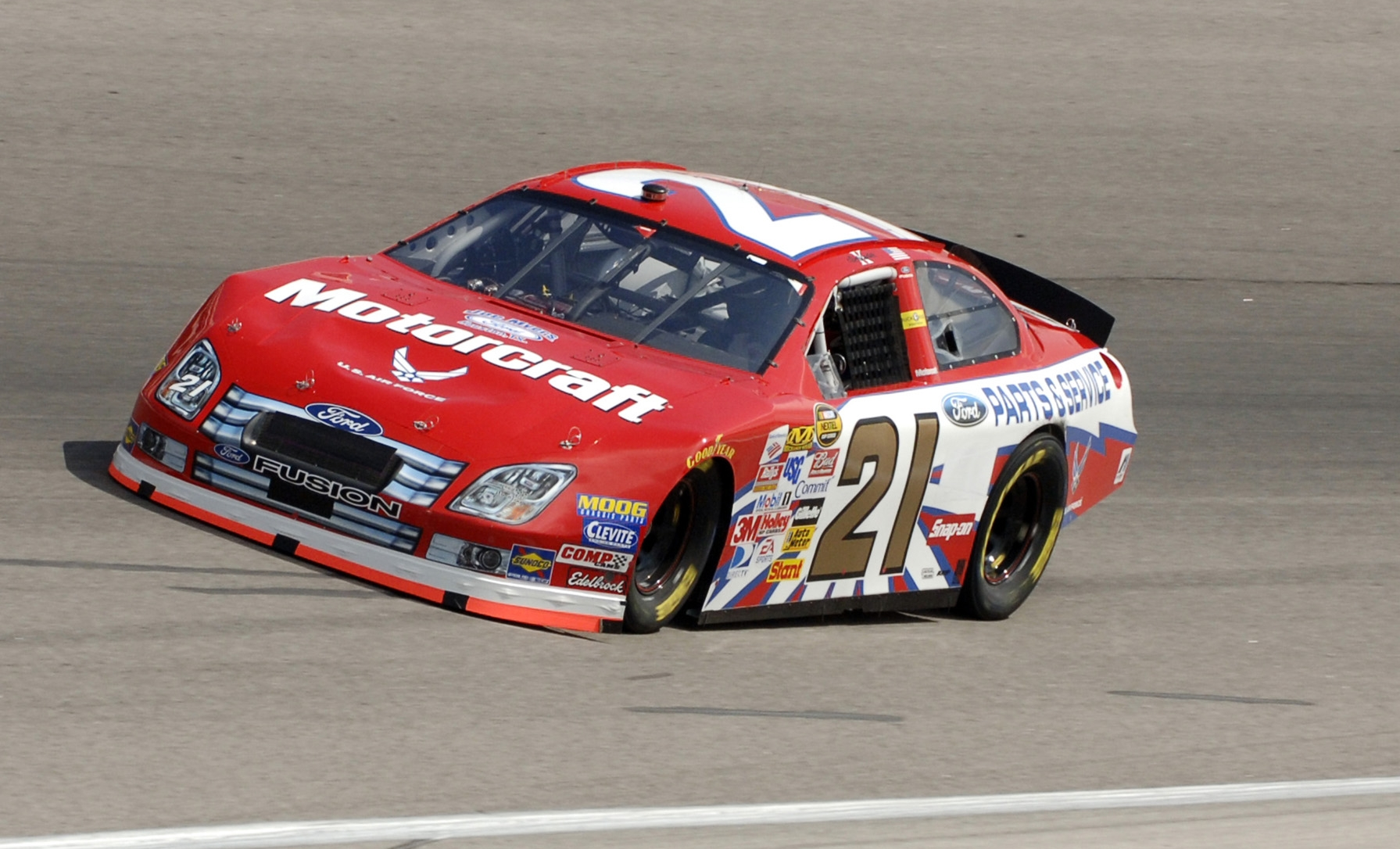
Schrader's 2006 NASCAR Nextel Cup Series car

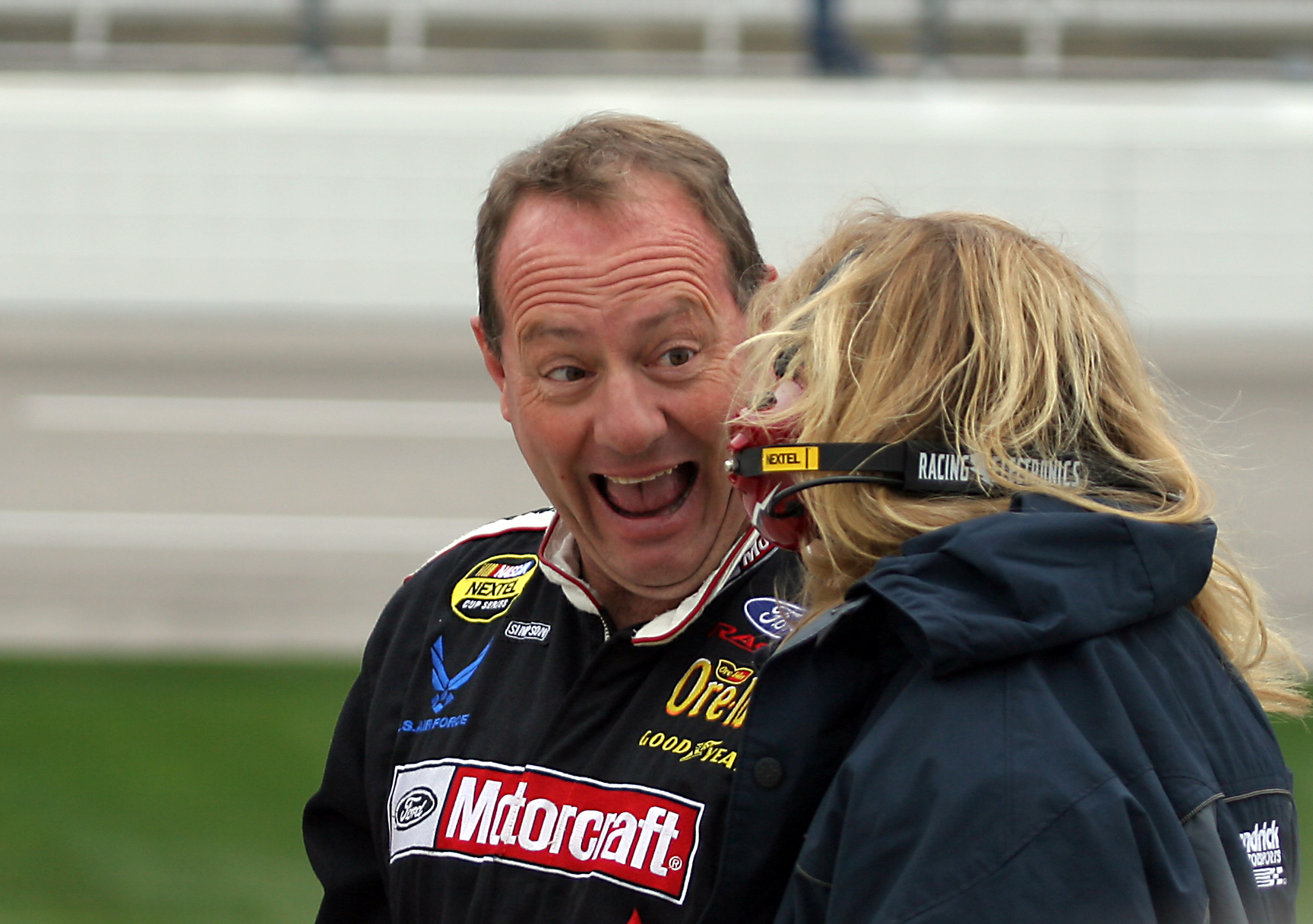
Schrader on pit road at Texas Motor Speedway in April 2007

In 2006, Schrader drove the No. 21 Little Debbie/Motorcraft/United States Air Force Ford for Wood Brothers Racing, earning his final two career top-tens that season. In 2007, he ran a part-time schedule with the Wood Brothers, sharing the ride with rookie Jon Wood. After the team fell out of the top-35 in owner's points, Bill Elliott became their new driver until the team returned to the top-35. Schrader returned to BAM Racing at Indianapolis, and later regained his spot with the Wood Brothers beginning at Loudon, before being replaced again by Elliott late in the year. Schrader also drove seventeen races in the Craftsman Truck Series for Bobby Hamilton Racing in the No. 18 Fastenal Dodge Ram, earning two top-five finishes.

=== 2008–2013 ===
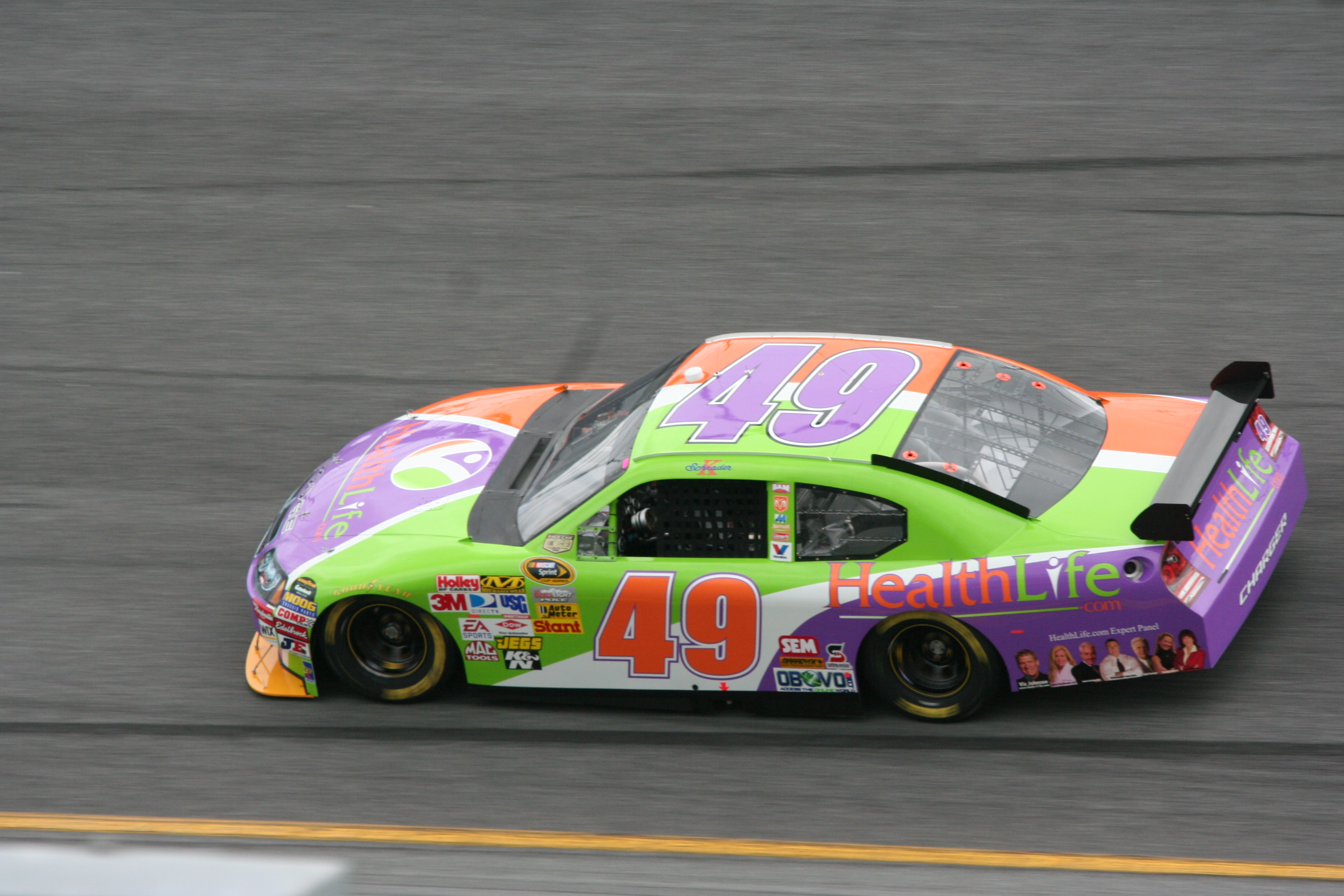
Schrader's 2008 Daytona 500 car

Schrader returned to BAM Racing in 2008. However, after making only two of the first five races, BAM Racing switched to Toyota. After the sixth race of the season, at Martinsville, Virginia, where Schrader qualified the new Microsoft Toyota in seventh place and finished 37th, BAM Racing decided they needed to sit the next two races out to complete a fleet of the new Toyota cars. After two weeks, it was announced that a primary sponsor had backed out of its deal, leaving BAM Racing and Schrader with no other option but to temporarily suspend operations. NASCAR.com reported on April 15, 2008, that the team would enter a hiatus, and not return to racing until the fall. Schrader ran the race in a one-off at Talladega on April 27, 2008, in the No. 70 Haas/CNC Chevrolet, sponsored by Hunt Brothers Pizza, qualifying third, but finishing 42nd due to motor problems.

Schrader qualified a fourth Richard Childress Racing entry into the Coca-Cola 600 on May 25. He qualified the No. 33 Camping World Chevy in the 33rd position and finished 33rd. Schrader signed a multi-race deal in August that allowed him to share a seat with Joey Logano for Jeff Moorad (Hall of Fame Racing) in the No. 96 DLP HDTV Toyota in various races through the end of the year. It was later announced that he would split the 2009 NASCAR Sprint Cup Series schedule in Phoenix Racing's No. 09 car alongside Brad Keselowski, Sterling Marlin, and Mike Bliss, but never made a race attempt. He made two starts in the truck series for himself, and seven starts in the ARCA series with six Top 10s in 2009.

Schrader started fourteenth and finished fourteenth in the Bud Shootout at Daytona International Speedway on February 6, 2010, driving the No. 82 Team Red Bull Toyota. That same year, he qualified for Martinsville marking his first NASCAR Sprint Cup Series points race since the November 2008 event at Phoenix International Raceway. Schrader finished eighteenth after starting 38th and leading seven laps for Latitude 43 Motorsports.

In 2011, Schrader ran a part-time Sprint Cup Series schedule for FAS Lane Racing. With seven starts, Schrader posted a season best finish of 21st at Martinsville during the fall race. He ran thirteen races for the team in the Sprint Cup Series in 2012. Schrader also inked a deal to run at least nine races in 2013 for FAS Lane Racing with Federated Auto Parts as the sponsor. Schrader ran in the truck series at the inaugural Mudsummer Classic at Eldora Speedway. In qualifying at Eldora, Schrader had a lap speed of 91.329 miles per hour (146.980 km/h), a track record, and clinched the pole, becoming the oldest pole winner in any NASCAR series at age 58. He eventually finished fourteenth.

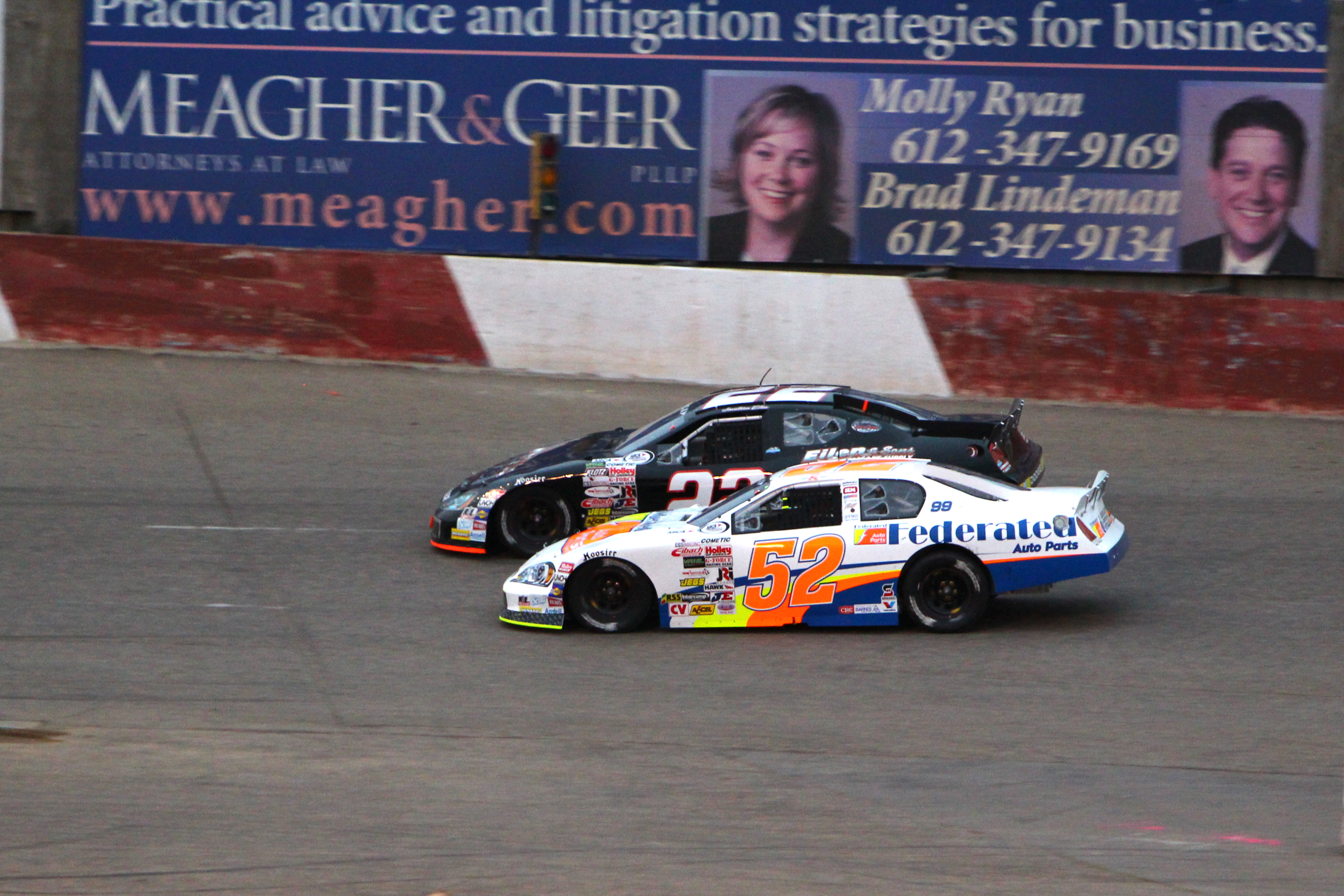
Schrader racing in his Ken Schrader Racing ARCA car at Elko Speedway in 2013

On May 21, 2013, he became the oldest ARCA race winner.

On October 27, 2013, Schrader announced that he would retire from NASCAR after the 2013 season; he described it as "not retirement", but that there were "just no plans to come back"; he planned to continue competing in ARCA and dirt modified events.

Despite his retirement, Schrader drove an entry in the 2014 Camping World Truck Series Mudsummer Classic at Eldora. While he was originally entered in Haas Racing Development's No. 00 truck, he instead drove his own No. 52 Federated Auto Parts truck. Schrader finished fourth; his best NASCAR finish in several years. In the 2015 running of the event, Schrader finished 11th after starting 3rd. In the 2016 race, now known as the Aspen Dental Eldora Dirt Derby, he drove the No. 71 Chevrolet to twelfth place finish.

On May 27, 2017, Schrader entered into the Little 500 sprint car race held at Anderson Speedway in Anderson, Indiana, where he finished tenth. In July, he returned to the Eldora Truck race, driving the No. 66 Silverado for Bolen Motorsports.

=== SRX ===
On May 4, 2022, Schrader was announced as a driver in the Superstar Racing Experience at the track he owned at the time, I-55 Speedway. Schrader won the first heat race of the night and finished ninth in heat 2. At the end of the main event, Schrader finished on the podium in third.

=== Pinty's Series ===
On August 14, 2023, Schrader won the Freshstone Dirt Classic at Ohsweken Speedway in the NASCAR Pinty's Series, becoming the first non-Canadian driver to win in the series and the oldest driver to win a NASCAR sanctioned event at the age of 68.

== Personal life ==
Schrader currently resides in Dittmer, Missouri, a small town about 45 minutes from downtown St. Louis, where he runs his race team, Schrader Racing. He is married to his wife, Ann, with whom he has two children.

Schrader was inducted into the St. Louis Sports Hall of Fame in 2024.

== Motorsports career results ==
=== NASCAR ===
(key) (Bold – Pole position awarded by qualifying time. Italics – Pole position earned by points standings or practice time. * – Most laps led.)

==== Sprint Cup Series ====
Sprint Cup Series results
Year	Team	No.	Make	1	2	3	4	5	6	7	8	9	10	11	12	13	14	15	16	17	18	19	20	21	22	23	24	25	26	27	28	29	30	31	32	33	34	35	36	NSCC	Pts	Ref
1984	Langley Racing	64	Ford	DAY	RCH	CAR	ATL	BRI	NWS	DAR	MAR	TAL	NSV	DOV	CLT	RSD	POC	MCH	DAY	NSV; 19	POC	TAL	MCH; 33	BRI	DAR	RCH	DOV	MAR	CLT; 26	NWS; 17	CAR	ATL; 27	RSD							53rd	-	
1985	Donlavey Racing	90	Ford	DAY; 11	RCH; 14	CAR; 40	ATL; 17	BRI; 10	DAR; 13	NWS; 14	MAR; 16	TAL; 20	DOV; 10	CLT; 38	RSD; 10	POC; 15	MCH; 34	DAY; 21	POC; 15	TAL; 11	MCH; 20	BRI; 19	DAR; 14	RCH; 15	DOV; 16	MAR; 26	NWS; 15	CLT; 25	CAR; 19	ATL; 15	RSD; 23									16th	3024	
1986	Donlavey Racing	90	Ford	DAY; 33	RCH; 23	CAR; 22	ATL; 21	BRI; 13	DAR; 10	NWS; 14	MAR; 7	TAL; 26	DOV; 10	CLT; 23	RSD; 17	POC; 27	MCH; 20	DAY; 12	POC; 23	TAL; 31	GLN; 16	MCH; 11	BRI; 28	DAR; 36	RCH; 25	DOV; 22	MAR; 7	NWS; 18	CLT; 28	CAR; 14	ATL; 17	RSD; 11								16th	3052	
1987	Donlavey Racing	90	Ford	DAY; 7	CAR; 10	RCH; 13	ATL; 29	**DAR**; 5	NWS; 16	BRI; 17	MAR; 7	TAL; 8	CLT; 29	DOV; 6	POC; 17	RSD; 10	MCH; 8	DAY; 7*	POC; 10	TAL; 18	GLN; 27	MCH; 34	BRI; 27	DAR; 11	RCH; 21	DOV; 11	MAR; 12	NWS; 15	CLT; 17	CAR; 14	RSD; 29	ATL; 35								10th	3405	
1988	Hendrick Motorsports	25	Chevy	**DAY**; 6	RCH; DNQ	CAR; 10	ATL; 8	**DAR**; 29	BRI; 10	NWS; 11	MAR; 10	TAL; 5	CLT; 6	DOV; 21	RSD; 20	POC; 9	MCH; 6	DAY; 8	POC; 2	TAL; 1	GLN; 10	MCH; 12	BRI; 21	DAR; 11	RCH; 18	DOV; 35	MAR; 4	CLT; 7	NWS; 8	CAR; 11	PHO; 14	ATL; 6								5th	3858	
1988	Arrington Racing	67	Ford		RCH; 20																																			5th	3858	
1989	Hendrick Motorsports	25	Chevy	**DAY**; 2*	CAR; 25	ATL; 15	RCH; 19	DAR; 27	BRI; 32	NWS; 14	MAR; 7	TAL; 6	CLT; 3	DOV; 3	SON; 37	POC; 4	**MCH**; 11	DAY; 36	**POC**; 7	TAL; 4	GLN; 20	MCH; 11	BRI; 23	DAR; 5	RCH; 24	DOV; 3	MAR; 10	CLT; 1	NWS; 13	CAR; 4	**PHO**; 13	ATL; 4								5th	3876	
1990	Hendrick Motorsports	25	Chevy	**DAY**; 40	RCH; 10	CAR; 3	ATL; 4	DAR; 10	BRI; 6	NWS; 19	MAR; 6	TAL; 28	**CLT**; 11	DOV; 2	SON; 18	POC; 15	MCH; 27	DAY; 3	POC; 11	TAL; 16	GLN; 9	MCH; 40	BRI; 12	DAR; 39	RCH; 10	DOV; 10	MAR; 27	NWS; 5	CLT; 35	**CAR**; 5	PHO; 2	ATL; 11								10th	3572	
1991	Hendrick Motorsports	25	Chevy	DAY; 31	RCH; 10	CAR; 2	ATL; 1	DAR; 19	BRI; 29	NWS; 5	MAR; 23	TAL; 7	CLT; 2	DOV; 1	SON; 5	POC; 7	MCH; 6	DAY; 4	POC; 23	TAL; 40	GLN; 30	MCH; 10	BRI; 3	DAR; 3	RCH; 8	DOV; 33	MAR; 9	NWS; 8	CLT; 38	CAR; 5	PHO; 17	ATL; 37								9th	3690	
1992	Hendrick Motorsports	25	Chevy	DAY; 37	CAR; 5	RCH; 14	ATL; 41	DAR; 12	BRI; 3	NWS; 22	MAR; 7	TAL; 23	CLT; 26	DOV; 23	SON; 9	**POC**; 4	MCH; 13	DAY; 6	POC; 12	TAL; 9	GLN; 21	MCH; 11	BRI; 3	DAR; 13	RCH; 9	DOV; 30	MAR; 13	NWS; 23	CLT; 7	CAR; 32	PHO; 6	ATL; 36								17th	3404	
1993	Hendrick Motorsports	25	Chevy	DAY; 8	CAR; 24	**RCH**; 20	ATL; 29	DAR; 4	BRI; 34	NWS; 3	MAR; 18	TAL; 21	SON; 4	**CLT**; 4	DOV; 5	**POC**; 2	MCH; 16	DAY; 3	NHA; 38	**POC**; 6	TAL; 32	GLN; 5	**MCH**; 27	BRI; 24	**DAR**; 9	RCH; 12	DOV; 2	MAR; 13	NWS; 10	CLT; 9	CAR; 8	PHO; 33	ATL; 27							9th	3715	
1994	Hendrick Motorsports	25	Chevy	DAY; 10	CAR; 9	RCH; 11	ATL; 16	DAR; 7	BRI; 2	NWS; 9	MAR; 31	TAL; 5	SON; 9	CLT; 24	DOV; 3	POC; 3	MCH; 6	DAY; 5	NHA; 24	POC; 39	TAL; 4	IND; 7	GLN; 4	MCH; 11	BRI; 19	DAR; 32*	RCH; 9	DOV; 4	MAR; 6	NWS; 14	CLT; 4	CAR; 32	PHO; 15	ATL; 11						4th	4060	
1995	Hendrick Motorsports	25	Chevy	DAY; 9	CAR; 39	RCH; 4	ATL; 27	DAR; 11	BRI; 26	NWS; 12	MAR; 6	TAL; 40	SON; 9	CLT; 30*	DOV; 11	**POC**; 3	MCH; 27	DAY; 6	NHA; 10	POC; 40	TAL; 32	IND; 19	GLN; 36	MCH; 26	BRI; 14	DAR; 23	RCH; 9	DOV; 12	MAR; 32	NWS; 8	CLT; 35	CAR; 33	PHO; 10	ATL; 42						17th	3221	
1996	Hendrick Motorsports	25	Chevy	DAY; 3	CAR; 29	RCH; 14	ATL; 6	DAR; 28	BRI; 29	NWS; 9	MAR; 7	TAL; 20	SON; 8	CLT; 5	DOV; 10	POC; 18	MCH; 16	DAY; 8	NHA; 8	POC; 15	TAL; 26	IND; 16	GLN; 25	MCH; 15	BRI; 13	DAR; 4	RCH; 13	DOV; 22	MAR; 30	NWS; 18	CLT; 29	CAR; 23	PHO; 35	ATL; 30						12th	3540	
1997	Andy Petree Racing	33	Chevy	DAY; 33	CAR; 18	RCH; 35	ATL; 25	DAR; 8	TEX; 18	BRI; 12	MAR; 10	SON; 31	TAL; 12	CLT; 38	DOV; 6	POC; 23	MCH; 27	CAL; 34	DAY; 15	**NHA**; 11	POC; 14	IND; 11	GLN; 14	MCH; 14	BRI; 6	DAR; 10	RCH; 14	**NHA**; 37	DOV; 12	MAR; 9	CLT; 15	TAL; 4	CAR; 30	PHO; 4	ATL; 20					10th	3576	
1998	Andy Petree Racing	33	Chevy	DAY; 4	CAR; 23	LVS; 21	ATL; 17	DAR; 18	BRI; 6	TEX; 21	MAR; 10	TAL; 29	CAL; 15	CLT; 10	DOV; 15	RCH; 4	MCH; 28	POC; 43	SON; 20	NHA; 9	POC; 8	IND; 10	GLN; 24	MCH; 14	BRI; 14	NHA; 42	DAR; 13	RCH; 4	DOV; 39	MAR; 13	CLT; 40	**TAL**; 24	DAY; 9	**PHO**; 22	CAR; 14	ATL; 7				12th	3675	
1999	Andy Petree Racing	33	Chevy	DAY; 6	CAR; 11	LVS; 18	ATL; 26	DAR; 43	TEX; 17	BRI; 20	MAR; 9	**TAL**; 6	CAL; 14	RCH; 14	CLT; 7	DOV; 41	MCH; 13	POC; 27	SON; 39	DAY; 20	NHA; 35	POC; 34	IND; 18	GLN; 17	MCH; 25	BRI; 10	DAR; 9	RCH; 21	NHA; 12	DOV; 26	MAR; 21	CLT; 23	TAL; 25	CAR; 30	PHO; 14	HOM; 29	ATL; 19			15th	3479	
2000	MB2 Motorsports	36	Pontiac	DAY; 9	CAR; 13	LVS; 16	ATL; 23	DAR; 22	BRI; 26	TEX; 18	MAR; 13	TAL; 36	CAL; 24	RCH; 12	CLT; 37	DOV; 23	MCH; 16	POC; 18	SON; 15	DAY; 23	NHA; 23	POC; 19	IND; 22	GLN; 18	MCH; 19	BRI; 12	DAR; 16	RCH; 17	NHA; 10	DOV; 30	MAR; 16	CLT; 25	TAL; 37	CAR; 18	PHO; 40	HOM; 32	ATL; 26			18th	3398	
2001	MB2 Motorsports	36	Pontiac	DAY; 13	CAR; 22	LVS; 25	ATL; 8	DAR; 13	BRI; 35	TEX; 10	MAR; 25	TAL; 40	CAL; 33	RCH; 9	CLT; 21	DOV; 36	MCH; 14	POC; 9	SON; 37	DAY; 15	CHI; 29	NHA; 22	POC; 17	IND; 28	GLN; 19	MCH; 20	BRI; 22	DAR; 10	RCH; 23	DOV; 18	KAN; 26	CLT; 14	MAR; 11	TAL; 31	PHO; 18	CAR; 19	HOM; 42	ATL; 31	NHA; 39	19th	3480	
2002	MB2 Motorsports	36	Pontiac	DAY; 26	CAR; 35	LVS; 26	ATL; 24	DAR; 35	BRI; 22	TEX; 34	MAR; 36	TAL; 24	CAL; 43	RCH; 15	CLT; 18	DOV; 36	POC; 16	MCH; 25	SON; 38	DAY; 25	CHI; 40	NHA; 24	POC; 20	IND; 14	GLN; 28	MCH; 14	BRI; 14	DAR; 26	RCH; 26	NHA; 13	DOV; 22	KAN; 28	TAL; 41	CLT; 31	MAR; 26	ATL; 42	CAR; 22	PHO; 37	HOM; 27	30th	2954	
2003	BAM Racing	49	Dodge	DAY; 42	CAR; 24	LVS; 28	ATL; 38	DAR; 17	BRI; 37	TEX; 24	TAL; 33	MAR; 10	CAL; 30	RCH; 24	CLT; 28	DOV; 26	POC; 43	MCH; 42	SON; 33	DAY; 41	CHI; 28	NHA; 36	POC; 26	IND; DNQ	GLN; DNQ	MCH; 8	BRI; 12	DAR; 38	RCH; 25	NHA; 37	DOV; 33	TAL; 21	KAN; 28	CLT; DNQ	MAR; 22	ATL; 26	PHO; 27	CAR; 36	HOM; DNQ	36th	2451	
2004	BAM Racing	49	Dodge	DAY; 40	CAR; 27	LVS; 32	ATL; 26	DAR; 22	BRI; 6	TEX; 19	MAR; 40	TAL; 23	CAL; 20	RCH; 23	CLT; 31	DOV; 34	POC; 25	MCH; 39	SON; 23	DAY; 35	CHI; 27	NHA; 37	POC; 21	IND; 18	GLN; 28	MCH; 28	BRI; 32	CAL; 33	RCH; 30	NHA; 16	DOV; 25	TAL; 20	KAN; 27	CLT; 21	MAR; 31	ATL; 23	PHO; 20	DAR; 30	HOM; 25	31st	3032	
2005	BAM Racing	49	Dodge	DAY; 39	CAL; 14	LVS; 34	ATL; 26	BRI; 23	MAR; 24	TEX; 23	PHO; 38	TAL; 8	DAR; 18	RCH; 30	CLT; 9	DOV; 37	POC; 20	MCH; 28	SON; 35	DAY; 10	CHI; 26	NHA; 26	POC; 31	IND; 22	GLN; 32	MCH; 25	BRI; 11	CAL; 29	RCH; 19	NHA; 40	DOV; 28	TAL; 26	KAN; 17	CLT; 34	MAR; 13	ATL; 34	TEX; 29	PHO; 30	HOM; 22	31st	3159	
2006	Wood Brothers/JTG Racing	21	Ford	DAY; 9	CAL; 28	LVS; 41	ATL; 24	BRI; 24	MAR; 40	TEX; 16	PHO; 16	TAL; 42	RCH; 16	DAR; 15	CLT; 26	DOV; 33	POC; 30	MCH; 42	SON; 41	DAY; 12	CHI; 42	NHA; 34	POC; 15	IND; 14	GLN; 34	MCH; 18	BRI; 13	CAL; 23	RCH; 7	NHA; 33	DOV; 19	KAN; 13	TAL; 25	CLT; 40	MAR; 41	ATL; 24	TEX; 42	PHO; 24	HOM; 29	31st	3049	
2007	Wood Brothers/JTG Racing	21	Ford	DAY; 35	CAL; 36		ATL; 37	BRI; 28	MAR; 19	TEX; 31	PHO; 28	TAL; DNQ	RCH; DNQ	DAR; 41	CLT	DOV	POC	MCH	SON	NHA	DAY	CHI								NHA; 30	DOV; 26	KAN; 32	TAL; 31	CLT	MAR	ATL	TEX	PHO	HOM	49th	932	
2007	Wood Brothers/JTG Racing	47	Ford			LVS; DNQ																																		49th	932	
2007	BAM Racing	49	Dodge																				IND; 25	POC	GLN	MCH	BRI	CAL	RCH											49th	932	
2008	BAM Racing	49	Dodge	DAY; DNQ	CAL; DNQ	LVS; 21	ATL; DNQ	BRI; 41																																43rd	1040	
2008	BAM Racing	49	Toyota						MAR; 37	TEX	PHO																													43rd	1040	
2008	Haas CNC Racing	70	Chevy									TAL; 42																												43rd	1040	
2008	Chip Ganassi Racing	40	Dodge										RCH; DNQ	DAR																										43rd	1040	
2008	Richard Childress Racing	33	Chevy												CLT; 33	DOV	POC	MCH	SON	NHA	DAY	CHI	IND	POC	GLN	MCH														43rd	1040	
2008	Hall of Fame Racing	96	Toyota																								BRI; 21	CAL; 41	RCH; 27	NHA	DOV; 33	KAN	TAL; 16	CLT; 38	MAR; 28	ATL; 35	TEX; 30	PHO; 27	HOM; DNQ	43rd	1040	
2010	Latitude 43 Motorsports	26	Ford	DAY	CAL	LVS	ATL	BRI	MAR	PHO	TEX	TAL	RCH	DAR	DOV	CLT	POC	MCH	SON	NHA	DAY	CHI	IND	POC	GLN	MCH	BRI	ATL	RCH	NHA	DOV	KAN	CAL	CLT	MAR; 18	TAL	TEX	PHO	HOM	65th	114	
2011	FAS Lane Racing	32	Ford	DAY	PHO	LVS	BRI; DNQ	CAL; 33	MAR; 22	TEX; 33	TAL	RCH; 32	DAR; 28	DOV	CLT	KAN	POC	MCH	SON	DAY	KEN	NHA	IND	POC	GLN	MCH; 30	BRI	ATL	RCH	CHI	NHA	DOV	KAN	CLT	TAL	MAR; 21	TEX	PHO	HOM	38th	110	
2012	FAS Lane Racing	32	Ford	DAY	PHO	LVS; 30	BRI; 33	CAL; 34	MAR; 32	TEX	KAN	RCH	TAL	DAR	CLT	DOV	POC	MCH; 31	SON	KEN; 31	DAY	NHA; 31	IND; 30	POC	GLN	MCH	BRI; 42	ATL	RCH; 35	CHI	NHA	DOV	TAL	CLT	KAN	MAR; 29	TEX; 31	PHO	HOM; 37	40th	146	
2013	FAS Lane Racing	32	Ford	DAY	PHO; 34	LVS; 37	BRI	CAL	MAR; 32	TEX	KAN	RCH	TAL	DAR	CLT	DOV	POC	MCH; 34	SON	KEN; 29	DAY	NHA; 30	IND	POC	GLN	MCH	BRI; 27	ATL	RCH; 37	CHI	NHA	DOV	KAN	CLT	TAL	MAR; 28	TEX	PHO	HOM; 34	39th	118	

===== Daytona 500 =====
Year	Team	Manufacturer	Start	Finish
1985	Donlavey Racing	Ford	24	11
1986	Donlavey Racing	Ford	41	33
1987	Donlavey Racing	Ford	3	7
1988	Hendrick Motorsports	Chevrolet	**1**	6
1989	Hendrick Motorsports	Chevrolet	**1**	2
1990	Hendrick Motorsports	Chevrolet	**1**	40
1991	Hendrick Motorsports	Chevrolet	24	31
1992	Hendrick Motorsports	Chevrolet	15	37
1993	Hendrick Motorsports	Chevrolet	7	8
1994	Hendrick Motorsports	Chevrolet	13	10
1995	Hendrick Motorsports	Chevrolet	9	9
1996	Hendrick Motorsports	Chevrolet	4	3
1997	Andy Petree Racing	Chevrolet	10	33
1998	Andy Petree Racing	Chevrolet	31	4
1999	Andy Petree Racing	Chevrolet	7	6
2000	MB2 Motorsports	Pontiac	23	9
2001	MB2 Motorsports	Pontiac	14	13
2002	MB2 Motorsports	Pontiac	7	26
2003	BAM Racing	Dodge	28	42
2004	BAM Racing	Dodge	37	40
2005	BAM Racing	Dodge	31	39
2006	Wood Brothers/JTG Racing	Ford	23	9
2007	Wood Brothers/JTG Racing	Ford	19	35
2008	BAM Racing	Dodge	DNQ	

==== Nationwide Series ====
NASCAR Nationwide Series results
Year	Team	No.	Make	1	2	3	4	5	6	7	8	9	10	11	12	13	14	15	16	17	18	19	20	21	22	23	24	25	26	27	28	29	30	31	32	33	34	35	NNSC	Pts	Ref
1987	Ken Schrader Racing	45	Ford	DAY	HCY	MAR	DAR	BRI	LGY	SBO	CLT	DOV	IRP	ROU	JFC	OXF	SBO	HCY	RAL	LGY	ROU	BRI	JFC	DAR	RCH	DOV	MAR	CLT; DNQ	CAR; 5	MAR									83rd		
1988	Ken Schrader Racing	52	Chevy	DAY; 42	HCY	CAR; 12	MAR	DAR; 15	BRI	LNG	NZH; 33	SBO	NSV	CLT; 17	DOV; 3	ROU	LAN	LVL	MYB	OXF	SBO	HCY	LNG	IRP	ROU	BRI	DAR; 39	RCH	DOV; 28	MAR	CLT; 4	CAR; 8	MAR						33rd	1050	
1989	Ken Schrader Racing	52	Chevy	DAY; 9	CAR; 14	MAR	HCY	DAR; 8	BRI	NZH; 6	SBO	LAN	NSV	CLT; 41	DOV; 8	ROU	LVL	VOL	MYB	SBO	HCY	DUB	IRP; 31	ROU	BRI			DOV; 1	MAR		CAR; 9	MAR							32nd	1108	
1989	Hendrick Motorsports	15	Chevy																							**DAR**; 35	RCH			CLT; 32									32nd	1108	
1990	Ken Schrader Racing	52	Chevy	DAY; 28	RCH	CAR; 36	MAR	HCY	DAR; 3	BRI	LAN	SBO	NZH; 31	HCY	CLT; 24	DOV	ROU	VOL	MYB	OXF	NHA; 40	SBO	DUB	IRP; 27	ROU	BRI	DAR; 31	RCH	DOV; 24	MAR	CLT; 10	NHA	CAR; 11	MAR					37th	1010	
1991	Ken Schrader Racing	15	Chevy	DAY; 4	RCH	CAR	MAR	VOL; 25	HCY; 4	DAR	BRI	LAN	SBO	NZH; 31	CLT; 28	DOV	ROU	HCY	MYB	GLN	OXF	NHA	SBO	DUB	IRP	ROU	BRI; DNQ	DAR; 10	RCH		CLT; 2	NHA; 40	CAR; 14	MAR					35th	1180	
1991	Darrell Waltrip Motorsports	17	Chevy																											DOV; 5									35th	1180	
1992	Ken Schrader Racing	15	Chevy	DAY; 9	CAR	RCH	ATL; 18	MAR	DAR					NZH; 20	CLT; 12	DOV	ROU	MYB	GLN	VOL	NHA	TAL; 8	IRP	ROU	MCH; 9	NHA; 5	BRI	DAR	RCH	DOV	CLT; 5	MAR	CAR; 9	HCY					29th	1296	
1992	Ernie Irvan Racing	4	Chevy							BRI; 24	HCY	LAN	DUB																										29th	1296	
1993	Ken Schrader Racing	52	Chevy	**DAY**; 2	CAR	RCH	DAR	BRI	HCY	ROU	MAR	NZH	CLT; 4	DOV; 32	MYB	GLN	MLW	TAL; 19	IRP	MCH; 8	NHA	BRI	DAR; 13	RCH	DOV	ROU	CLT; 20	MAR	CAR; 33	HCY	ATL; 11								35th	1066	
1994	Ken Schrader Racing	52	Chevy	DAY; 27	CAR	RCH	ATL; DNQ	MAR	DAR	HCY; 13	BRI; DNQ	ROU	NHA; 3	NZH	CLT; 26	DOV; 30	MYB	GLN	MLW; 23	SBO	TAL; 1	HCY	IRP	MCH; 15	BRI; 2	DAR	RCH	DOV	CLT; 42	MAR	CAR								38th	1128	
1995	Ken Schrader Racing	52	Chevy	DAY; 40	CAR	RCH	ATL; 2	NSV	DAR	BRI	HCY	NHA	NZH	CLT; 5	DOV; 26	MYB	GLN	MLW	TAL; 9	SBO	IRP	MCH; 9	BRI	DAR	RCH	DOV	CLT; 29	CAR; 15	HOM; 34										40th	984	
1998	Andy Petree Racing	15	Chevy	DAY	CAR	LVS	NSV	DAR	BRI	TEX	HCY	TAL	NHA	NZH	CLT	DOV	RCH; 38	PPR	GLN	MLW	MYB	CAL	SBO	IRP	MCH; 24	BRI; 6	DAR; 10	RCH; 43	DOV; 12	CLT; 38	GTY	CAR; 28	ATL; 10	HOM; 11					46th	977	
1999	Andy Petree Racing	15	Chevy	**DAY**; 38	CAR	LVS; 18	ATL; 38	DAR	TEX; 7	NSV	BRI; 14	**TAL**; 34	CAL	NHA	RCH; 6	NZH	CLT; 12	DOV	SBO	GLN	MLW	MYB	PPR	GTY; 12	IRP	MCH; 15	BRI	DAR	RCH; 37	DOV	CLT; DNQ	CAR; DNQ	MEM	**PHO**; 7	HOM				42nd	1270	
2000	Team Amick	88	Chevy	DAY	CAR	LVS	ATL	DAR	BRI	TEX	NSV	TAL	CAL	RCH	NHA	CLT	DOV	SBO	MYB	GLN	MLW	NZH	PPR	GTY; 43	IRP	MCH	BRI	DAR	RCH	DOV	CLT	CAR	MEM	PHO	HOM				117th	34	
2001	Ken Schrader Racing	07	Chevy	DAY	CAR	LVS	ATL	DAR	BRI	TEX	NSH	TAL	CAL	RCH	NHA	NZH	CLT	DOV	KEN	MLW	GLN	CHI	GTY	PPR	IRP	MCH	BRI	DAR	RCH	DOV	KAN	CLT	MEM	PHO; 39	CAR	HOM			139th	46	
2002	Ken Schrader Racing	07	Chevy	DAY	CAR	LVS; 39	DAR	BRI	TEX; 37	NSH	TAL	CAL	RCH	NHA	NZH	CLT	DOV	NSH	KEN	MLW	DAY	CHI	GTY	PPR	IRP	MCH	BRI	DAR	RCH	DOV	KAN	CLT	MEM	ATL	CAR	PHO	HOM		98th	98	
2005	Smith Brothers Motorsports	67	Chevy	DAY	CAL	MXC	LVS; DNQ	ATL	NSH	BRI	TEX	PHO	TAL	DAR	RCH	CLT	DOV	NSH	KEN	MLW	DAY	CHI	NHA	PPR	GTY	IRP	GLN	MCH	BRI	CAL	RCH	DOV	KAN	CLT	MEM	TEX	PHO	HOM	NA	-	
2006	Brewco Motorsports	66	Ford	DAY; 36	CAL	MXC	LVS; 17	ATL; 37	BRI; 37	TEX	NSH	PHO; 25	TAL; 22	RCH	DAR	CLT	DOV	NSH	KEN	MLW	DAY	CHI	NHA	MAR	GTY	IRP	GLN	MCH	BRI; 25	CAL	RCH	DOV; 15	KAN	CLT	MEM	TEX	PHO	HOM	59th	662	
2010	RAB Racing	09	Ford	DAY	CAL	LVS	BRI	NSH	PHO	TEX	TAL	RCH	DAR	DOV	CLT	NSH	KEN	ROA	NHA	DAY; 25	CHI	GTY	IRP	IOW	GLN	MCH	BRI	CGV	ATL	RCH	DOV	KAN	CAL	CLT	GTY	TEX	PHO	HOM	120th	88	

==== Craftsman Truck Series ====
NASCAR Camping World Truck Series results
Year	Team	No.	Make	1	2	3	4	5	6	7	8	9	10	11	12	13	14	15	16	17	18	19	20	21	22	23	24	25	26	NCWTC	Pts	Ref
1995	Ken Schrader Racing	52	Chevy	PHO; 3	TUS	SGS; 1	MMR	POR	EVG	I70	LVL	BRI	MLW	CNS	HPT	IRP	FLM	RCH; 5	MAR; 32	NWS; 14	SON	MMR; 35	PHO; 27							29th	828	
1996	Ken Schrader Racing	52	Chevy	HOM; 36	PHO	POR	EVG	TUS	CNS	HPT; 7	BRI	NZH; 13	MLW	LVL	I70	IRP	FLM	GLN	NSV	RCH	NHA	MAR	NWS	SON	MMR	PHO				46th	467	
1996	Darrell Waltrip Motorsports	17	Chevy																								LVS; 8			46th	467	
1997	Ken Schrader Racing	53	Chevy	WDW	TUS	HOM	PHO	POR	EVG	I70	NHA	TEX	BRI	NZH	MLW	LVL	CNS	HPT	IRP	FLM	NSV	GLN	RCH; 6	MAR	SON	MMR	CAL	PHO		69th	259	
1997	A. J. Foyt Racing	50	Ford																										LVS; 18	69th	259	
1999	Ken Schrader Racing	52	Chevy	HOM	PHO	EVG	MMR	MAR	MEM	PPR	I70	BRI	TEX	PIR	GLN	MLW	NSV	NZH	MCH	NHA	IRP	GTY	HPT	RCH	LVS	LVL	TEX	CAL; 36		120th	55	
2000	Ken Schrader Racing	52	Chevy	DAY	HOM	PHO	MMR	MAR; 12	PIR	GTY	MEM	PPR	EVG	TEX	KEN	GLN	MLW	NHA; 9*	NZH	MCH	IRP	NSV	CIC		DOV; 5	TEX	CAL; 17			35th	688	
2000	Ken Schrader Racing	52	Ford																					RCH; 7						35th	688	
2001	Ken Schrader Racing	52	Chevy	DAY	HOM	MMR	MAR; 29	GTY; 17	DAR; 2	PPR	DOV; 7	TEX	MEM	MLW; 8	KAN	KEN	NHA; 7	IRP	NSH	CIC	NZH	RCH; 12	SBO	TEX	LVS	PHO; 10	CAL			28th	1053	
2002	Ken Schrader Racing	52	Chevy	DAY	DAR; 10	MAR; 11	GTY	PPR	DOV; 33	TEX	MEM	MLW; 33	KAN	KEN	NHA; 33	MCH	IRP	NSH	RCH; 10	TEX	SBO	LVS	CAL	PHO; 7	HOM; 30					27th	809	
2003	Ken Schrader Racing	52	Chevy	DAY	DAR	MMR	MAR; 14	CLT; 11	DOV; 6	TEX	MEM	MLW; 21	KAN	KEN	GTY	MCH	IRP; 7	NSH	BRI; 13	RCH; 33	NHA; 11	CAL	LVS	SBO	TEX	MAR; 8	PHO; 17	HOM; 32		23rd	1286	
2004	Ken Schrader Racing	52	Chevy	DAY	ATL; 10	MAR; 36	MFD	CLT; 11	DOV; 5	TEX	MEM	MLW	KAN	KEN	GTY	MCH	IRP; 34	NSH	**BRI**; 10	RCH; 33	NHA; 12	LVS	CAL	TEX	MAR; 17	PHO; 12	DAR; 10	HOM; 33		28th	1297	
2005	Ken Schrader Racing	52	Chevy	DAY	CAL	ATL	MAR; 14	GTY	MFD	CLT; 36	DOV; 14	TEX						IRP; 35	NSH	BRI; 10	RCH; 15	NHA; 18	LVS	MAR; 11	ATL	TEX	PHO; 24	HOM		31st	1013	
2005	Darrell Waltrip Motorsports	11	Toyota										MCH; 29	MLW	KAN	KEN	MEM													31st	1013	
2007	Bobby Hamilton Racing	18	Dodge	DAY; 34	CAL; 15	ATL; 14	MAR; 12	KAN	CLT; 12	MFD; 3	DOV; 33	TEX; 8	MCH; 30	MLW; 18	MEM; 18	KEN; 17	IRP; 5	NSH; 22	BRI; 18	GTY; 17	NHA; 17	LVS	TAL	MAR	ATL	TEX	PHO	HOM		19th	1913	
2008	Ken Schrader Racing	52	Toyota	DAY	CAL	ATL	MAR; 4	KAN	CLT; 13	MFD	DOV	TEX	MCH	MLW	MEM	KEN	IRP	NSH	BRI; 33	GTY	NHA	LVS	TAL	MAR	ATL	TEX	PHO	HOM		51st	348	
2009	Ken Schrader Racing	52	Chevy	DAY	CAL	ATL	MAR; 10	KAN	CLT	DOV	TEX	MCH	MLW	MEM	KEN	IRP	NSH	BRI; 16	CHI	IOW	GTY	NHA	LVS	MAR	TAL	TEX	PHO	HOM		60th	249	
2010	Ken Schrader Racing	52	Chevy	DAY	ATL	MAR; 28	NSH												BRI; 24	CHI	KEN	NHA								25th	1060	
2010	Kevin Harvick Inc.	2	Chevy					KAN; 9	DOV	CLT	TEX; 5	MCH	IOW; 4	GTY	IRP	POC	NSH; 10	DAR; 10					LVS; 10	MAR	TAL; 14	TEX	PHO	HOM		25th	1060	
2013	Ken Schrader Racing	52	Toyota	DAY	MAR	CAR	KAN	CLT	DOV	TEX	KEN	IOW	**ELD**; 14	POC	MCH	BRI; 26	MSP	IOW	CHI	LVS	TAL	MAR	TEX	PHO	HOM					97th	0^{1}	
2014	Ken Schrader Racing	52	Toyota	DAY	MAR	KAN	CLT	DOV	TEX	GTY	KEN	IOW	ELD; 4	POC	MCH	BRI	MSP	CHI	NHA	LVS	TAL	MAR	TEX	PHO	HOM					56th	40	
2015	Ken Schrader Racing	52	Toyota	DAY	ATL	MAR	KAN	CLT	DOV	TEX	GTW	IOW	KEN	ELD; 11	POC	MCH	BRI	MSP	CHI	NHA	LVS	TAL	MAR	TEX	PHO	HOM				58th	33	
2016	Contreras Motorsports	71	Toyota	DAY	ATL	MAR	KAN	DOV	CLT	TEX	IOW	GTW	KEN	ELD; 12	POC	BRI	MCH	MSP	CHI	NHA	LVS	TAL	MAR	TEX	PHO	HOM				52nd	21	
2017	Bolen Motorsports	66	Chevy	DAY	ATL	MAR	KAN	CLT	DOV	TEX	GTW	IOW	KEN	ELD; 17	POC	MCH	BRI	MSP	CHI	NHA	LVS	TAL	MAR	TEX	PHO	HOM				58th	20	

==== Canada Series ====
NASCAR Canada Series results
Year	Team	No.	Make	1	2	3	4	5	6	7	8	9	10	11	12	13	14	Rank	Points	Ref
2022	Ed Hakonson Racing	3	Chevy	SUN	MSP	ACD	AVE	TOR	EDM	SAS	SAS	CTR	OSK; 8	ICAR	MSP	DEL		40th	36	
2023	22 Racing	22	Chevy	SUN	MSP	ACD	AVE	TOR	EDM	SAS	SAS	CTR	OSK; 1	OSK; QL^{†}	ICAR	MSP	DEL	46th	47	
2024	22 Racing	52	Chevy	MSP	ACD	AVE	RIS	RIS	OSK; 3	SAS	EIR	CTR	ICAR	MSP	DEL	AMS		47th	41	
^{†} - Qualified but replaced by Kyle Steckly.

* Season still in progress.

=== ARCA Menards Series ===
(key) (Bold – Pole position awarded by qualifying time. Italics – Pole position earned by points standings or practice time. * – Most laps led.)

ARCA Menards Series results
Year	Team	No.	Make	1	2	3	4	5	6	7	8	9	10	11	12	13	14	15	16	17	18	19	20	21	22	23	24	25	AMSC	Pts	Ref
1981	Harry Sieveking	68	Ford	DAY; 8	DSP	FRS	FRS	BFS	TAL	FRS	COR																		NA	0	
1982		68		NSV	DAY; DNQ	TAL	FRS	CMS	WIN	NSV	TAT	TAL	FRS	BFS	MIL	SND													NA	-	
1983	Darrell Simion	22		DAY	NSV	TAL	LPR	LPR	ISF	IRP	SSP	FRS	BFS	WIN	LPR	POC	TAL	MCS	FRS	MIL	DSF; DNQ	ZAN	SND						NA	-	
1984	Keith Simmons Racing	38	Ford	DAY	ATL	TAL	CSP	SMS	FRS	MCS	LCS	IRP	TAL	FRS	ISF; QL^{†}	DSF	TOL	MGR											NA	-	
1987	Jerry Gentile	26	Ford	DAY	ATL	TAL	DEL	ACS	TOL	ROC	POC	FRS	KIL	TAL	FRS	ISF; 34	INF	DSF	SLM	ATL									109th	-	
1990	Roulo Brothers Racing	6	Chevy	DAY	ATL	KIL	TAL	FRS	POC	KIL	TOL	**HAG**; 1*	POC	TAL	MCH	ISF	TOL	DSF	WIN	DEL	ATL								115th	-	
1991	Ken Schrader Racing	58	Chevy	DAY	ATL	KIL	TAL	TOL	FRS	POC	MCH	KIL	FRS	DEL	POC	TAL	**HPT**; 1*	MCH	ISF	TOL	DSF	TWS	ATL						142nd	-	
1992	Ken Schrader Racing	58	Chevy	DAY	FIF	TWS	TAL	TOL	KIL	POC	MCH	FRS	KIL	NSH	DEL	POC	**HPT**; 29	FRS	ISF	TOL	DSF	TWS	SLM	ATL					150th	-	
1993	Ken Schrader Racing	52	Chevy	DAY	FIF	TWS; 2	TAL	KIL	CMS	FRS	TOL	POC	MCH	FRS	POC	KIL													91st	-	
1993	Roulo Brothers Racing	93	Chevy														ISF; 35	DSF	TOL	SLM	WIN	ATL							91st	-	
1994	Ken Schrader Racing	52	Olds	DAY	TAL	FIF	LVL	KIL	TOL; 28	FRS	MCH	DMS	POC	POC	KIL	FRS	INF; 1	**I70**; 19	ISF	DSF	TOL	SLM	WIN	ATL					74th	395	
1995	Ken Schrader Racing	52	Olds	DAY	ATL	TAL	FIF	KIL	FRS	MCH	I80	MCS; 7*	FRS; 2	POC	POC	KIL	FRS	SBS	LVL	ISF	DSF	SLM	WIN	ATL					94th	-	
1996	Ken Schrader Racing	52	Chevy	DAY	ATL	SLM	TAL	FIF	LVL	CLT	CLT	KIL	FRS	POC	MCH	FRS	TOL	POC	MCH	INF; 28	SBS	ISF	DSF	KIL	SLM	WIN	CLT	ATL	153rd	-	
1997	Roulo Brothers Racing	39	Chevy	DAY	ATL	SLM	CLT	CLT	POC	MCH	SBS	**TOL**; 1*	KIL	FRS	MIN	POC	MCH	DSF	GTW	SLM	WIN	CLT	TAL						114th	-	
1997	Jim Coyle	1	Chevy																					**ISF**; 2	ATL				114th	-	
1998	Team Rensi Motorsports	38	Chevy	DAY	ATL	SLM	CLT	MEM	MCH	POC	SBS	TOL	PPR	POC	KIL	FRS	**ISF**; 1*	ATL	DSF	SLM	TEX	WIN	CLT	TAL	ATL				NA	0	
1999	Ken Schrader Racing	99	Chevy	DAY	ATL	SLM	AND; 1*	CLT	MCH	POC	TOL	SBS	BLN	POC	KIL	FRS	FLM	ISF	WIN; 18	DSF	SLM; 1*	CLT	TAL	ATL					49th	615	
2000	Ken Schrader Racing	99	Chevy	DAY	SLM	AND; 4	CLT	KIL	FRS	MCH	POC	TOL	KEN	BLN	POC	WIN	ISF	KEN	DSF	SLM; 3	CLT	TAL	ATL						57th	435	
2001	Ken Schrader Racing	99	Chevy	DAY	NSH; 1	WIN	SLM	GTY	KEN	CLT	KAN	MCH	POC	MEM	GLN	KEN	MCH	POC	NSH	ISF	CHI		SLM; 3	TOL	BLN	CLT	TAL	ATL	54th	655	
2001	Ken Schrader Racing	99	Pontiac																			DSF; 4							54th	655	
2002	Ken Schrader Racing	99	Pontiac	DAY	ATL	NSH	SLM	KEN	CLT	KAN	POC	MCH	TOL	**SBO**; 1*	KEN	BLN	POC	NSH	ISF	WIN	DSF; 3	CHI	SLM	TAL	CLT				61st	485	
2003	Ken Schrader Racing	99	Pontiac	DAY	ATL	NSH	SLM	**TOL**; 28*	KEN	CLT	BLN	KAN	MCH	LER	POC	POC	NSH	ISF	WIN	DSF; 2	CHI	SLM	TAL	CLT	**SBO**; 1*				50th	615	
2004	Ken Schrader Racing	99	Chevy	DAY	NSH; 5	SLM	KEN									GTW; 23	POC	LER	NSH	ISF	TOL								24th	1050	
2004	Ken Schrader Racing	99	Pontiac					**TOL**; 1*	CLT	KAN												**DSF**; 8	CHI	SLM	TAL				24th	1050	
2004	BAM Racing	69	Dodge								POC; 2	MCH	SBO	BLN	KEN														24th	1050	
2005	Ken Schrader Racing	99	Chevy	DAY	NSH	SLM; 22	KEN	TOL; 1	LAN	MIL	POC	MCH	KAN	KEN	BLN	POC	**GTW**; 3	LER	NSH				DSF; 34	CHI	SLM	TAL			41st	865	
2005	Ken Schrader Racing	99	Dodge																	MCH; 3	ISF	TOL							41st	865	
2006	Ken Schrader Racing	99	Chevy	DAY	NSH	SLM; 2	WIN	KEN	TOL; 1	POC	MCH	KAN	KEN	BLN	POC	GTW	NSH	MCH	ISF	MIL	TOL	**DSF**; 1*	CHI	SLM	TAL	IOW			55th	705	
2007	Ken Schrader Racing	52	Chevy	DAY	USA	NSH	SLM; 5	KAN	WIN	KEN	TOL; 2	IOW	POC	MCH	BLN	KEN	POC	NSH				DSF; 1*	CHI	SLM	TAL	TOL			39th	865	
2007	Hendren Motorsports	66	Ford																ISF; 8	MIL	GTW								39th	865	
2008	Ken Schrader Racing	52	Dodge	DAY	**SLM**; 2*	IOW	KAN	CAR; 2	KEN	TOL; 9	POC	MCH	CAY	KEN	BLN	POC	NSH	ISF						TOL; 24					28th	1245	
2008	Ken Schrader Racing	52	Chevy																DSF; 3	CHI	SLM	NJE	TAL						28th	1245	
2009	Ken Schrader Racing	52	Dodge	DAY	SLM; 5				TOL; 15	POC	MCH	MFD	IOW	KEN	BLN	POC													22nd	1650	
2009	Ken Schrader Racing	52	Chevy			**CAR**; 7*	TAL	KEN									ISF; 7	CHI	TOL; 5	DSF; 5	NJE	SLM	KAN	CAR; 4					22nd	1650	
2010	Ken Schrader Racing	52	Chevy	DAY	PBE	SLM	TEX	TAL	TOL; 6	POC	MCH	IOW	MFD	POC	BLN	NJE	ISF	CHI	DSF; 5	TOL	SLM	KAN	CAR						54th	430	
2013	Ken Schrader Racing	52	Chevy	DAY	MOB	SLM	TAL	TOL; 1*	**ELK**; 5	POC	MCH	ROA	WIN	CHI	NJE	POC	BLN	ISF	MAD	**DSF**; 1*	IOW	SLM; 4	KEN	KAN					29th	930	
2014	Ken Schrader Racing	52	Chevy	DAY	MOB	SLM; 8	TAL	TOL; 4	NJE	POC	MCH; 11	ELK; 5	**WIN**; 4	CHI	IRP; 7	POC	BLN; 9	ISF; 8	MAD	DSF; 6	**SLM**; 5	KEN	KAN						15th	2000	
2015	Ken Schrader Racing	52	Chevy	DAY	MOB	NSH	SLM; 1*	TAL						WIN; 13	IOW					DSF; 5	**SLM**; 2	KEN	KAN						24th	1180	
2015	Ken Schrader Racing	52	Toyota						TOL; 13	NJE	POC	MCH	CHI			IRP; 11	POC	BLN	ISF										24th	1180	
2016	Cunningham Motorsports	22	Ford	DAY	NSH	SLM	TAL	TOL	NJE	POC	MCH	MAD	WIN	IOW	IRP	POC	BLN	ISF; 4											54th	430	
2016	Venturini Motorsports	55	Toyota																DSF; 3	SLM	CHI	KEN	KAN						54th	430	
2018	Ken Schrader Racing	52	Ford	DAY	NSH	SLM	TAL	TOL	CLT	POC	MCH	MAD	GTW; 11	CHI	IOW	ELK	POC	ISF	BLN	DSF	SLM	IRP	KAN						83rd	175	
2019	Ken Schrader Racing	52	Toyota	DAY	FIF	SLM	TAL	NSH	TOL	CLT	POC	MCH	MAD	GTW	CHI	ELK	IOW	POC	ISF	**DSF**; 8	SLM	IRP	KAN						61st	200	
2021	Fast Track Racing	10	Toyota	DAY	PHO	TAL	KAN	TOL	CLT	MOH	POC	ELK	BLN	IOW	WIN	GLN	MCH	ISF	MLW	DSF; 3	BRI								49th	75	
2021	Fast Track Racing	12	Toyota																			SLM; 10	KAN						49th	75	
2022	Fast Track Racing	11	Ford	DAY	PHO	TAL	KAN	CLT	IOW	BLN	ELK	MOH	POC	IRP	MCH	GLN	ISF; 9	MLW	DSF; 16	KAN	BRI	SLM	TOL						53rd	63	
2023	Fast Track Racing	10	Toyota	DAY	PHO	TAL	KAN	CLT	BLN	ELK	MOH	IOW	POC	MCH	IRP	GLN	ISF; 6	MLW	DSF	KAN	BRI	SLM	TOL						76th	38	
^{†} - Qualified for Jim Jeffrey

^{*} Season still in progress
^{1} Ineligible for series points

=== International Race of Champions ===
(key) (Bold – Pole position. * – Most laps led.)

International Race of Champions results
Year	Make	1	2	3	4	Pos.	Points	Ref
1995	Dodge	DAY; 3	DAR; 3	TAL; 7	MCH; 8	6th	43	
2002	Pontiac	DAY	CAL	CHI	**IND**; 3	NA	0	

=== Superstar Racing Experience ===
(key) * – Most laps led. ^{1} – Heat 1 winner. ^{2} – Heat 2 winner.

Superstar Racing Experience results
Year	No.	1	2	3	4	5	6	SRXC	Pts
2022	52	FIF	SBO	STA	NSV	I55; 3^{1}	SHA	14th	36
2023	52	STA; 7	STA II; 4	MMS; 12	BER; 6	ELD; 8	LOS; 3	5th	150

=== USAC Championship Car results ===
(key) (Races in bold indicate pole position)

Year	Team	1	2	3	4	5	6	Rank	Points
1981-82	Rose Brothers Trucking	INDY	POC	ILL; 16	DUQ; 11	ISF	INDY	**NR**	**0**
1982-83	Rose Brothers Trucking	SPR; 8	DUQ; 12		INDY; DNQ			**10th**	**360**
1982-83	Ben's Tire Clinic			NAZ; 4				**10th**	**360**
1983-84	Rose Brothers Trucking	DUQ; 3	INDY					**10th**	**280**

==== Indianapolis 500 ====
Year	Chassis	Engine	Start	Finish
1983	March 83C	Cosworth DFX	Practice crash	

Achievements
Preceded by Dale Earnhardt	Busch Clash Winner; 1989, 1990	Succeeded by Dale Earnhardt
Awards
Preceded by Rusty Wallace	NASCAR Winston Cup Series Rookie of the Year; 1985	Succeeded by Alan Kulwicki
