= Hagerstown Speedway =

Auto-racing track in Maryland, US

Coordinates: 39.6607°N 77.8440°W

The Capital of Dirt Track Racing
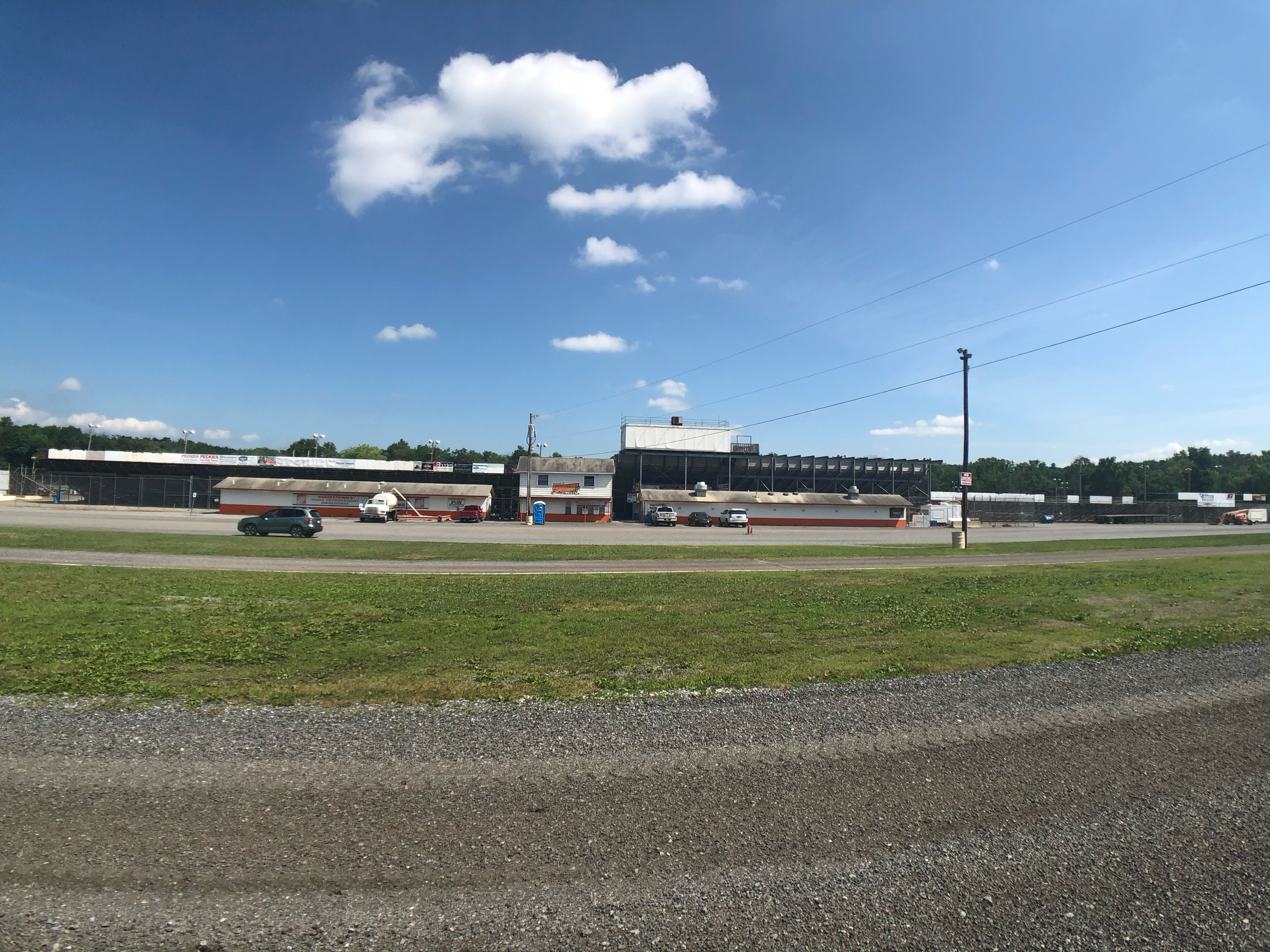
- Outside of Hagerstown Speedway
- Location: 15112 National Pike, Hagerstown, Maryland 21740
- Owner: Frank Plessinger
- Broke ground: 1946
- Opened: August 1948
- Architect: Stanley Schetrompf
- Former names: Conococheague Speedway Hagerstown Motor Speedway
- Major events: Lucas Oil Late Model Dirt Series; Pennsylvania Sprint Speedweek
- Website: https://hagerstownspeedway.com

Half Mile Dirt Oval
- Surface: Red Clay
- Length: 0.50 mi (0.8 km)
- Race lap record: 14:945 (Mark Kinser, Mark Kinser, 1999, 410 Sprint Car)

Quarter Midget Track
- Length: 0.113 km (0.070 mi)

Hagerstown Speedway is a 0.5-mile-long (0.80 km) red clay oval auto-racing track located 6 miles (9.7 km) west of Hagerstown, Maryland, on US Route 40. It hosts weekly local racing of Late Model Sportsman, Pure Stock, and Hobby Stock divisions, and throughout the season hosts regional and national touring series such as the Lucas Oil Late Model Series, International Motor Contest Association, and FASTRAK. Along with the car-racing schedule during the year, Monster Jam has used the track for events for several decades, along with various concerts and special events. The speedway has also hosted World of Outlaws, ARCA, and NASCAR races in the past.

== History ==
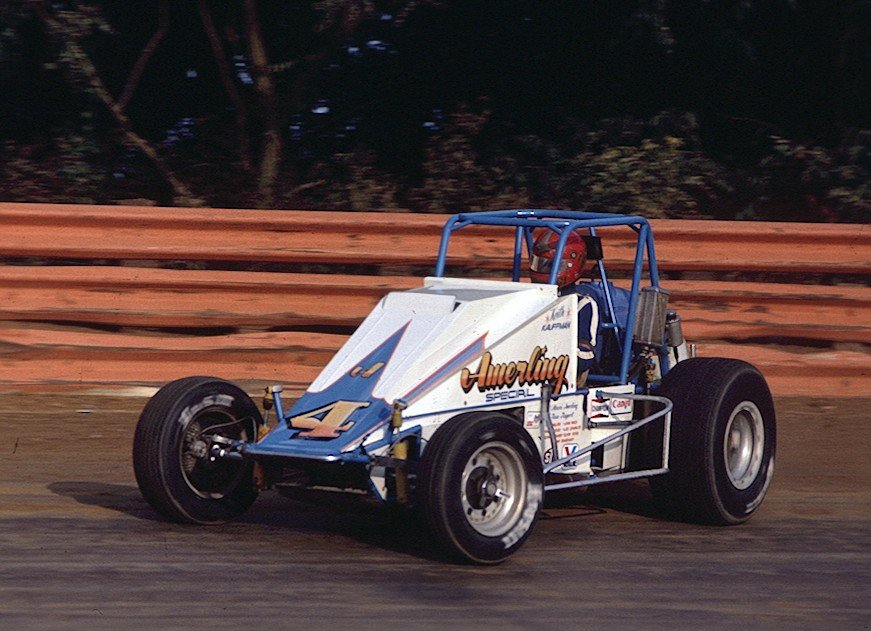
Keith Kauffman at Hagerstown in 1986

The Hagerstown Speedway was built in 1946 by Stanley Schetrompf at the former Conococheague Amusement Park between the banks of the Conococheague Creek and US Route 40 at a cost of $60,000 ($658,907 in 2019) with the seating of 3000 people. Stanley Schetrompf signed a working agreement with the owner of Williams Grove Speedway Roy Richwine. It finally hosted its first event on August 29, 1948, after being postponed twice due to weather. Legendary NASCAR-driver Curtis Turner won the first feature at the track in what was a 30 lap (15 mile) stock car race with an over 8 second lead in a Ford in a 20 car field. After the 1949 season they changed the name from Conococheague Speedway to its current name Hagerstown Speedway. In 1962 a group of friends (Wayne Stouffer, Woody Pool and Durham Lewis) purchased the race track to hold AMA Motorcycle races with the support of their DC Ramblers Motorcycle Club located in Indian Head, Maryland. Over the years the track would hold annual National AMA Flat Track races while expanding into dirt late model and sprint car races. Wayne Stouffer took over sole ownership from the group in 1972 and led the transformation of the historic track to becoming one of the premier half mile banked dirt tracks on the east coast. In 1981 Frank Plessinger took ownership of the track and has since transformed it into a modern circuit. Plessinger has claimed that it is the finest dirt track in the United States. Throughout the years, many NASCAR drivers have raced and found dirt-racing success there, including Cale Yarborough, Ken Schrader and Jeff Gordon. Schrader scored the victory in the 1990 Hagerstown ARCA 150 ARCA event at the track. In July 2020, NASCAR and open-wheel superstar Kyle Larson dominated the annual PA Sprint Speedweek 30-lap feature at the Maryland track en-route to the prestigious Speedweek points title.

It has 20 metal grandstand sections, two of which bear the last names of the founders Schetrompf and Stouffer. In the 1980s, a 1/10 mile Quarter Midget track was built behind turn 2. In October 2013, track-owner Plessinger appointed his daughter Lisa Plessinger to become the promoter of the track. In 2018, the Super Late Model category championship would not be handed out due to low car count; it was the first year in the track history for that to happen. For the 2020 season, and for the first time ever in the track's history, a sanctioning-body would take over sanctioning duties for the speedway, that sanctioning-body being FASTRAK, owners of the ULTIMATE Super Late Model Series. However, the excitement of a new racing year would suddenly have to be put on hold as the COVID-19 pandemic outbreak in March 2020 would shut the speedway down and postpone the start of the 2020 racing season to late-May due to the restrictions set in stone by the State of Maryland refusing social gatherings of more than 250 people. They were able to fit a couple races but after the PA Speedweek event they had problem with fans not following protocol and attacking track officials they called off the rest of the 2020 season.

The most successful driver in the history of the track as of 2020 is National Dirt Late Model Hall of Fame member Gary Stuhler, who owns over 100 Super Late Model victories at the speedway.

As is the case with most auto-racing tracks, Hagerstown has had its share of driver fatalities. However, thanks to the advancements and innovations in safety-gear over the past several decades, the last reported driver-fatality as of December 2020 was in 1969, when Frank Gorinchky died after being involved in a multiple-car accident.

== 1996 Late Model Crash ==
During a 30-lap race in 1996, the Late Model racer Jack Bland crashed on the backstretch of the track. When another driver (number 81) tried to overtake after turn two, Jack attempted to block them but hit the guardrail, which broke his car apart and thrust it into the air. His car flipped and was hit by another racer (number 70) at high speed. He had to be rescued from the vehicle using the Jaws of Life but only sustained a broken leg. It has been called the worst crash in dirt Late Model history. The crash was featured on Discovery Channel show Destroyed in Seconds.

== Events ==
=== Current ===
- Lucas Oil Late Model Series (2009-Current)
- ULTIMATE Northeast Late Model Series
- FASTRAK Crate Late Models
- Mid Atlantic Modifieds
- IMCA RaceSaver Sprint Series
- Monster Jam
- Pennsylvania Sprint Speedweek
- USAC Regional and National (Midget Track)

=== Past ===
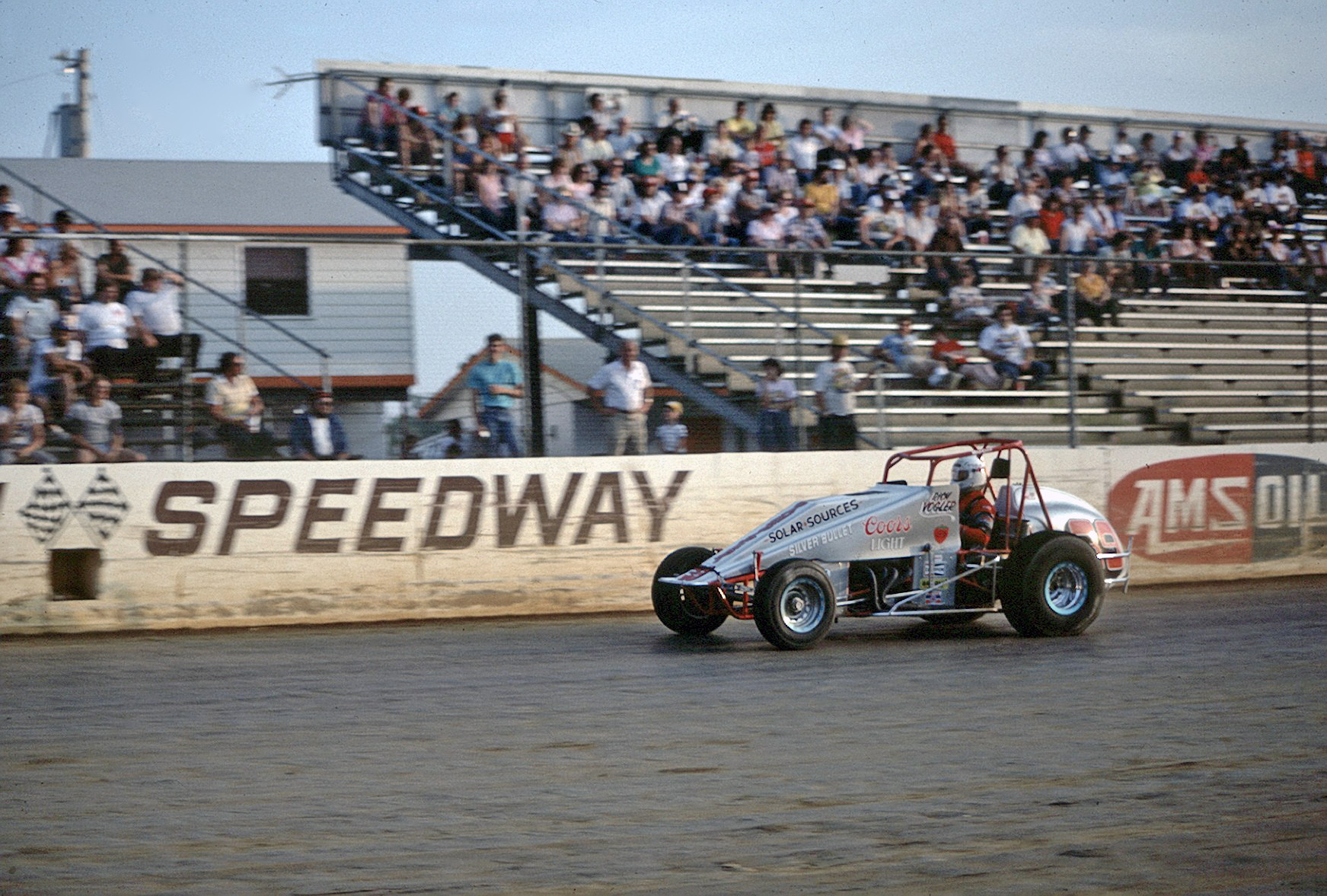
Rich Vogler's USAC Silver Crown car in 1986

- World of Outlaws Sprint Cars (1985-2005, 2012)
- ASCoC (1981–83, 2019)
- World of Outlaws Late Model (2003–12)
- Super DIRTcar Big-Block Modified Series (2006–12)
- ARCA Menards Series (1964–65, 1989–90)
- MARC Racing Series(1958) *Owned by ARCA Racing now.
- NASCAR Midget Division (1958)
- USAC Silver Crown Series (1986)
- USAC National Sprint Car Series (2008)
- AMA American Flat Track (64-65, 83-84, 87-10)
- NTPA Tractor Pull (2019)

Most information about races came from The Third Turn and also Hagerstown Speedway schedule.

== Records ==
Half Mile Track
Division	Driver	Time	Date
410 Sprint	Mark Kinser	14.945	07/31/99
Super Late Models	Gregg Satterlee	17.089	10/13/18
Big Block Modified	Billy Decker	19.016	06/23/05
Late Model Sportsman	Brad Lowe	18.649	07/29/23
Crate Late Model	Logan Roberson	19.660	09/14/24
UMP Modified	George Dixon	20.259	04/15/23
Semi Late	Steve Kent	21.414	09/13/24
Pure Stock	Jason Wilkins	22.673	07/20/24

Records from 01/06/25

1/20th of a mile track
Class	Driver	Time
Junior Honda	Gavin Miller	7.491
Senior Honda	Blake Davis	7.446
Heavy Honda	Kane Rogers	7.779
Light 160	Tyler Henry	7.135
Heavy 160	Joey Amantea	7.080
Junior Animal	Tyler Henry	7.365
Senior Animal	Blake Davis	7.167
Unrestricted Animal	Mackenzie Hixon	6.942
Light World Formula	Brian Place	6.906
Heavy World Formula	Joey Amantea	6.983

== Notable Drivers ==
- Steve Kinser
- Sammy Swindell
- Scott Bloomquist
- Tony Stewart
- Rico Abreu
- Kasey Khane
- Dave Blaney
- Lucas Wolfe
- Jack Hewitt
- Donny Schatz
- Jeff Gordon
- Cale Yarborough
- Ken Schrader
- Jimmy Owens
- Cole Whitt
- Brad Sweet
- Tyler Reddick
- Kyle Larson
- Brian Weaver
- Bob Keselowski
