= Five Mile Point Speedway =

Defunct motorsport venue in Kirkwood, New York

- Location: Kirkwood, New York
- Coordinates: 42.0930°N 75.8160°W
- Owner: Heath/Harpell family
- Opened: 1951
- Closed: 2023

Oval
- Surface: Clay
- Length: .4 km (0.25 mi)
- Turns: 4
- Banking: Semi-banked

Five Mile Point Speedway was a quarter-mile semi-banked dirt oval raceway located in the Southern Tier Region of New York State.

== Overview ==
In 1951, husband and wife Irving and Anna Heath built the Five Mile Point Speedway in Kirkwood, New York, just outside of Binghamton. Races were initially sanctioned by the Southern Tier Stock Car Club which also sanctioned the Shangri-La Speedway just 30 miles away.

Irving Heath died in 1965 and Anna remained the owner until selling the track to her grandson, "Heath" Andrew Harpell. In 2003 Harpell took control of the track, made several capital improvements to the facility, and kept the weekly modified programs rolling. Harpell, who also operated the modified Race of Champions series from 1996 to 2016, was named by Racing Promotion Monthly as regional promoter of the year in 2012.

The track was originally slated to close after the 2022 racing season, but racing was extended a year due to delays in the sale. Five Mile Point Warehouse Investors, an affiliate of Equilibrium Equities, proposed erecting two new warehouse buildings on the 41 acres.

== Events ==
For 72 years the speedway featured modified cars as its headliner with several notable drivers claiming multiple wins, including the "Pink Panther" Chuck Akulis (107), Mike Colsten (62), Dave Kneisel (54), Doug Worthing (46), Carl Nagel (37), Stewart Friesen (36), and Brian Weaver (29).

Harpell's Race of Champions dirt touring series appeared at the venue, and for many years the track also hosted its Southern Tier Open. In 1965, Five Mile Point began honoring the Heaths with the annual Heath Memorial Race.
