= Afton Motorsports Park =

Motorsport venue in Afton, New York, US

- Location: Afton, New York
- Coordinates: 42.2221°N 75.5216°W
- Owner: Afton Driving Park and Agricultural Association
- Operator: Ron Ford
- Opened: 1990
- Former names: I-88 Speedway; Afton Speedway; The New Afton Speedway; Afton Raceway Park
- Website: www.aftonmotorsportspark.net

Oval
- Surface: Clay
- Length: .6 km (0.37 mi)
- Turns: 4
- Banking: Semi-banked

Afton Motorsports Park is a three-eighths mile dirt oval raceway located on the Afton Fairgrounds in the Southern Tier Region of New York State.

== Overview ==
The Afton racetrack was originally constructed for horse racing in the early 1900s. It was later revived as a one-third mile oval for motorcycle racing, and in 1991 weekly stock car racing was introduced. Over the next two decades, the Afton Fair Board leased the facility to several different promoters. The track lay dormant for two years when Dave and Joanne Rocket from the Bethel Motor Speedway stepped in as the 2009 promoters.

In 2010 Jaime and Denise Page took over operations and renamed the facility the I-88 Speedway to reflect the nearby interstate. The Page's soon introduced Ron Ford as part of the promotional team, and in 2017 Ford contracted directly with the Afton Fair Board and rebranded the facility to the Afton Motorsports Park. Except for the 2024 season when the track was leased to the Spoonhower family, operators of the Thunder Mountain Speedway, Ford continues as the promoter.

== Events ==
The Afton Motorsports Park offers auto racing on Saturday evenings throughout the summer. The track features the Modifieds, Sportsman, 600 cc Modifieds, Factory Stock, and Four Cylinders. The venue also hosts the Short Track Super Series modified tour annually.
