= Thunder Mountain Speedway =

Motorsport venue in Center Lisle, New York

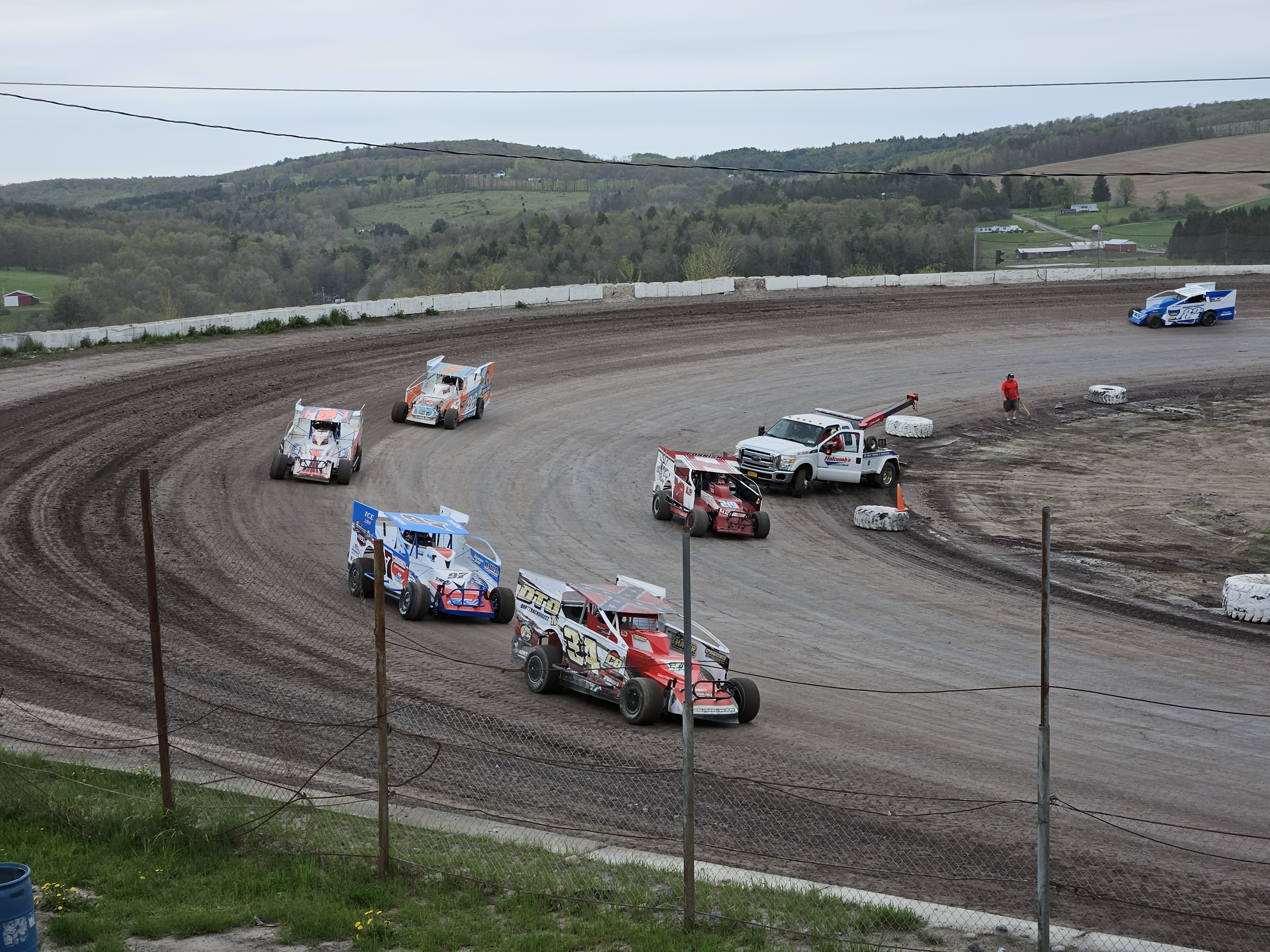
- Modifieds at the track in 2024
- Location: Center Lisle, New York
- Coordinates: 42.3644°N 76.0734°W
- Owner: Karl Spoonhower
- Opened: 1992
- Website: thundermtnspeedway.net

Oval
- Surface: Clay
- Length: .61 km (0.38 mi)
- Turns: 4
- Banking: High-banked

Thunder Mountain Speedway is a three-eighths-mile high-banked dirt oval raceway located in the Southern Tier Region of New York State.

== Overview ==
Thunder Mountain Speedway was opened in 1992 in rural Center Lisle, New York, by Karl Spoonhower. The location creates a natural bowl, allowing for a high banked race track and built-in seating for 2500 carved out of the surrounding hillside.

Spoonhower placed the facility for sale in 2006, but by 2013 he returned to ownership and has since made several capital improvements including reconfiguration of portions of the track's banking.

== Events ==
Weekly racing at Thunder Mountain is headlined by the powerful big-block/small-block Modifieds outfitted with sail panels. Other regular divisions include Sportsman, Crate 602 Sportsman, IMCA Modifieds, Rookie Sportsman XCel 600 Modifieds, Street Stocks and Four Cylinders. Special events have included the annual "Lightning on the Mountain" and the touring Empire Super Sprints and Super DIRTcar Series.
