= Harry Van Arsdale Jr. =

American trade unionist (1905–1986)

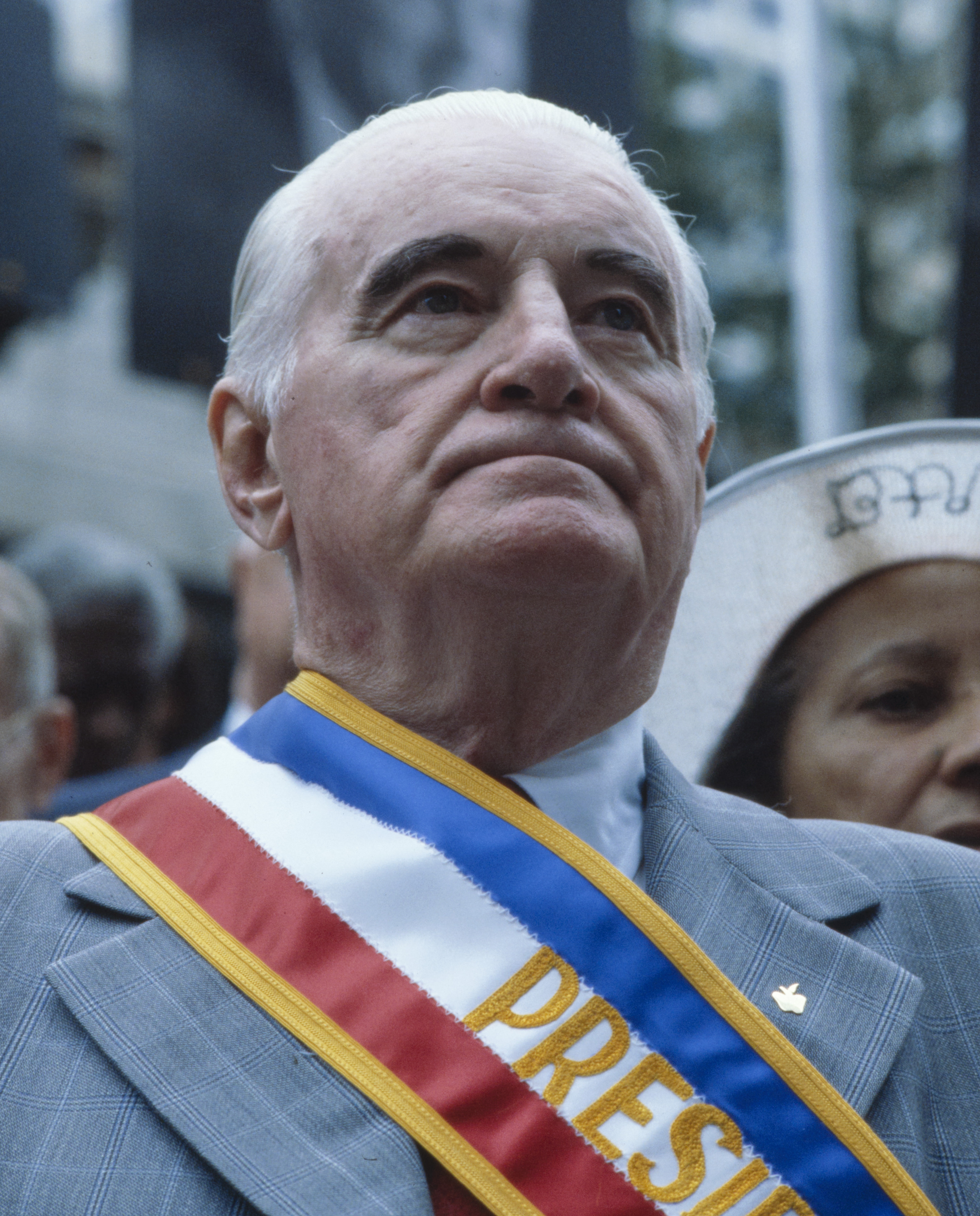
Van Arsdale in 1981

Harry Van Arsdale Jr. (November 23, 1905 – February 16, 1986) was an American labor and community leader in New York City who played a significant role in New York City's labor movement. He served as a business manager of Local Union No. 3 of the International Brotherhood of Electrical Workers (IBEW) from 1933 to 1968 and as president of the New York City Labor Council until his death in 1986. Throughout his career, Van Arsdale advocated for union workers' right, improved employee benefits and educational opportunities for workers and their families. He also helped develop Electchester, a cooperative housing community in Queens, NY built to provide affordable housing for union members.

== Early Life ==
Van Arsdale was descended from 17th-century Dutch immigrants to New York and a descendant of John Van Arsdale, a Colonial Army veteran of the American Revolutionary War, who climbed up a greased flagpole to retrieve a Union Jack flag which still flew during the evacuation of the British from New York. Van Arsdale was also related to noted historian James Riker.

== Labor Leadership ==
Harry Van Arsdale Jr. at the AFL-CIO Labor Day Parade 1968

Van Arsdale started as an electrician's helper in 1925 in Local 3, The International Brotherhood of Electrical Workers. In 1933, he was appointed as business manager of Local Union No. 3 and held this position until 1968. He served as the treasurer of the International Brotherhood of Electrical Workers from 1968 until 1978 and also served as the financial secretary of the Local Union No. 3 from 1968 until his death in 1986. In 1957, Van Arsdale was elected as president of the Central Trades and Labor Council of the American Federation of Labor (AFL) but following the merger of the Labor Council and the New York City Congress of Industrial Organizations (CIO), he became president of the newly merged NYC Central Labor Council, AFL-CIO until his death in 1986. Under his leadership, the council expanded its programs and established several committees, including the Rehabilitation Council in 1963, the Hispanic Labor Committee in 1970, and the Black Trade Unionists Leadership Committee in 1972.

Van Arsdale organized the Taxi Drivers Organizing Committee, which later became the New York City Taxi Drivers Union, Local 3036. He was elected as Local 3036's first president and was reelected in 1974.

During his time as president of the NYC Central Labor Council, he was a leader and supporter of the NYC Labor Movement. In 1962, Van Arsdale led approximately 9,000 master construction electricians in a strike demanding a reduction of the work week from 30 to 20 hours. The strike resulted in an agreement establishing a 25-hour basic work week.

Electchester Homes

== Electchester Housing ==
In 1949, Harry Van Arsdale Jr. founded the Electchester Housing complex in partnership with the Local Union No. 3 of the International Brotherhood of Electrical Workers. As a founding trustee of the Joint Industry Board (JIB) of the electrical industry, he worked with the Joint Industry Board members to purchase 103 acres of land in Pomonok and built 2,500 affordable housing units for members of the unions and their families to live.

== Legacy ==
Van Arsdale set up Camp Integrity in 1971, an affordable, 2-week summer camp for union members' children, which still operates today.

Following Van Arsdale's death in 1986, the Harry Van Arsdale Jr. Memorial Association was established to preserve his legacy and promote his commitment to workers' rights and labor education. Several institutions and landmarks have been named in his honor, including the Harry Van Arsdale Jr. School of Labor Studies, the Harry Van Arsdale Jr. Vocational High School (formerly Eli Whitney Highschool), and Harry Van Arsdale Jr. Avenue in Queens, NY. The association has also supported educational initiatives, including scholarships and paid internships for students at the school of Labor Studies.
