= General Dayton =

General Dayton may refer to:

- Elias Dayton (1737–1807), New Jersey Militia brigadier general in the American Revolutionary War
- Keith Dayton (born 1949), U.S. Army lieutenant general
- Oscar Veniah Dayton (1827–1898), Union Army brevet brigadier general of volunteers
