= Evacuation Day (New York) =

Holiday in New York City on November 25

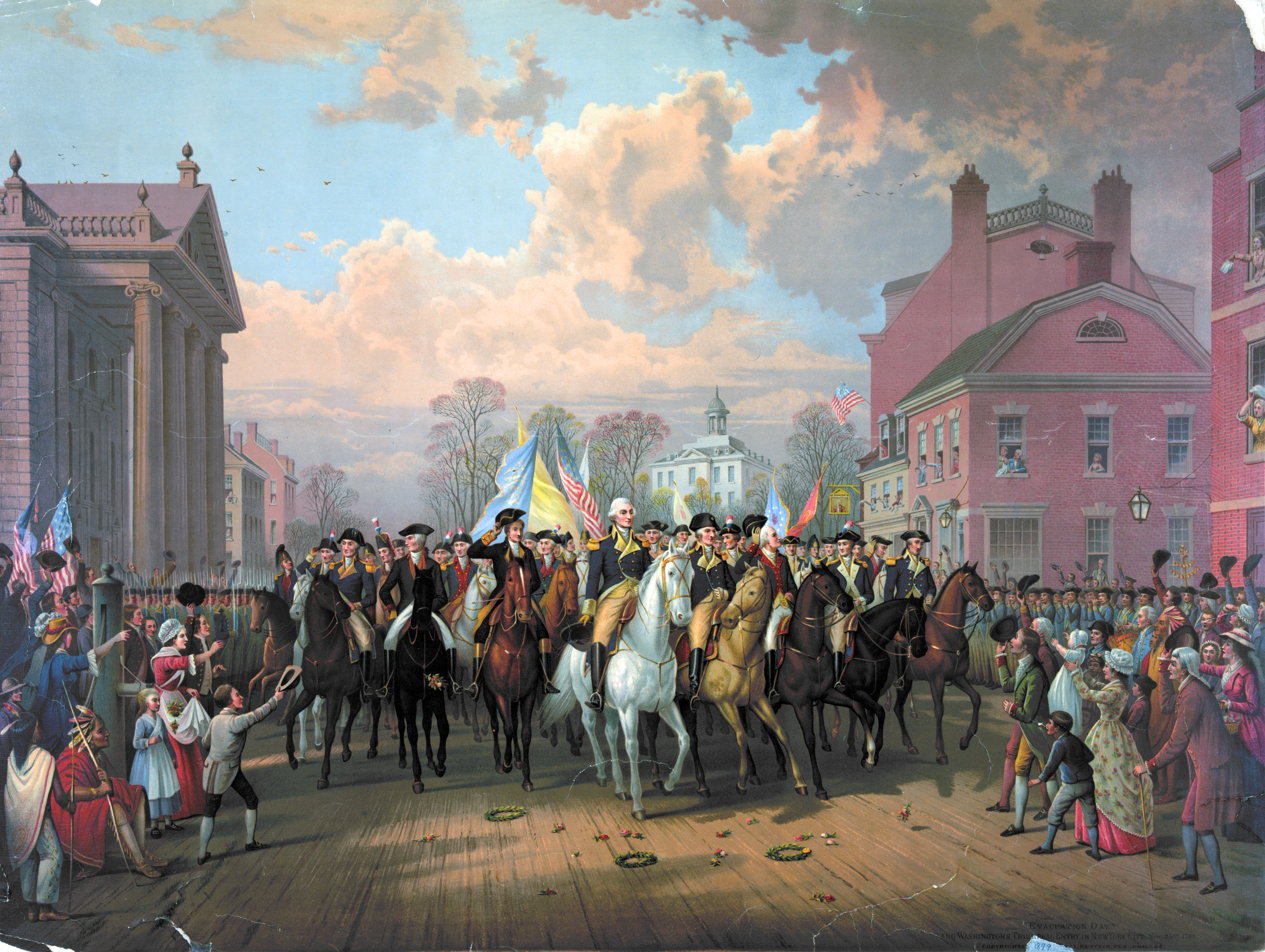
- The 1879 painting Evacuation Day and Washington's Triumphal Entry
- Observed by: New York City
- Significance: Date when the last British troops left New York
- Date: November 25
- Frequency: Annual
- First time: November 25, 1783

Evacuation Day on November 25 marks the day in 1783 when British forces evacuated New York City after the Treaty of Paris led to the end of the American Revolutionary War. In their wake, General George Washington led the Continental Army from his headquarters north of the city across the Harlem River and south through Manhattan to the Battery at its southern tip.

== History ==
=== Background ===
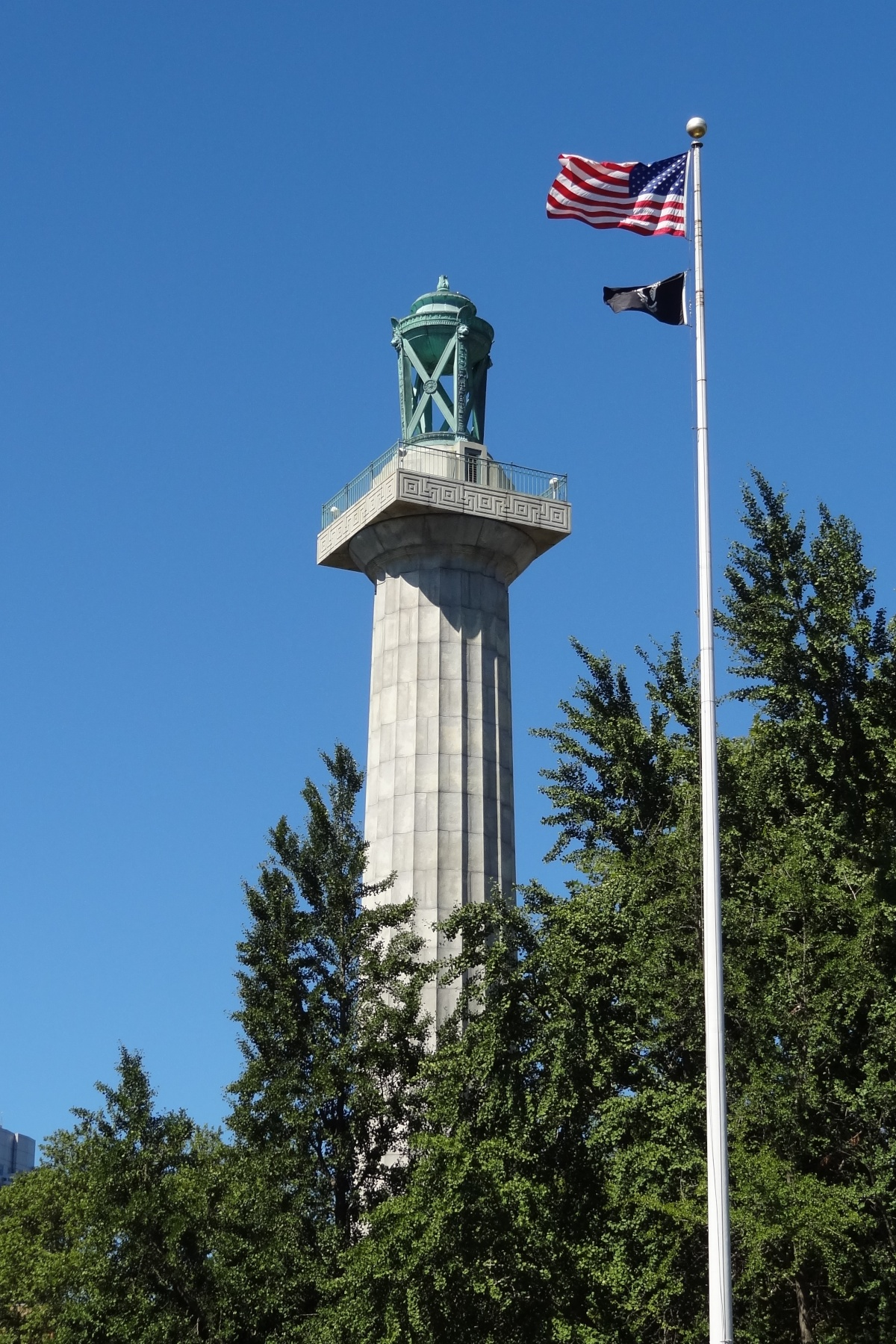
Prison Ship Martyrs' Monument in modern Fort Greene Park, Brooklyn.

Following the significant losses at the Battle of Long Island on August 27, 1776, General George Washington and the Continental Army retreated across the East River by benefit of both a retreat and holding action by well-trained Maryland Line troops at Gowanus Creek and Canal and a night fog which obscured the barges and boats evacuating troops to Manhattan Island. On September 15, 1776, the British flag replaced the American atop Fort George, where it was to remain until Evacuation Day.

Washington's Continentals subsequently withdrew north and west out of the town and following the Battle of Harlem Heights and later action at the river forts of Fort Washington and Fort Lee on the northwest corner of the island along the Hudson River on November 16, 1776, evacuated Manhattan Island. They headed north for Westchester County, fought a delaying action at White Plains, and retreated across New Jersey in the New York and New Jersey campaign.

For the remainder of the American Revolutionary War, much of what is now Greater New York was under British control. New York City (occupying then only the southern tip of Manhattan, up to what is today Chambers Street), became, under Admiral of the Fleet Richard Howe, Lord Howe and his brother Sir William Howe, General of the British Army, the British political and military center of operations in British North America. David Mathews was Mayor of New York during the occupation. Many of the civilians who continued to reside in town were Loyalists.

On September 21, 1776, the city suffered a devastating fire of an uncertain origin after the evacuation of Washington's Continental Army at the beginning of the occupation. With hundreds of houses destroyed, many residents had to live in makeshift housing built from old ships. In addition, over 10,000 Patriot soldiers and sailors died on prison ships in New York waters (Wallabout Bay) during the occupation—more Patriots died on these ships than died in every single battle of the war, combined. These men are memorialized, and many of their remains are interred, at the Prison Ship Martyrs' Monument in Fort Greene Park, Brooklyn.

During the British occupation, New York City became "an island of freedom in a sea of slavery" due to the Philipsburg Proclamation, which allowed all Patriot-owned slaves to escape to British lines and become free. The city became a haven for fugitive slaves from New York, New Jersey, Connecticut, Virginia, the Carolinas, and Georgia. In New York City, freed slaves found work as construction workers or as servants, cooks, and laundresses for the British garrison; "[for] the first time in their lives, they received wages and were effectively treated as free, although their ultimate fate remained uncertain." Major influxes of Black refugees arrived to the city after the British evacuation of Philadelphia in 1778 and the Franco-American victory at the siege of Yorktown in 1781.

=== British evacuation ===
In mid-August 1783, Sir Guy Carleton, the last British commander in the United States, received orders from his superiors in London to evacuate New York. Carleton subsequently informed President of the Confederation Congress Elias Boudinot that though he was proceeding with the evacuation as fast as possible it was not possible to give an exact date when it would be complete due to the dramatic increase of Loyalist refugees into New York (more than 29,000 refugees were eventually evacuated from the city). At the time the evacuation began, around 60,000 Loyalists resided in New York City, 4,000 of whom were Black Loyalists.

Boston King, a Black South Carolinian who escaped from slavery by fleeing to British-occupied Charles Town before making his way to New York City, noted in his memoirs that news of the Treaty of Paris' signing "diffused universal joy among all parties, except us, who had escaped from slavery." Rumors spread among Black New Yorkers that former slaves "were to be delivered up to their masters... fill[ing] us all with inexpressible anguish and terror." American enslavers and slave catchers entered the city, intent on re-enslaving former slaves. One of them was Daniel Parker, a Continental Army contractor whom Washington instructed to re-enslave his own slaves: "If by chance you should come at the knowledge of any of them, I will be much obliged by your securing them so I may obtain them again."

When negotiating the Treaty of Paris, American negotiators included a clause that required Britain to return back to their enslavers all former slaves who had fled to the British. Despite this, Carleton insisted the clause did not apply to former slaves who had been promised their freedom by British authorities. When he had personally met with Washington in May 1783, Carleton was asked about "obtaining the delivery of Negroes and other property", with Washington hoping that the British would keep a lookout for "some of [his] own slaves" who had escaped during the war. Washington was surprised by Carleton's response that to deprive former slaves of the freedom they had been promised would be a "dishonourable violation of the public faith".

When British ships began sailing out of New York Harbor, they carried onboard tens of thousands of British servicemen and white Loyalists along with 2,800 Black Loyalists. Carleton had instructed Brigadier-general Samuel Birch to create the Book of Negroes, which listed 1,136 men, 914 women, and 750 children who had left the city during the evacuation, and sent a copy to Washington. Most of the 2,800 Black Loyalists were from the American South, while approximately 300 were from New York. Those who were evacuated from New York went to various ports across the British Empire, including Nova Scotia, Florida, the West Indies and England. Carleton gave a final evacuation date of 12:00 noon on November 25, 1783. New York physician Alexander Anderson claimed a brief scuffle occurred between a British officer and the proprietress of a boarding house when the latter raised an American flag before noon. For years afterward, the British decision to evacuate the freed slaves and refusal to compensate their American enslavers remained a point of tension in Anglo-American relations. Following the evacuation New York was secured by American troops under the command of General Henry Knox.

=== Legendary flag-raising ===
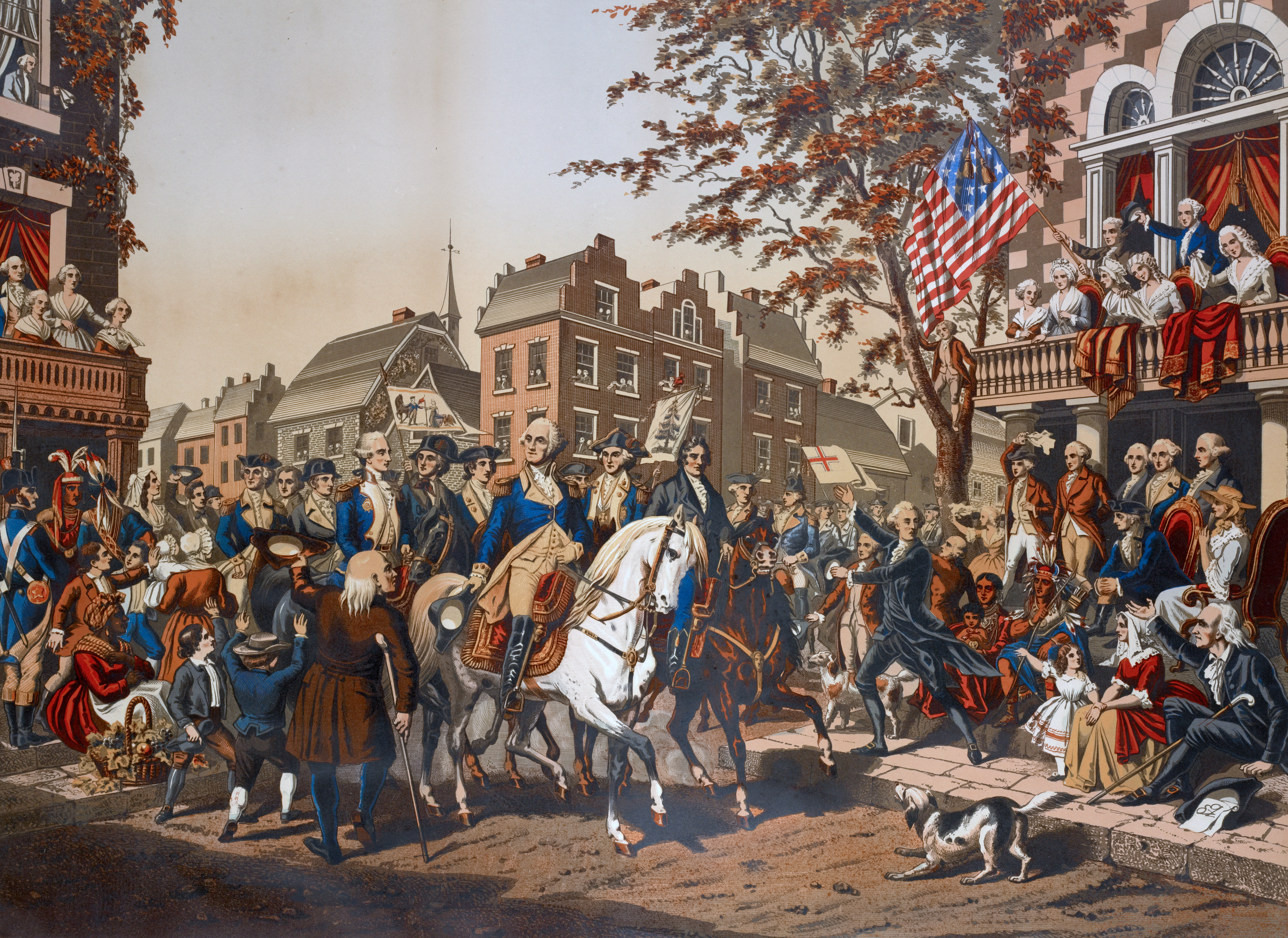
Washington's Grand Entry into New York, November 25, 1783 by Alphonse Bigot

Entry to the city under General George Washington was delayed until a still-flying Union Flag could be removed. The flag had been nailed to a flagpole at Fort George on the Battery at the southern tip of Manhattan. The pole was greased as a final act of defiance. After a number of men attempted to tear down the British colors, wooden cleats were cut and nailed to the pole and, with the help of a ladder, an army veteran, John Van Arsdale, was allegedly able to ascend the pole, remove the flag, and replace it with the Stars and Stripes before the British fleet had completely sailed out of sight. The same day, a liberty pole with a flag was erected at New Utrecht Reformed Church; its successor still stands there. Another liberty pole was raised in Jamaica, Queens, in a celebration that December.

=== Washington's entry ===
Finally, seven years after the retreat from Manhattan on November 16, 1776, General George Washington and Governor of New York George Clinton reclaimed Fort Washington on the northwest corner of Manhattan Island and then led the Continental Army in a triumphal procession march down the road through the center of the island onto Broadway in the Town to the Battery. The evening of Evacuation Day, Clinton hosted a public dinner at Fraunces Tavern, which Washington attended. It concluded with thirteen toasts, according to a contemporary account in Rivington's Gazette, the company drinking to:

1. The United States of America.
2. His most Christian Majesty.
3. The United Netherlands.
4. The King of Sweden.
5. The Continental Army.
6. The Fleets and Armies of France, which have served in America.
7. The Memory of those Heroes who have fallen for our Freedom.
8. May our Country be grateful to her military children.
9. May Justice support what Courage has gained.
10. The Vindicators of the Rights of Mankind in every Quarter of the Globe.
11. May America be an Asylum to the persecuted of the Earth.
12. May a close Union of the States guard the Temple they have erected to Liberty.
13. May the Remembrance of THIS DAY be a Lesson to Princes.

The morning after, Washington had a public breakfast meeting with Hercules Mulligan, which helped dispel suspicions about the tailor and spy. Washington was still staying at Fraunces Tavern the night of the earthquake a few days later, but being accustomed to battle, his sleep was untroubled.

=== Gallery ===
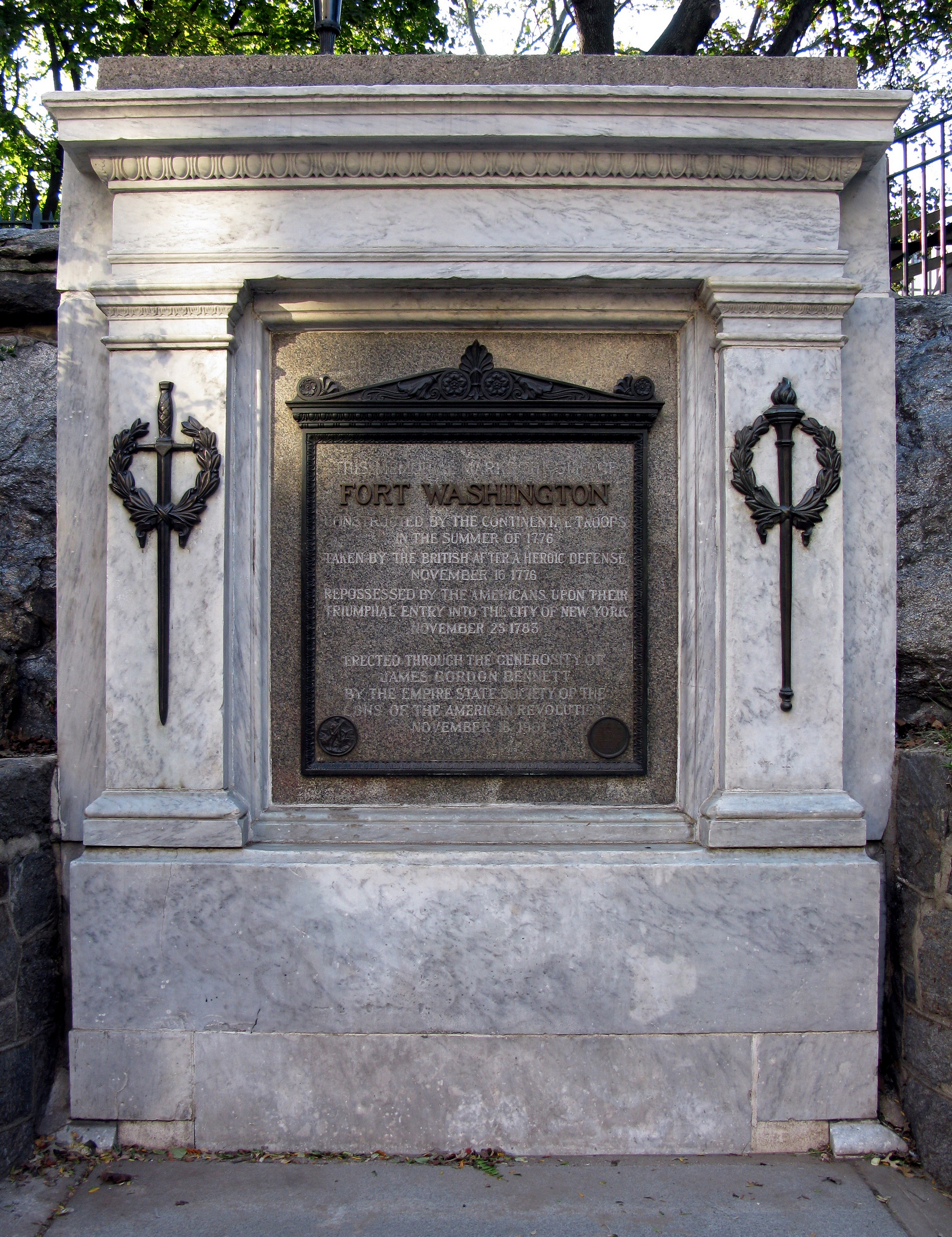
Monument in Bennett Park marking the November 16, 1776, evacuation and the November 25, 1783 triumphal entry of the American forces

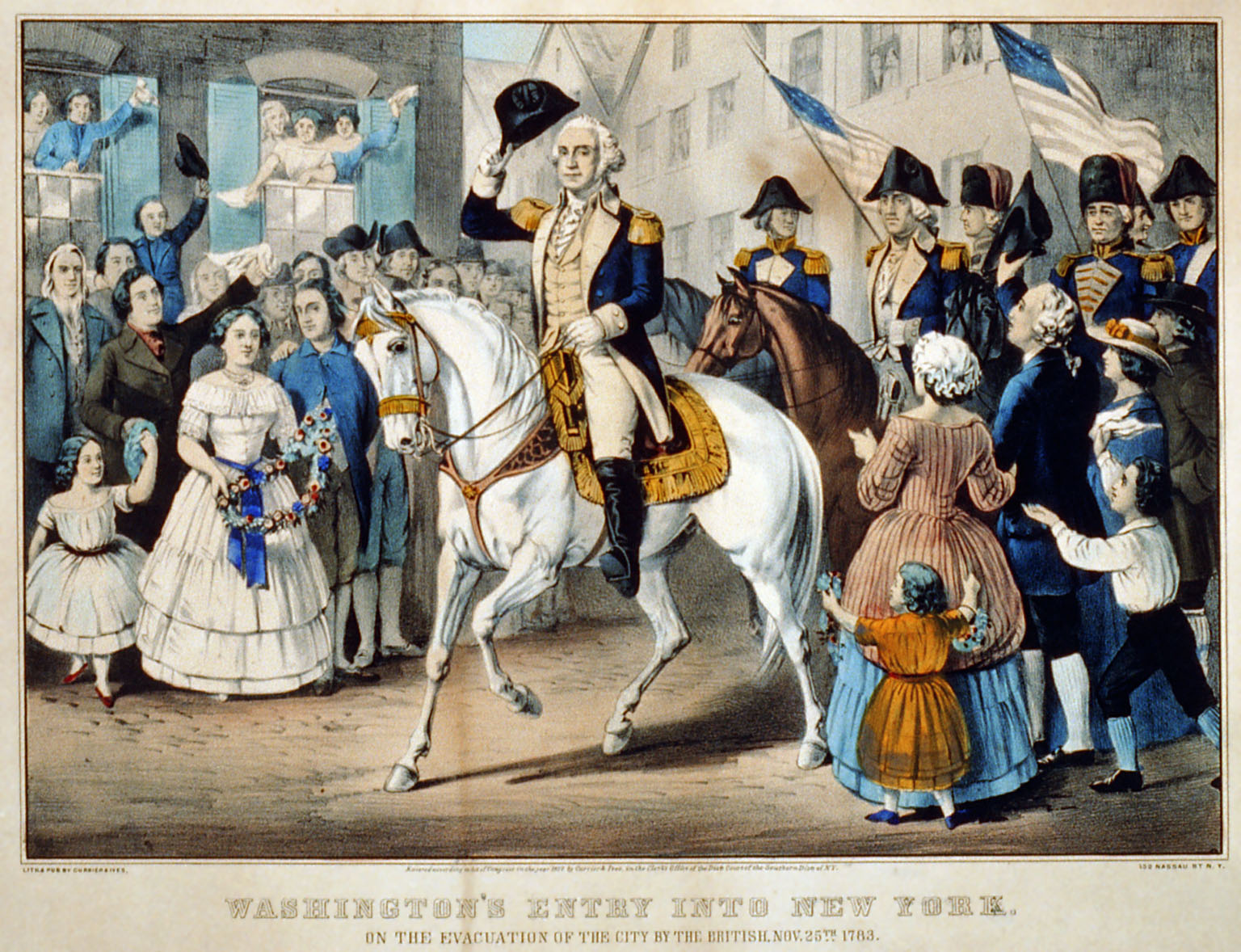
Washington's Entry into New York by Currier & Ives

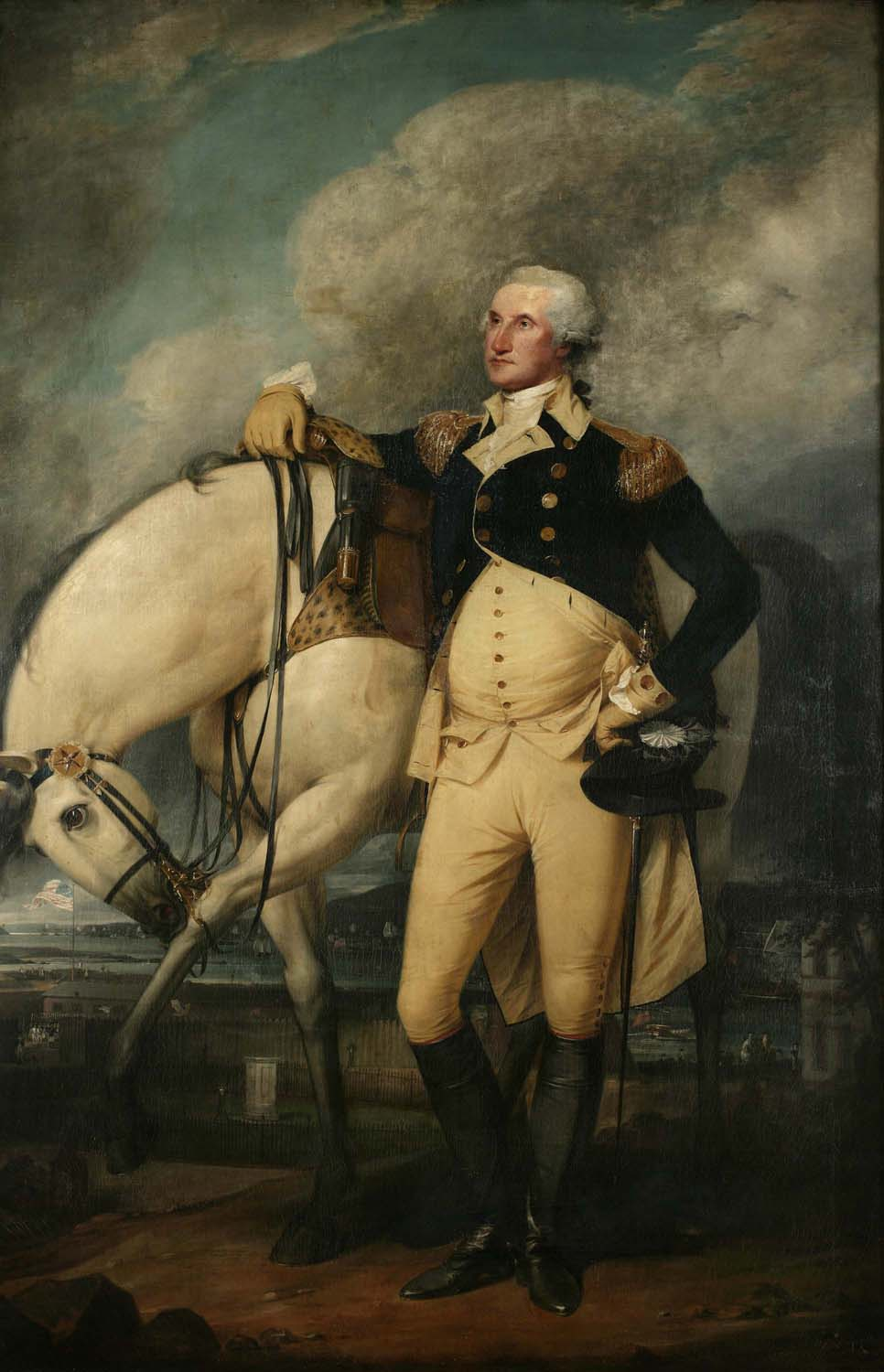
George Washington, Evacuation of New York, by John Trumbull, 1790, New York City Hall

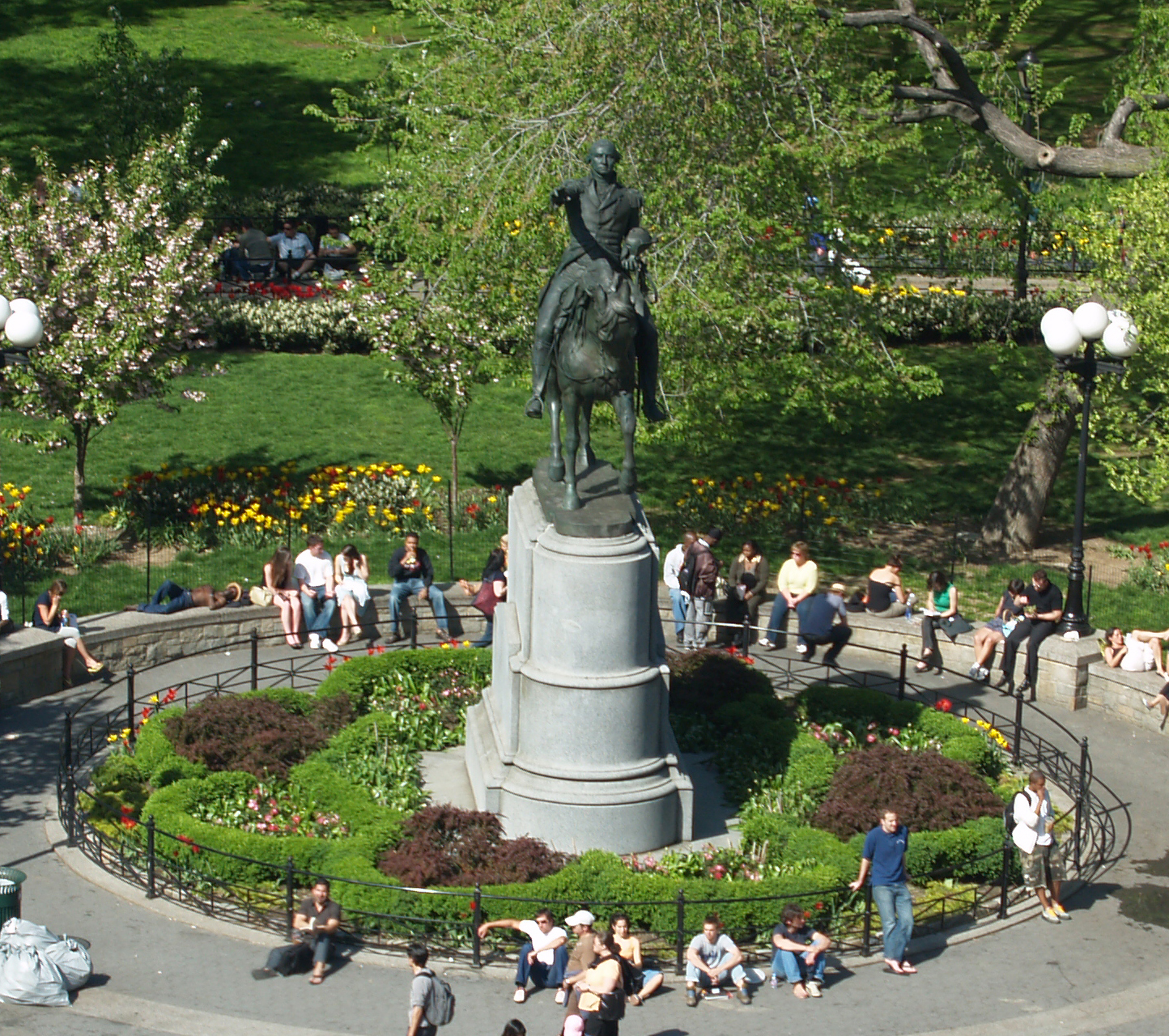
Henry Kirke Brown's 1856 Equestrian statue of George Washington in Union Square commemorates Washington's entrance to the city on Evacuation Day

=== Aftermath ===
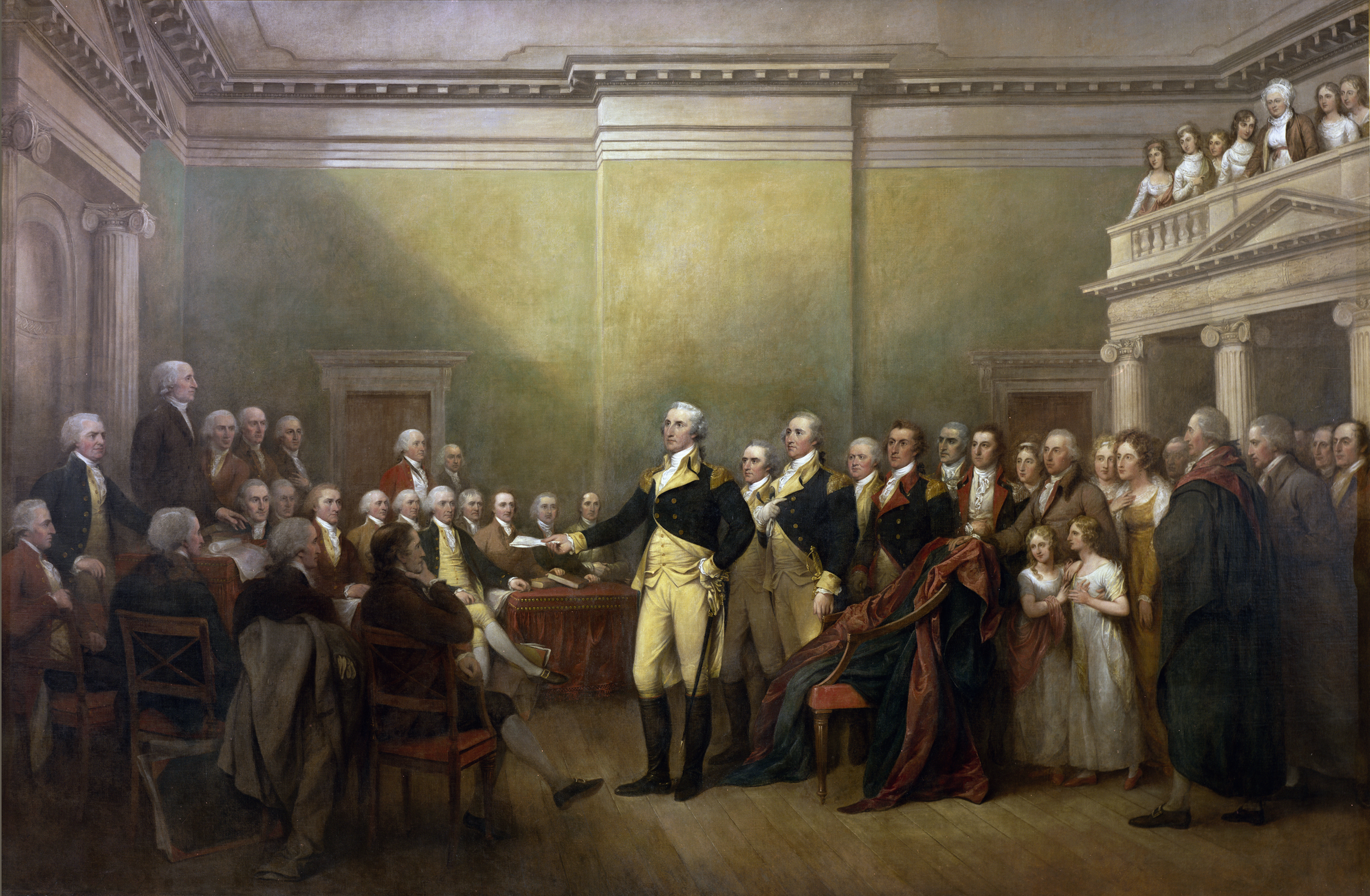
General George Washington Resigning His Commission, by John Trumbull, 1824

A week later, on December 3, the British detachment under Captain James Duncan, under orders of Rear Admiral Robert Digby, evacuated Governors Island, the last of part of the-then City of New York to be occupied, and afterward Major-General Guy Carleton departed Staten Island on December 5.

It is claimed a British gunner fired the last shot of the Revolution either on Evacuation Day or when the last British ships left a week later, loosing a cannon at jeering crowds gathered on the shore of Staten Island as his ship passed through the Narrows at the mouth of New York Harbor, though the shot fell well short of the shore. This has been described by historians as an urban legend.

On December 4, at Fraunces Tavern, at Pearl and Broad Streets, General Washington formally said farewell to his officers with a short statement, taking each one of his officers and official family by the hand. Later, Washington headed south, being cheered and fêted on his way at many stops in New Jersey and Pennsylvania. By December 23, he arrived in Annapolis, Maryland, where the Confederation Congress was then meeting at the Maryland State House to consider the terms of the Treaty of Paris. At their session in the Old Senate Chamber, he made a short statement and offered his sword and the papers of his commission to the President and the delegates, thereby resigning as commander-in-chief. He then retired to his plantation home, Mount Vernon, in Virginia.

== Commemoration ==
=== Early popularity ===
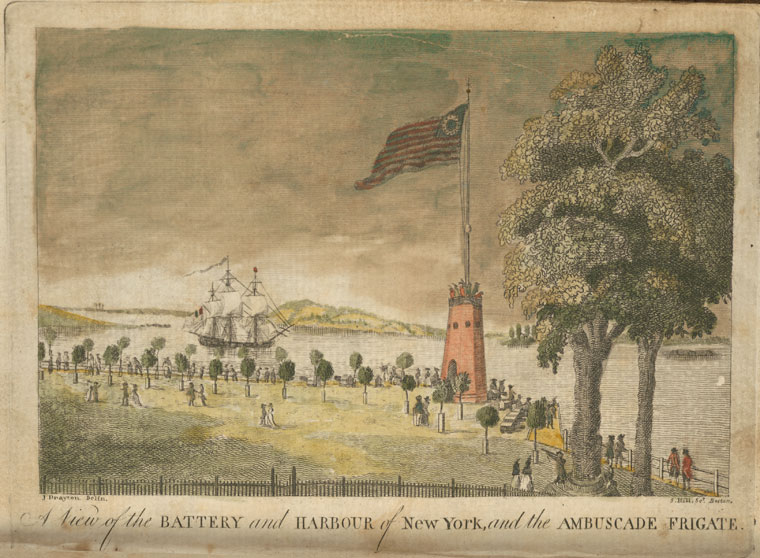
View of the commemorative flagpole at the Battery in its "gigantic churn", during a visit by the French frigate Embuscade (shortly before the action of 31 July 1793)

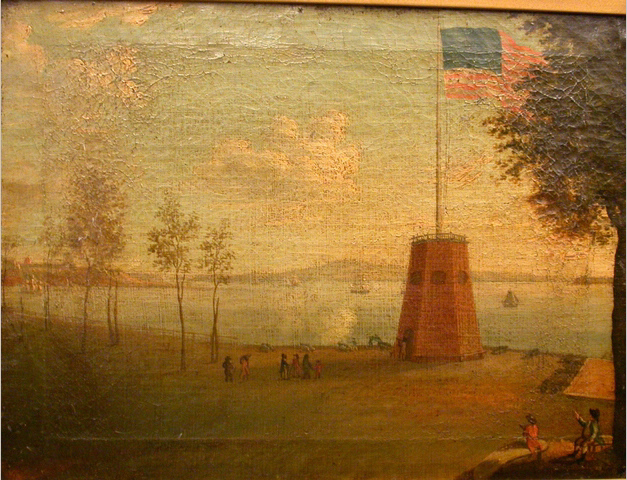
Painting of flagstaff and "churn" at the Battery

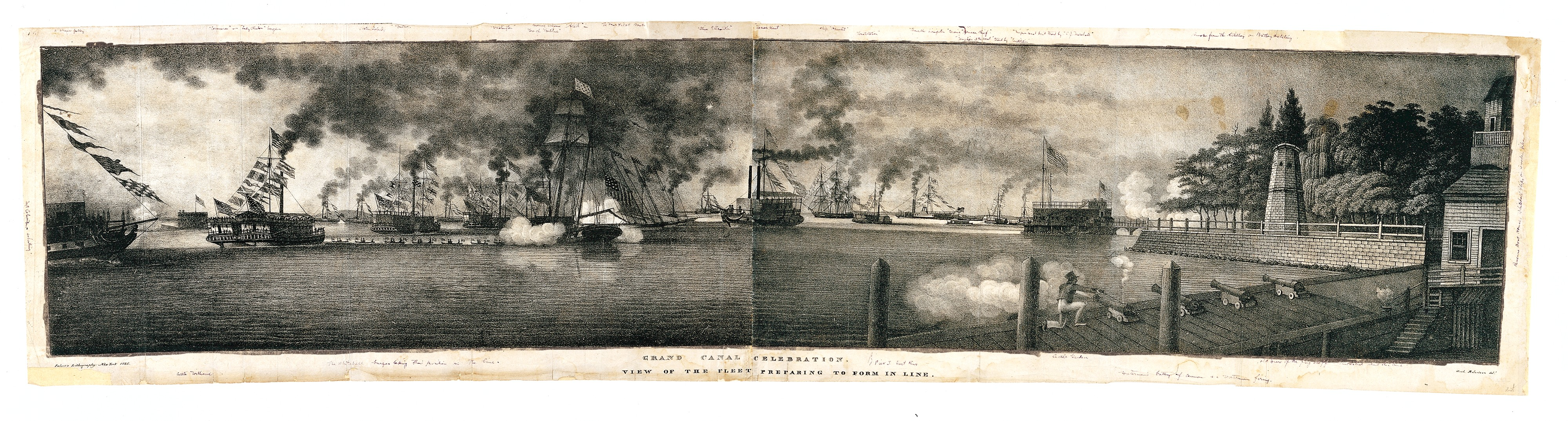
The "churn" after its retirement as flagstaff, c. 1825

Public celebrations were first held on the fourth anniversary in 1787, with the city's garrison performing a dress review and feu de joie, and in the context of a Federalist push for constitutional ratification following the Philadelphia Convention. On Evacuation Day 1790, the Veteran Corps of Artillery was founded, and it played a significant role in later commemorations.

The British Fort George at Bowling Green was also demolished in 1790, and in that year the "Battery Flagstaff" was built adjacent on newly reclaimed land at the Battery. It was privately managed by William and then Lois Keefe. Referred to colloquially as "the churn", as it resembled to some a gigantic butter churn, Washington Irving described a September 1804 visit to the commemorative flagpole in his A History of New York as "The standard of our city, reserved, like a choice handkerchief, for days of gala, hung motionless on the flag-staff, which forms the handle to a gigantic churn". In 1809, a new flagstaff further east on the Battery was erected with a decorative gazebo, and was operated as a concession until it was demolished about 1825. The military band led by Patrick Moffat of George Izard's Second Regiment of Artillery sometimes held evening concerts. The Battery Flagstaff commemorated Evacuation Day, and was the site of the city's annual flag-raising celebration for over a century. A flag-raising was held twice a year, on Evacuation Day and on the Fourth of July, and after 1853 flag-raisings on these days were also held at The Blockhouse further north. John Van Arsdale is said to have been a regular flag-raiser at the early commemorations.

The Scudder's American Museum / Barnum's American Museum held what it claimed was the original 1783 Evacuation Day flag until the museum's burning in 1865, and flew it on Evacuation Day and the Fourth of July.

On Evacuation Day 1811, the newly completed Castle Clinton was dedicated with the firing of its first gun salute.

On Evacuation Day 1830 (or rather, on November 26 due to inclement weather), thirty thousand New Yorkers gathered on a march to Washington Square Park in celebration of that year's July Revolution in France.

For over a century the event was commemorated annually with patriotic and political connotations, as well as embracing a general holiday atmosphere. Sometimes featured were greasy pole climbing contests for boys to recreate taking down the Union Jack. Evacuation Day also became a time for theatrical spectacle, with for example an 1832 Bowery Theatre double bill of Junius Brutus Booth and Thomas D. Rice. David Van Arsdale is said to have raised the flag after his father's death in 1836. There was also a traditional parade from near the current Cooper Union down the Bowery to the Battery.

=== Mid-19th century and decline ===
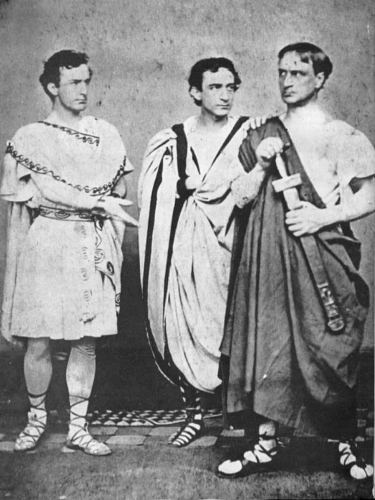
Julius Caesar at the Winter Garden Theatre, with John Wilkes Booth, Edwin Booth, and Junius Brutus Booth Jr., November 25, 1864

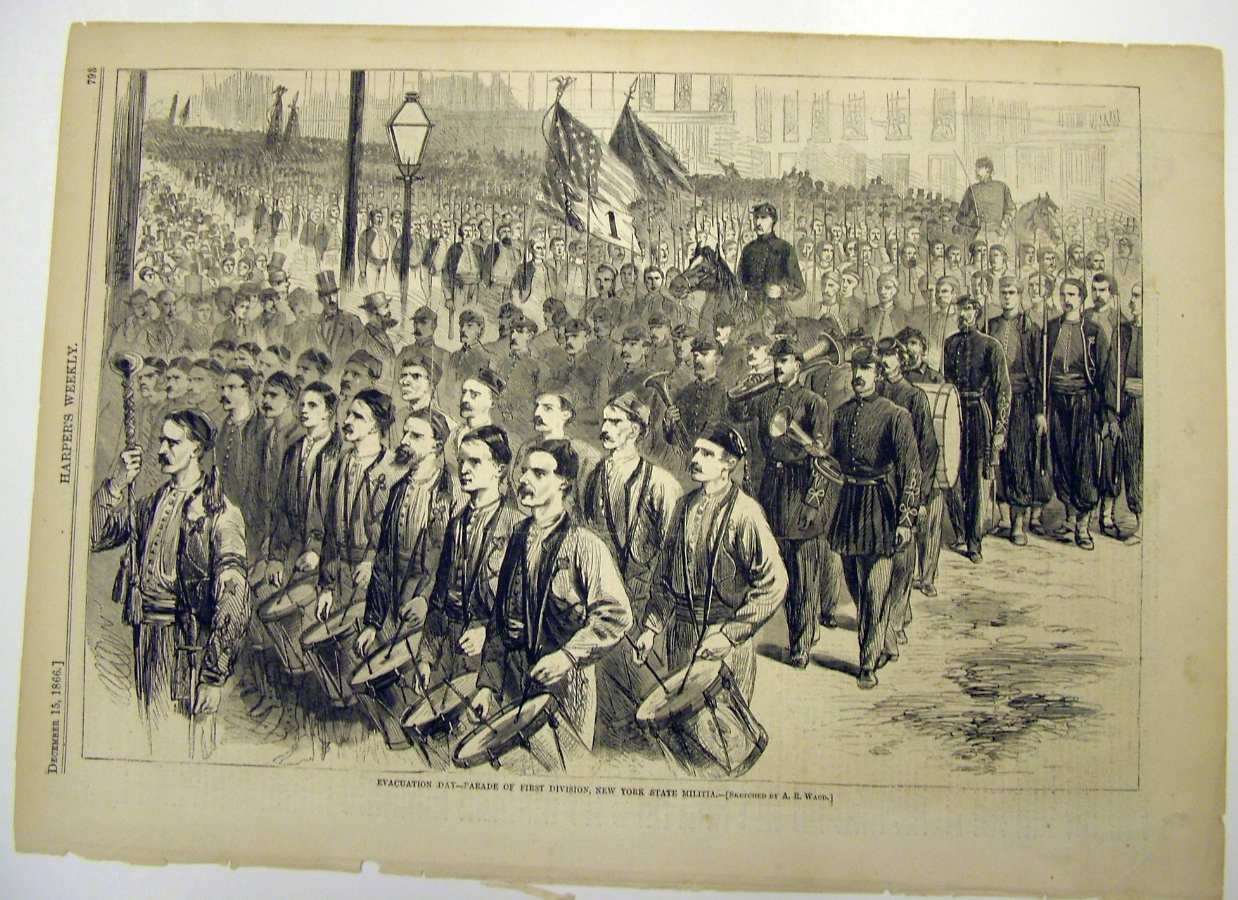
Evacuation Day Parade of First Division under Charles W. Sandford, New York State Militia, 1866

The importance of the commemoration was waning in 1844, with the approach of the Mexican–American War of 1846–1848.

However, the dedication of the monument to William J. Worth, the Mexican–American War general, at Madison Square was purposely held on Evacuation Day 1857.

In August 1863, the Battery Flagstaff was destroyed by a lightning strike; it was subsequently replaced.

Before it was a national holiday, Thanksgiving was proclaimed at various dates by state governors – as early as 1847, New York held Thanksgiving on the same date as Evacuation Day, a convergence happily noted by Walt Whitman, writing in the Brooklyn Eagle. The observance of the date was also diminished by the Thanksgiving Day Proclamation by 16th President Abraham Lincoln on October 3, 1863, that called on Americans "in every part of the United States, and also those who are at sea and those who are sojourning in foreign lands, to set apart and observe the last Thursday of November next as a day of thanksgiving." That year, Thursday fell on November 26. In later years, Thanksgiving was celebrated on or near the 25th, making Evacuation Day redundant.

On Evacuation Day 1864, the Booth brothers held a performance of Julius Caesar at the Winter Garden Theatre to raise funds for the Shakespeare statue later placed in Central Park. That same day, Confederate saboteurs attempted to burn down the city, lighting an adjoining building on fire and for a time disturbing the performance.

On Evacuation Day 1876, the statue of Daniel Webster in Central Park was dedicated.

A traditional children's rhyme of the era was:

It's Evacuation Day, when the British ran away,
Please, dear Master, give us holiday!

Over time, the celebration and its anti-British sentiments became associated with the local Irish American community. This community's embrace also may have inspired Evacuation Day in Boston, which began to be celebrated there in 1901, and taking advantage of the anniversary of the lifting of the Siege of Boston in 1776, which was by coincidence on Saint Patrick's Day.

=== Centennial and 20th century fading ===
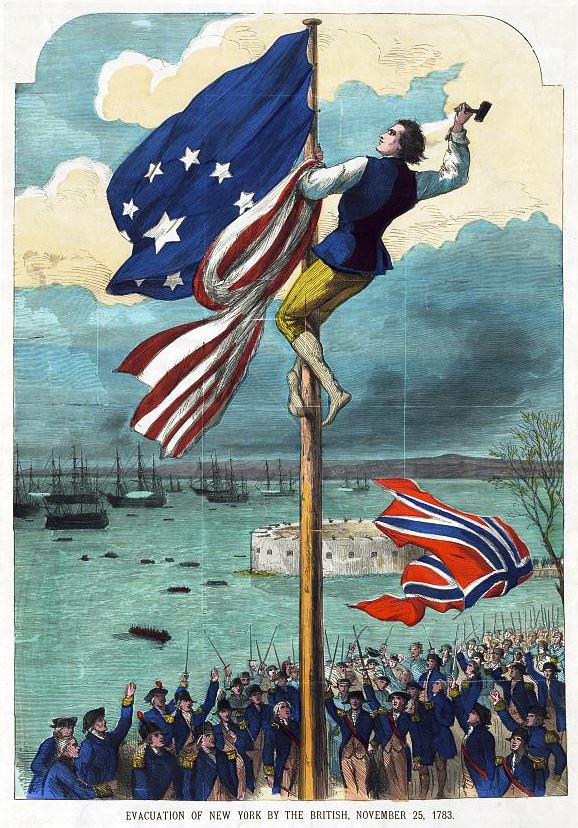
Raising the Stars and Stripes, 1883 print showing John Van Arsdale's 1783 raising of a variant of the Cowpens flag, and the discarding of an historically inaccurate version of the Union Jack (post-1801 with the blue and red reversed, not the pre-1801 flag)

As part of Evacuation Day celebrations in 1883 (on November 26), a statue of George Washington was unveiled in front of what is now Federal Hall National Memorial.

In the 1890s, the anniversary was celebrated in New York at Battery Park with the raising of the Stars and Stripes by Christopher R. Forbes, the great-grandson of John Van Arsdale, with the assistance of a Civil War veterans' association from Manhattan—the Anderson Zouaves. John Lafayette Riker, the original commander of the Anderson Zouaves, was also a grandson of John Van Arsdale. Riker's older brother was the New York genealogist James Riker, who authored Evacuation Day, 1783 for the spectacular 100th anniversary celebrations of 1883, which were ranked as "one of the great civic events of the nineteenth century in New York City." David Van Arsdale had died in November 1883 just before the centennial, having helped revive the event the year previous, and he was succeeded by his grandson.

On Evacuation Day 1893, the statue of Nathan Hale in City Hall Park was unveiled.

In 1895, Asa Bird Gardiner disputed the rights to organize the flag-raising, claiming that his organization, the General Society of the War of 1812, were the true heirs of the Veteran Corps of Artillery.

In 1900, Christopher R. Forbes was denied the honor of raising the flag at the Battery on Independence Day and on Evacuation Day and it appears that neither he nor any Veterans' organization associated with the Van Arsdale-Riker family or the Anderson Zouaves took part in the ceremony after this time. In 1901, Forbes raised the flag at the dedication of Bennett Park.

In the early 20th century, the 161-foot flagpole used was the mast of the 1901 America's Cup defender Constitution designed by Herreshoff, replacing a wooden pole struck by lightning in 1909. The event was officially celebrated for the last time on November 25, 1916, with a march down Broadway for a flag raising ceremony by sixty members of the Old Guard. Future commemorations were forestalled by the American entry into World War I and the alliance with Britain. The position of the flagstaff at this time was described as near Battery Park's sculptures of John Ericsson and Giovanni da Verrazzano. The commemorative flagpole was still listed as an attraction on a map of Battery Park in the WPA New York City Guide of 1939.

On Evacuation Day 1922, the main monument at Battle Pass in Brooklyn's Prospect Park was dedicated.

The flagpole was removed during the 1940-1952 construction of Brooklyn–Battery Tunnel and the relandscaping of the park. In 1955, the 102-foot Marine Flagstaff was erected in the approximate area of the one formerly commemorating Evacuation Day. Later, City Council President Paul O'Dwyer expressed interest in a restored flagpole for the 1976 United States Bicentennial. A bicentennial of Evacuation Day in 1983 featured the labor leader Harry Van Arsdale Jr. A commemorative plaque marking Evacuation Day was put on a flagpole at Bowling Green in 1996.

The Sons of the Revolution fraternal organization continues to hold an annual 'Evacuation Day Dinner' at Fraunces Tavern, and giving the thirteen toasts from 1783.

=== 21st century and renewed efforts ===
November 25, 1783
Evacuation Day Plaza
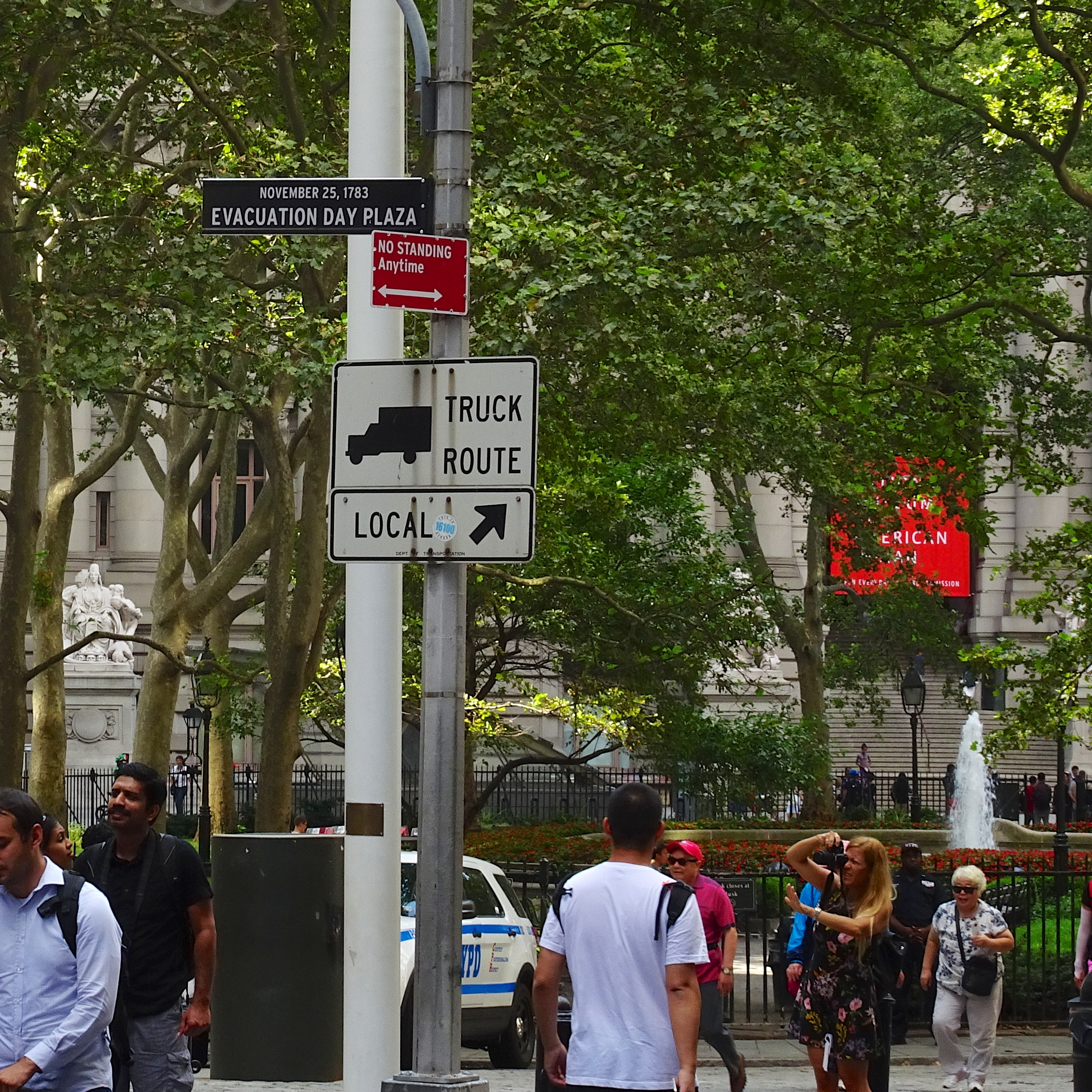
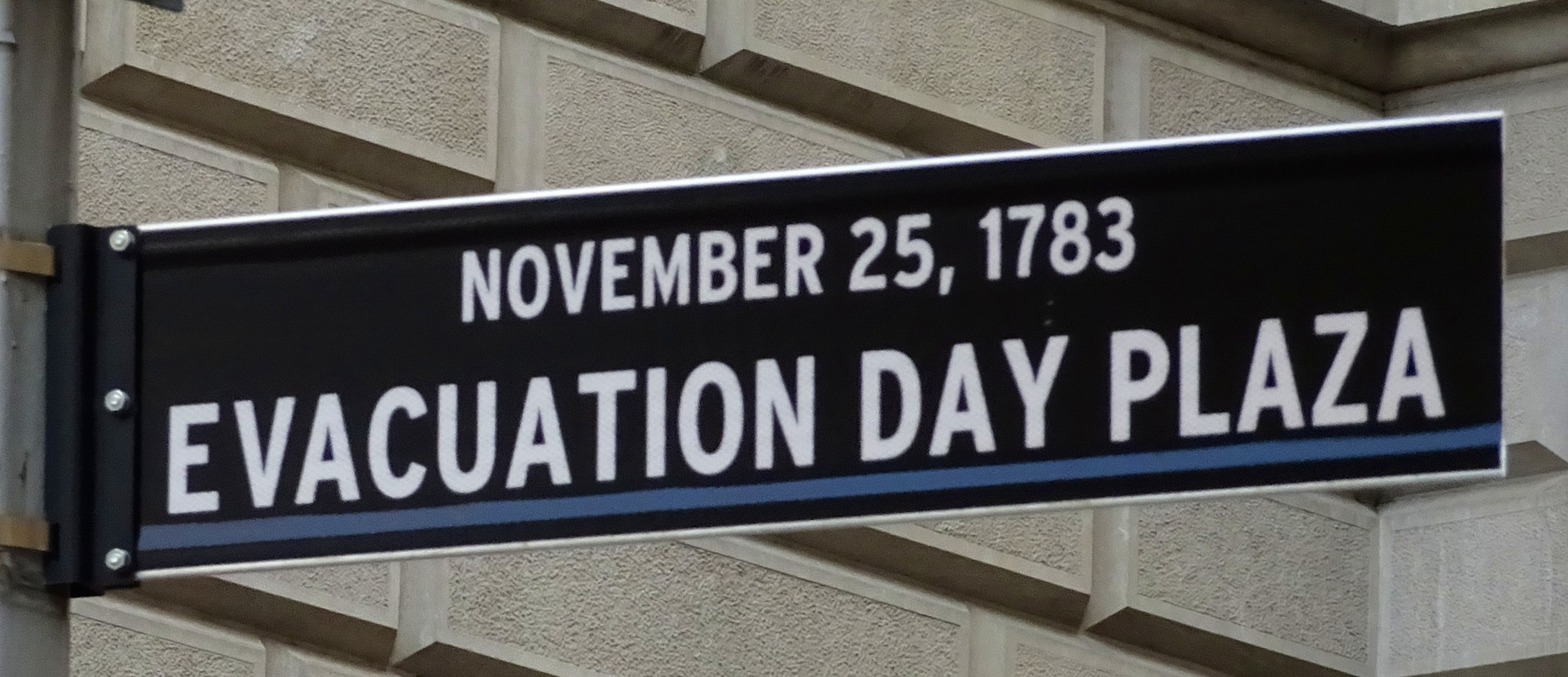

Though little celebrated in the previous century, the 225th anniversary of Evacuation Day was commemorated on November 25, 2008, with searchlight displays in New Jersey and New York at key high points. The searchlights are modern commemorations of the bonfires that served as a beacon signal system at many of these same locations during the revolution. The seven New Jersey Revolutionary War sites are Beacon Hill in Summit, South Mountain Reservation in South Orange, Fort Nonsense in Morristown, Washington Rock in Green Brook, the Navesink Twin Lights, Princeton, and Ramapo Mountain State Forest near Oakland. The five New York locations which contributed to the celebration are; Bear Mountain State Park, Storm King State Park, Scenic Hudson's Spy Rock (Snake Hill) in New Windsor, Washington's Headquarters State Historic Site in Newburgh, Scenic Hudson's Mount Beacon.

The renaming of a portion of Bowling Green, a street in Lower Manhattan, to Evacuation Day Plaza was proposed by Arthur R. Piccolo, the chairman of the Bowling Green Association, and James S. Kaplan of the Lower Manhattan Historical Society. The proposal was initially turned down by the New York City Council in 2016 because the council's rules for street renaming specify that a renamed street must commemorate a person, an organization, or a cultural work. However, with the support of Councilwoman Margaret Chin, and after supporters of the renaming pointed to streets and plazas named after "Do the Right Thing Way", "Diversity Plaza", "Hip Hop Boulevard", and "Ragamuffin Way", the council reversed its decision and approved the renaming of the street on February 5, 2016.
