= James Riker =

American historian (1822–1889)

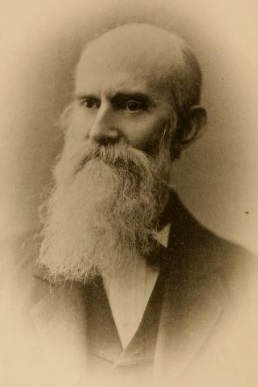
- James Riker
- Born: May 11, 1822; New York City, New York, U.S.
- Died: July 3, 1889 (aged 67)
- Occupations: Historian, genealogist
- Known for: Research on the history of New York City and New Netherland
- Notable work: The Annals of Newtown (1852); Harlem: Its Origin and Early Annals (1881)

James Riker (New York City, May 11, 1822 – 1889) was a New York historian and genealogist. His father, James Riker (Snr) was a merchant and landowner descended from early Dutch settlers. Riker left school at the age of sixteen to work in his father's business.

During the late 1830s and early 1840s he lived intermittently in Goshen, New York, where he ran a store. By the mid-1840s he had settled at the family home on Delancey Street in Manhattan. There Riker studied informally for the Presbyterian ministry and began the genealogical and historical research that would occupy him for much of his life. He collected original documents from the colonial era, copied extracts from documents in state and local archives and corresponded extensively with historians, relatives and old family friends. In 1848 Riker moved with his father to a new family home near to the corner of Fifth Ave. and 125th Street, Harlem. Two years later, having given up his plans for a religious career, he began work as a teacher in New York's Ward School 24. James Riker's first publication, a pamphlet genealogy that traced the Riker family to their early Dutch origins, appeared in 1851. He followed it with a substantial volume of local history, The Annals of Newtown (1852). Riker married Vashti Wood Horton in 1853, and the couple had several children. Vashti died in 1864, and Riker was remarried in 1867 to Anna C. Clute. Several years later Riker moved to Waverly, New York where he established the Waverly Library and Museum, and wrote two additional historical works, Harlem (city of New York): its origin and early annals (1881) and Evacuation Day, 1783, with Recollections of Capt. John Van Arsdale, of the Veteran Corps of Artillery (1883). In his later years Riker struggled financially and was forced to auction off a substantial portion of his library. James Riker died in 1889. James Riker's younger brother was the Civil War Colonel John Lafayette Riker who organized the New York Volunteer Regiment known as the Anderson Zouaves.

== Historical research ==
Riker's historical and genealogical research focused on colonial New York, particularly the early settlements of Harlem and Newtown. He collected original colonial documents, copied extracts from state and local archives, and corresponded with historians, relatives, and members of established New York families.

His research encompassed seventeenth-century Dutch records, genealogies, historical land titles, and the development of early New York communities. His surviving papers include Dutch manuscript records of Harlem dating from 1662 to 1674, original documents concerning the Harlem Commons, and transcripts of records relating to Newtown, Brooklyn, Kingston, and other settlements.

=== The Annals of Newtown ===
Riker's first publication was a genealogy of the Riker family, published in 1851. He followed it with The Annals of Newtown (1852), a substantial history of Newtown in Queens County. The work formed part of his broader research into the early settlement of New York and the histories of its colonial families.

=== History of Harlem ===
In 1881, Riker published Harlem (City of New York): Its Origin and Early Annals, a history of the early settlement of Harlem and its colonial families. His research included the examination of historical property records and land titles, genealogical material, and documents relating to the settlement's development.

Riker's surviving papers contain a draft manuscript of the book and associated research notes. His collection also preserves extensive records concerning Harlem property transactions, wills, surveys, accounts, and legal disputes.

Riker's history also examined the landholdings of Johannes de la Montagne, a physician and colonial official in New Netherland, and his descendants. The work traced the history of the family's northern Manhattan properties, including Montagne's Point and Montagne's Flat, and examined the deeds, land grants, and subsequent divisions associated with these tracts.

Riker used the surname Montanye in his original 1881 history, including in his discussion of the early settlement of Harlem. The posthumously published Revised History of Harlem (1904), revised from Riker's notes and enlarged by Henry Pennington Toler, contains an appendix entitled "The Montanye Family". In discussing historical variations of the surname, the revised work describes Montanye as the form "most accordant with modern usage", while recording that Johannes had signed his name "Mousnier de La Montagne" before adopting "La Montagne" in New Netherland.

=== Evacuation Day ===
Riker also researched the history of New York during the American Revolutionary War. In 1883, he published Evacuation Day, 1783, with Recollections of Capt. John Van Arsdale, of the Veteran Corps of Artillery, concerning the British evacuation of New York and the recollections of John Van Arsdale.

== Historical societies ==
Riker was admitted to the Holland Society of New York on March 28, 1889. The society's membership records identify his residence as Waverly, New York, and record his death on July 3 of that year.

== Waverly Library and Museum ==
After moving to Waverly, New York, Riker established the Waverly Library and Museum. He continued his historical research and writing while living there, publishing his histories of Harlem and Evacuation Day during this period.

In his later years, Riker experienced financial difficulties and was forced to auction a substantial portion of his library.

== Archival legacy ==
The New York Public Library preserves the James Riker Papers in its Manuscripts and Archives Division. The collection comprises approximately 16 linear feet of material, organized into 24 boxes and 39 volumes.

The collection contains original colonial documents, transcripts and translations, genealogical notes, correspondence, manuscripts, notebooks, historical maps, printed material, and photographs. Its holdings include seventeenth-century Dutch records of Harlem, original documents relating to the Harlem Commons, and research material concerning early New York settlements and families.

The papers also contain material relating to Riker's brother, Colonel John Lafayette Riker, including Civil War correspondence and military records associated with the 62nd New York Volunteer Infantry Regiment.

== List of published works ==
- A Brief History of the Riker Family, from Their First Emigration to This Country in the Year 1638, to the Present Time (1851)
- The Annals of Newtown (1852)
- Harlem (city of New York): its origin and early annals (1881)
- Evacuation Day, 1783, with Recollections of Capt. John Van Arsdale, of the Veteran Corps of Artillery (1883)
