= New York City Taxi Drivers Union =

The New York City Taxi Drivers Union, Local 3036 was formed on July 1, 1966, and advocated for the improved rights and working conditions for taxi drivers until the 1980s. The Local 3036 grew from its predecessor, the Taxi Drivers Organizing Committee, which was established by Harry Van Arsdale Jr., and won elections conducted by the National Labor Relations in 82 garages throughout New York City.

The Local 3036 elected Harry Van Arsdale Jr., as their first President and came to represent almost 35,000 workers at its peak. In 1971, the Taxi Drivers Rank and File Coalition was organized by disillusioned union members who advocated for fairer contracts and more democratic practices in the Local 3036. Van Arsdale was reelected as President of the Local 3036 in 1974. In the 1980s, under Ben Goldberg's leadership, the Local 3036 dissolved and merged with SEIU Local 74.

== Presidents ==
- Harry Van Arsdale Jr.
- Ben Goldberg

== See also ==
- Taxis of New York City
- Taxi Workers Alliance
- 1949 New York City taxicab strike
- 1980 New York City transit strike
