= David John Nevin =

David John Nevin (1830 - 1880) was an American officer in the Union Army during the American Civil War.

== Early life ==
Prior to enlisting in the Anderson Zouaves Infantry Regiment of New York (later the Sixty-second New York State Volunteers), Nevin had worked as a coal merchant in New York City.

== Civil War ==
Nevin enlisted in the Union Army on April 27, 1861, at New York City as Captain of Company 'D' of the Anderson Zouaves. He received his commission on June 30, 1861.

With the resignation of the regiment's lieutenant colonel William S. Tisdale, Nevin was promoted to lieutenant colonel a position which became effective on October 25, 1861. A muster roll dated October 15, 1861 makes the comment that Nevin's promotion was made "…by desire of the major (Oscar Veniah Dayton) and every line officer. Sanctioned by the Brig. General (John James Peck)".

Nevin's promotion from captain to lieutenant colonel appears to have been a reward for good service while the regiment was encamped at Tennallytown, DC. Upon arrival at the encampment the colonel, lieutenant colonel and major were found to be absent and the regiment demanded that Nevin take command. Nevin acted in the capacity of senior officer for several weeks before handing in his resignation to Peck who forwarded it to Major General McClellan with the recommendation that it be rejected.

With the death of the regiment's colonel, John Lafayette Riker at the Battle of Fair Oaks on May 31, 1862, Nevin assumed command of the regiment a promotion which became effective on June 20, 1862.

Nevin received special commendation from General Peck for his gallantry at the Battle of Fair Oaks. At the Battle of Malvern Hill, Nevin, due to sickness, commanded the regiment from an army ambulance.

In late 1862 Nevin was sentenced "to be cashiered," by a general court-martial. However, in April 1863 his sentence was disapproved by the Secretary of War, Edwin M. Stanton and he was released from arrest, and restored to his command.

After the removal of McClellan from command of the Army of the Potomac a conspiracy against Nevin by his superior officers was discovered, and Governor Seymour was "…called upon to see that justice was done to one of whose services the State might well be proud."

He briefly commanded a Brigade in the Sixth Corps at Gettysburg, PA in July 1863

Nevin was mustered out of the regiment on June 29, 1864 at Petersburg, Va. He was succeeded by Lieut. Colonel Theodore B. Hamilton who commanded the regiment until it was mustered out at Fort Schuyler New York on August 30, 1865.
