= Edward Brown Jr. =

Edward Brown
- Born: July 6, 1841; Ireland
- Died: November 5, 1911 (aged 70); New York City, US
- Burial place: Calvary Cemetery
- Military career
- Allegiance: United States of America
- Branch: United States Army
- Service years: 1861–1864
- Rank: Sergeant
- Unit: (New York (state)) 62nd Regiment New York Volunteer Infantry
- Conflicts: Second Battle of Fredericksburg
- Awards: Medal of Honor

Corporal Edward Brown Jr. (July 6, 1841 – November 5, 1911) was an Irish soldier who fought in the American Civil War. Brown received the United States' highest award for bravery during combat, the Medal of Honor, for his action during the Second Battle of Fredericksburg and at Salem Heights, Virginia between May 3 and 4, 1863. He was honored with the award on 24 November 1880.

== Biography ==
Brown was born in Ireland on 6 July 1841. He joined the 62nd New York Infantry in August 1861, and mustered out in September 1864. Brown died on 5 November 1911 and his remains are interred at the Calvary Cemetery in New York.

== Medal of Honor citation ==
Severely wounded while carrying the colors, he continued at his post, under fire, until ordered to the rear.

== See also ==
- List of American Civil War Medal of Honor recipients: A–F
