= Greasy pole =

Pole made slippery with grease

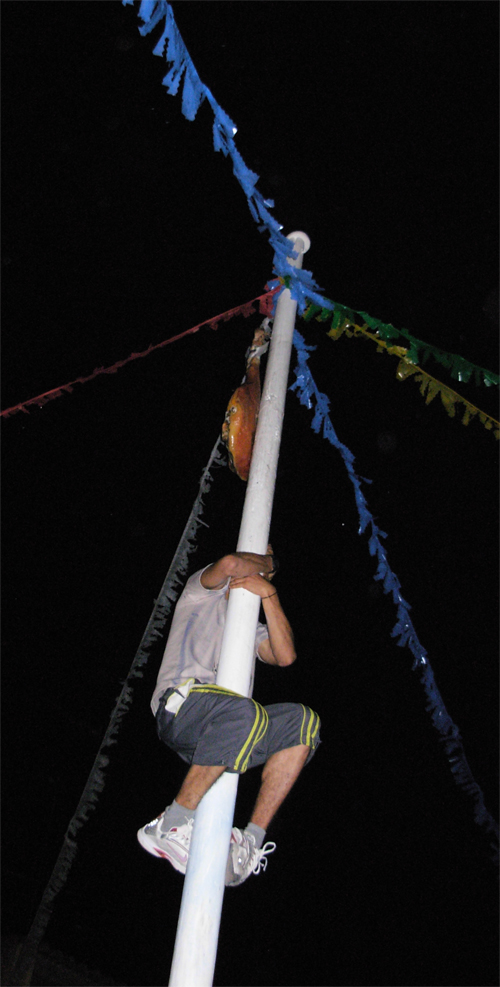
Climbing a vertical Cockaigne pole.

Greasy pole, grease pole, or greased pole refers to a tall pole that has been made slippery with grease or other lubricants and thus difficult to grip. More specifically, it is the name of several events that involve staying on, climbing up, walking over or otherwise traversing such a pole. This kind of event exists in several variations around the world. It is also used as a metaphor for the difficulty in achieving the top of one's career.

== Brazil ==
Pau de sebo or mastro de cocanha de consists of mastering a vertical mast or pole of diameter about 10cm (4-5 inches) and up to some eight meters tall (around 25 or 26 feet) lubricated with sebo or cocanha. At the top is suspended a hoop of about 1m diameter (3 feet) from which hang prizes about 50cm (18inches) from the pole. It is a typical activity for youths during the summer solstice festival in Portugal and Brazil. The game consists of first individual (tactical) attempts and if that fails then (strategic) team activities similar to the human castell pyramids performed in Catalonia but with the added safety of a stable central “fireman's pole” escape route. It may also be linked with a similar 16th Century game which originated in Naples and known in Spanish as Cucaña

== Canada ==
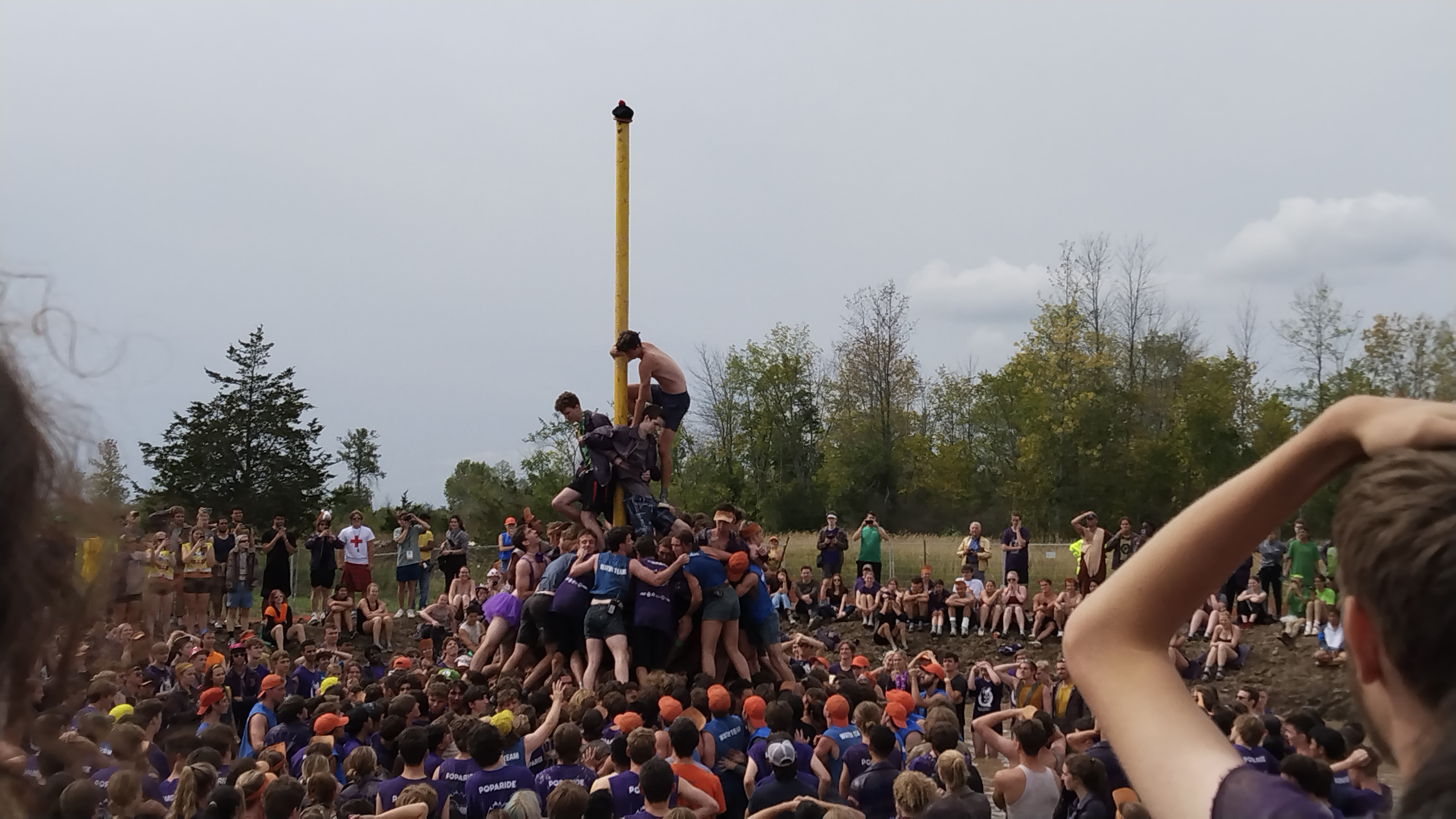
Queen's Engineering frosh climbing the grease pole in 2022

As part of Queen's Engineering Frosh Week, the incoming first-year engineering students must, with the help of the upper-year engineering students, climb to the top of a grease pole and remove a tam which is nailed to the pole's top. The Queen's Grease Pole is a metal football goalpost stolen by Queen's engineering students in 1955 from University of Toronto's Varsity Stadium. Currently, the pole is covered in lanolin and placed in the centre of a pit of muddy water referred to as the "Grease Pit", but from the first climbing of the pole in 1956 to 1988 the pole was covered in axle grease and it was only sometime between 1957 and 1967 that the pit was added to the event. There have been various other changes to the rules of the event since its inception, including the banning of the throwing of projectiles at the frosh attempting to climb the pole by upper years, removing unsanitary contents from the pit and allowing women to participate.

The Queen's Grease pole has been the subject of several heists, including in 2000 and 2015 by students from the University of Toronto.

The Bear River Cherry Carnival in Bear River, Nova Scotia offers $100 every year to the first person to walk out their greased pole and grab a Canada flag nailed to the end of the pole. The greased pole is held at a different time every year as they have to schedule it for high tide so there will be water below the pole for competitors to fall into. After the first round, competitors have to make it over the second red ribbon to continue on. Competitors must fall "clean". That is, competitors who grab the pole when falling are immediately disqualified.

== Indonesia ==
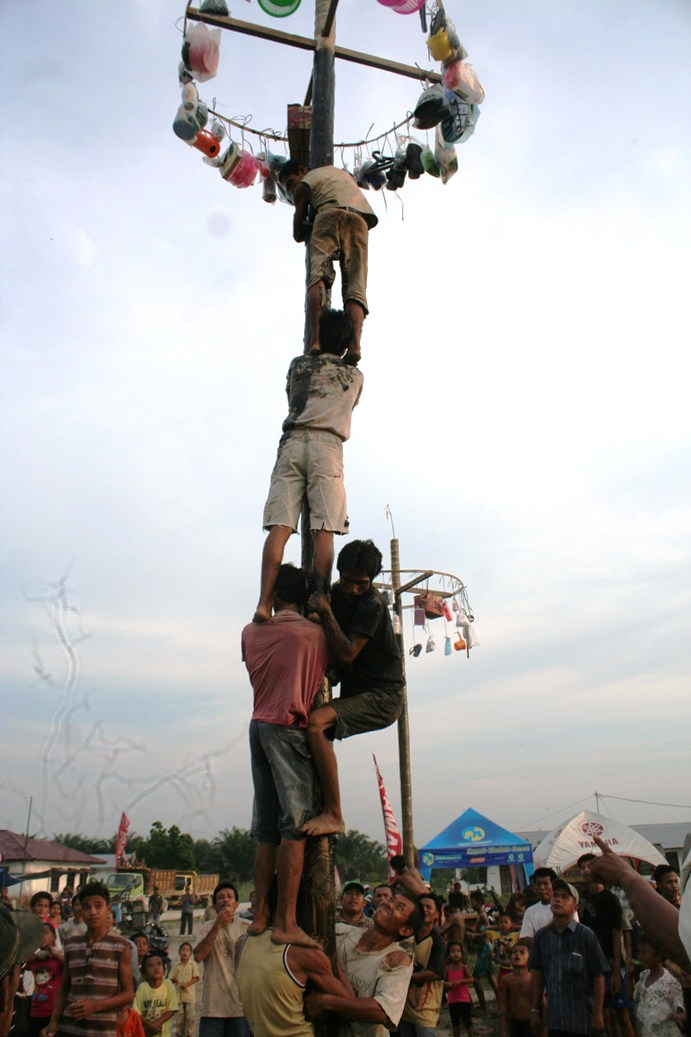
The panjat pinang taking place during the celebrations of the Independence day of Indonesia

In Indonesia, locally known as Panjat Pinang, is a popular game played to celebrate Independence Day. Communities around the country organize the Panjat Pinang on or near 17 August, which marks Indonesia's independence day. Organizers put precious gifts on top of the pole (using the branch of the Areca tree) such as bicycles, sports equipment, fridges, and any kind of everyday home equipments. The pole is greased and participants climb the pole in groups. The game has been played since Dutch colonial rule in the 1700s.

== Malta ==
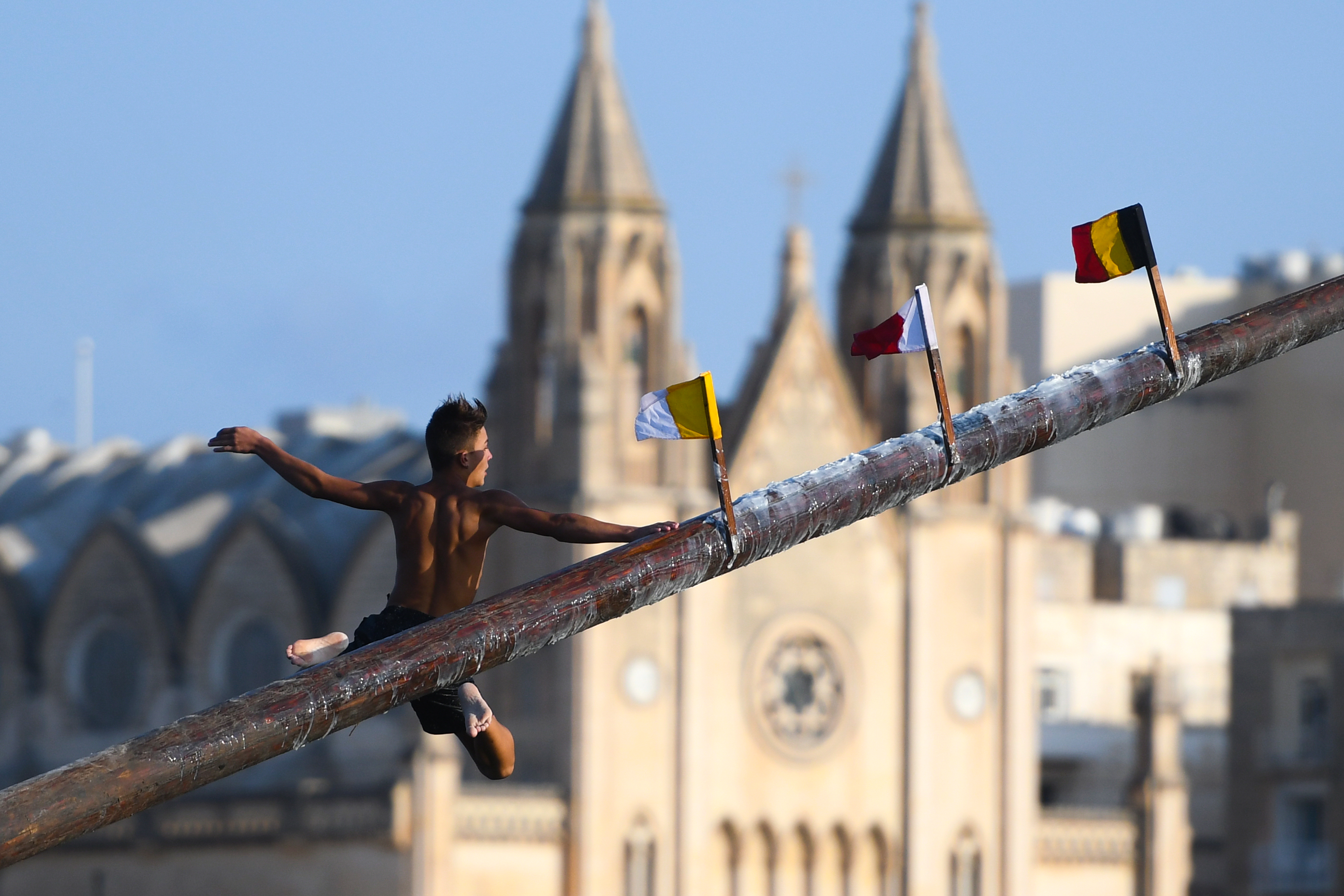
A contestant falls off the pole while playing Ġostra in Malta.

The cities of St. Julian's and Msida hold a yearly il-ġostra, the greasy pole game. St. Julian's is in honor of St. Julian, while Msida's is in honor of St. Joseph. Dating back to the Middle Ages, ġostra, which is derived from the Neapolitan cuccagna or cockaigne, is played in late-August during the Feast of St. Julian. For this game, a 20-metre (65 ft) wooden beam is attached to a pier at an angle and extended over the sea. Flags are attached to the pole, which is then greased. The aim of the game is to run to the end of the pole and grab one of three flags: a Belgian tricolor one, a yellow Vatican one, or a blue and white one dedicated to St. Mary. In the past, more towns held events like this, often attaching their pole to coal barges.

== United Kingdom ==
In the United Kingdom, contests to climb a greasy pole were held at numerous fairs including the Crab Fair in Egremont, Cumbria, where the contest continues to this day, alongside the annual Gurning World Championships. The prize for climbing the 30-foot-long (9 m) pole was originally a hat but from 1852 became a side of mutton, which if there are no winners is cut up and distributed to the poor. In 2004, the greasy pole was discontinued as an event at Egremont Crab Fair, due to high insurance cover costs should a participant fall from the pole. As of 19 January 2008 Egremont is home to a new greasy pole: a 30-foot-long (9 m) sculpture by Turner Prize winning artist Jeremy Deller and collaborator Alan Kane. This is the team's first piece of public art and marks the re-introduction of the Greasy Pole as a crab fair event.

A slight variation is provided at the annual Seaview Regatta on the Isle of Wight. Here the greasy pole is horizontal over the sea and competitors walk along it; the one who walks the furthest before falling into the sea is the winner.

Blakeney in North Norfolk also has a horizontal pole over water that is erected each year for the Blakeney regatta. The event dates back to 1873 and the prize for winning in the early days was a hog. The object is to reach the end by walking along the heavily greased pole, although in recent years sliding has become the preferred method. Blakeney regatta also includes sailing, swimming, and tug of war across the creek.

In July 2024 Grace Thompson of Blakeney became the first female ever to reach the end of the pole.

== United States ==
=== Philadelphia, Pennsylvania ===
Every May in Philadelphia's Italian Market neighborhood, contestants at the annual Italian Market Festival gather to try their hand at climbing a 30-foot tall pole greased with lard. This is part of a tradition, restarted in 2016 after a 20-year hiatus, that harkens back to the Italian "Albero della Cuccagna". In reward for successfully mounting the pole, climbers receive prizes in the form of meats, cheeses, money, and other gifts. This tradition gained notoriety in broader media following the Philadelphia Eagles' playoff run and eventual Super Bowl championship in February 2018, when police in the city resorted to greasing light poles in an attempt to prevent fans from climbing them, with local media highlighting the tradition as a reason the authorities struggled to discourage climbers.

=== Gloucester, Massachusetts ===
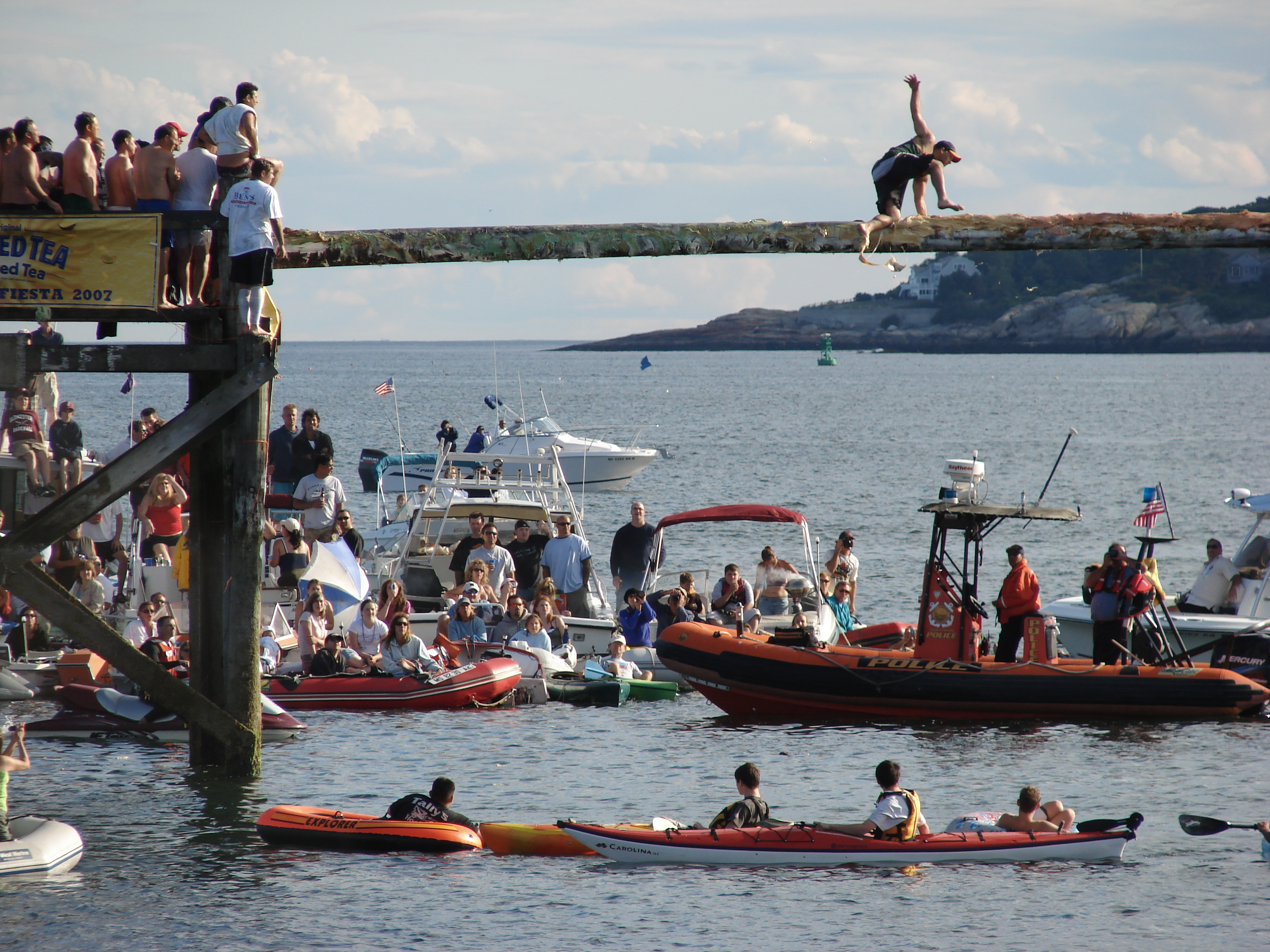
A man attempts to reach the flag during the St. Peter's Fiesta courtesy round in Gloucester on Sunday, 1 July 2007.

The Greasy Pole Contest takes place every year during St. Peter's Fiesta in Gloucester, Massachusetts. During this time, many young men try their luck at walking down a greased, wooden pole in the middle of Gloucester Harbor. The goal is to be the first person to grab the Italian flag at the end of the pole.

=== New York City ===
By legend, on 25 November 1783, Evacuation Day, John Van Arsdale climbed up a flagpole deliberately greased by the British as they left New York City, in order to remove the Union Jack and replace it with the Stars and Stripes. An annual flag-raising on the holiday commemorated the event for many years.

=== Annapolis, Maryland – United States Naval Academy ===
While not technically a "pole", each year, U.S. Naval Academy freshman (plebes) climb a greased Herdon Monument to represent formal completion of their first of four years. At the top of the greased monument, upper-classmen place the famous plebe "dixie cup" sailors hat, a blue-rimmed version of the classic white sailors hat. Unlike the other greasy pole competitions that have individuals competing against each other, the Herndon climb is a team event where the plebe class works together to hoist one of their members to the top to replace the "dixie cup" plebe hat with the standard midshipmen hat, signalling the end of their journey as plebes. Each year, the latest plebe class races to complete the challenge as fast as possible, with times compared against previous classes. By tradition, the class member who successfully switches out the hat will become the first admiral from that class.

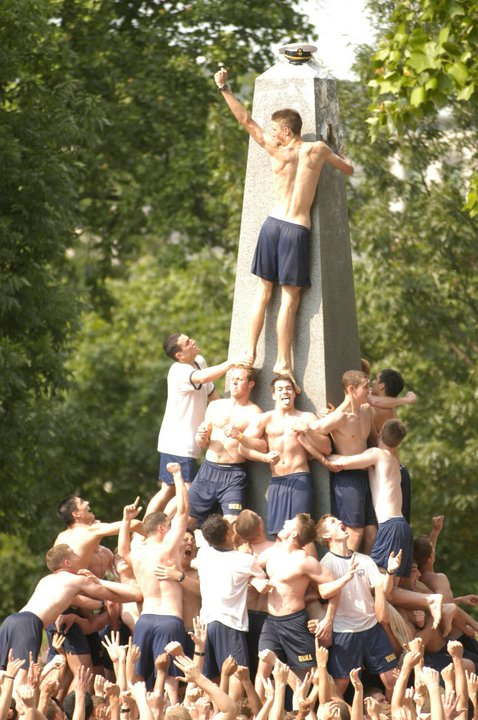
U.S. Naval Academy freshmen ("Plebes") climb Herndon Monument.

The ceremony also marks the beginning of Commencement Week.

=== Goleta, California ===
Dos Pueblos High School holds an annual Grease Pole contest as part of senior week activities. Teams of three senior students are invited to participate, and the team that touches the highest point on the pole is declared winner. The annual tradition was started by Steve Meister, who was a teacher and later vice principal at the school from 1970 until 2001.

== Other regions ==
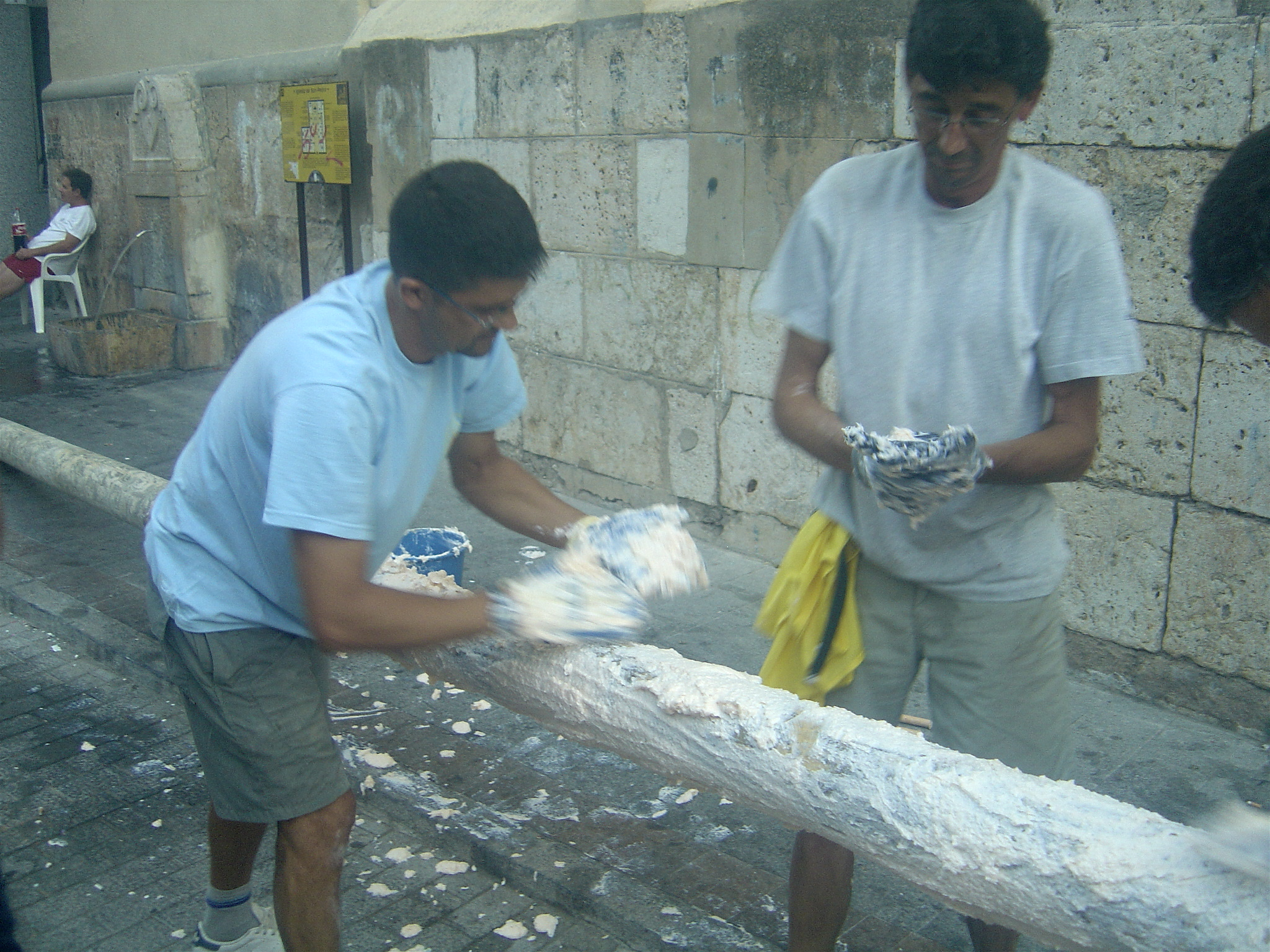
Greasing the pole during the Tomatina festival of Buñol, Spain.

=== Southern Europe ===
In Spain, the game of climbing the pole is known as a cucaña. In Italy it is called albero della cuccagna. In France, they call it mât de cocagne. In Montecchio, in the Veneto region of Italy, il palo della cuccagna, a soaped horizontal pole suspended over a lake is walked to seize a flag at the end as part of harvest festivities.

=== Netherlands ===
In the Netherlands it is called sprietlopen.

=== Chile ===
This is a traditional competition in Chile, where it's known as palo ensebado, people have to climb a pole which has been lubricated with pig or whale fat (depending upon the region) and reach a bag of money or assorted goods. This variant of the game is typically done on the Dieciocho's celebration.

=== Portugal and Brazil ===
This is also a tradition where it is called pau de sebo.

=== Eastern Europe ===
The game used to be part of rural fairs in some regions of the Russian Empire. The prize at the top of the pole was typically a pair of leather boots.

=== Turkey ===
Known as yağlı direk. Very similar to ġostra. It is especially common in the Black Sea Region. It is often made during the maritime and cabotage day.

=== Southeast Asia ===
The game has been introduced into other countries by European colonists. In Indonesia, the game is thought to have been introduced by the Dutch and is called Panjat Pinang, where young men climb up a greased pole to collect prizes. In the Philippines, it is a traditional fiesta game called Palo-sebo, derived from the Spanish cucaña. In Taiwan, an event called tshiúnn-koo (Chinese: 搶孤; Tongyong Pinyin: Ciǎng Gū; Pe̍h-ōe-jī: chhiúⁿ-koo; Tâi-lô: tshiúnn-koo) is usually held after the Ghost Festival, where multiple teams compete to aid one person climb up a pole greased with tallow to reach a mounted platform.

== Zogam ==
In Chin State, Burma, Mizoram, Manipur of India and Chittagong Hill Tract of Bangladesh, the game of climbing the pole is known as a Sukpum thaltawh and is played during the Zomi feast. It is one of the indigenous games of Zomi.

== Metaphor ==
The climbing of a greasy pole is also used as a metaphor for the difficulty in reaching the top of one's career. This metaphor was used in a well-known quote in Britain by Benjamin Disraeli after becoming the prime minister in 1868, "I have climbed to the top of the greasy pole."

== See also ==
- Greased pig chase
