= Old Guard (New York) =

Ceremonial and veterans unit

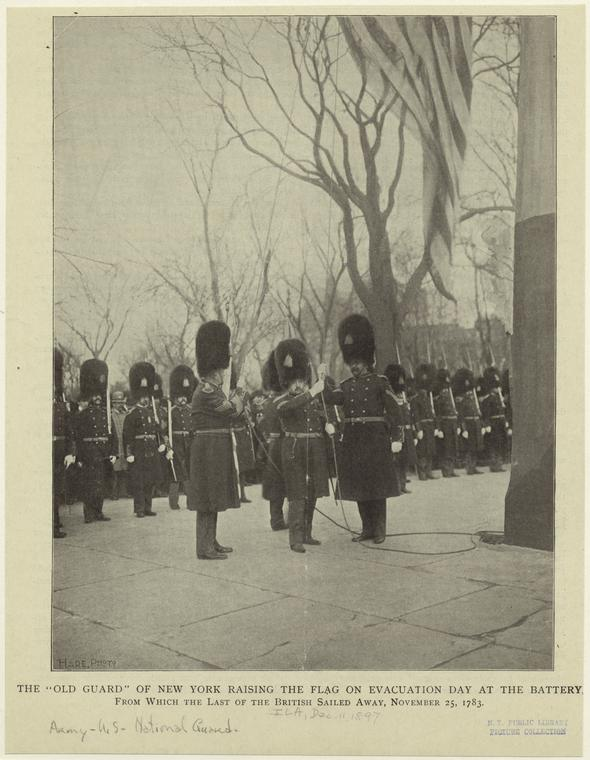
The Old Guard of New York raising the flag on Evacuation Day at the Battery, 1897.

The Old Guard of the City of New York is a patriotic organization of U.S. veterans established as a ceremonial unit in New York City. It was consolidated in 1868 when state legislation merged the predecessor organizations the New York Light Guard (1826, founded by Col. William W. Tompkins) and the New York City Guard (1833, founded by Capt. William M. McArdle). Its longtime headquarters was at 307 W 91st St from 1920-2016, a historic building dating from 1896 by the architect Clarence True. The unit was known for its elaborate uniforms with bearskin caps, its participation at civic events, and its annual ball.

The Old Guard Headquarters are located at 485 West 246th Street, Bronx, NY 10471. It has EIN 13-1673348 as a 501(c)(4) Civic Leagues and Social Welfare Organizations entity; in 2025 it claimed $163,275 in total revenue and total assets of $10,003,711. Its public mission statement is “To decorate the graves of our deceased military personnel, participate in patriotic events and support the morale of the active military, and promote social union and fellowship among its members, and with similar organizations in New York and other states.”
