= Oscar Veniah Dayton =

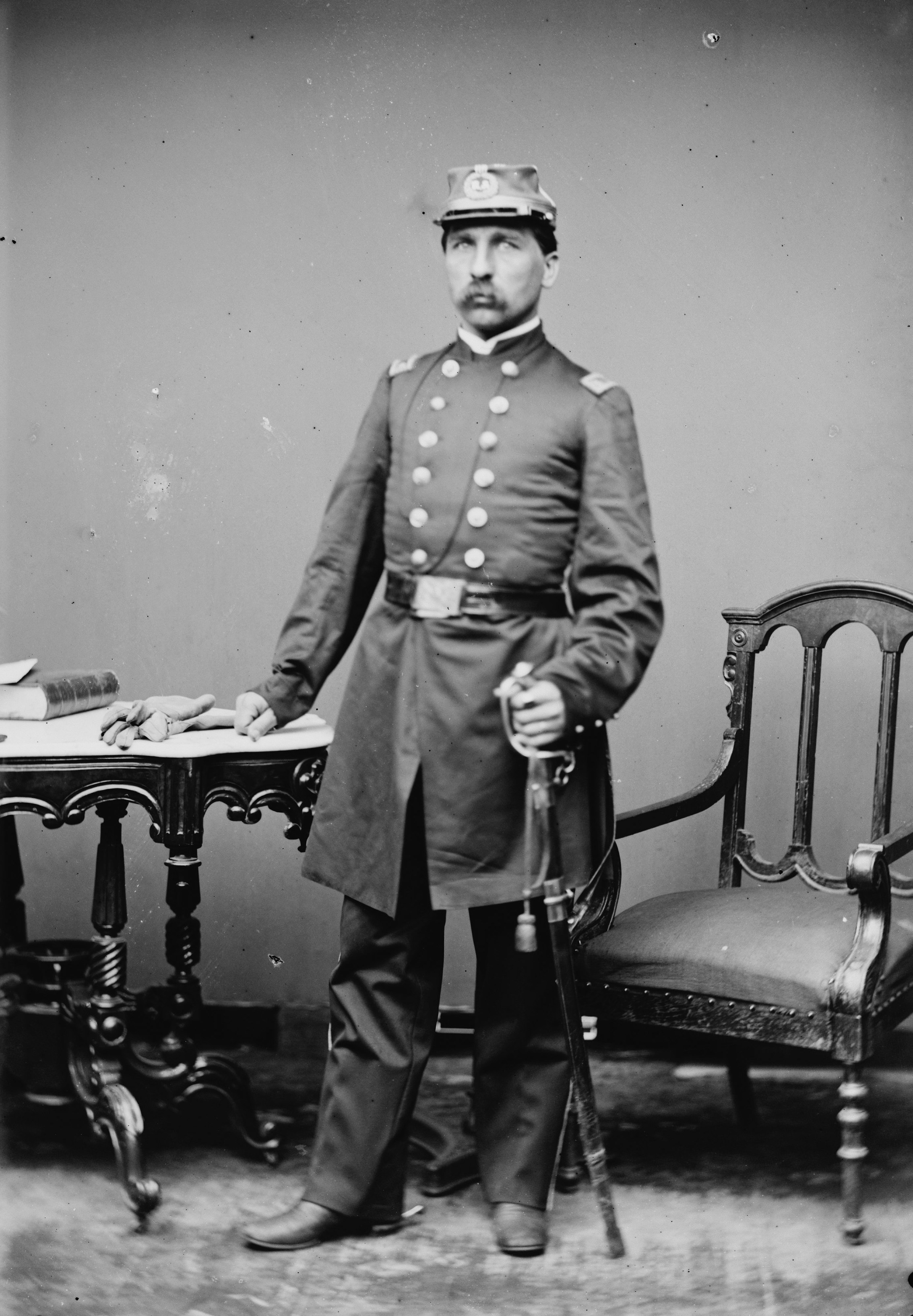
Oscar Veniah Dayton

Oscar Veniah Dayton (July 1, 1827 – October 30, 1898) was a commercial agent and broker, and an officer in the Union Army during the American Civil War.

== Early life ==
Dayton was born at Catskill, New York, the son of John Harvey Dayton and Charlotte Tompkins.

== Civil War ==
Dayton enlisted in the 62nd New York Volunteer Infantry Regiment, the Anderson Zouaves, at New York, NY on April 22, 1861, and was commissioned major on July 3, 1861.

He served under John Lafayette Riker. Following Riker's death at the Battle of Fair Oaks on May 31, 1862, David John Nevin was promoted to colonel and Dayton was promoted to Lieutenant Colonel on the field.

He was wounded at Malvern Hill on July 1, 1862. Dayton was discharged from the regiment on 21 November 1862, and transferred to the Veterans Reserve Corps, where he was, first, lieutenant colonel of the 1st VRC, then colonel and commander of the 19th VRC. He was brevetted brigadier general, US Volunteers, on March 13, 1865, for "faithful and meritorious services".

== Later life ==
Dayton died in London, England, and is buried there, at Brompton Cemetery.
