= St. Peter's Fiesta =

American festival honoring St. Peter, the patron saint of fishermen

Coordinates: 42.611°N 70.665°W

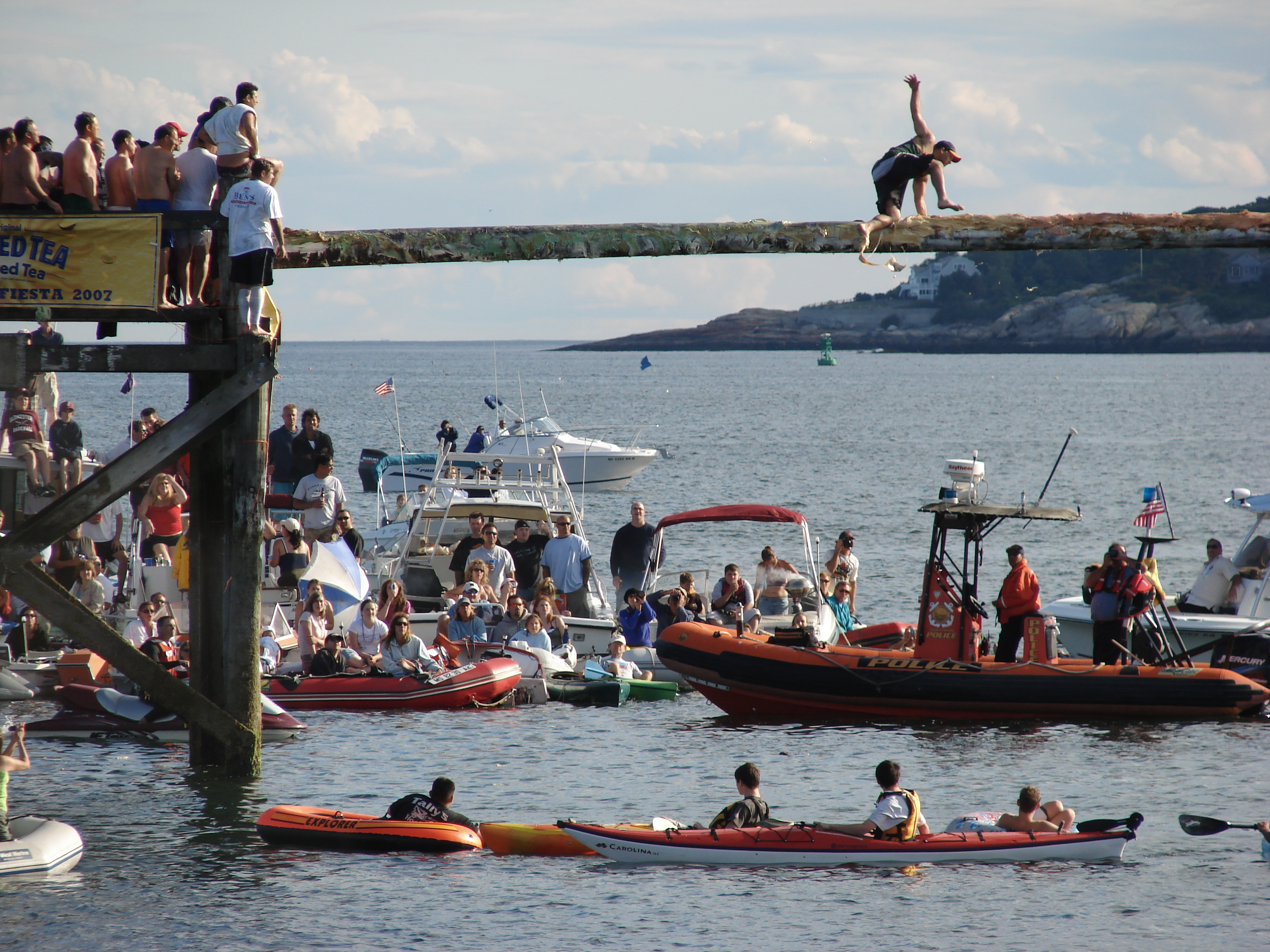
A man attempts to reach the flag during the Greasy Pole contest on Sunday, July 1, 2007.

St. Peter's Fiesta is a five-day festival honoring the patron saint of the fisherman, St. Peter. Hosted by the Italian American community of Gloucester, Massachusetts, the festival involves a carnival, seine boat races, and the Greasy Pole contest, and attracts people from all over.

== History ==
The festival began in 1927 when a life-sized statue of St. Peter was enshrined by fishermen in the heart of Gloucester's Italian district. The fishermen and their families began to pray to their patron saint, and soon plans for a religious procession on June 29 came about. They grew into the festival it is today.

No festival was held from 1942–45, nor in 2020–21.

== Greasy Pole contest ==
The Greasy Pole is a three-day competition where people, commonly males, attempt to cross a 40-foot wooden piling that is extended horizontally 30 feet above the cold water of the harbor. The pole is covered in bacon fat, Crisco, fish guts, and lard from local restaurants, and each contestant must try to retrieve the red flag attached at the end. The winner is carried through the streets of Gloucester and can drink for free at each public house stop along the route.

=== The 2011 Greasy Pole Fall Classic ===
To help raise some of the money needed to replace the greasy pole platform that was damaged by tropical storm Irene, the Saint Peter's Fiesta Committee hosted the 2011 Greasy Pole Fall Classic at Gloucester High School's Newell Stadium. The competition featured three greasy poles, designated bronze, silver, and gold. This was expected to be the only Fall Classic, as the Greasy Pole is to be replaced with a platform that will last a century. The two time champ Joe DaSilva is the first person to ever win on sea and land, which earned him the nickname "Surf and Turf Champion." In 2012 Nick Avelis won Saturday's pole, and in 2013 Kyle Barry won Friday's pole, making all three "turf" champions "surf" champions as well (Avelis also won 2013 Sunday).

=== In film ===
In 2009, CoffeeBlack Productions — the Gloucester filmmaking team of Emile Doucette, Thomas Papows, and Michael Pallazola – created a short 7-minute documentary about the Greasy Pole and its cultural significance in the small fishing community of Gloucester, Massachusetts. The film won the Documentary Educational Resources Award at the International Documentary Challenge at the Hot Docs Canadian International Documentary Film Festival. The group has plans to make a feature-length version of the film due out in 2010.

WBZ-TV released an hourlong documentary about the Greasy Pole in 2023, entitled Love and Grease.

In the Family Guy episode titled, Snap(ple), Peter decides to participate in the fictional version of the Greasy Pole titled "St. Philip's Greasy Pole Contest". Peter describes the contest as "Where shirtless men try to climb across a greasy pole". This episode aired on November 26, 2023.
