= John Van Arsdale =

American Revolutionary soldier (1756–1836)

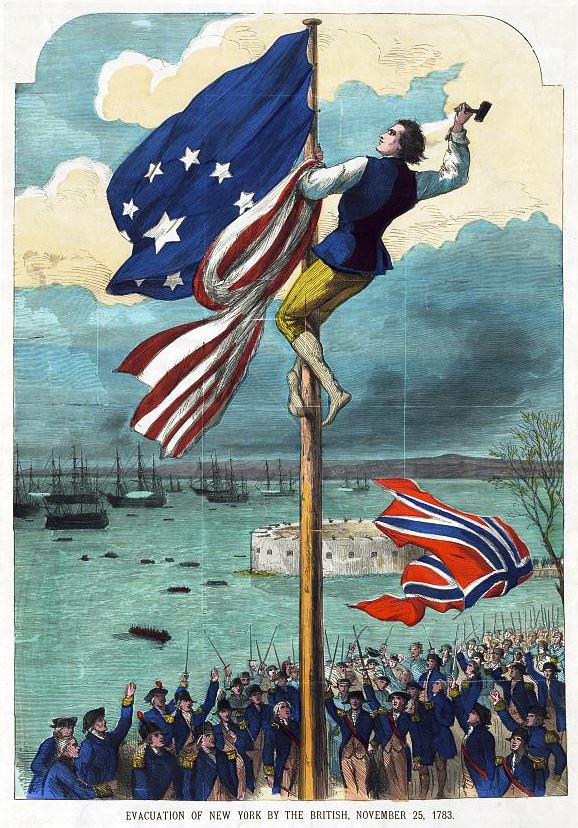
John Van Arsdale on Evacuation Day raising the American flag at Fort George

John Jacob Van Arsdale (1756 – 1836) was an American Revolutionary War soldier, noted for his legendary participation in the Evacuation Day flag-raising in 1783. From Cornwall, New York, he participated in Benedict Arnold's expedition to Quebec and the unsuccessful Battle of Quebec in 1775. He was later captured in the defensive Battle of Forts Clinton and Montgomery in 1777 and was detained by the British for nine and one-half months, including two months in the sugar house prisons, before being released in a prisoner exchange.

On November 25, 1783, later known as Evacuation Day, he is said to have gamely climbed a greasy flagpole left by the British at Fort George as they departed the city, to remove their standard and replace it with the American flag. The flag-raising story only appears after the fact though, and many accounts that include a climber describe a man a decade younger than Van Arsdale actually was at that point. He and his descendants, such as John Lafayette Riker, are associated with later annual commemorations. Labor leader Harry Van Arsdale Jr. is also among his descendants.
