= 62nd New York Infantry Regiment =

- New York state flag
- Active: June 30, 1861, to 1865
- Country: United States
- Allegiance: Union
- Branch: Union Army
- Role: Infantry
- Size: Regiment
- Nickname: Anderson Zouaves
- Engagements: American Civil War: First Battle of Bull Run; Battle of Gettysburg; Battle of Bristoe Station; Battle of the Wilderness; Siege of Petersburg; First Battle of Deep Bottom

Commanders
- Notable commanders: Frederick George D'Utassy; Daniel Woodall; Augustus Funk; Colonel Theodore B Hamilton

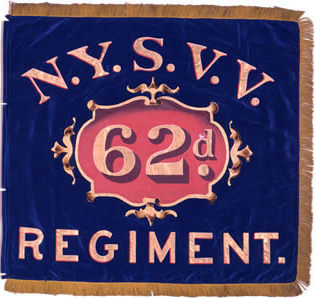
62nd Regiment, New York Volunteer Infantry Flank Marker

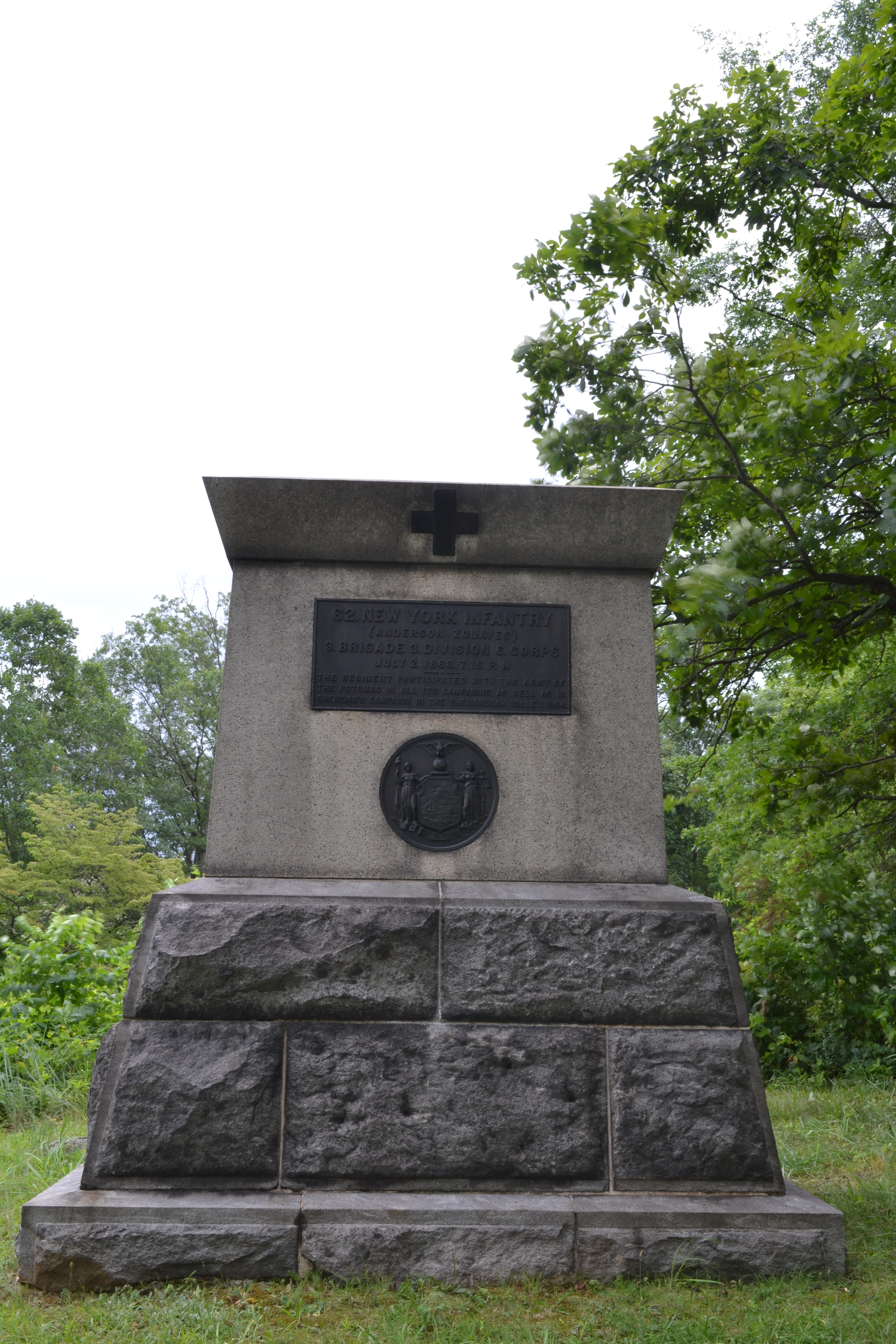
Monument to the 62nd New York Volunteer Infantry at Gettysburg

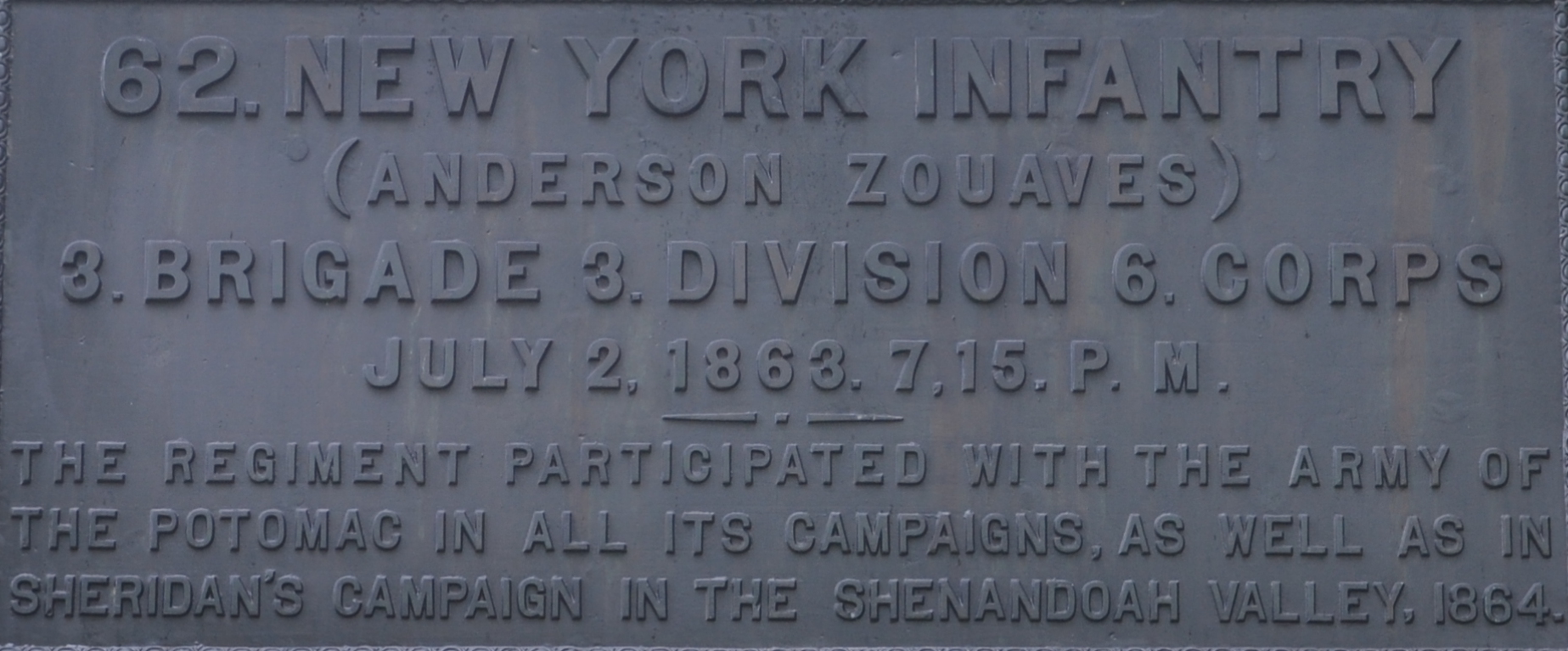
Dedication plate

The 62nd New York Infantry Regiment was an infantry regiment that served in the Union Army during the American Civil War. It is also known as the Anderson Zouaves.

== Organization ==
It was raised under special authority of the War Department in New York City by Col. John Lafayette Riker in May and June 1861, in response to President Abraham Lincoln's call for 75,000 volunteers to suppress the insurrection in the rebellious Southern states of the United States of America. The regiment was named in honor of, and raised under the auspices of, Major Robert Anderson, "the hero of Fort Sumter". The regiment was later numerically designated the Sixty-second New York State Volunteers.

The regiment was mustered in at Saltersville (now part of Bayonne), New Jersey on June 30 and July 1, 1861.

== Service ==
The regiment left New York from its Camp Astor on Rikers Island on August 21, 1861. The regiment embarked upon the steamer Kill Van Kull by which the men and the camp equipment were transported the Elizabethport New Jersey, from where the regiment was transported to Washington, D.C. by the Central Railroad of New Jersey. The regiment arrived in Baltimore at 9am the next morning where they disembarked in order to change trains. On their march through the town the regiment was cheered by the crowd. By 1pm the regiment and its equipment had been transferred to the carriages at the south bound depot and by late that day the regiment arrived in Washington.

On August 23, the Anderson Zouaves marched through Washington and on to Meridian Hill where they were reviewed the next day by William H. Seward. On September 13, 1861, the regiment was brigaded with the 6th New Jersey, the 55th New York, a.k.a. the Gardes Lafayette and the 102nd Pennsylvania Infantry Regiment (the Old 13th Pittsburgh Washington Infantry), under the command of General John J. Peck.

On September 26, the regiment broke camp in abeyance to an order received the previous evening and marched two or three miles to the village of Kalorama on Rock Creek, where, on the rocky, sloping ground of Swartz' Farm the brigade established Camp Holt.

After two weeks in this location, October 9, 1861, the Anderson Zouaves along with the rest of Peck's brigade was moved to Tennallytown where it replaced McCall's Division of the Pennsylvania Reserves, which had crossed the Chain Bridge into Virginia the day previous.

On October 1, 1861, while at Camp Tennally, the regiment's Lieutenant Colonel, William S. Tisdale, was discharged due to disability and was replaced by David J. Nevin, the captain of company "D".

The Anderson Zouaves spent the winter in camp at Tennallytown, until it took part in the Advance on Manassas on March 10, 1862. The regiment marched to Prospect Hill where it lay for three days, before returning to its old camp at Tennallytown.

On March 26, the regiment deployed to McClellan's Peninsula Campaign aboard transports at Georgetown harbor.

On December 27, 1862 Captain Theodore B. Hamilton, was discharged from the 33rd New York Infantry Regiment for promotion and appointed Lieutenant Colonel of the 62nd New York Infantry. Contemporary reports in the New York Daily Herald (January 1, 1863) and Buffalo Daily Republic (January 3, 1863) stated that the appointment was made “for marked gallantry in the field.”

The Anderson Zouaves fought at Gettysburg. At the Battle of Gettysburg, the 62nd New York served in the Third Brigade, Third Division, VI Corps. On the evening of July 2, 1863, the regiment, under the command of Lieutenant Colonel Theodore B. Hamilton, charged Confederate forces and recaptured two guns. The regiment's monument at Gettysburg marks the site of the action.

Today there is a monument in Gettysburg which reads;"On the site of this monument the Regiment under command of Lieut. Col. T. B. Hamilton charged the enemy and recaptured two guns."

The regiment was mustered out at Fort Schuyler, New York Harbor, on August 30, 1865. It lost during its term of service 3 officers and 85 enlisted men killed and mortally wounded, and 2 officers and 82 enlisted men by disease; total 172.

Three members of the regiment were awarded the Medal of Honor: Edward Brown, Jr., James R. Evans and Charles. E. Morse.

== Uniform ==
The regiment was a Zouave regiment and its uniform was of that style. They wore a red wool fez with gold trim and blue tassell. A dark blue zouave jacket trimmed in red with same color vest with red trim. A light blue sash was worn under the waist-belt. Red pantaloons with leather and canvas gaiters completed the uniform. (Note: Per Troiani's research, some of the British Crimean and Indian Mutiny veterans wore their British army medals with their uniform.)

== See also ==
- List of New York Civil War regiments
