= Bath National Cemetery =

Veterans cemetery in Steuben County, New York

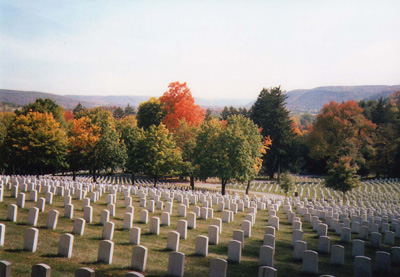
- Landscape of Bath National Cemetery
- Interactive map of Bath National Cemetery

Details
- Established: 1879
- Location: Bath, New York
- Country: United States
- Coordinates: 42.3488156°N 77.3511014°W
- Type: Public
- Owned by: Department of Veterans Affairs
- Size: 28.9 acres (117,000 m^{2})
- No. of graves: >17,500
- Website: http://www.cem.va.gov/CEMs/nchp/bath.asp
- Find a Grave: Bath National Cemetery

Bath National Cemetery is a United States National Cemetery located in the town of Bath, in Steuben County, New York. It encompasses 28.9 acres (117,000 m^{2}), and as of the end of 2005, had 13,048 interments.

== History ==
The area was originally part of the New York State Soldiers and Sailors Home, which was established in 1877; the cemetery was officially dedicated in on December 25, 1879. In 1930, it became part of the National Cemetery system.

In 1987, archaeologists digging in Fort Erie discovered the remains of 28 American soldiers who died at the time of the Niagara campaign during the War of 1812. They were reinterred in Bath National Cemetery.

== Notable monuments ==
- A 40-foot (12 m) high granite "Preservation of the Union Monument" which was dedicated to Civil War soldiers, erected in 1892. Its benefactor was Samuel Dietz.
- The "1812 monument" marks the burial place of the 28 soldiers from the War of 1812 who were reinterred at the cemetery.

== Notable interments ==
- Captain William James Aylward war artist.
- Private George Brinski, Civil War substitute for future president Grover Cleveland.
- Corporal George M. Grueb, Medal of Honor recipient for action at the Battle of Chaffin's Farm.
- Sergeant John Kiggins, Medal of Honor recipient for action at the Battle of Lookout Mountain.
- Private George Ladd, Medal of Honor recipient for action at the Battle of Waynesboro, Virginia.
- Sergeant Charles E. Morse, Medal of Honor recipient for action at the Battle of the Wilderness.
- Private Robert Knox Sneden, parts of his 5,000 page memoir and numerous drawings during his service in the Civil War were published in Eye of the Storm: A Civil War Odyssey.
- Seaman James Roberts, Medal of Honor recipient for action at the First Battle of Fort Fisher.

== See also ==
- United States Department of Veterans Affairs
- Old soldiers' home
