= Glenn Reiners =

American racing driver (born 1928)

- Born: February 9, 1928 Penn Yan, New York
- Died: November 8, 1994 (aged 66)
- Retired: 1960

Modified racing career
- Debut season: 1953
- Car number: 194
- Championships: 8

Glenn Reiners (February 9, 1928 – November 11, 1994) was a pioneering American dirt modified racing driver. In 1958, he won 13 of the 20 feature races held at Dundee Speedway, New York.

== Racing career ==
Reiners started his racing career as crew member on a car racing at Naples Speedway and later that year he drove in his first race a half-hour down the road at the speedway in Bath, New York. From there, Reiners stretched out his base of travel, adding the Friday night at Dundee and Saturday night at the Maple Grove Speedway in Waterloo, New York. He eventually captured three points championships at the former and claimed five titles at the later.

Reiners also competed successfully at other Central New York venues, including the Canandaigua Speedway, Chemung Speedrome, Hornell Raceway, Monroe County Fairgrounds, South Seneca Speedway in Ovid, Watertown Speedway, and Weedsport Speedway.

In 1960, after a bad crash at Maple Grove caused a serious head injury, Reiners retired from the driver's seat. He was inducted into the Northeast Dirt Modified Hall of Fame in 2006.
