= William James Aylward =

American war artist (1875–1956)

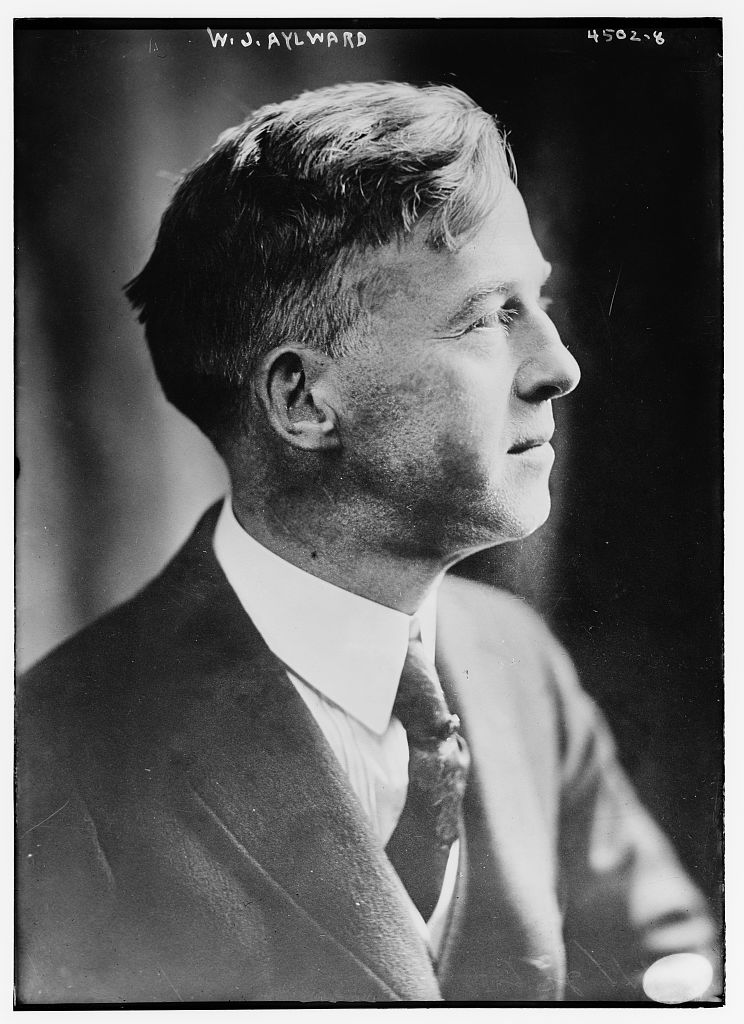
- Aylward in 1918
- Born: William James Aylward; September 5, 1875; Milwaukee, Wisconsin, US
- Died: February 26, 1956 (aged 80); Bath, New York
- Resting place: Bath, New York
- Education: Student of Howard Pyle
- Known for: Illustration

William James Aylward (September 5, 1875 – February 26, 1956) was an artist and illustrator who specialized in maritime themes for books and stories. He was also a war artist for the United States Army during World War I.

== Biography ==
Aylward was born September 5, 1875, in Milwaukee, Wisconsin and developed an early interest in things nautical because his father built and owned Great Lakes ships. Much of the work from his early career reflects that influence. He studied art at the Art Institute of Chicago, at the Art Students' League in New York City. He later studied with several artists in Europe. Like some of the other future official World War I combat artists, he studied with the famous illustrator and teacher, Howard Pyle.

Aylward began his professional career by writing and illustrating 18th century marine history for magazines such as Harper's Monthly, The Century, and Scribner's. His artwork also appeared in illustrated editions of Jules Verne's Twenty Thousand Leagues Under the Seas and Jack London's The Sea-Wolf. He combined his interest in the sea and his abilities as an illustrator to produce advertisements featuring nautical themes. In addition to his proficiency as an illustrator, Aylward was an award-winning artist and received a number of prestigious prizes such as the Salmagundi Club's Shaw Purchase Prize in 1911 and the Philadelphia Watercolor Club's Beck Prize in 1912, and the Salmagundi Prize for Illustration in 1914.

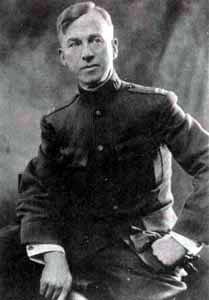
Aylward in 1917

During the war Aylward concentrated his efforts on recording the activities of the ports and transportation systems developed to support industrial warfare. Some of his best wartime work was done at the port of Marseilles after the armistice when he had the time to paint in some detail.

Following the war, he exhibited at the Paris Salon in 1924 and the National Academy of Design in 1925. Aylward returned to commercial illustration in the later half of the 1920s and owned a freelance studio in Hempstead, New York. He continued illustrating through the mid-1940s. He died February 26, 1956, and is buried in Bath National Cemetery, Bath, New York.

== World War I Paintings ==
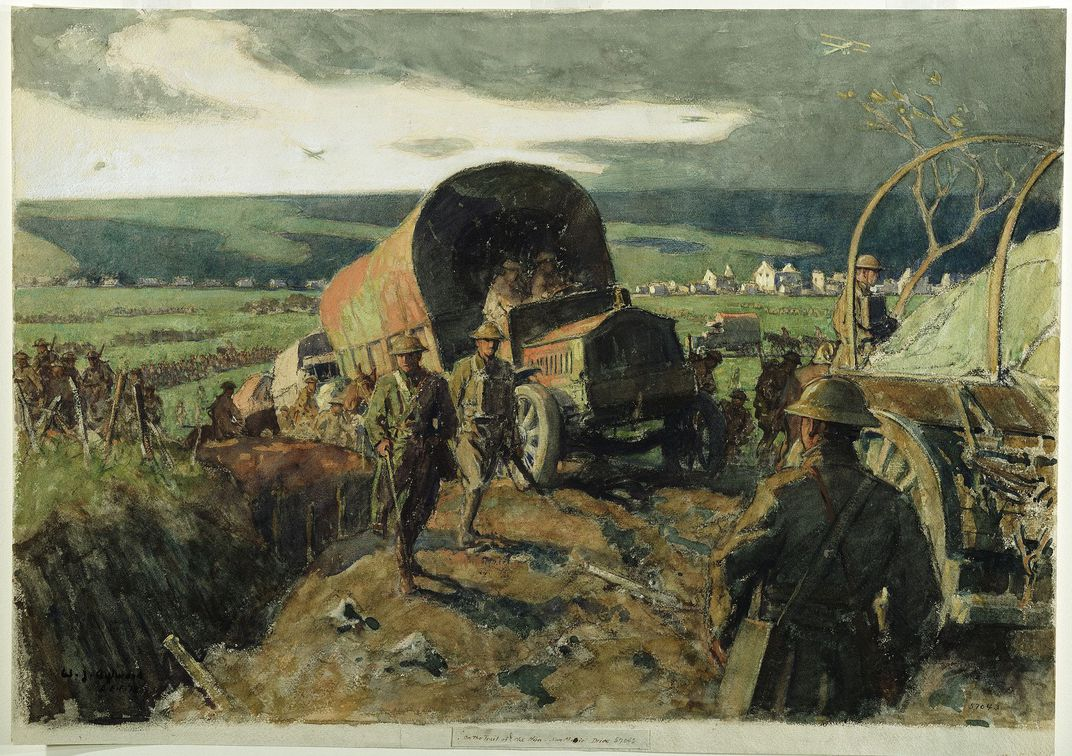
World War I Doughboys and US Army trucks on the move.

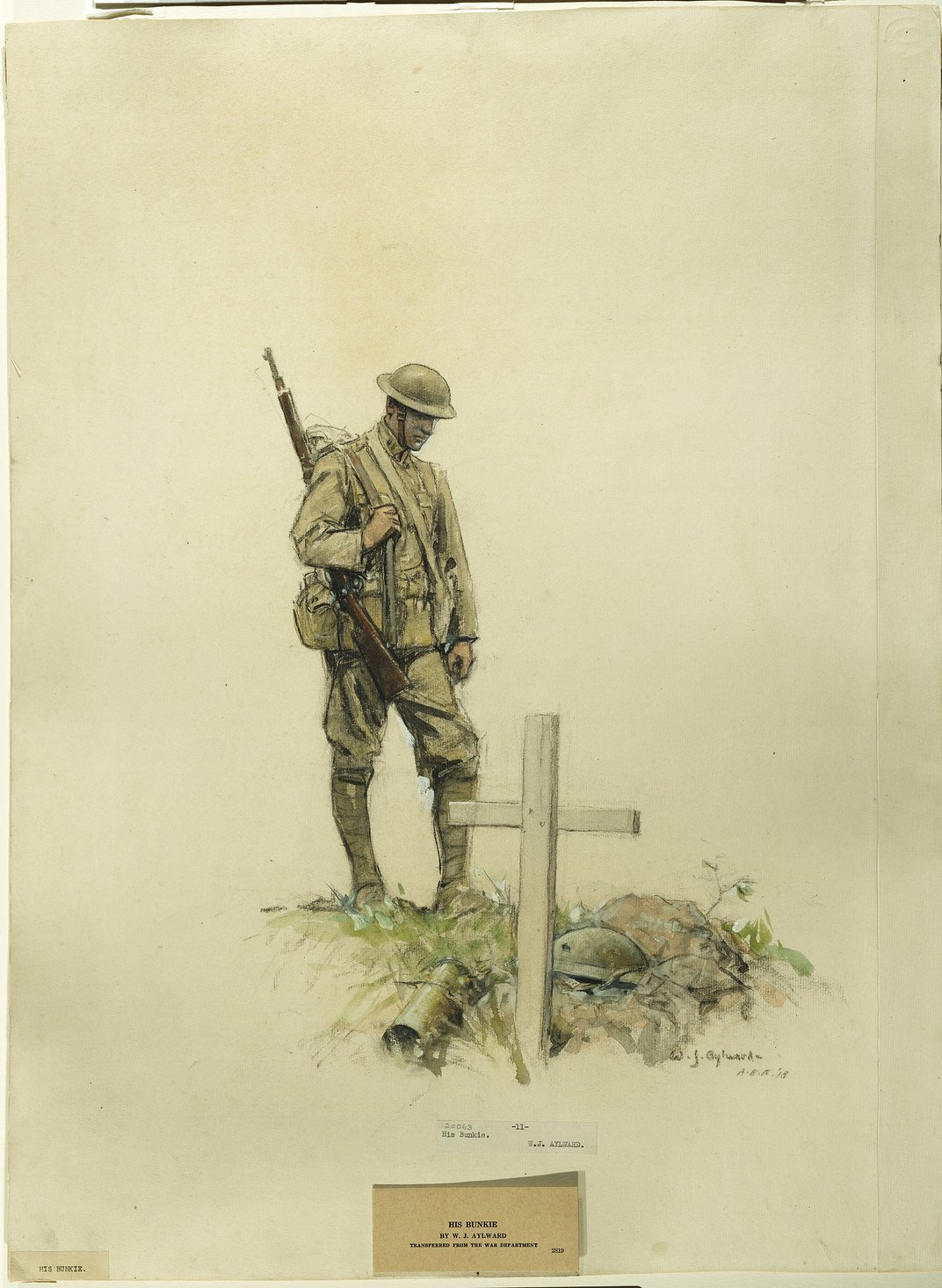
World War I doughboy looking at the grave of a fallen comrade.

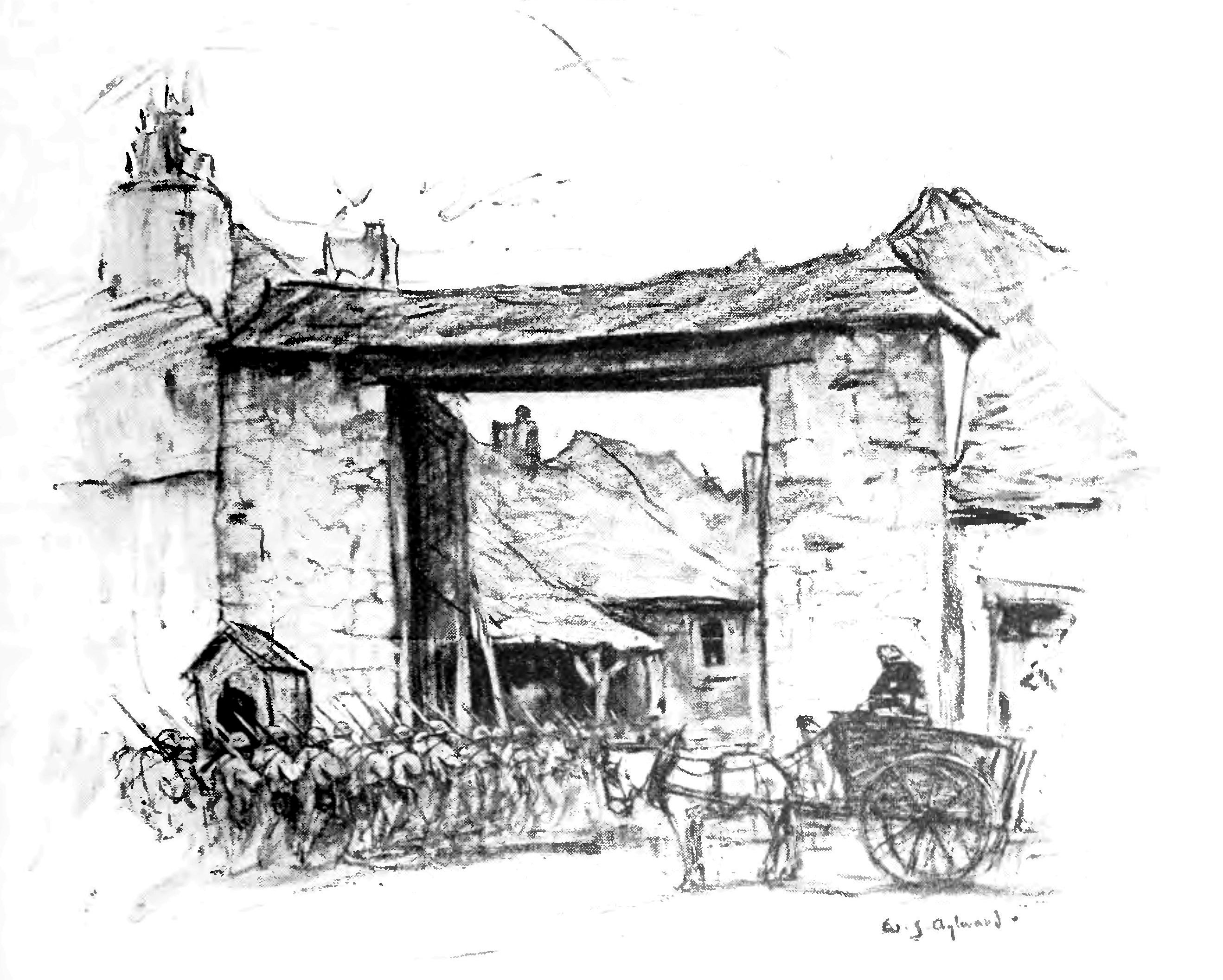

== Maritime Art ==
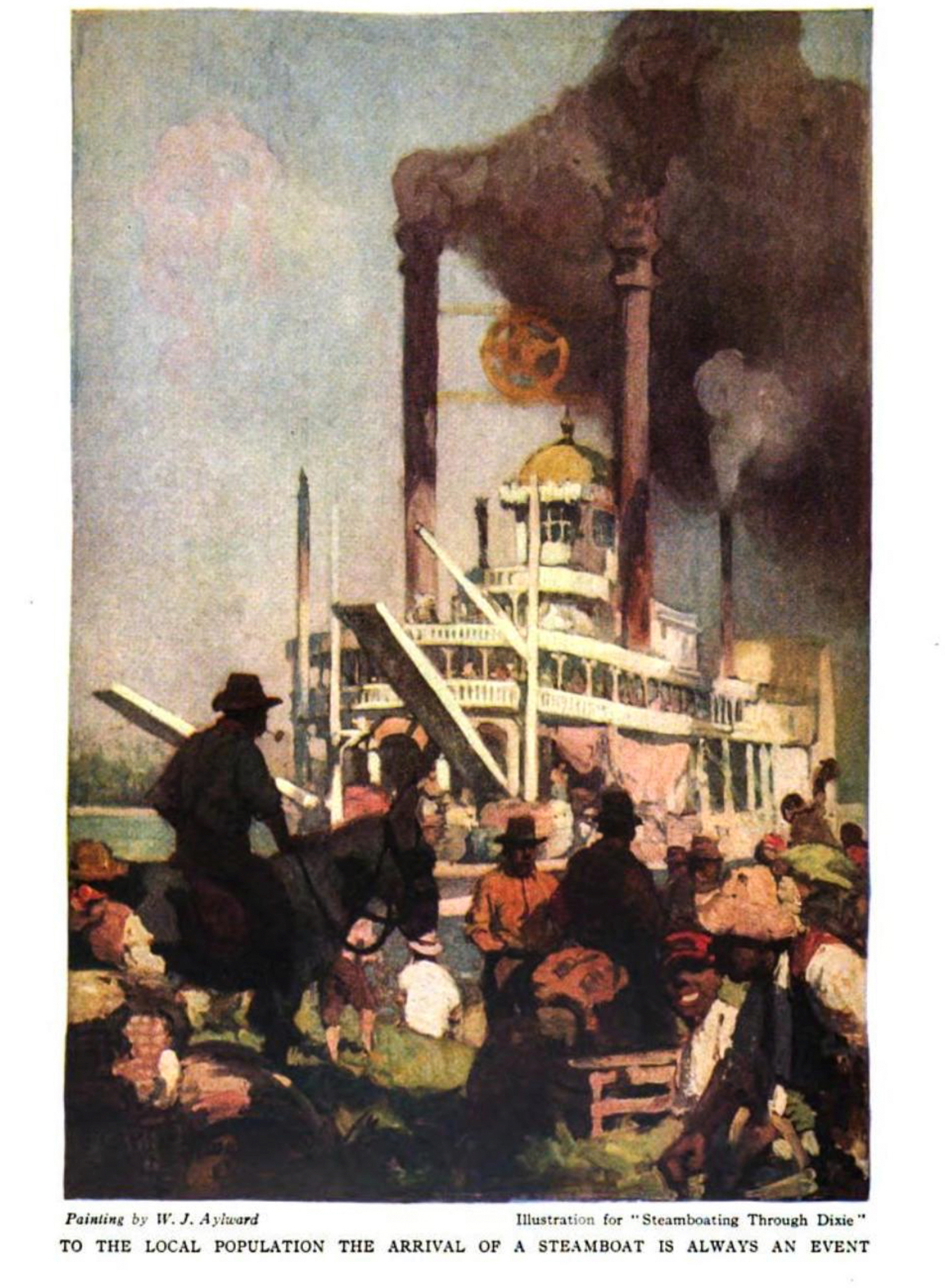
Steamboat At the Levee

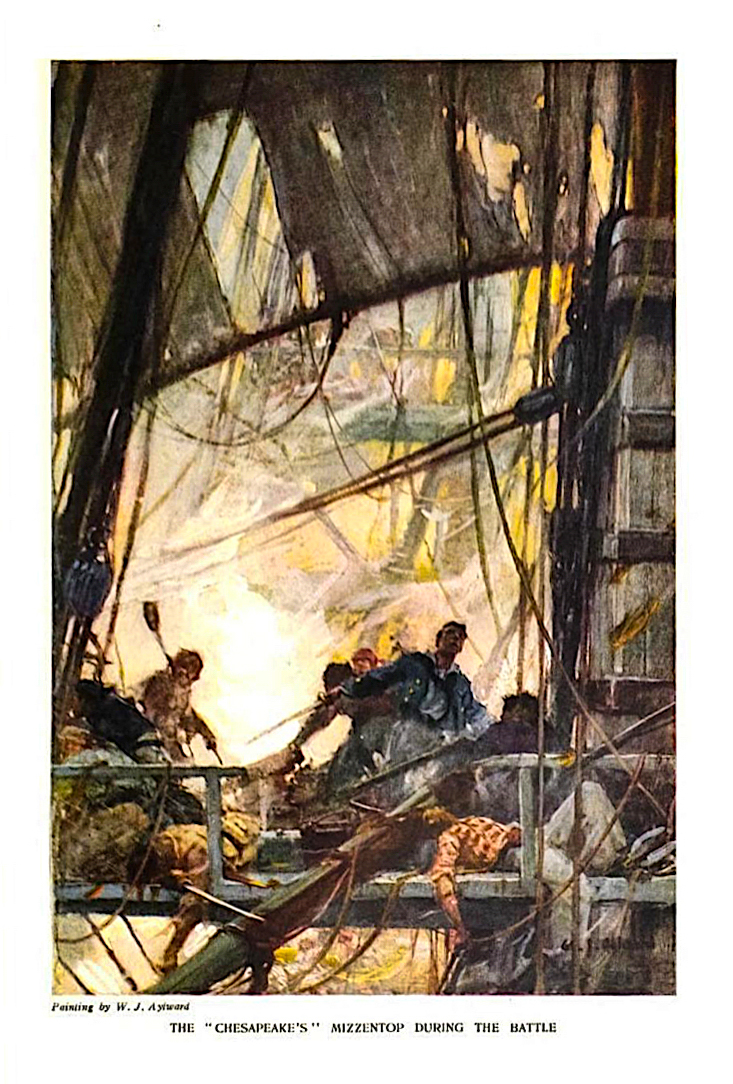
The "Chesapeake"

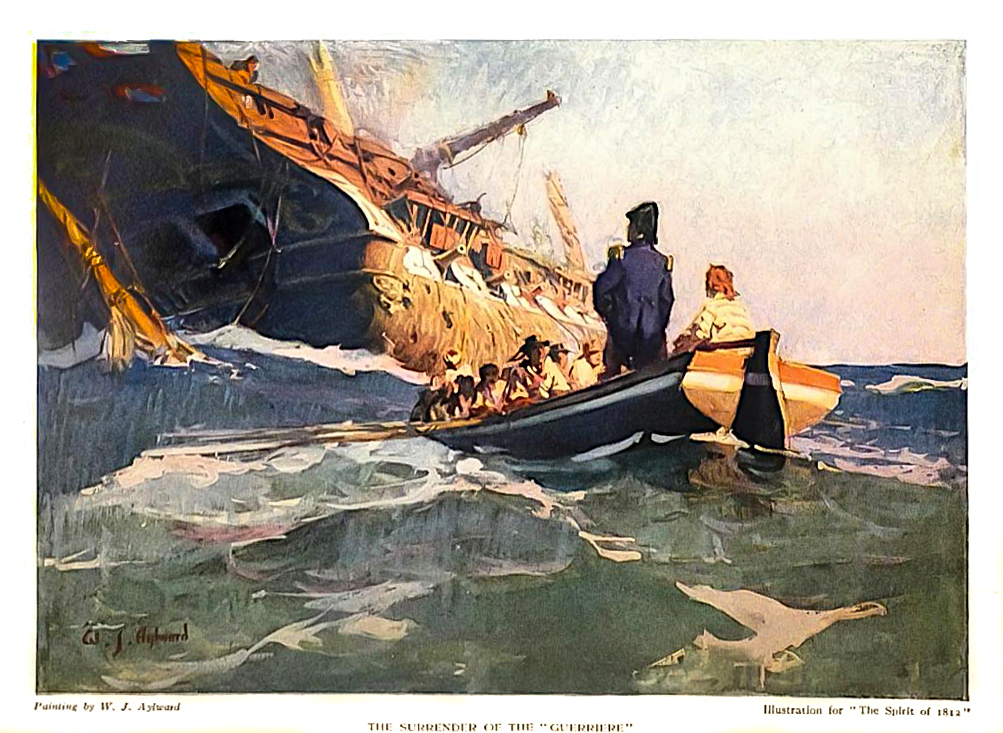
Spirit of 1812

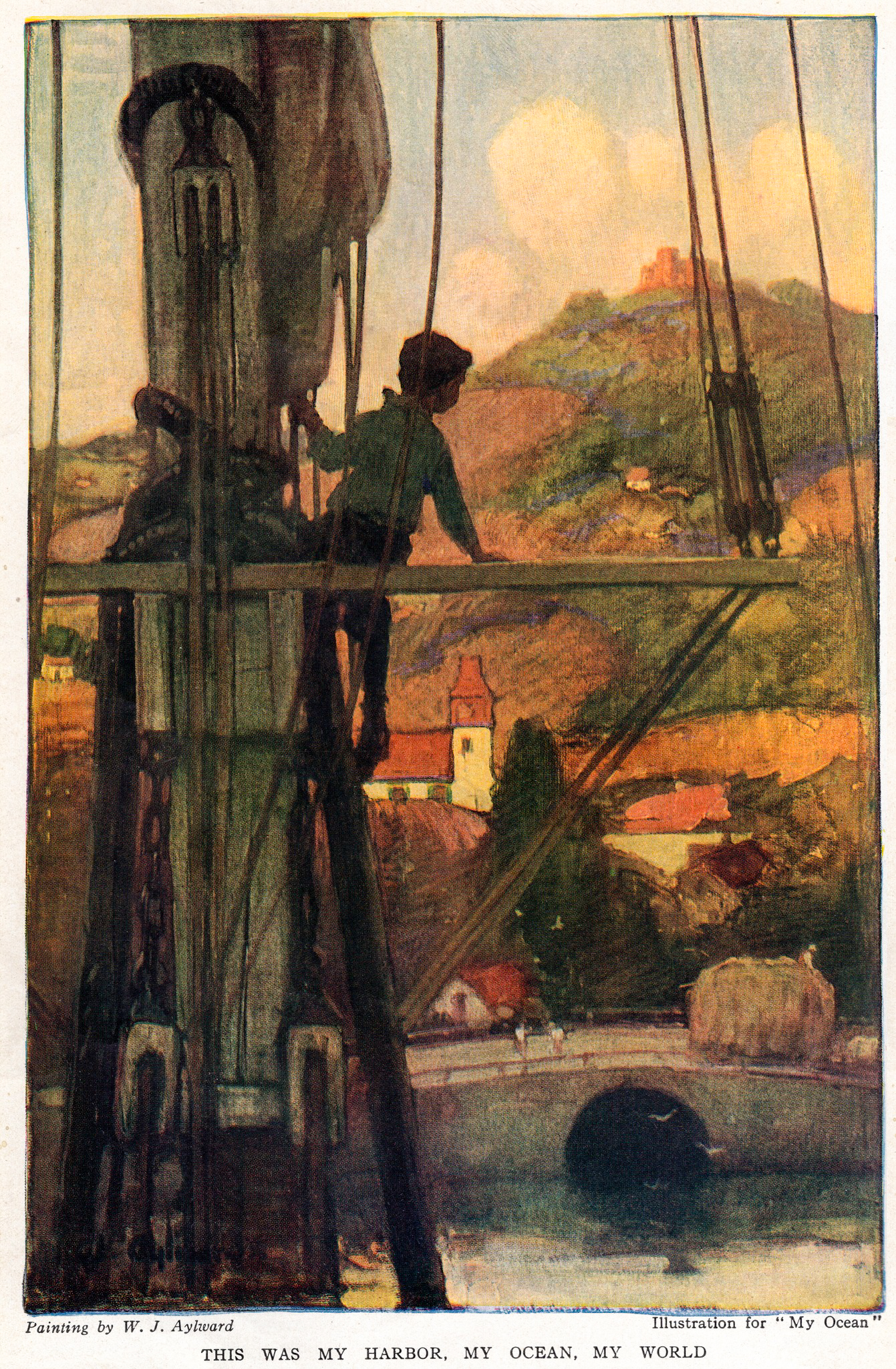
My Ocean, My Harbor, My World

== See also ==
- United States Army Art Program
