= Bath Speedway =

Defunct auto racing venue in Bath, New York

- Location: Bath, New York
- Coordinates: 42.3614°N 77.3538°W
- Opened: 1951
- Closed: 1956
- Surface: Dirt
- Length: .4 km (0.25 mi)

Bath Speedway was a 1/4-mile (0.40 km) dirt oval racing facility located in the Southern Tier Region of New York State.

== Overview ==
Bath Speedway was opened in 1952 on NY 415 two miles northwest of the village of Bath, New York (property later occupied by Empire Livestock Marketing LLC). The Cohocton Valley Racing Association took over operations in 1956, then moved to the Dundee Fairgrounds the following year.

The speedway was one of a series of venues in the Twin Tiers region of New York and Pennsylvania where drivers began their careers before becoming known on the state and national scene. The racetrack was where Hall of Fame driver Glenn Reiners ran his first race, and was the home track of fellow Hall of Famer and NASCAR New York Sportsman champion Dutch Hoag.
