= George Brinski =

Polish immigrant who substituted for Grover Cleveland in the American Civil war

- Born: 1822; Poland
- Died: August 19, 1887 (aged 64–65); Bath Soldiers' and Sailors' Home, New York, US
- Burial place: Bath National Cemetery
- Military career
- Allegiance: United States
- Branch: Union Army
- Service years: 1863–1865
- Rank: Private
- Unit: 76th New York Infantry Regiment F Company
- Known for: Serving in the American Civil War as a substitute for future president Grover Cleveland
- Other work: Sailor

George Brinski (also spelled Benninsky, Brinske, and Beniski, born as Berrisker) was a Polish-American immigrant who served as a substitute in the American Civil War for Grover Cleveland, who would go on to serve as the president of the United States.

Brinski was born in 1822 in Poland and early on in his life became a sailor, eventually coming to the United States in 1851 aboard the SS Acme.

In 1863, Buffalo lawyer Grover Cleveland was called up by the Conscription Act of 1863, but rather than serving he hired George Brinski as a substitute for $150, an act which was legal at the time, although the Confederacy had actually outlawed the practice that same year, something the Union did not do until the passage of the Selective Service Act of 1917.

Cleveland came to know Brinski through one Captain George Reinhart of Buffalo Police Station 3, who accompanied the two of them to Fort Porter to serve as a witness.

Brinski joined the Company F of the 76th New York Infantry Regiment on August 5, 1863, and was sent to Riker's Island for training. He was later sent to Rappahannock, Virginia where he suffered an injury to his back as well as testicular torsion. After his own surgery, Brinski was assigned to be a handyman under surgeon John Billings until his discharge on August 11, 1865. He did not see combat.

Upon his discharge on August 11, 1865, George Brinski met with Grover Cleveland, who was at the time running for the office of Sheriff in Buffalo. Cleveland urged Brinski to take his discharge papers before a judge to gain citizenship.

In August 1885, Brinski claims to have gone to stay at the poorhouse in Buffalo Plains due to poor eyesight and a lung hemorrhage after allegedly meeting with now president Grover Cleveland and requesting assistance, reportedly being met with little sympathy. He claims to have stayed in the poorhouse until January 14, 1886.

Brinski eventually found his way to the Bath Soldiers' and Sailors' Home where he began sending letters to various newspapers claiming that Cleveland had promised to help him in any way he could if he was to survive the war, a portion of their agreement which Brinski felt he had been cheated out of. The story spread like wildfire and was used by critics to point out Cleveland's lack of sympathy for Civil War veterans as a whole.

On August 19, 1887, George Brinski died of consumption and was buried in the cemetery at Bath Soldiers' and Sailors Home.

== Sources ==
- Lachman, Charles (2011) A Secret Life: The lies and Scandals of President Grover Cleveland
- Mathews, James M. (1864). "Public Laws of the Confederate States of America, Passed at the Fourth Session of the First Congress; 1863-64." The statutes at large of the Confederate States of America. Richmond: R.M. Smith, Printer to Congress.
