= Charles E. Morse =

American Civil War soldier

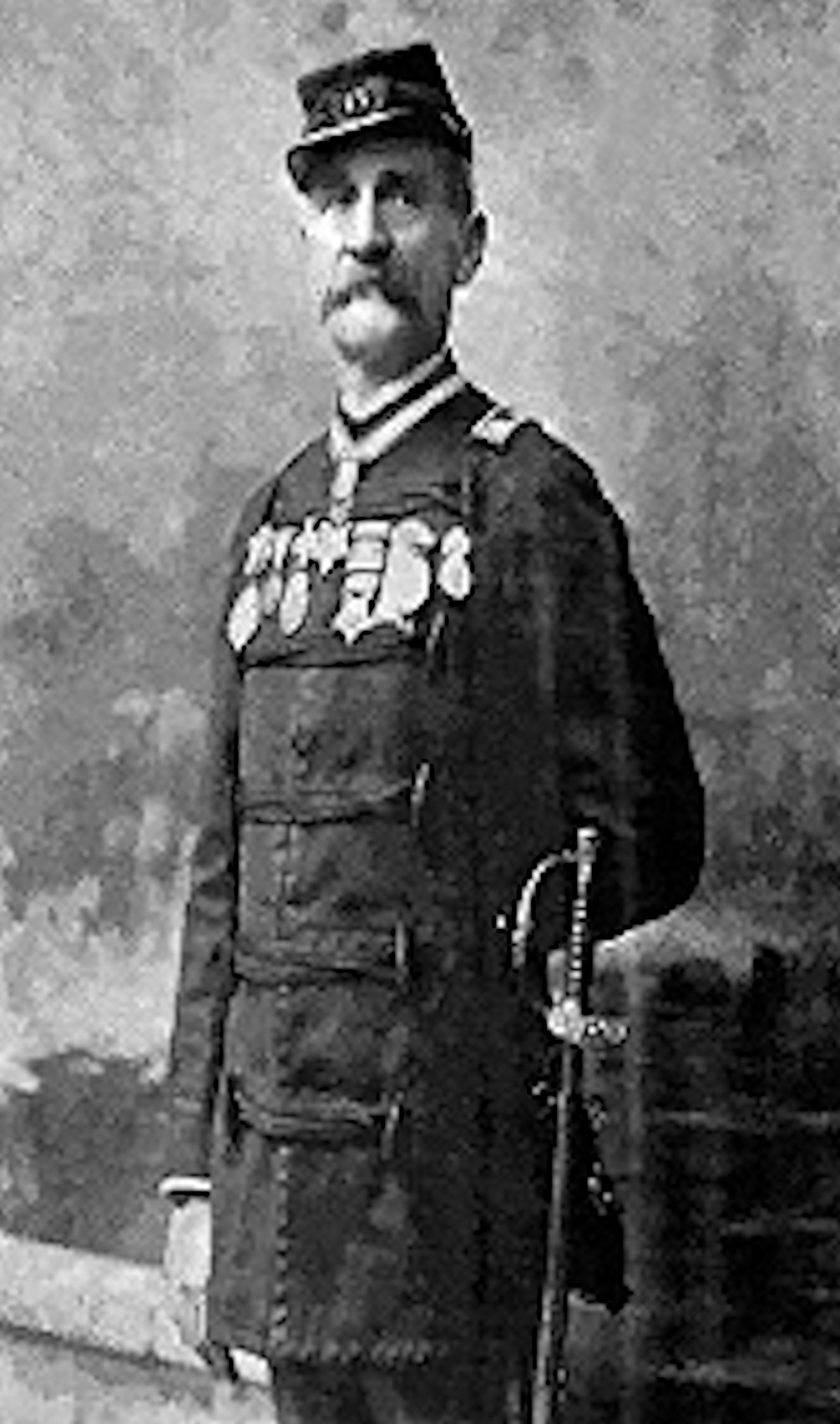
- Medal of Honor recipient
- Born: May 5, 1841; Marseille, France
- Died: August 31, 1920 (aged 79); Bath, New York, US
- Burial place: Bath National Cemetery
- Military career
- Allegiance: United States; Union
- Branch: United States Army; Union Army
- Service years: 1861–1864
- Rank: Sergeant
- Units: Company I, 62nd New York Volunteer Infantry Regiment
- Conflicts: American Civil War
- Awards: Medal of Honor

Charles E. Morse (May 5, 1841 – August 31, 1920) was an American Civil War soldier who received the Medal of Honor for his actions during The Battle of the Wilderness in that war.

== Biography ==
Born in Marseille, France, Morse was a sergeant in Company "I" of the 62nd New York State Volunteers (Anderson Zouaves) and was awarded his Medal of Honor on January 14, 1890, for gallantry at the Battle of the Wilderness, Virginia, on May 5, 1864.

Morse enlisted as a private in the Union Army on June 24, 1861, at New York City, and was mustered into Company "I" of the Anderson Zouaves Infantry Regiment (later the 62nd N. Y. S. V.) on June 30, 1861. He was promoted to corporal around the time that the regiment left New York for Washington on August 21, 1861, and was promoted sergeant on September 20.

Morse died at the age of 79 on August 31, 1920, in Bath, New York and he is buried at Bath National Cemetery. His grave can be found in section J, Row 24, Grave 4.

== Battle of the Wilderness ==
At the battle of Fair Oaks, May 31, 1862, Morse was wounded in the hand. On May 4, 1863, he was taken prisoner at the battle of Salem Church. He was exchanged and at the time of the Battle of the Wilderness, May 5, 1864, was in command of his company, which numbered only 15, there being no commissioned officers left.

On the day of the Battle of the Wilderness, Sgt. Morse, together with his company, held a position on the left center of the regiment next to the color guard. The action took place on the Orange Plank Road, west of its intersection with Brock Road, the 62nd regiment had been ordered to advance and charge the enemy. The enemy was forced back to its first line of defense and being given no time to rally was forced back to its second line. Here it made a stand and, by desperate fighting, prevented the 62nd New York's further advance.

The Confederates, now occupying a strong position, laid down a destructive fire on the 62nd. The regiment being pressed very hard was ordered to fall back on rifle pits. Despite falling back in perfect order the movement was interpreted by the enemy as a full retreat and started in pursuit. Despite the pursuit the regiment maintained its order continually loading and facing about to fire while it fell back.

The line had marched about 50 feet when it was about faced to fire a volley into the advancing enemy. It was at this time that it was noticed that John H. L. Gilmore, one of the regiment's color-sergeants had fallen mortally wounded with the colours. Gilmore had been struck by a ball and had fallen his body covering the flag.

It is reported that someone in the regiment shouted "The colors are down!" and Morse and Corporal Michael Ditzel of company "F" ran out from the line towards the wounded Gilmore and the advancing enemy. Morse was the first to arrive at the almost lifeless color-sergeant's side. Taking up the flag, Morse turned to make for his own line, however, an enemy officer, who had been making for the same position shot Morse in the knee with his revolver. Despite this both Morse and Ditzel made it back to their own lines where Morse remained with the regiment still bearing the flag until it was relieved.

Coincidentally May 5, the date the battle of the Wilderness took place, happened to be Morse's birthday.

Private James R. Evans of Company "H" of the same regiment also received the Medal of Honor for his actions on the same day to rescue the regimental flag.

== Battle Flags of the Anderson Zouaves ==
A Federal battle flag, a gift of Major Robert Anderson and made by Tiffany & Co., was presented to the regiment by Major Samuel Wylie Crawford on August 14, 1861, at Rikers Island, New York.

A Regimental battle flag, a gift of the Council of New York and made by the firm of George Brandon & John Styles was presented to the regiment by Brig. Gen. John J. Peck on May 8, 1862, on the Williamsburg battlefield.

== Medal of Honor citation ==

Rank and Organization:

Sergeant, Company I, 62d New York Infantry. Place and date: At Wilderness, Va., May 5, 1864. Entered service at: New York. Birth: France. Date of issue: January 14, 1890

Citation:

Voluntarily rushed back into the enemy's lines, took the colors from the color sergeant, who was mortally wounded, and, although himself wounded, carried them through the fight.

== See also ==
- List of Medal of Honor recipients
- List of American Civil War Medal of Honor recipients: M–P
