= James R. Evans =

American Civil War soldier and Medal of Honor recipient

- Born: September 12, 1843; New York City, New York
- Died: December 27, 1918 (aged 75); Caldwell, New Jersey
- Burial place: First Reformed Church Cemetery, Pompton Plains, Morris County, New Jersey
- Military career
- Allegiance: United States of America; Union
- Branch: United States Army; Union Army
- Service years: 1861 –1864
- Rank: Private
- Unit: (New York (state)) 62nd New York Volunteer Infantry Regiment
- Conflicts: American Civil War
- Awards: Medal of Honor

James Robert Evans (September 12, 1843 – December 27, 1918) was an American Civil War soldier and Medal of Honor recipient (date of issue: February 25, 1895).

== Biography ==
Evans was born in New York City on September 12, 1843. He died December 27, 1918, at Caldwell, New Jersey, and was buried at the First Reformed Church Cemetery, Pompton Plains, New Jersey.

== Civil War ==
A private in Company "H" of the 62nd New York State Volunteers (the Anderson Zouaves), Evans was awarded his Medal of Honor for gallantry at the Battle of the Wilderness, Virginia, on May 5, 1864.

Evans enlisted on June 30, 1861, at New York City as a musician. On July 3, 1861, he mustered into Company "F" of the Anderson Zouaves infantry regiment. On the same day, he was transferred from company "F" to company "H". He mustered out on June 29, 1864, at Petersburg, Virginia.

Sgt. Charles E. Morse of Company "I" of the same regiment also received the Medal of Honor for his actions on the same day to rescue the regimental flag from a "mortally wounded" color sergeant, John H. L. Gilmore.

== Medal of Honor citation ==
Rank and organization: Private, Company H, 62d New York Infantry. Place and date: At Wilderness, Va., May 5, 1864. Entered service at: New York, N.Y. Birth: New York, N.Y. Date of issue: February 25, 1895.

Citation:

Went out in front of the line under a fierce fire and, in the face of the rapidly advancing enemy, rescued the regimental flag with which the color bearer had fallen.

== See also ==
- List of Medal of Honor recipients
- List of American Civil War Medal of Honor recipients: A–F
