= Robert Knox Sneden =

American landscape painter and map-maker

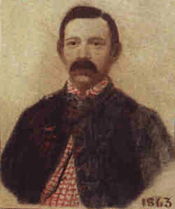
Robert Knox Sneden

Robert Knox Sneden (1832–1918) was an American landscape painter and a map-maker for the Union Army during the American Civil War. He was a prolific illustrator and memoirist documenting the war and other events.

== Early life ==
Robert Knox Sneden was born in Annapolis Royal, Nova Scotia, Canada and moved to New York City in 1851 at age 19. He received some architectural education.

== Civil War ==
Sneden left Brooklyn in 1861 to enlist in the 40th New York Volunteer Infantry Regiment, or the Mozart Regiment, of the Army of the Potomac. He served as a quartermaster when his regiment camped near Leesburg Turnpike. Starting from January 12, 1862, Sneden served on Samuel P. Heintzelman's III Corps staff, at first, as a draughtsman on map work, later, as a topographical engineer. On March 22, 1862, Sneden embarked with Heintzelman for the Peninsula Campaign, participating in the Battle of Williamsburg, Battle of Seven Pines, Battle of Savage's Station, and Battle of Glendale. Returning to Northern Virginia, he took part in the Second Battle of Bull Run. He was assigned to the defenses of Washington, D.C., first in Alexandria, Virginia, then at Arlington House.

In October, 1863, after the Battle of Bristoe Station, he was assigned to David B. Birney's division, participating in the Battle of Kelly's Ford.

He was assigned to the staff of general William H. French, during the abortive Battle of Mine Run.

== Prisoner-of-War ==
On November 27, 1863, Sneden was captured by Confederate rangers under John S. Mosby and became a prisoner of war for the next thirteen months. In November 1863, he was held at a tobacco warehouse next to Libby Prison, where he suffered from typhoid fever. On February 22, 1864, after a prison escape, prisoners were shipped to a new camp in Georgia. Sneden was placed in the notorious Andersonville Prison, but continued making clandestine drawings. Altogether, he sketched scenes of prison life in Savannah and Millen, Georgia, and in Florence and Charleston, South Carolina. On December 11, 1864, he was exchanged at Charleston.

== Later life ==
After the Civil war, although crippled from his time in Andersonville, Sneden returned to Brooklyn, where he was already declared dead or missing. He made a number of his war sketches into watercolors, leaving a legacy of close to 1000 watercolors, drawings, sketches, maps, and diagrams. Sneden contributed some of them to the Battles and Leaders of the Civil War, a series of articles published between 1884 and 1887 in The Century Magazine and then reissued as a four-volume set of books.

Sneden never married and devoted the rest of his life to preserving the Civil war memory. In 1918, Sneden died in New York State Soldiers' and Sailors' Home.

== Rediscovery ==
In 1994, an art dealer approached the Virginia Historical Society about a Civil War archive that had languished in a Connecticut bank vault. Robert Sneden's great-great-nephew also transferred through purchase Sneden's diary and watercolors - almost 5,000 pages of the diary entries and memoirs, and nearly 500 watercolors and maps.

In the fall of 2000, Sneden was rediscovered by the general public and Civil War enthusiasts after about 300 pieces of his artwork were displayed in the Virginia Historical Society's Eye of the Storm exhibition and accompanying book, Eye of the Storm: The Civil War Drawings of Robert Knox Sneden, which became a bestseller. According to the historical society, it was, "the largest collection of Civil War soldier art ever produced". Documentary-style images created by Sneden are regarded as important historical records.

Sneden's works are currently held by the Virginia Historical Society, and are also available through the Library of Congress.

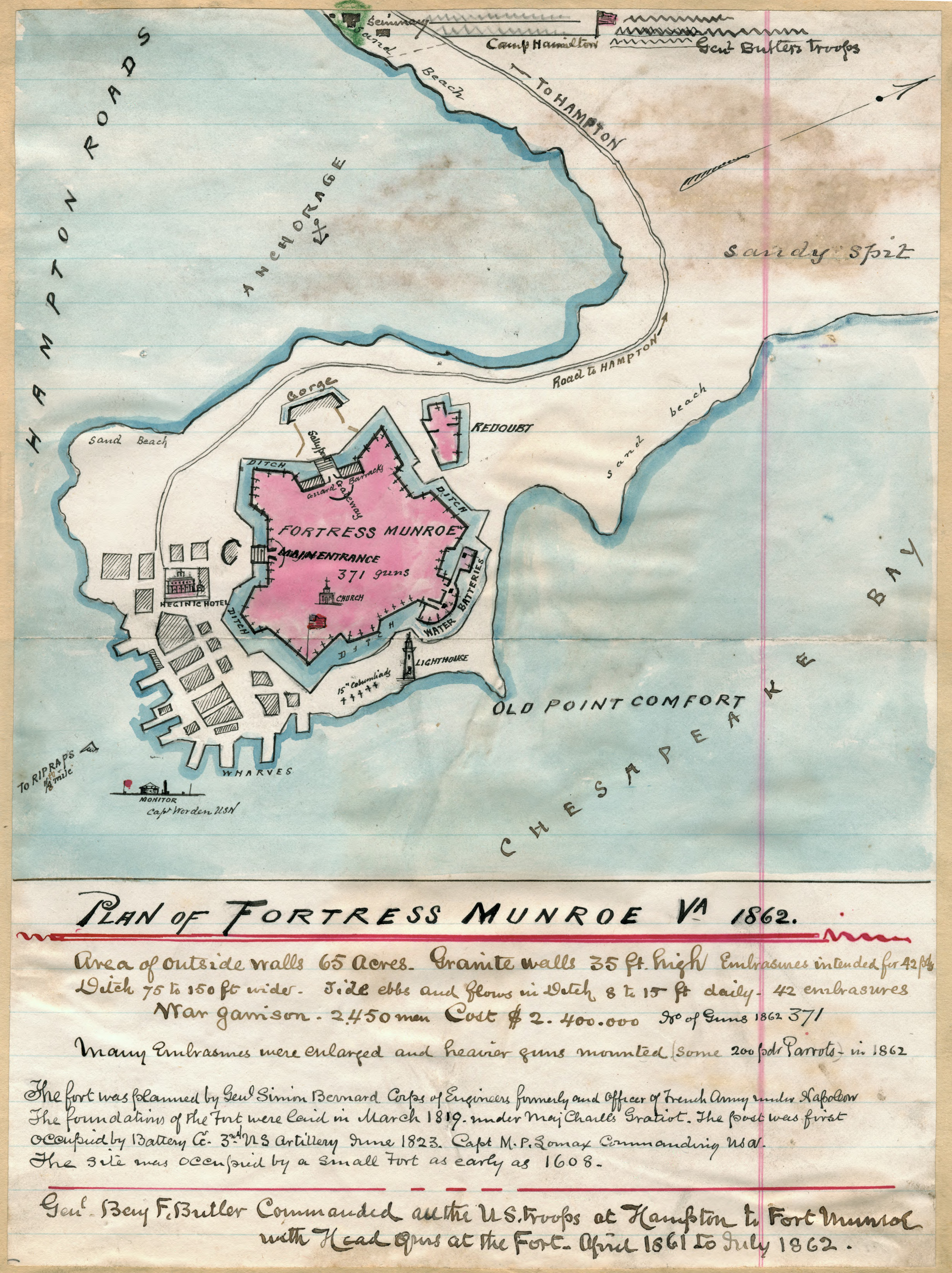
Fort Monroe, 1865

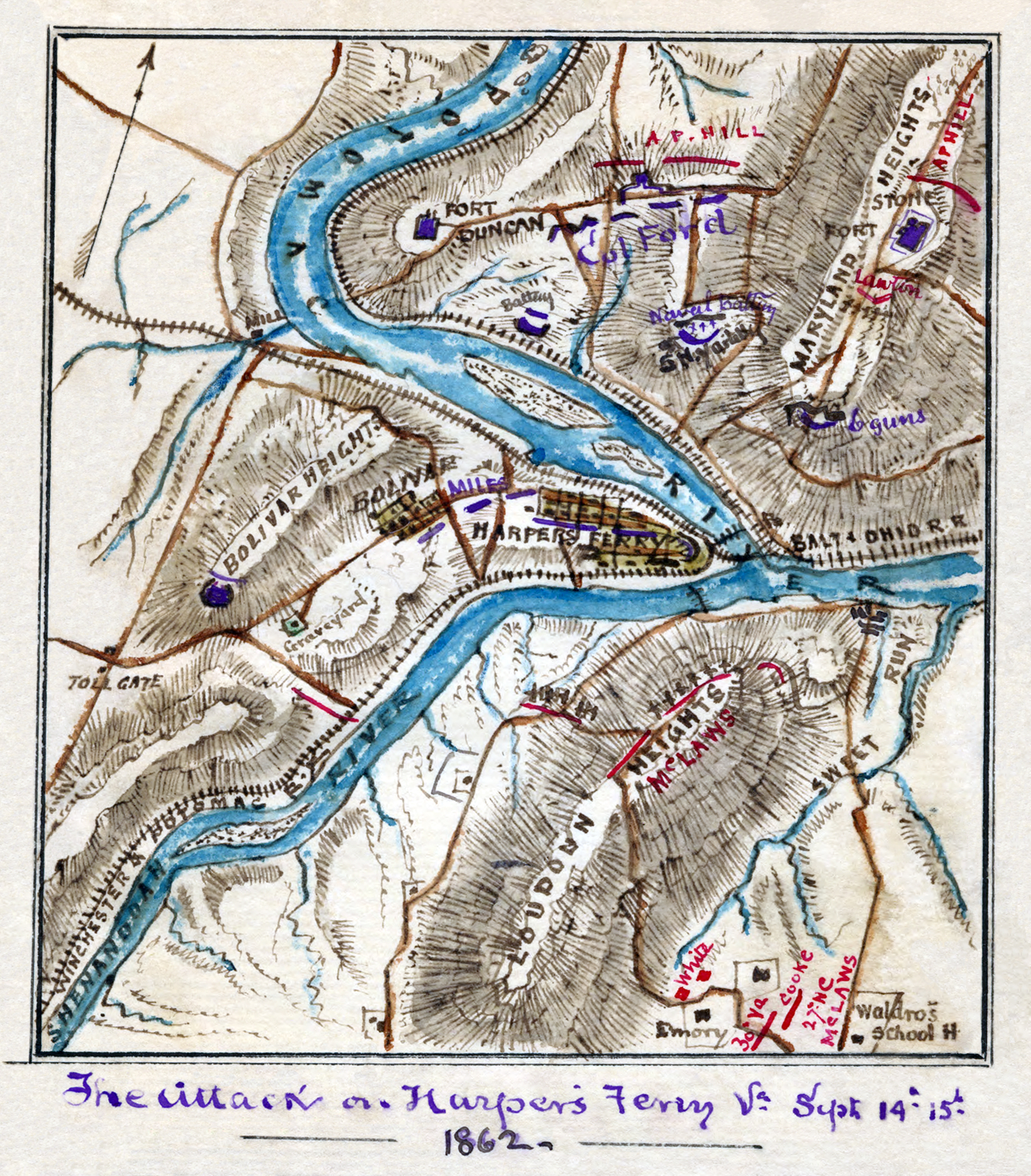
A restored version of Sneden's map for the Battle of Harpers Ferry

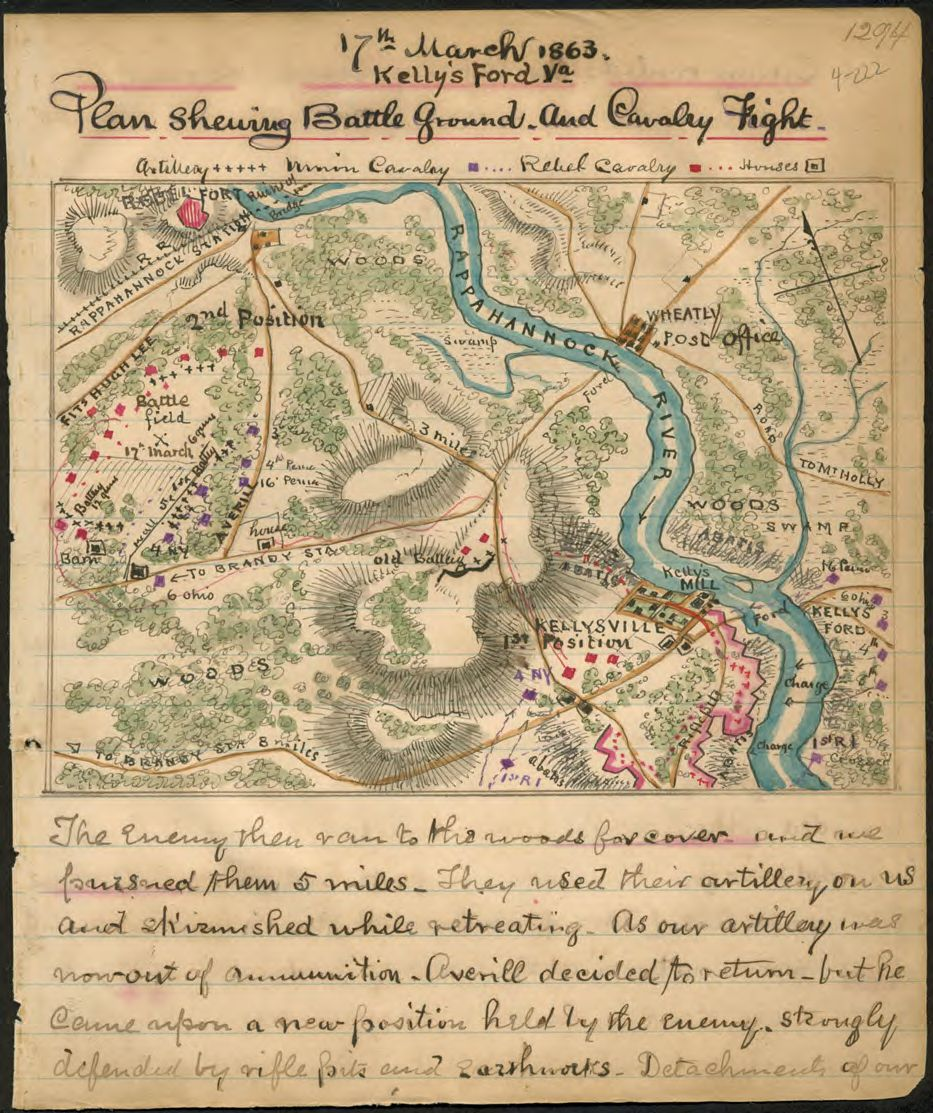
Map showing a battle ground at Kelly's Ford, Virginia

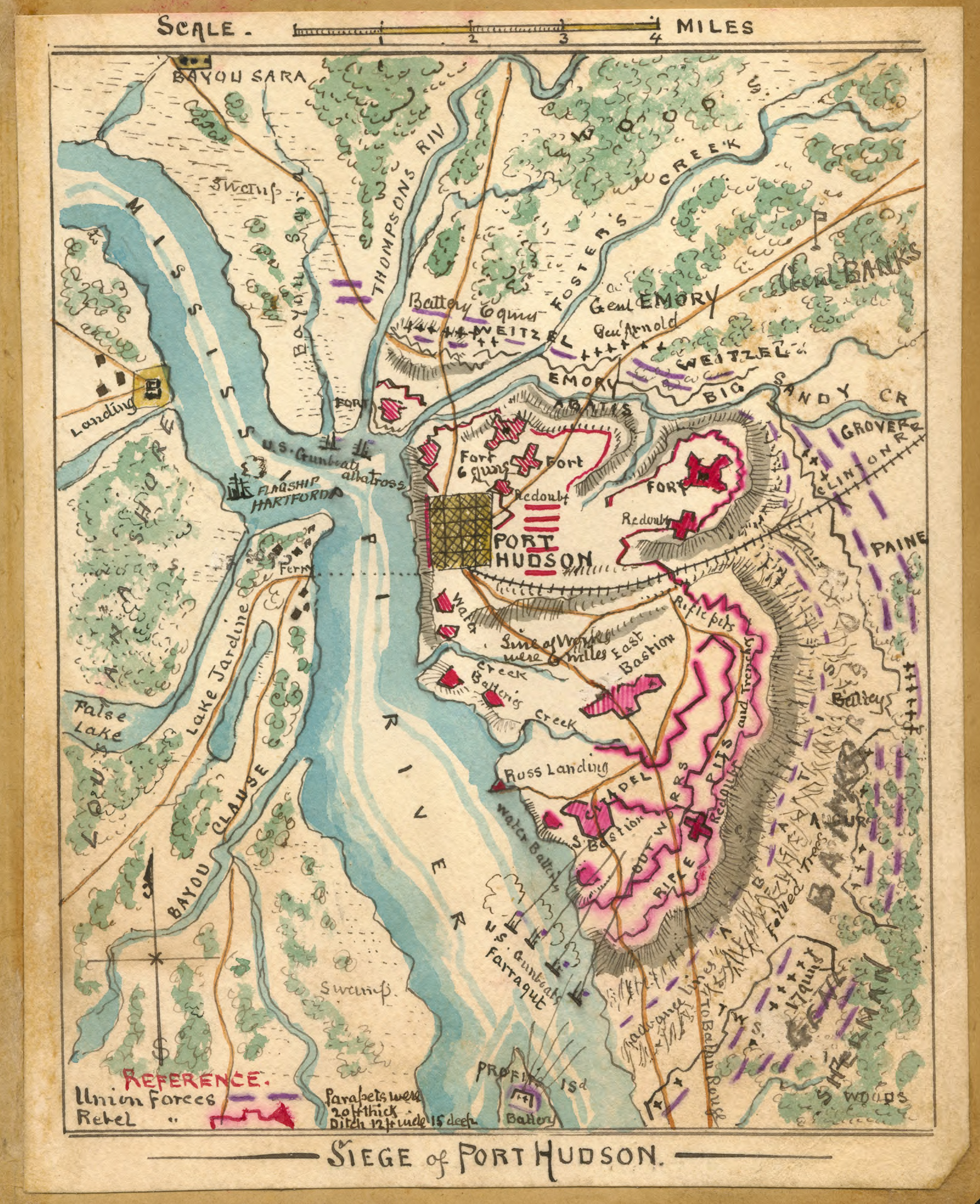
Siege of Port Hudson

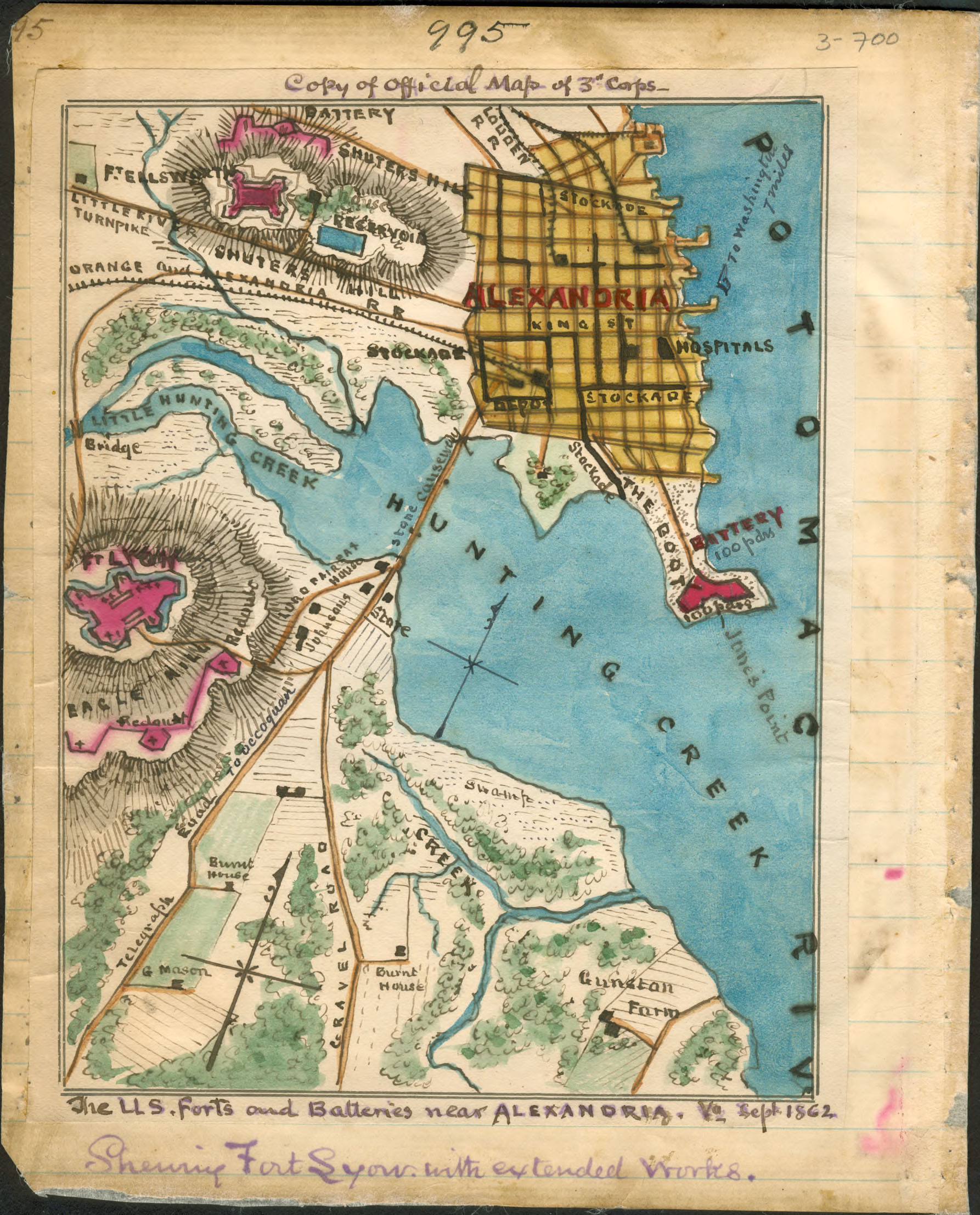
Forts near Alexandria, Virginia

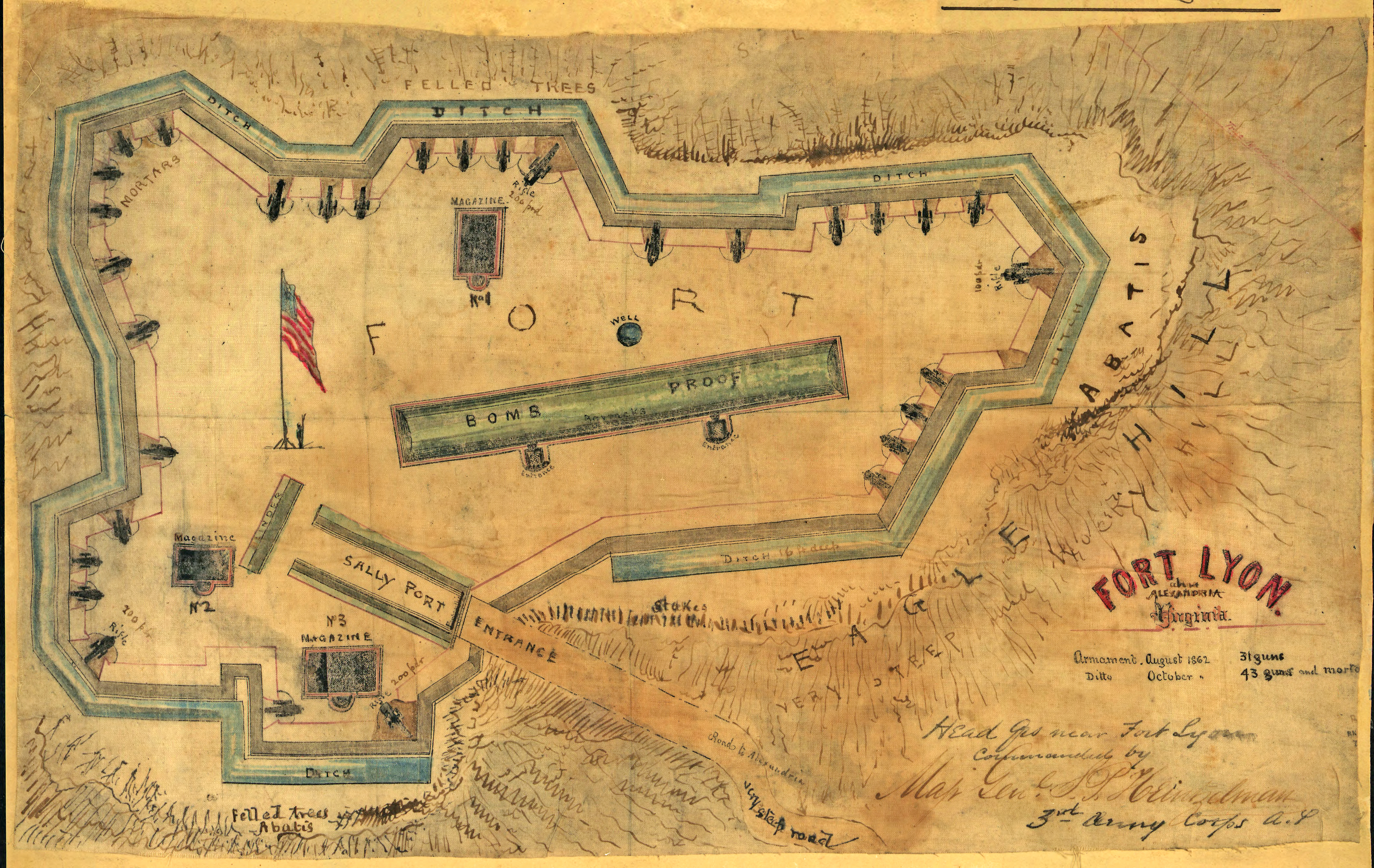
Fort Lyon Diagram

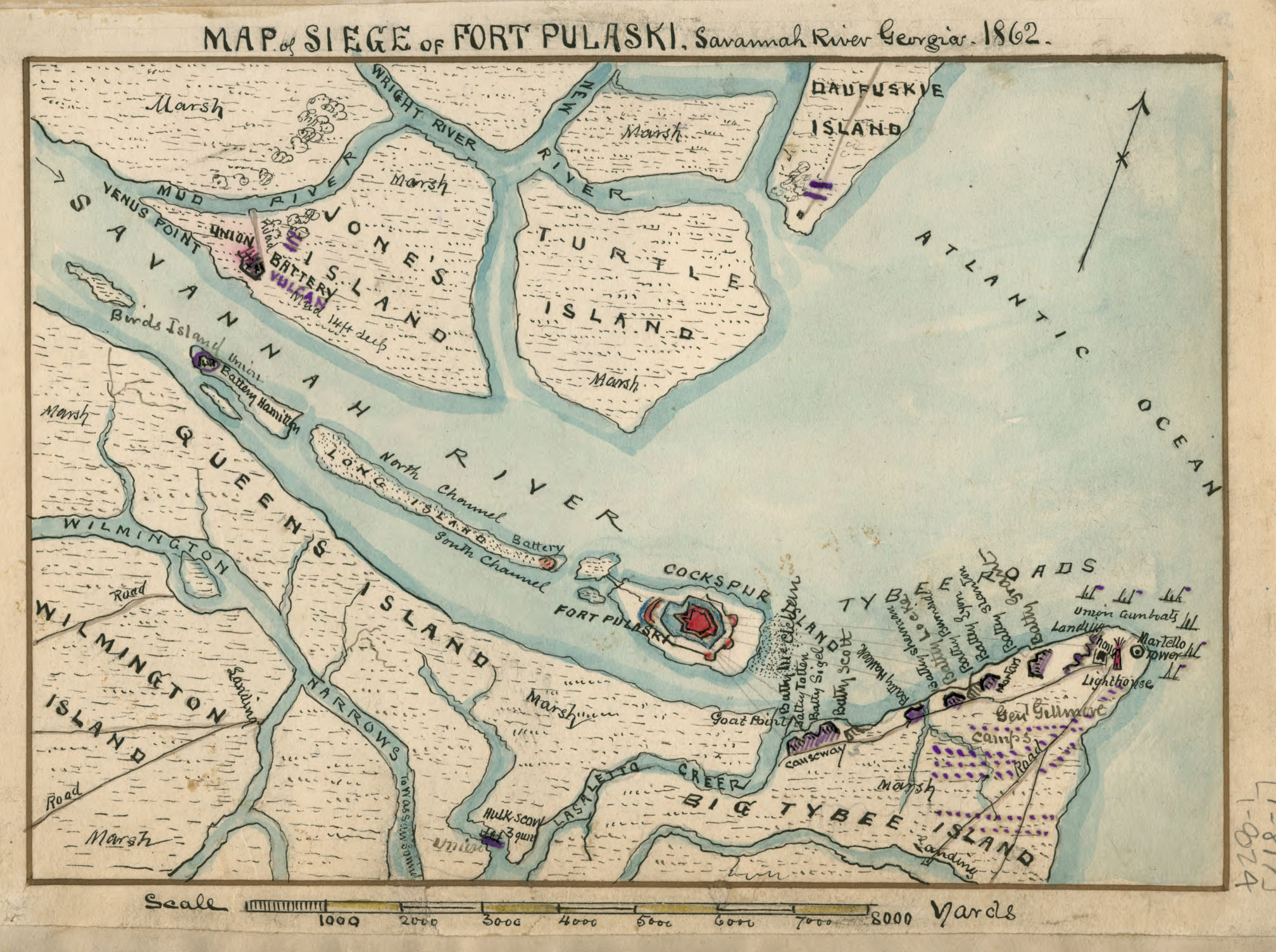
Siege of Fort Pulaski

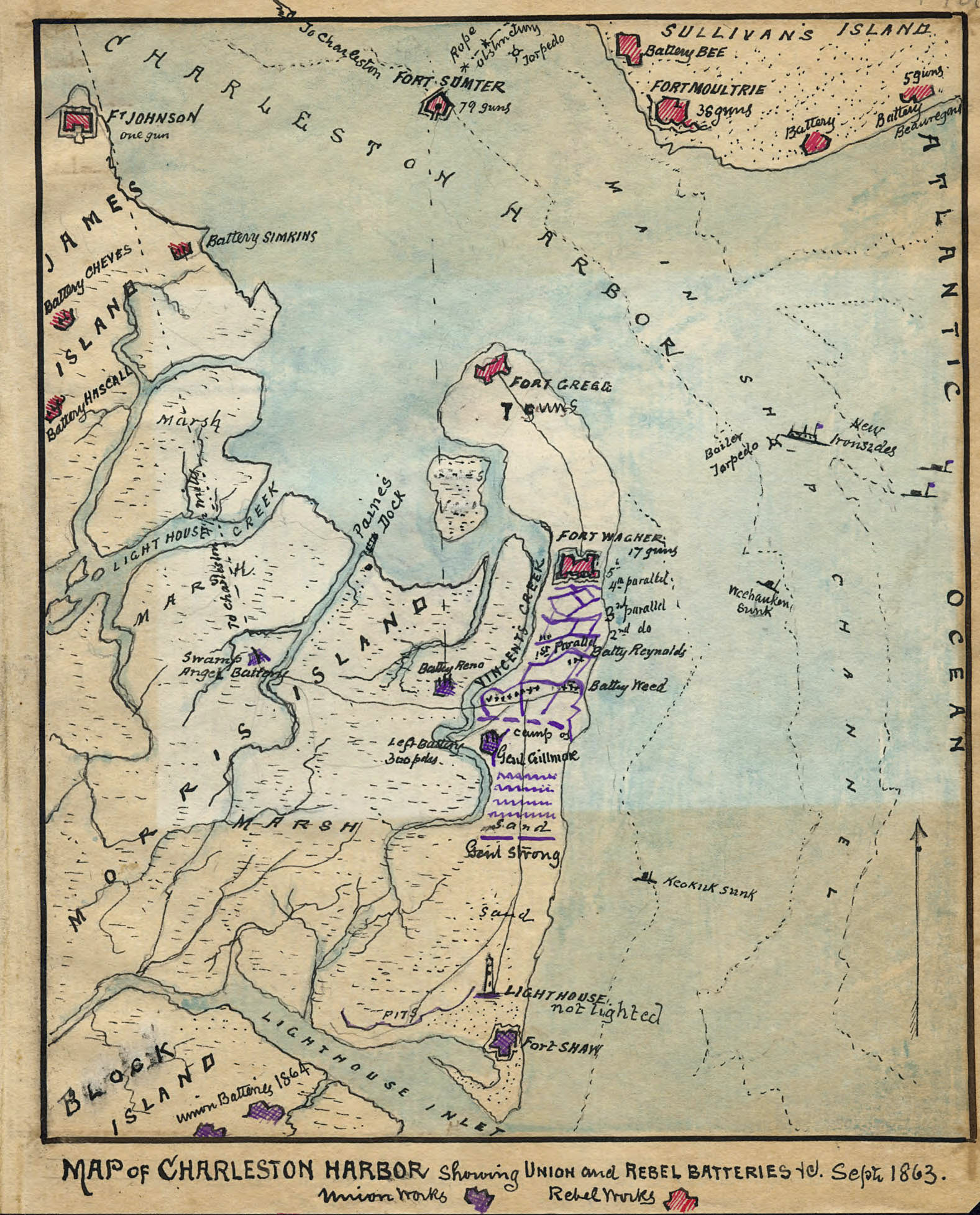
Siege of Charleston

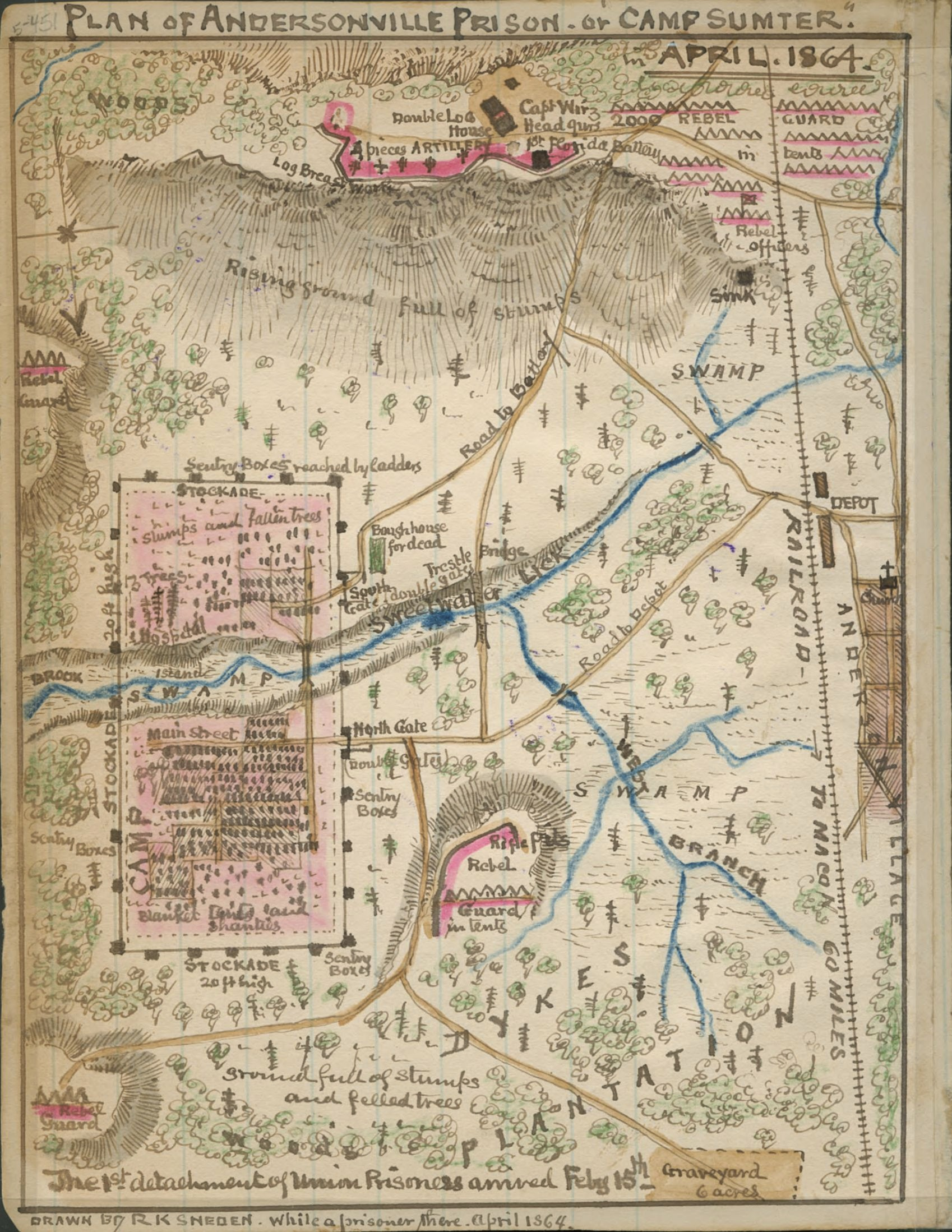
Plan of Andersonville Prison

== See also ==
- Edwin Forbes
- Alfred Waud
