= George M. Grueb =

U.S. Medal of Honor recipient

George Grueb
- Born: 1835; Württemberg
- Died: September 26, 1893 (aged 57–58)
- Burial place: Bath, New York
- Military career
- Allegiance: United States
- Branch: United States Army
- Service years: 1862 - 1865
- Rank: Corporal
- Units: Company E, 158th New York Volunteer Infantry Regiment
- Conflicts: Battle of Chaffin's Farm; American Civil War
- Awards: Medal of Honor

George Grueb (1835 - September 26, 1893) was an American soldier who fought in the American Civil War. Grueb received his country's highest award for bravery during combat, the Medal of Honor. Grueb's medal was won for his capturing a flag at the Battle of Chaffin's Farm in Virginia on September 29, 1864. He was honored with the award on April 6, 1865.

Grueb was born in Württemberg, Germany. He joined the Army from Brooklyn in August 1862, and mustered out with his regiment in June 1865. He was buried in Bath, New York.

== Medal of Honor citation ==
The President of the United States of America, in the name of Congress, takes pleasure in presenting the Medal of Honor to Private George M. Grueb, United States Army, for extraordinary heroism on 29 September 1864, while serving with Company E, 158th New York Infantry, in action at Chapin's Farm, Virginia, for gallantry in advancing to the ditch of the enemy's works.

== See also ==
- List of American Civil War Medal of Honor recipients: G–L
