= John Kiggins =

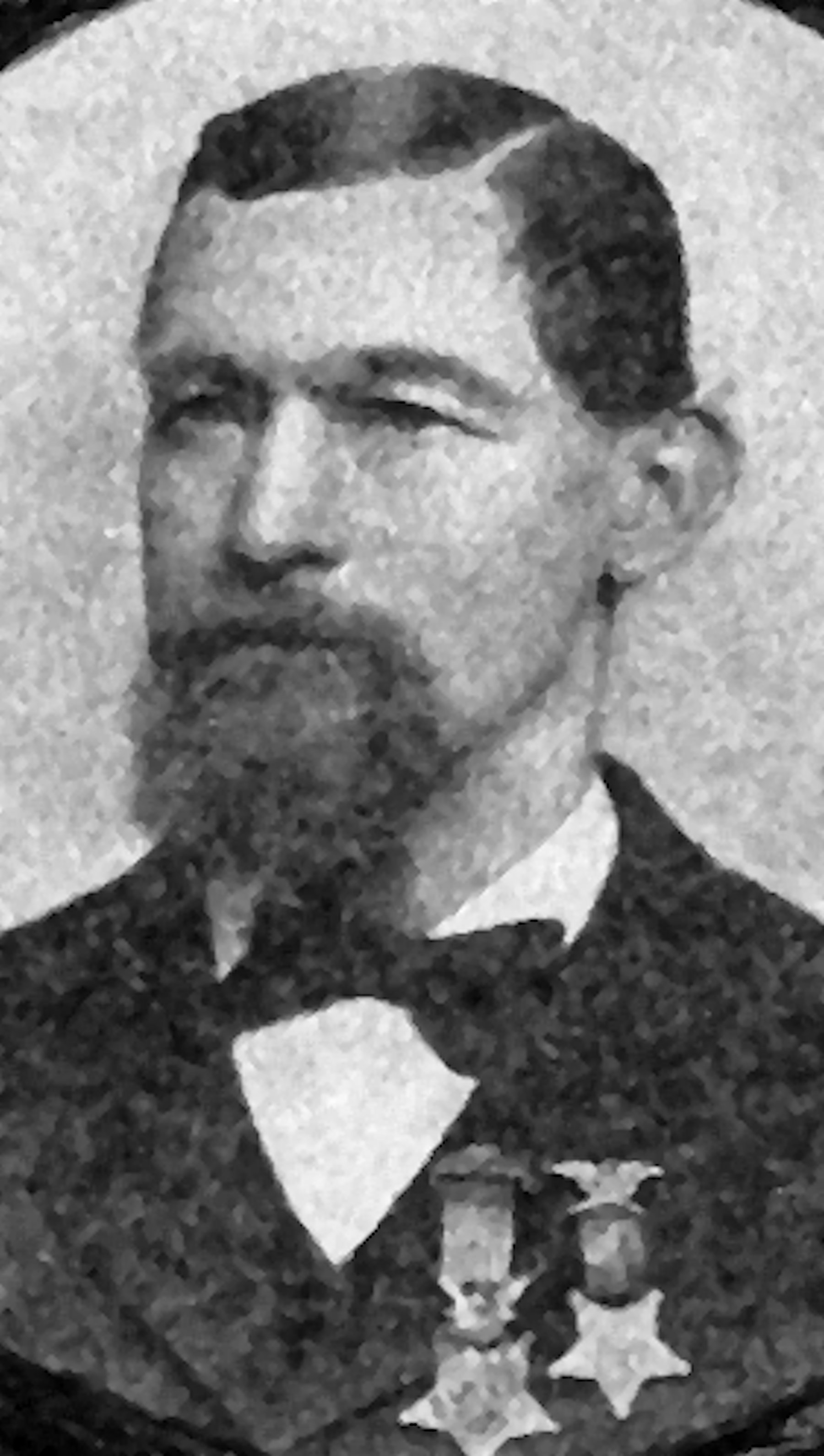
- Born: February 2, 1837; Syracuse, New York
- Died: September 29, 1914 (aged 77); Syracuse, New York
- Burial place: Bath, New York
- Military career
- Allegiance: United States of America; Union
- Branch: United States Army; Union Army
- Service years: 1862 - 1865
- Rank: Sergeant
- Unit: 149th New York Volunteer Infantry Regiment
- Conflicts: American Civil War • Battle of Lookout Mountain
- Awards: Medal of Honor

John Kiggins (February 2, 1837 – September 29, 1914) was a Union Army soldier in the American Civil War who received the U.S. military's highest decoration, the Medal of Honor, for his actions at the Battle of Lookout Mountain. He served as a sergeant and flag bearer with Company D of the 149th New York Volunteer Infantry Regiment.

== Biography ==
Kiggins enlisted in the Army from Syracuse, New York in September 1862. He was assigned to the 149th New York Infantry, and promoted to Sergeant on 1 November 1863.

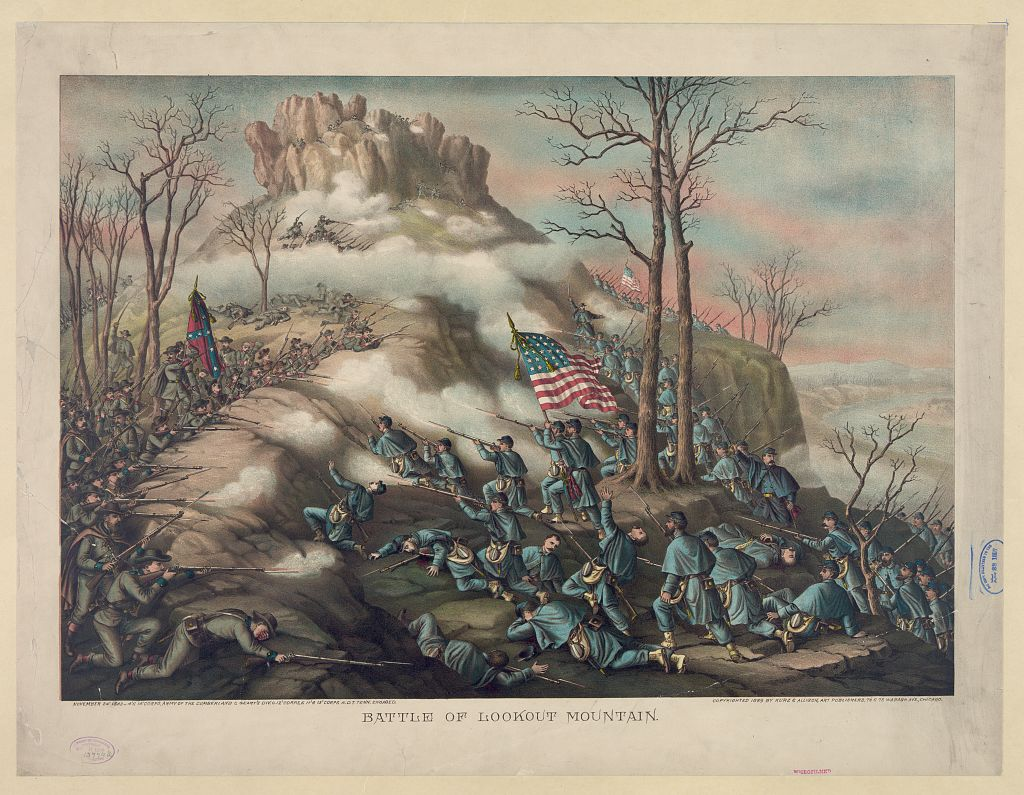
The Battle of Lookout Mountain, Kiggins is depicted at center holding flag

On November 24, 1863, the 149th New York was ordered to leave their camp on the Tennessee side of Lookout Mountain and advance on the Confederate stronghold located on the mountain. It was planned that the Northerners would defeat the enemy through sheer force. The men hastily made a bridge across Lookout Creek, and about half a mile away, started to fight the opposing forces.

Full scale fighting broke out, and the fog thickened. The men of the 149th had difficulty, because they were trapped between a Southern line and another Northern line and were being shelled from both sides. Kiggins stood on a stump, lifted a large American flag above his head and waved it around. The 149th was no longer being shot at by fellow Northerners. However, Kiggins was open to the fire of the Confederate troops. The battle swung in favor of the Northerners and the next day the Union troops had control of the mountain.

Civil War-era version of the Army Medal of Honor

Kiggins' clothing was filled with a total of nine bullet holes. The top of his head had been grazed by a bullet, and one bullet entered his thigh, but he survived. He was later mustered out with his regiment in June 1865. On January 12, 1892, he was awarded the Medal of Honor. He returned to Syracuse, New York, and worked as a night watchman for the Whitman and Barnes Company. He lived in Syracuse until his death on September 29, 1914.

== Medal of Honor citation ==
Rank and organization: Sergeant, Company D, 149th New York Infantry. Place and date: At Lookout Mountain, Tenn., November 24, 1863. Entered service at: Syracuse, N.Y. Birth: Syracuse, N.Y. Date of issue: January 12, 1892.

Citation:

Waved the colors to save the lives of the men who were being fired upon by their own batteries, and thereby drew upon himself a concentrated fire from the enemy.

== See also ==
- List of American Civil War Medal of Honor recipients: G–L
