= Naples Speedway =

Defunct auto racing venue in Naples, New York

- Location: Naples, New York
- Coordinates: 42.6228°N 77.3875°W
- Operator: Donald Cleveland
- Opened: 1949
- Closed: 1951
- Surface: Clay/sand mix
- Length: .536 km (0.333 mi)

Naples Speedway was a 1/3-mile (0.54 km) dirt oval racing facility in the Finger Lakes Region of New York State.

== Overview ==
The Naples Speedway was located at the end of East Avenue on the Naples New York Fairgrounds and is where the legendary Dutch Hoag launched his career. Starting in 1949 promoter Donald Cleveland paid each car $10 to race. Racing came to an end at the conclusion of the 1951 season.

== Sunday Blue Laws ==
Cleveland was arrested in June 1951 and again in September that year for violating New York's Sunday Blue Law. The law, which dated back to 1788, allowed specific sports and recreational activities on Sundays, but not stock car racing. Cleveland intended to protest the law by using his arrests as a legal test case, but was found not guilty by jury in both instances.

In a separate proceeding in New York State Supreme Court, Cleveland sought an injunction prohibiting police from enforcing the blue law. Although the court denied the injunction, Cleveland's efforts prompted the New York State legislature to lift the ban on Sunday stock car racing, as well as circuses, hunting and golf. Specifically, the law empowered local communities to authorize additional Sunday activities.

The Town of Naples considered such an ordinance in the spring of 1952, but refused to allow Cleveland to continue speedway operations.
