= Outlaw Speedway =

Motorsport venue in Dundee, New York

- Location: Dundee, New York
- Coordinates: 42.5176°N 76.9743°W
- Owner: Tyler Siri
- Opened: 1957
- Former names: Dundee Speedway, Dundee Raceway Park, Black Rock Speedway, Yates County Speedway
- Website: www.outlawspeedwayllc.com

Oval
- Surface: Clay
- Length: .645 km (0.401 mi)
- Turns: 4
- Banking: Semi-banked

Outlaw Speedway is a four-tenths mile semi-banked dirt oval raceway located in the Finger Lakes Region of New York State.

== Overview ==
Outlaw Speedway was originally the track used for events during the Dundee Fair. Trotters and pacers made their way around the oval in the early 1900s. In June 1957, over 1,000 fans attended the first stock car race at the Dundee Fairgrounds and witnessed Glenn Reiners of Penn Yan win the 20-lap feature race.

Leasing the track from the Dundee Fair Board, the non-profit Dundee Speedway Club operated it for over two decades. In 1983 Steve Wetmore was elected Club President, and Wetmore began a 13-year stint as promoter, during which former track champion Lin Hough purchased the facility.

After Hough retired from driving, he changed the name to Black Rock Speedway and his family continued promoting the dirt track action until selling the property to Dean Hoag, son of local racing legend Dutch Hoag. In 2016, Tyler Siri purchased the facility and renamed it Outlaw Speedway.

== Events ==
On Friday nights the facility hosts five racing classes: Modified, IMCA Modifieds, Street Stocks and Mini-stocks.

Each year when the nearby Watkins Glen International presents the NASCAR Cup Series, the track holds a special event where several NASCAR stars attend for a night of dirt track racing. The facility also regularly hosts sprint car touring events including Tony Stewart's All Star Circuit of Champions and Kyle Larson's High Limit Racing.
