= Dutch Hoag =

American racing driver (1926–2016)

- Born: Donald "Dutch" Hoag; November 2, 1926 Penn Yan, New York, U.S.
- Died: May 13, 2016 (aged 89)
- Retired: 1978
- Debut season: 1949

Modified racing career
- Car number: 7, 18, 96
- Championships: 18
- Wins: ≈400

Championship titles
- 1954 NASCAR NY Sportsman Champion; 1956,1960,1963,1967,1968 Langhorne National Open; 1967, 1968 New York State Fair Champion

NASCAR Cup Series career
- 4 races run over 3 years
- Best finish: 112th (1955)
- First race: 1952 (Monroe County Fairgrounds Rochester, New York)
- Last race: 1957 (Langhorne Speedway)
Wins	Top tens	Poles
0	1	0

Donald "Dutch" Hoag (November 2, 1926 – May 11, 2016) was an American racing driver who won the Langhorne National Open five times when it was the most prestigious event for Modified and Sportsman racers.

Hoag was the only driver to win that race both when Langhorne Speedway's surface was dirt (1956, 1960, 1963) and when it was asphalt (1967, 1968). He won an estimated 400 feature events, and won numerous track championships. Hoag was selected for the Northeast Dirt Modified Hall of Fame (one of thirteen charter members), the New York State Stock Car Association Hall of Fame, the Eastern Motorsports Press Association Hall of Fame, and the FOAR Score Hall of Fame.

== Early career ==
Hoag first raced in 1949. A new racetrack was opened in Naples, New York, and Hoag wanted to try racing. He bought a car from Bob Ratcliffe for $175 and towed it to the track on a chain. Later that year, Hoag won his first feature, at the Civic Stadium in Corning, New York.

== Langhorne victories ==
The first Langhorne National Open was held in 1951, and Hoag raced in it; he was one of the last cars to get through the large wreck which blocked the track and burned driver Wally Campbell, who was that year's NASCAR National Modified Champion. The National Open was the premiere event for weekly racers; track champions and other top racers from everywhere Modified and Sportsman cars were raced, gathered at a large, fast speedway where nobody had a home-track advantage. The race was renamed the "Race of Champions" when it was moved to Trenton in 1972 after Langhorne Speedway was closed.

Hoag first won the National Open in 1956, in a car he did not normally drive. This was Hal Kempeny's 1937 Ford coupe, which had been driven for its previous owner by Pete Corey. It had a Ford overhead-valve V-8 engine.

Hoag won the 1960 and 1963 Langhorne races with another team that wasn't his regular ride. These were with car owner Dave McCredy, as a teammate to Bill Wimble, two-time NASCAR national Sportsman champion.

In 1967, Hoag won the National Open driving for the Turner Brothers, his car owners in weekly racing at several tracks in New York State, along with traveling to special events elsewhere. Hoag and the Turners won one hundred features together.

Hoag's last Langhorne victory was in 1968, driving his car. His team was sponsored by the road-construction company of Gene DeWitt, who later was nationally noted as car owner for Richie Evans' team when Evans won nine NASCAR national Modified championships. Hoag won the 1968 National Open by a full lap.

== Track championships ==
Hoag won season championships in the Stock Car, Sportsman, and Modified divisions at several weekly speedways. He won three consecutive Stock division titles at Bath Speedway (Bath, New York) from 1952 through 1954. He won six championships at Monroe County Fairgrounds (Rochester, New York): 1952 through 1955, 1964, and 1967. He was the 1953 Sportsman champion at Hemlock Fairgrounds (Hemlock, New York). He won the Sportsman championship in 1953 and 1954 at Canandaigua Speedway (Canandaigua, New York), which propelled him to the 1954 NASCAR New York State Sportsman Championship. (Note: Although some sources claim Hoag was also named the NASCAR New York State Sportsman Champion in 1953, the gold watch awarded by NASCAR verifies that honor went instead to Steve Danish.^{†})

In the Modified division, Houg was champion at Shangri-La Speedway (Owego, New York) in 1965, 1969, and 1970. In 1965 through 1967, Hoag won three consecutive track championships at Spencer Speedway (Williamson, New York). He also won the unofficial New York State Modified Championship held at the NYS Fairgrounds (Syracuse, New York) in 1967 and 1968, which were the first two years cars with overhead valve engines were allowed to compete in this race.

== Races in major series ==
Hoag raced in four NASCAR Grand National (predecessor to Sprint Cup) races: one in 1952 (Monroe County Fairgrounds), two in 1955 (Palm Beach Speedway, Monroe County Fairgrounds), and one in 1957 (at Langhorne). His best finish was eighth, at Palm Beach in 1955.

In 1969, Hoag raced a 1965 Dodge, built for Grand National racing by Ray Fox, in the Permatex 300 for Late Model Sportsman cars (predecessor to the Nationwide Series) at Daytona International Speedway. Hoag finished second to Lee Roy Yarbrough.

== Death ==
Hoag died on May 11, 2016, at the age of 89.

== Motorsports career results ==
=== NASCAR ===
(key) (Bold – Pole position awarded by qualifying time. Italics – Pole position earned by points standings or practice time. * – Most laps led.

==== Grand National Series ====
NASCAR Grand National Series results
Year	Team	No.	Make	1	2	3	4	5	6	7	8	9	10	11	12	13	14	15	16	17	18	19	20	21	22	23	24	25	26	27	28	29	30	31	32	33	34	35	36	37	38	39	40	41	42	43	44	45	46	47	48	49	50	51	52	53	NGNC	Pts	Ref
1952	-	-	Ford	PBS	DAB	JSP	NWS	MAR	CLB	ATL	CCS	LAN	DAR	DSP	CAN	HAY	FMS	HBO	CLT	MSF	NIF	OSW	MON	MOR	PPS	MCF; 12	AWS	DAR	CCS	LAN	DSP	WIL	HBO	MAR	NWS	ATL	PBS																				114th	n/a	
1955	-	188	Oldsmobile	TCS	PBS; 8	JSP	DAB	OSP	CLB	HBO	NWS	MGY	LAN	CLT	HCY	ASF	TUS	MAR	RCH	NCF	FOR	LIN																																			112th	n/a	
1955	-	96	Chevy																				MCF; 17	FON	AIR	CLT	PIF	CLB	AWS	MOR	ALS	NYF	SAN	CLT	FOR	MAS	RSP	DAR	MGY	LAN	RSP	GPS	MAS	CLB	MAR	LVP	NWS	HBO									112th	n/a	
1957	-	86	Pontiac	WSS	CON	TIC	DAB	CON	WIL	HBO	AWS	NWS	LAN	CLT	PIF	GBF	POR	CCF	RCH	MAR	POR	EUR	LIN	LCS	ASP	NWP	CLB	CPS	PIF	JAC	RSP	CLT	MAS	POR	HCY	NOR	LCS	GLN	KPC	LIN	OBS	MYB	DAR	NYF	AWS	CSF	SCF	LAN; 45	CLB	CCF	CLT	MAR	NBR	CON	NWS	GBF	n/a	n/a	

== Champion racers influenced by Hoag ==
Lee Osborne, a former motorcycle racer, was Hoag's protégé for several years. He dated Hoag's daughter Donna from 1964 through 1966. In early 1965, he rebuilt an old Turner Brothers modified and began stock car racing. Osborne won 55 Modified features from 1965 through 1968. He then moved to Indiana to race Sprint cars, where he became a frequent winner and won the 1981 through 1983 championships of the All-Star Circuit of Champions. After retiring from driving, Osborne became one of the top Sprint car builders. In the 1990s, Donna Hoag lost her husband to cancer, reunited with Osborne, and married him.

Geoff Bodine's first taste of Modified driving came in Dutch Hoag's car at Shangri-La Speedway, when Hoag let him try it in a practice session. Bodine worked on Dutch Hoag's crew in 1968 and 1969. In the 1969 Race of Champions, Bodine handed the wrong tire over the wall during a pit stop. This was a time when Modifieds ran very different tire sizes among the four corners, so Hoag had to make an extra pit stop. Bodine went on to win the first Race of Champions after it was moved from Langhorne to Trenton Speedway in 1972.

In 1967, Hoag and fellow racer Gary Reddick were credited with saving the life of veteran racer Billy Blum in a fiery crash at Fulton Speedway.

== Descendants in racing ==
Dutch's son Dean Hoag got his start by driving Dutch's backup Modified, an older car, at Shangri-La Speedway. Dean drove Modifieds for a few years in the 1970s. Dean won the 1978 Perry Raceway (now Wyoming County International Speedway) Modified title with his No. 7. When Oswego Speedway created a Limited Supermodified division, Dean Hoag was a top contender driving the No. 41, with 16 feature victories to lead that division's all-time win list. Dean claimed the 1996 and 1997 titles before retiring in 1999. He went on to own Yates County (called Black Rock under Dean's leadership) Speedway in Dundee, New York.

Alex Hoag, Dutch Hoag's grandson, and Dean Hoag's son has won feature races in several divisions on dirt tracks, and was named Rookie of the Year in the DIRT organization's 358 Modified division in 2000. He has raced asphalt Modifieds as his grandfather did. He has raced in limited schedules on the NASCAR Whelen Modified Tour and the Busch East Series. He returned to racing after several seasons off from active driving in the Oswego Limited Supermodified division where he won one feature during the 2014 season with a #73.

== Notes ==
^{†}See: "Steve Danish: Watch awarded to the 1953 NY Sportsman Champion". The Catamount Stadium Website. Retrieved March 2, 2025; "Steve Danish". Times Union. Albany NY. August 14, 2003. p. B10. Retrieved February 28, 2025.
