= James Roberts (Medal of Honor) =

James Roberts (born 14 February 1837) was a seaman of the United States Navy who was awarded the Medal of Honor for gallantry during the American Civil War. He was born in England in 1837 and lived in Hartford, Connecticut. On 23 December 1864, while serving aboard the USS Agawam, he volunteered to help guide a fire ship towed by the USS Wilderness to the vicinity of the Confederate-held Fort Fisher in North Carolina. The explosion of the fire ship caused significant fires in Fort Fisher for at least one day. Roberts was awarded the Medal of Honor for this action on 31 December 1864.

Roberts' Medal of Honor citation reads:

The President of the United States of America, in the name of Congress, takes pleasure in presenting the Medal of Honor to Seaman James Roberts, United States Navy, for extraordinary heroism in action while serving on board the U.S.S. Agawam, as one of a volunteer crew of a powder boat which was exploded near Fort Fisher, North Carolina, 23 December 1864. The powder boat, towed in by the Wilderness to prevent detection by the enemy, cast off and slowly steamed to within 300 yards of the beach. After fuses and fires had been lit and a second anchor with short scope let go to assure the boat's tailing inshore, the crew again boarded the Wilderness and proceeded a distance of 12 miles from shore. Less than two hours later the explosion took place and the following day fires were observed still burning at the fort.

— E. M. Stanton, Secretary of War
