= Bath VA Medical Center =

- New York State Soldiers' and Sailors' Home–Bath Veterans Administration Center Historic District
- U.S. National Register of Historic Places
- U.S. Historic district
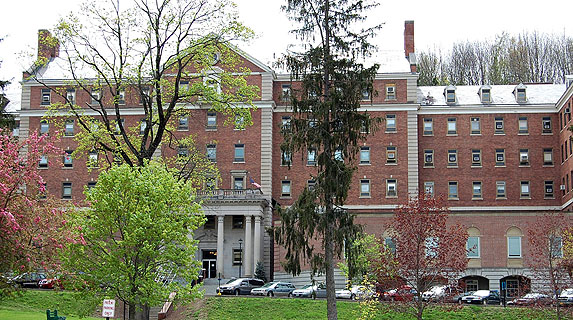
- Bath VA Medical Center.jpg

- Location within New York Location within the United States
- Interactive map showing the location of Bath VA Medical Center
- Location: 76 Veterans Ave., Bath, New York
- Coordinates: 42°20′37″N 77°20′46″W
- Built: 1878-1879
- MPS: United States Second Generation Veterans Hospitals Multiple Property Submission
- NRHP reference No.: 12001208
- Added to NRHP: January 23, 2013

Bath VA Medical Center is a U.S. Veterans Administration hospital located in Bath, New York. Affiliated with the University of Rochester School of Medicine, it provides secondary care and operates clinics in Elmira and Wellsville, New York; and Coudersport and Wellsboro, Pennsylvania. It was added to the National Register of Historic Places in 2013, and designated a national historic district.

== Soldiers' and Sailors' Home ==
The cornerstone of the original hospital was set in June 1877. A crowd of 20,000 cheered as the cornerstone was lowered into place by "Corporal" James Tanner, New York Department Commander of the Grand Army of the Republic. The property was transferred to the State in 1878, greatly expanded, and rededicated in 1879 as the New York State Soldiers' and Sailors' Home, Bath. It initially housed disabled New York veterans of the American Civil War, but, as the men aged, it became largely a geriatric facility. The number of residents peaked at 2,143 in 1907. By 1928, the number of residents had fallen to 192.

Veterans of the Spanish–American War and World War I also were treated at the facility. More than 32,000 veterans received treatment between 1879 and 1932.

Adjacent to the home is Bath National Cemetery, where many of its residents are buried.

The definitive history of the Soldiers Home was chronicled in 2005 by author Robert Yott in his book, The New York State Soldiers Home.

== Veterans Administration ==
The federal government took over operations in 1929, and renamed it the Bath Branch of the National Home for Disabled Volunteer Soldiers. The U.S. Veterans Administration was created in 1930, and the hospital and its grounds were deeded over to it in 1932.

The modern medical center is mostly an outpatient facility. It has a capacity of 440 beds, and provides services to more than 12,000 veterans.

== Gallery ==
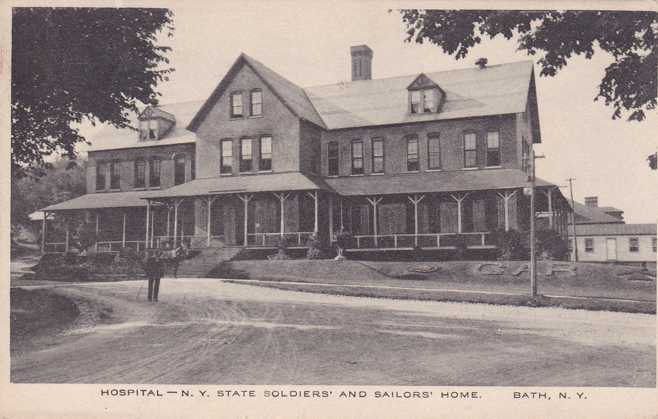
Original hospital

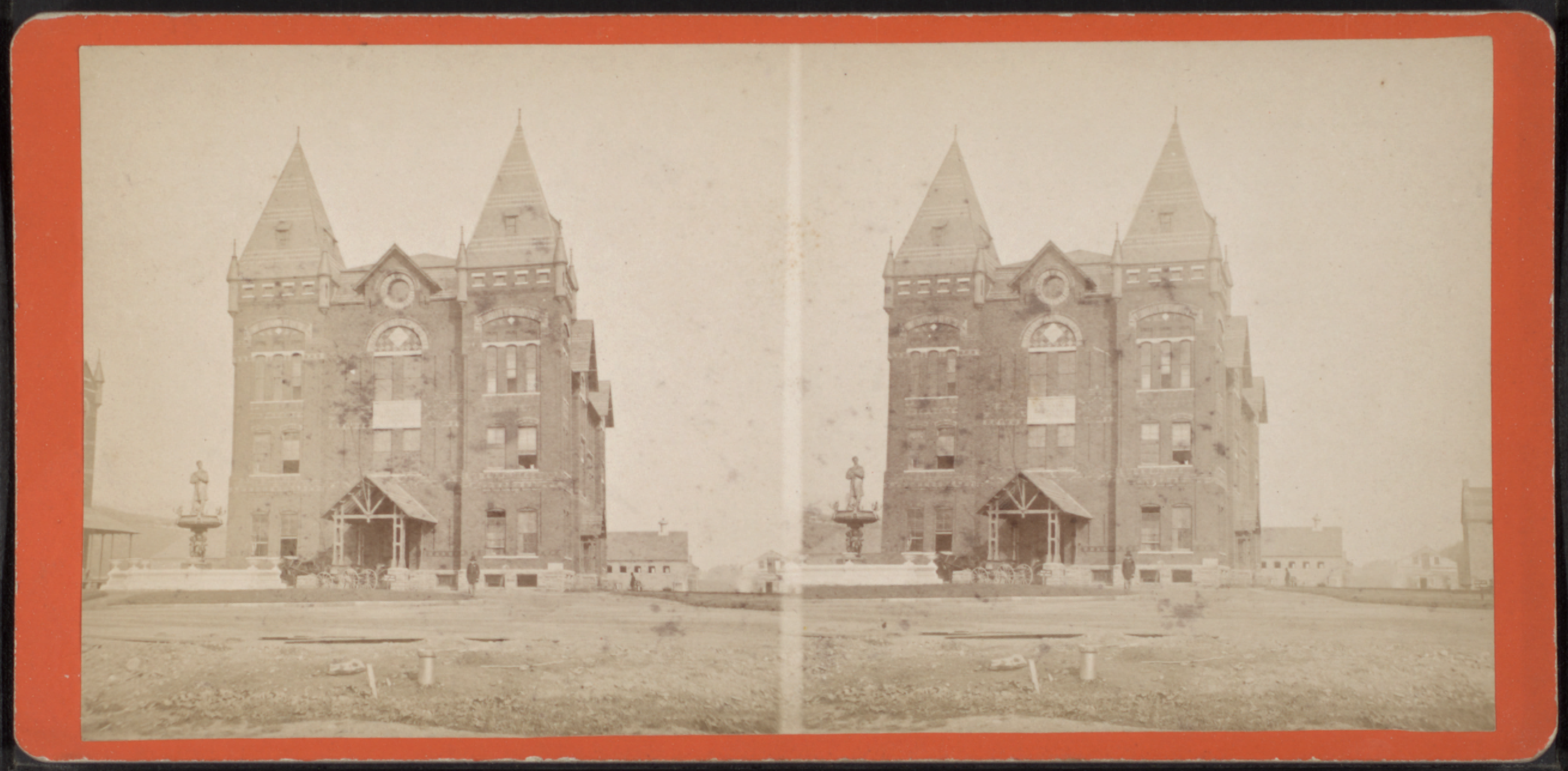
Barracks and Mess Hall.

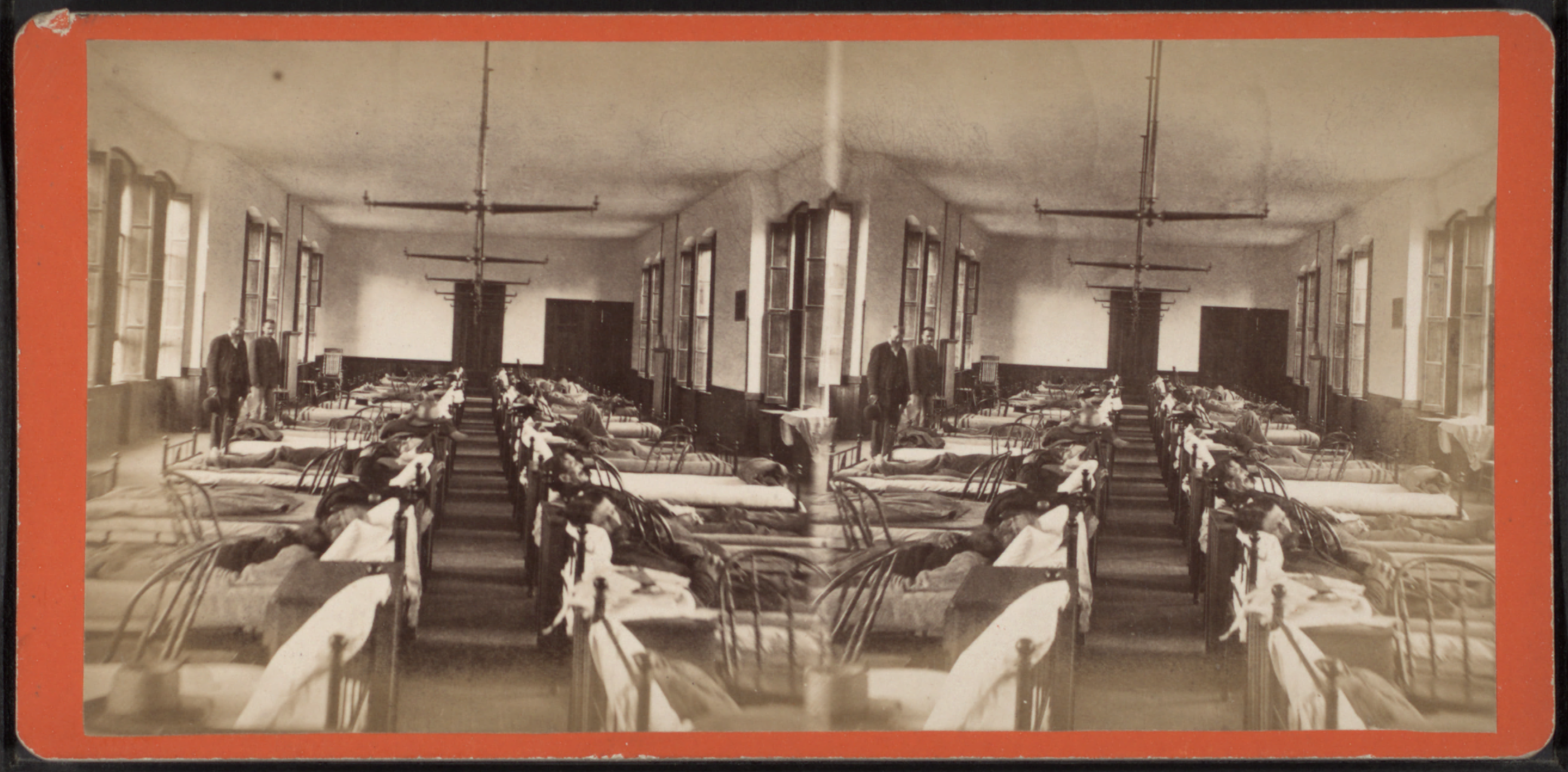
Interior of ward.

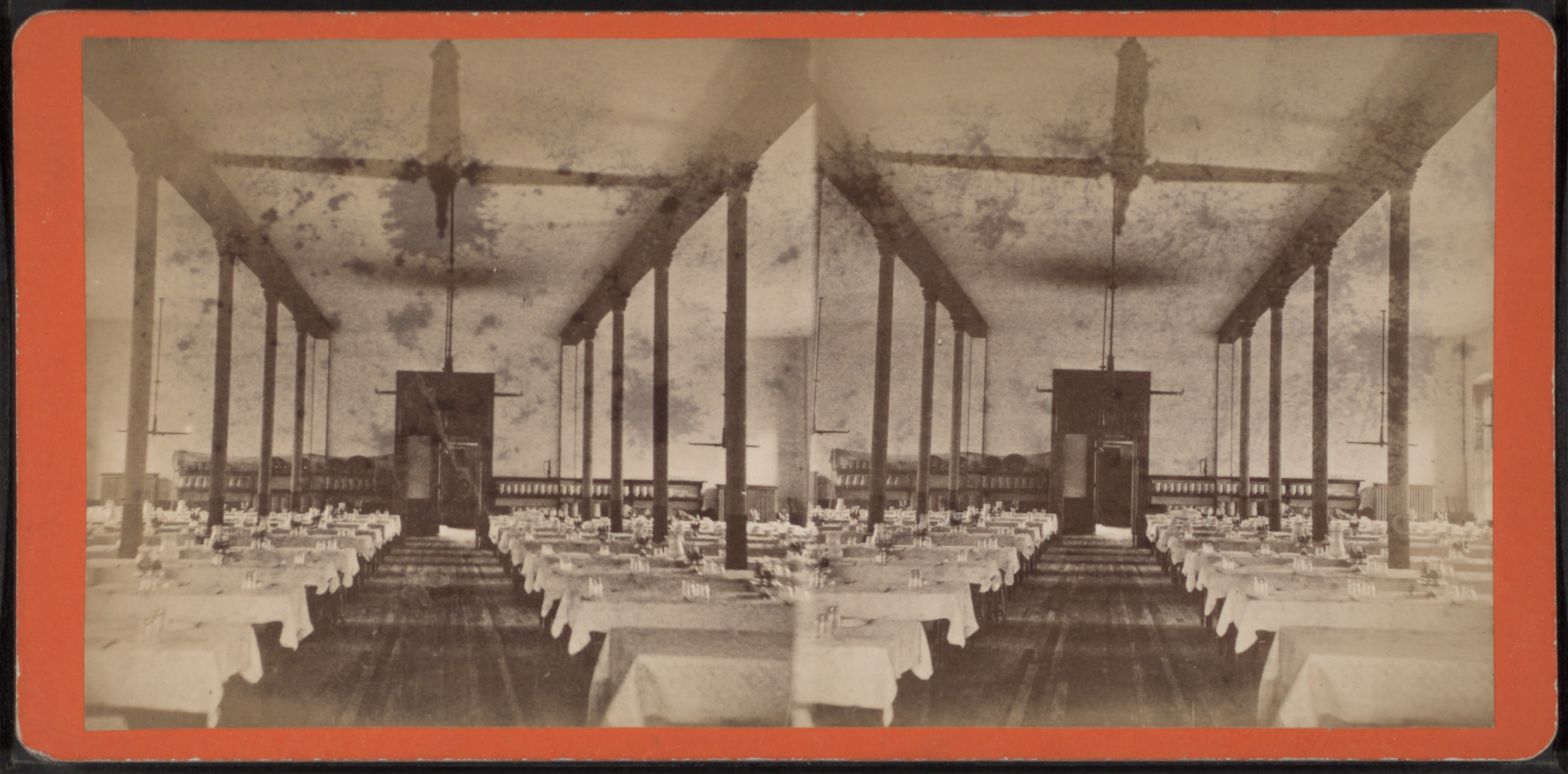
Dining room.

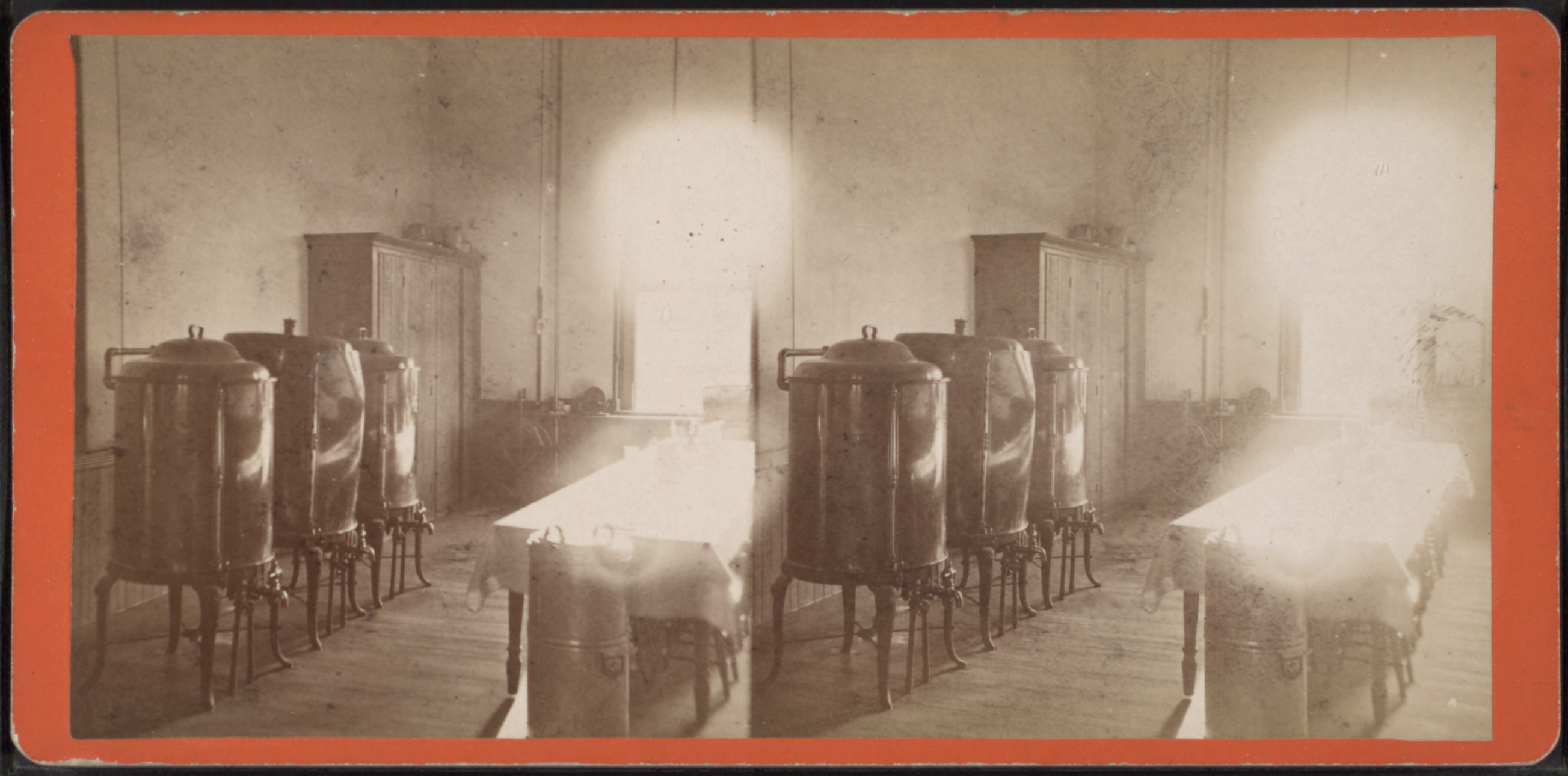
Kitchen.
