= Bath, New York =

Bath
- Town
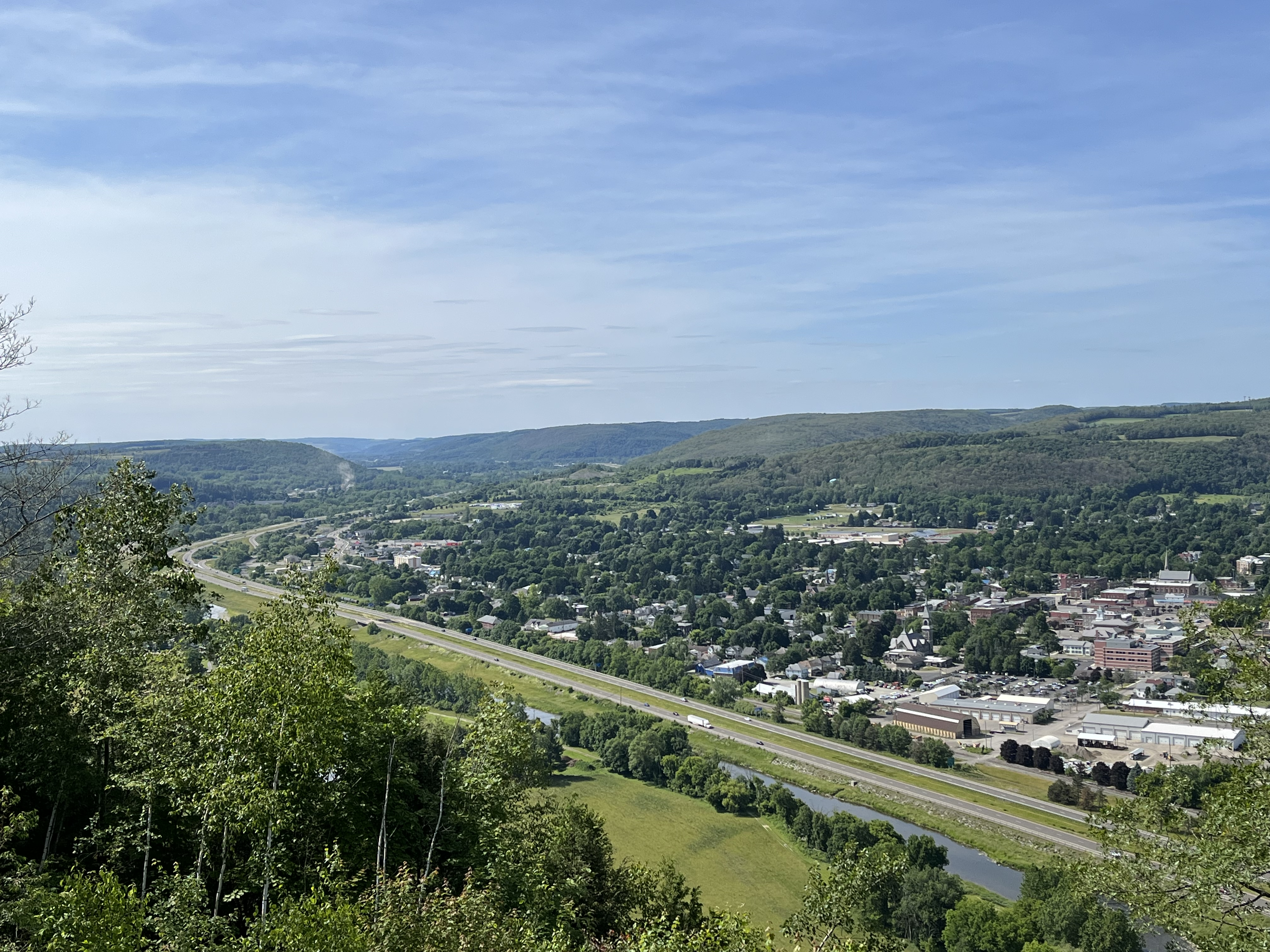
- A view of Bath

- Location of Bath in New York
- Coordinates: 42°20′13″N 77°19′05″W
- Country: United States
- State: New York
- County: Steuben

Area
  - Total: 95.88 sq mi (248.32 km^{2})
  - Land: 95.32 sq mi (246.89 km^{2})
  - Water: 0.56 sq mi (1.44 km^{2}) 0.3%

Population (2020)
  - Total: 11,426 ▼
  - Estimate (2021): 11,334
  - Density: 126.5/sq mi (48.84/km^{2})
- Time zone: UTC+5 (EST)
  - Summer (DST): UTC+4 (EDT)
- ZIP code: 14810
- Area code: 607
- FIPS code: 36-101-04770
- Website: townofbathny.gov

Bath is a town in Steuben County, New York, United States, with an area of 96.3 square miles (249 km^{2}) and a population of 11,426 in 2020. Its largest settlement is the Village of Bath, which has an area of 2.9 sq mi (7.5 km^{2}) and a population of 5,641 (in 2000). The Village is the county seat of Steuben County. The Town is located in the central part of the county, northwest of Horseheads. The town and village are either named after the city of Bath in England or after Lady Bath, daughter of a landowner.

== History ==
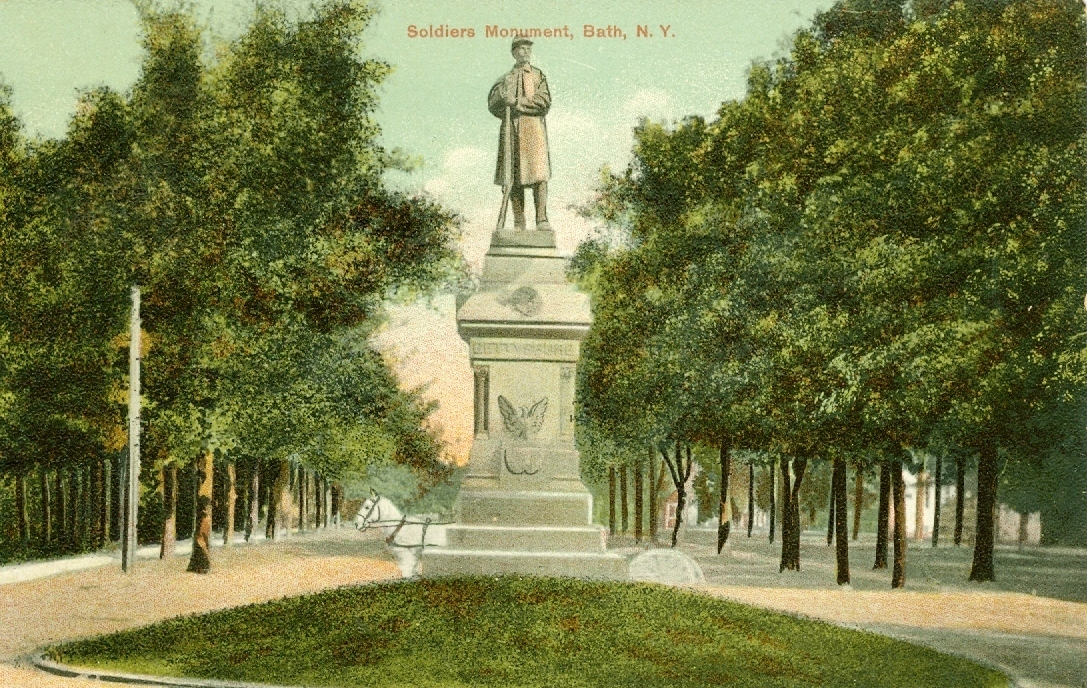
Bath Soldiers Monument

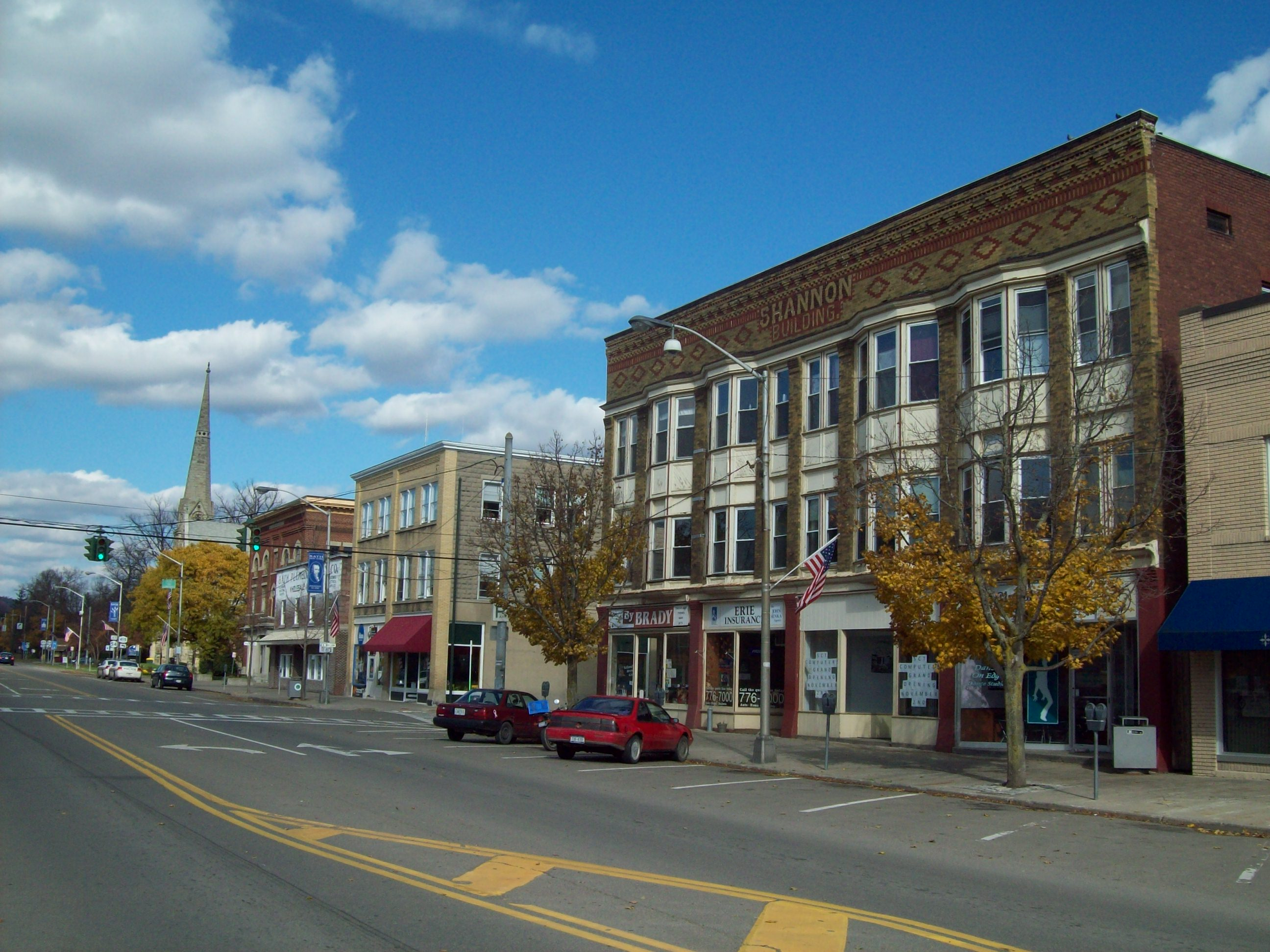
Liberty Street in the historic district of Bath

The town was founded in 1793 and was part of a land investment by the wealthy British politician William Pulteney, and named after Bath, Somerset, in England, where he owned extensive estates. It was created along with Steuben County in 1796 and became a mother town of the county, eventually yielding land to seven later towns. The Lackawanna Railroad opened its mainline through Bath, and opened a station, in 1882.

The first jailhouse was built in 1796 which was constructed out of logs at a location just west of Pulteney Square. It was eventually replaced by a more durable structure made of stone.

In 1828 a brick courthouse was constructed which was destroyed by fire. Using the same plan, It was immediately replaced using the same foundation.

== Geography ==
The United States Census Bureau lists the town's total area as 96.3 square miles (249.4 km^{2}), of which 96.0 square miles (248.6 km^{2}) is land and 0.3 square mile (0.8 km^{2})(0.32%) is water.

Interstate 86 (Southern Tier Expressway) passes through the town. New York State Route 54 and New York State Route 415 intersect in Bath village. New York State Route 53 has its southern terminus at NY-415 in the community of Kanona. New York State Route 226 passes through Savona.

The Cohocton River flows through the town past the hamlet of Kanona and the villages of Bath and Savona.

=== Communities and locations in the town of Bath ===
- Bath village
- Buck Settlement – A hamlet in the southwestern part of the town.
- Coss Corners – A location south of Unionville on County Road 10.
- Dudley Settlement – A hamlet south of Bath village, lying between Unionville and East Union.
- East Union – A hamlet south of Bath village.
- Haverling Heights – A community bordering the northern side of Bath village.
- Kanona – A hamlet northwest of Bath village by Interstate 86. The village is centered on the intersection of NY-53, NY-415 and County Road 14.
- Knight Settlement – A location in the northwestern part of the town on County Road 15.
- Savona village
- Sonora – A hamlet by the eastern town line.
- Thomas Corners – A location in the southwestern part of the town.
- Unionville – A hamlet south of Bath village on County Road 10.

=== Climate ===
This climatic region is typified by large seasonal temperature differences, with warm to hot (and often humid) summers and cold (sometimes severely cold) winters. According to the Köppen Climate Classification system, Bath has a humid continental climate, abbreviated "Dfb" on climate maps.

== Demographics ==
Historical population
Census	Pop.	Note	%±
1820	2,578		—
1830	3,387		31.4%
1840	4,915		45.1%
1850	6,185		25.8%
1860	5,129		−17.1%
1870	6,236		21.6%
1880	7,396		18.6%
1890	7,881		6.6%
1900	8,437		7.1%
1910	8,554		1.4%
1920	7,317		−14.5%
1930	7,843		7.2%
1940	9,354		19.3%
1950	10,926		16.8%
1960	11,978		9.6%
1970	11,953		−0.2%
1980	12,268		2.6%
1990	12,724		3.7%
2000	12,097		−4.9%
2010	12,379		2.3%
2020	11,426		−7.7%
2021 (est.)	11,334	▼	−0.8%
U.S. Decennial Census

As of the census of 2000, there were 12,097 people, 4,905 households, and 3,050 families residing in the town. The population density was 126.0 inhabitants per square mile (48.6/km^{2}). There were 5,402 housing units at an average density of 56.3 per square mile (21.7/km^{2}). The racial makeup of the town was 96.04% White, 1.79% Black or African American, 0.30% Native American, 0.71% Asian, 0.03% Pacific Islander, 0.10% from other races, and 1.03% from two or more races. Hispanic or Latino of any race were 0.70% of the population.

There were 4,905 households, out of which 28.5% had children under the age of 18 living with them, 45.5% were married couples living together, 11.9% had a female householder with no husband present, and 37.8% were non-families. 31.6% of all households were made up of individuals, and 14.8% had someone living alone who was 65 years of age or older. The average household size was 2.34 and the average family size was 2.90.

In the town, the population was spread out, with 23.4% under the age of 18, 7.7% from 18 to 24, 25.9% from 25 to 44, 24.5% from 45 to 64, and 18.5% who were 65 years of age or older. The median age was 41 years. For every 100 females, there were 101.7 males. For every 100 females age 18 and over, there were 98.5 males.

The median income for a household in the town was $32,508, and the median income for a family was $39,625. Males had a median income of $30,456 versus $25,160 for females. The per capita income for the town was $16,939. About 10.5% of families and 14.5% of the population were below the poverty line, including 19.5% of those under age 18 and 7.5% of those age 65 or over.

== Arts and culture ==
- The Bath VA Medical Center - Established in 1877 and dedicated in 1879 as New York State Soldiers' and Sailors' Home.
- Bath National Cemetery - Originally part of the New York State Soldiers and Sailors Home, it became part of the National Cemetery system in 1930.
- Steuben County Fairgrounds - First organized in 1819, the county fair now occupies the grounds each August. The venue also hosts the annual Steuben County Dairy Festival in June to celebrate the strong dairy-based economy of the area.

== Notable people ==
- George Brinski (alternatively spelled Beniski, Benninsky, and Brinske), Civil War substitute for future president Grover Cleveland
- Joseph James DeAngelo, serial killer
- Richard William Davis, child killer
- Jermain Wesley Loguen, Black minister and educator, lived in Bath from 1843 to 1846
- Dutch Hoag, champion auto racing driver

== See also ==
- Bath Speedway

== Sources ==
- Clayton, W. Woodford (1879). History of Steuben county, New York, with illustrations and biographical sketches of some of its prominent men and pioneers. Philadelphia: Lewis, Peck & Co.
